= South Sudbury station =

South Sudbury
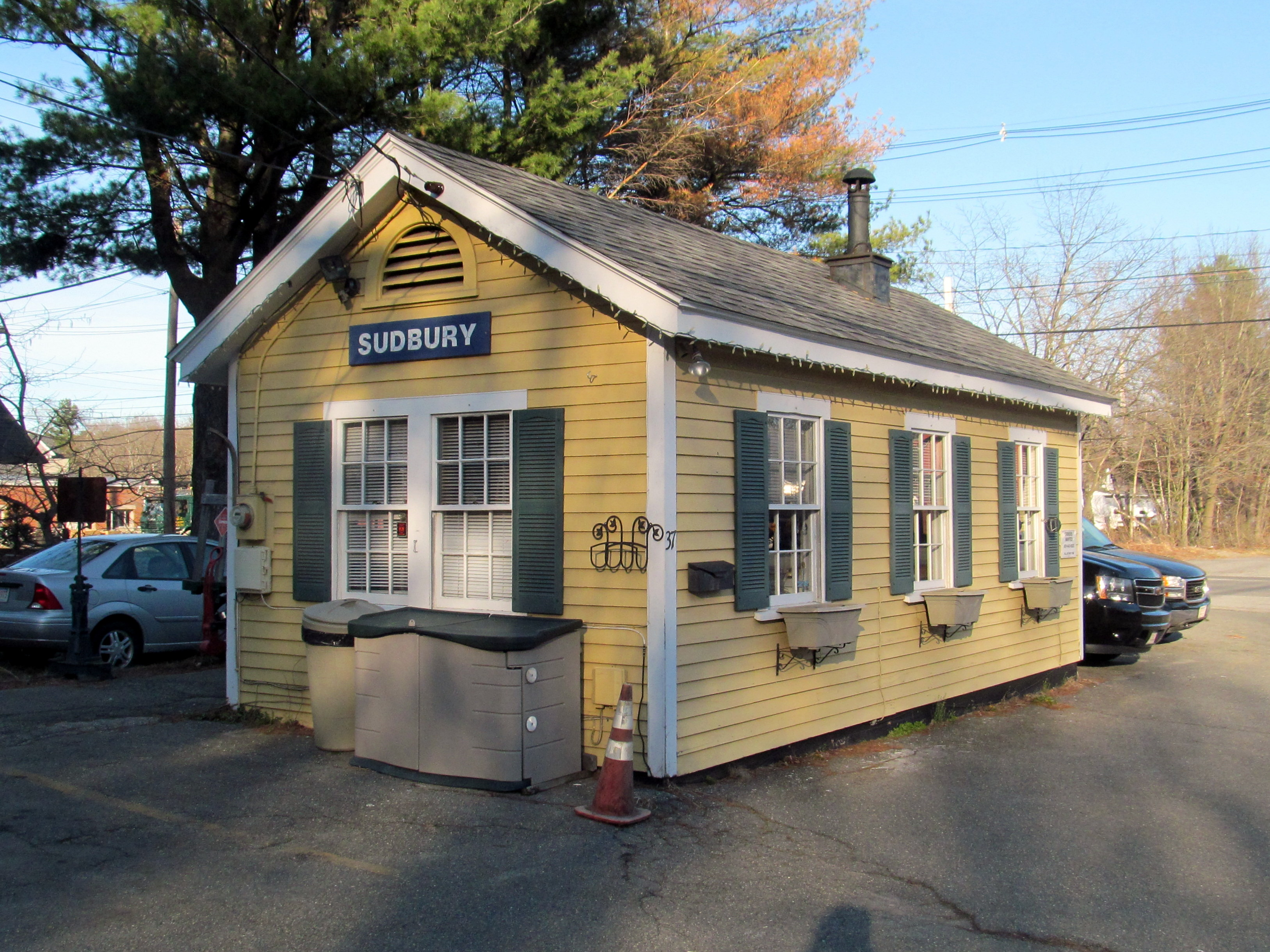
- South Sudbury station building in April 2016

General information
- Location: 37 Union Avenue; Sudbury, Massachusetts
- Coordinates: 42.363246°N 71.422307°W
- Owner: MBTA, transfer of ownership to Sudbury proposed
- Lines: Massachusetts Central Railroad; Central Massachusetts Branch (Boston & Maine); Central Mass Branch (MBTA); Framingham and Lowell Railroad
- Platforms: 1
- Tracks: 1

History
- Opened: 1871 (Framingham & Lowell)
- Closed: November 26, 1971
- Rebuilt: c. 1887-91, c. 1952

Former services
Preceding station	MBTA	Following station
Terminus	Central Mass Branch (closed 1971)	East Sudbury toward North Station
Preceding station	Boston and Maine Railroad	Following station
Wayside Inn toward Northampton	Central Mass Branch	East Sudbury toward Boston
Preceding station	New York, New Haven and Hartford Railroad	Following station
Nobscot toward Framingham	Framingham–Lowell	Sudbury toward Lowell
Location

South Sudbury station is a former commuter rail station in Sudbury, Massachusetts. It was located at the junction of the Massachusetts Central Railroad, succeeded by the Central Massachusetts Railroad, and the Framingham and Lowell Railroad, slightly north of Boston Post Road (U.S. Route 20) in South Sudbury. The Boston and Maine Railroad station was incorporated into the MBTA Commuter Rail through subsidies in 1965. The station was closed in November 1971 when the branch's last remaining round trip was discontinued. The 1952-built station building housed a private business until its closure in 2019.

== History ==
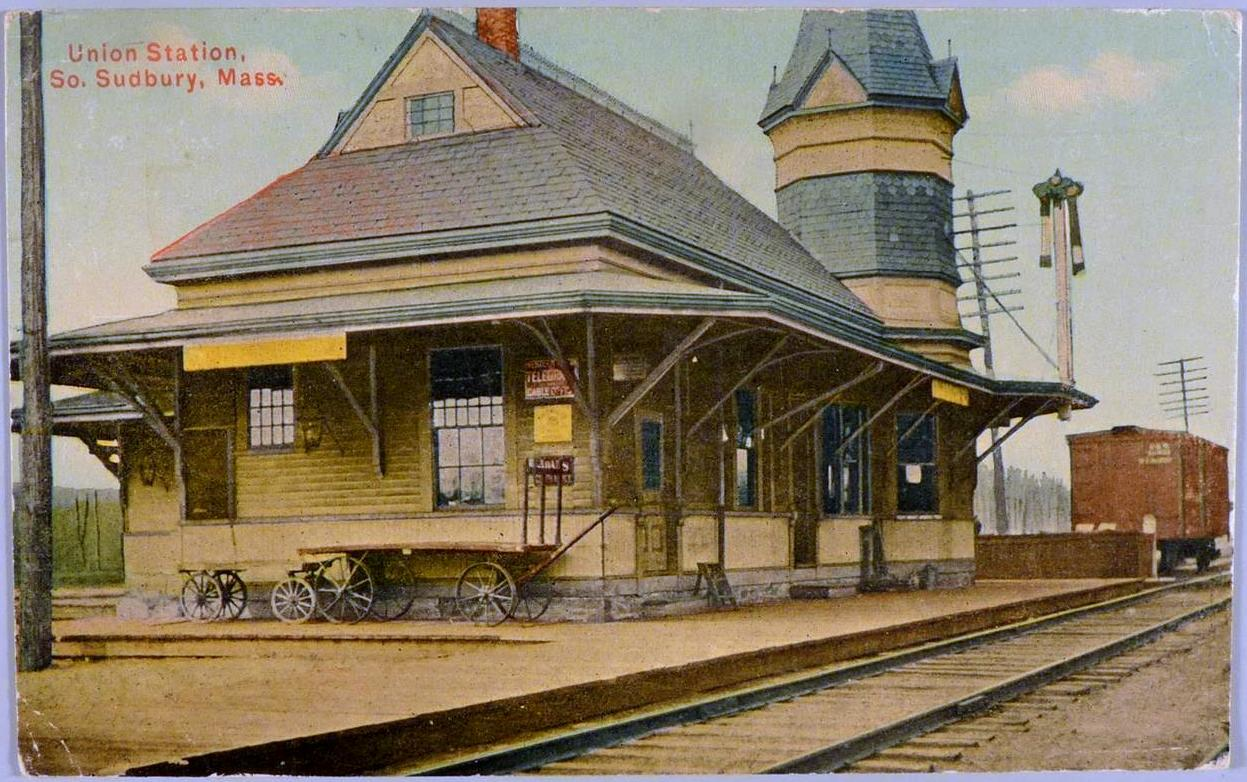
South Sudbury Union Station in 1911

The Framingham and Lowell Railroad (F&L) opened between its namesake cities on October 1, 1871. Its South Sudbury station and freight house were located on the east side of the tracks, on the north side of Boston Post Road.

The Massachusetts Central Railroad (MC) opened from Boston to Hudson, Massachusetts in October 1881. After going out of business in 1883, it was reopened by the Central Massachusetts Railroad (CM) contracted by the Boston and Lowell Railroad (B&L) in 1885, which was, in turn, acquired by the Boston and Maine Railroad (B&M) in 1887.

The Old Colony Railroad, which had acquired the F&L in 1879, constructed a union station at the southeast corner of the junction of the two lines around 1887-91. This Victorian-style station included a three-story tower. The Old Colony Railroad was leased by the New York, New Haven and Hartford Railroad (often referred to as just the "New Haven Railroad") in 1893, making South Sudbury one of a small number of stations which served both of New England's two largest railroads.

Passenger service ended on the F&L in 1933 (although freight service between South Sudbury and West Concord lasted until 1982, and between South Sudbury and Framingham Centre into the 1990s). Service on the CM past Clinton ended in 1932 and on the branch to Marlborough in 1939; by 1950, there were just four daily round trips. With such drastically-reduced traffic levels, it was no longer economical for the B&M to maintain the large Union Station. A small wooden station was built around 1952; after failed attempts to move and preserve it, Union Station was demolished, with portions of the interior auctioned off to collectors.

The Massachusetts Bay Transportation Authority (MBTA) was formed in August 1964 to subsidize suburban commuter rail service. On January 18, 1965, services were cut back to the boundaries of the MBTA funding district. Although the MBTA initially intended to discontinue the single remaining trips on the Central Massachusetts Branch and the Lexington Branch, they were kept at the last minute. However, the remaining CM trip was cut from Hudson to South Sudbury.

On November 26, 1971, the remaining South Sudbury round trip was discontinued due to poor track conditions and dwindling ridership. The circa-1952 station building is still extant and was used as a private business until 2019. During this period it became known as "Crumble Station" due to the bakery in operation at the location; eventually AAA Limousines was the final tenant. Part of the platform and a station sign reading "Sudbury" remain at the building.

In August 2023, the Massachusetts Department of Conservation and Recreation offered the building to the Town of Sudbury at no cost. In May 2024, the Town voted to acquire it.

=== Rail trails ===
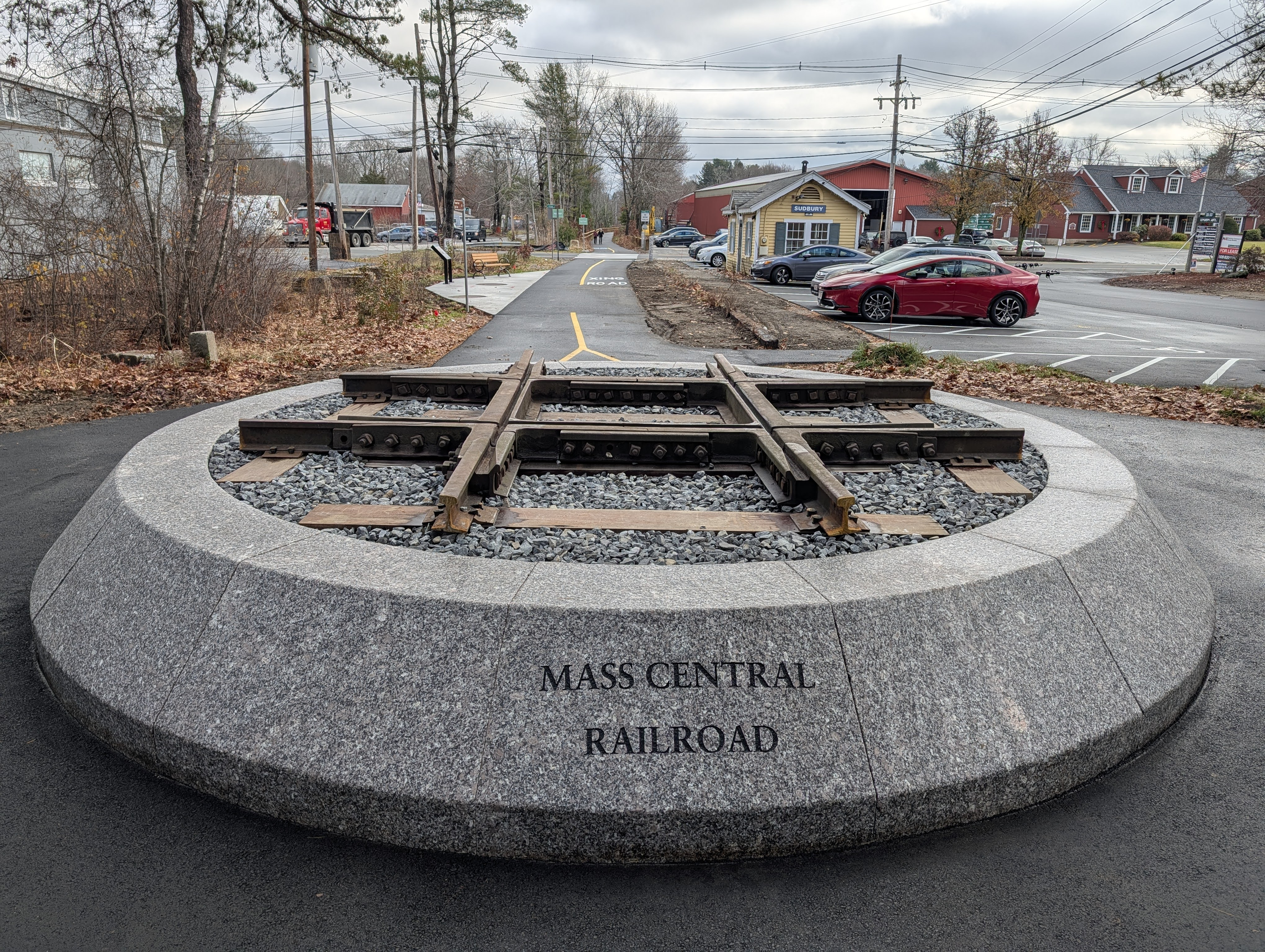
Diamond crossing at Mass Central Rail Trail—Wayside and Bruce Freeman Rail Trail roundabout at South Sudbury in November 2025

In 2022, a buried transmission line project between Sudbury and Hudson began construction under the former Massachusetts Central Railroad ROW. This project subsidized the cost of building the Mass Central Rail Trail—Wayside, which was completed in 2025. As part of this project, DCR installed a granite marker to commemorate the archaeological site. In 2023, a paved section of the Bruce Freeman Rail Trail began construction over the former Framingham and Lowell Railroad ROW north of the diamond crossing, and the project was opened to the public in 2025. The Bruce Freeman Rail Trail section south of the diamond crossing is in design and funded for construction in 2029.

=== Section house ===
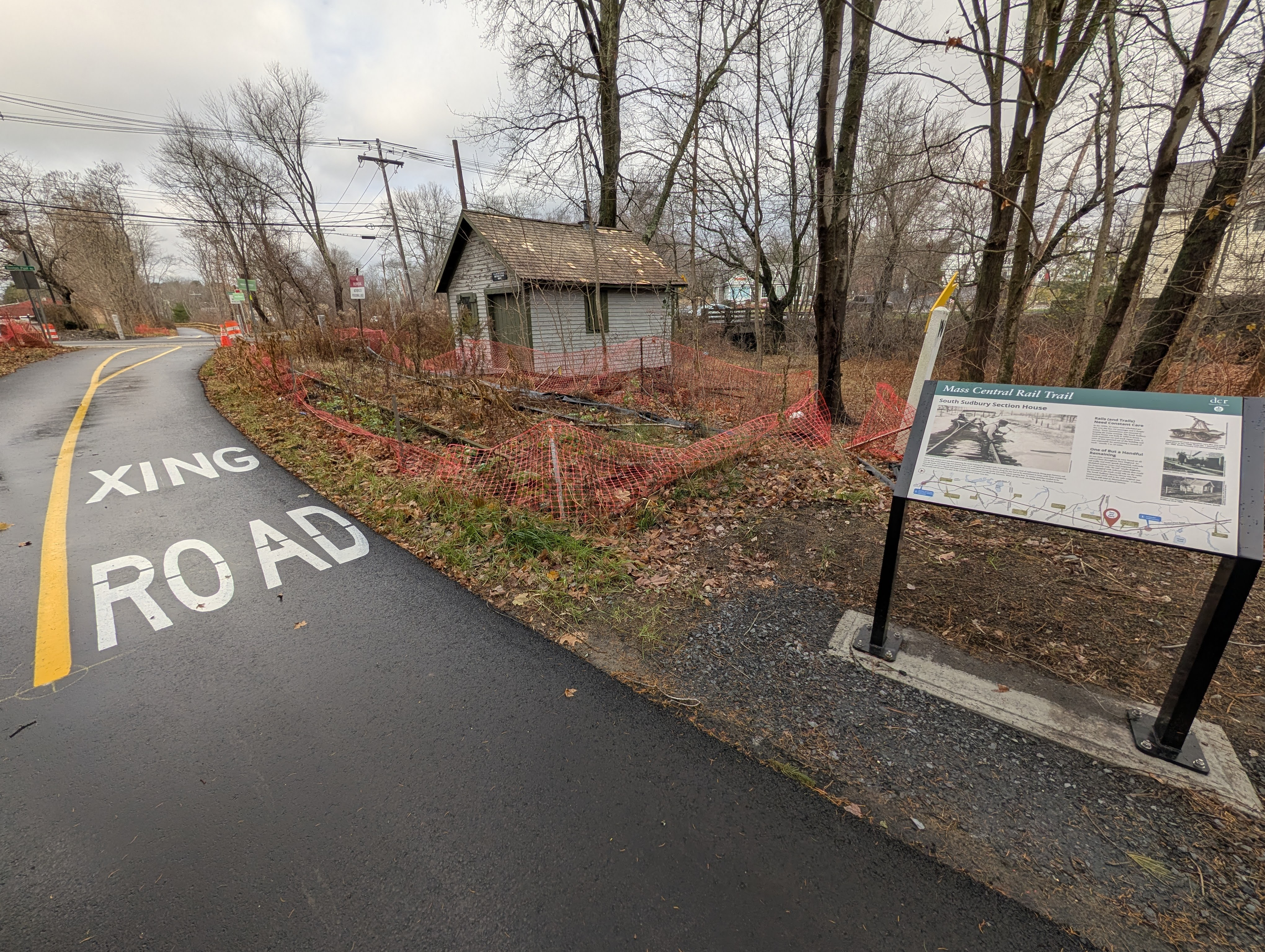
Sudbury section house in November 2025

In May 2024, by Town vote Sudbury authorized the purchase of the South Sudbury station, together with the Central Massachusetts Railroad Section House, also known as the Section Tool House, from the MBTA. In May 2025, by Town vote Sudbury authorized a purchase price of $100 for the two buildings. The Section House is approximately 1300 feet east of the station, past Route 20. It was built in 1890 to house a track inspection car and track repair tools for a crew of men that would maintain track for typically 5–10 miles. This building is one of the few remaining section houses and the only original one known to still exist in Massachusetts. The Section House was last used in 1958 when the B&M abolished section crews. It has been under a long-term lease to the Town of Sudbury who has maintained the structure. In 2025, DCR placed an interpretive sign describing the history of the Section Tool House for the benefit of the users of the Mass Central Rail Trail—Wayside.
