= Linden Street Bridge =

- U.S. National Register of Historic Places
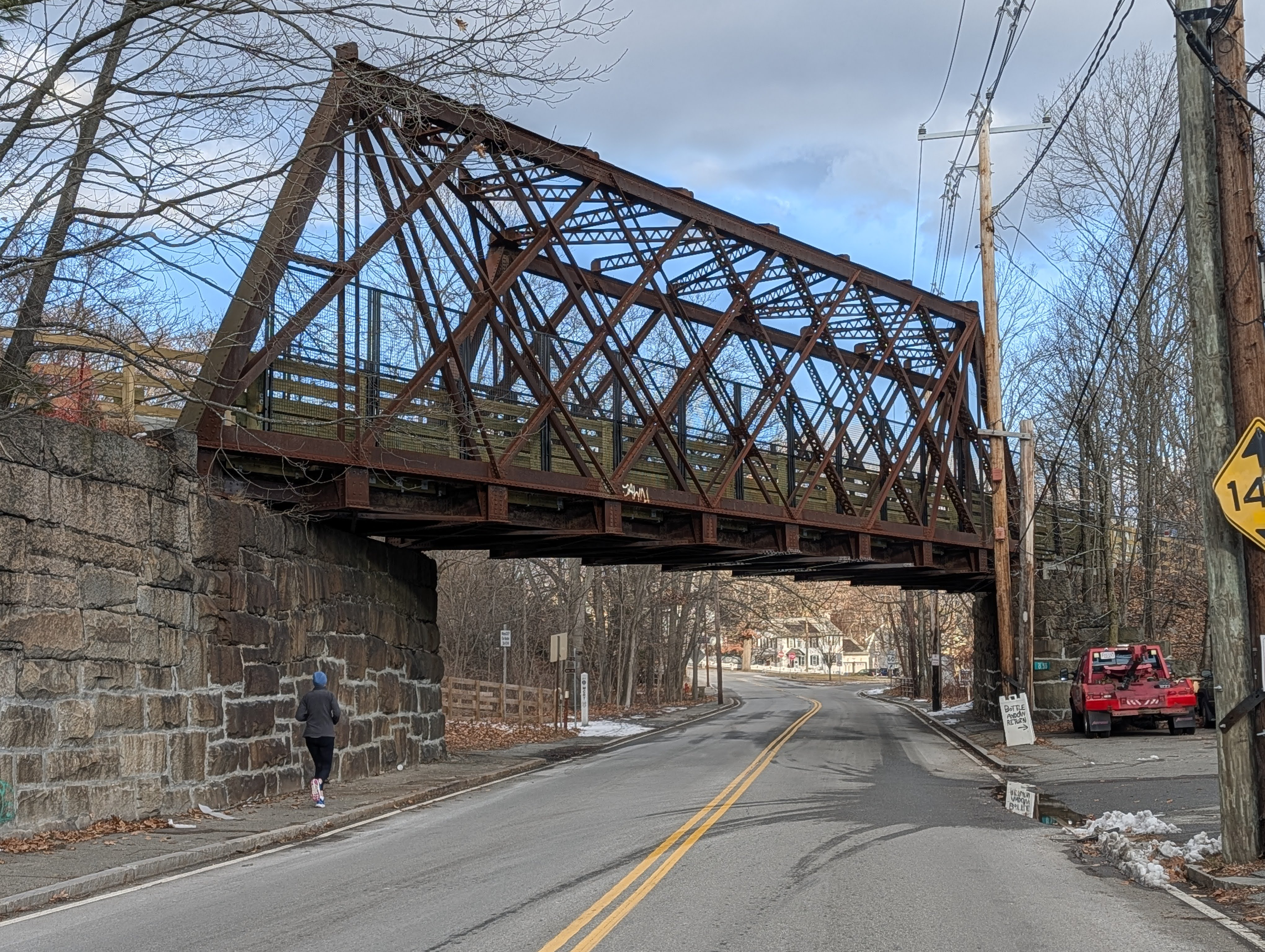
- The Linden Street Bridge in 2025

- Location within Massachusetts Location within the United States
- Location: Linden Street, Waltham, Massachusetts
- Coordinates: 42°22′49″N 71°13′13″W
- Built: 1894
- Architect: Pennsylvania Steel Company
- Restored by: Department of Conservation and Recreation
- Website: https://www.mass.gov/info-details/mass-central-rail-trail-wayside
- MPS: Waltham MRA
- NRHP reference No.: 89001515
- Added to NRHP: September 28, 1989

The Linden Street Bridge is a Mass Central Rail Trail—Wayside (MCRT—Wayside) bridge over Linden Street (Massachusetts Route 60) in Waltham, Massachusetts. It was built in 1894 for the former Central Massachusetts Railroad by the Pennsylvania Steel Company. It was restored by the Department of Conservation and Recreation (DCR) for bicycle and pedestrian use in 2025. It is a riveted lattice through truss bridge, one of only three such bridges left in the state.

== History ==
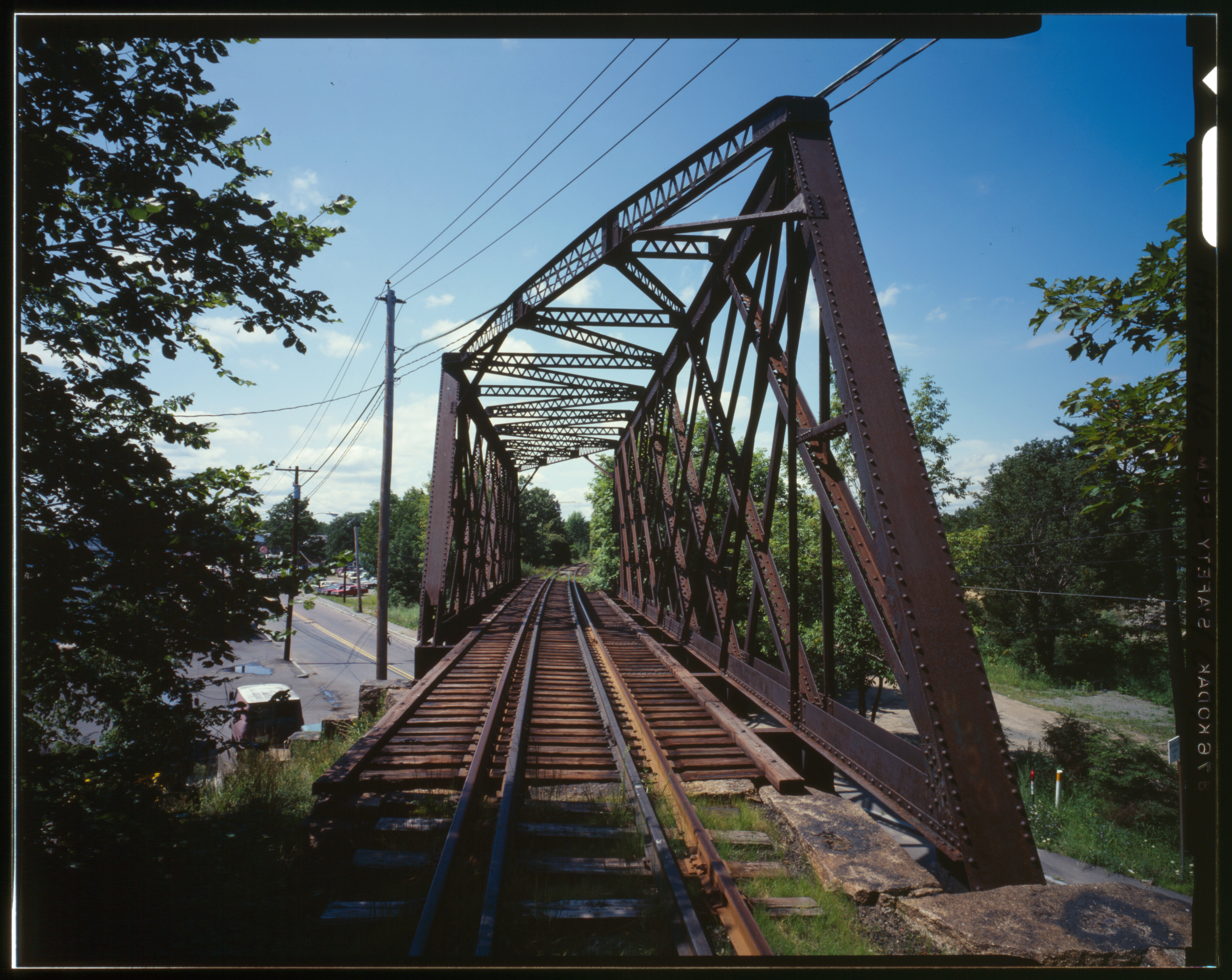
The Linden Street Bridge in 1982

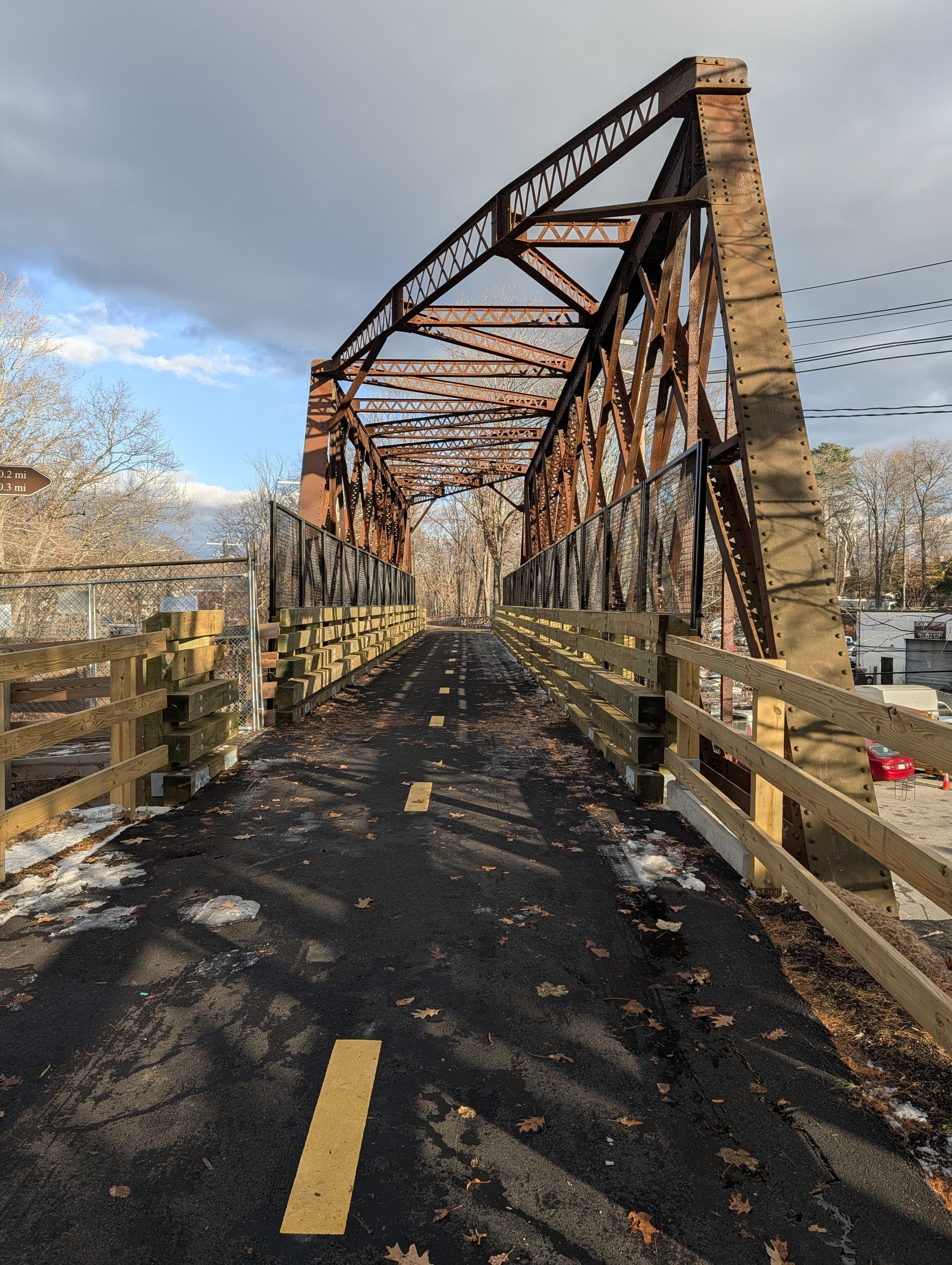
The Linden Street Bridge in 2025

The granite bridge abutments for the Linden Street Bridge were constructed in 1881 by the Massachusetts Central Railroad. The original bridge was probably a double-intersection Warren truss. The replacement, riveted lattice through truss bridge was built in 1894 by the Pennsylvania Steel Company of Steelton, PA for the Central Massachusetts Railroad. The bridge is 98 feet 3 inches (29.95 m) long and 17 feet (5.2 m) wide, with an inside truss height of 21 feet 11.5 inches (6.693 m), and rests on granite abutments. The riveted lattice through truss design of this bridge, along with the Stony Brook Bridge over the Fitchburg MBTA tracks, was based on the Norwottuck Rail Trail Bridge over the Connecticut River, by the same railroad. Today, these three are the only riveted lattice through truss bridges extant in Massachusetts.

By 1971, all passenger service ended on the Central Mass Branch. On December 27, 1976 the Boston and Maine Railroad sold the Central Mass Branch as well as several other lines to the Massachusetts Bay Transportation Authority (MBTA), but retained freight obligations. This section of the Central Mass Branch, and the bridge, have been out of service since 1994 when service to the last customer, a lumber dealer located on Emerson Road, ended.

The bridge was listed on the National Register of Historic Places in 1989. In 2002, the Wayside Rail Trail Committee held the Golden Spike 2002 event adjacent to the bridge, where statewide advocates unified on the Mass Central Rail Trail name for the greater project between Boston and Northampton. In 2010, the Department of Conservation and Recreation (DCR) signed a 99-year lease with the MBTA to build the Mass Central Rail Trail—Wayside from Waltham to Berlin.

In 2022 and 2023, Waltham received two reimbursement based, $500,000 MassTrails grants intended to fund restoration of the bridge for the MCRT—Wayside, matching $9,300,000 spent on a 2.75 mile trail section built in Waltham. However, Waltham did not proceed with the bridge restoration. In September 2024, DCR announced it would fund restoration of the bridge. Construction began in December 2024 and completed in December 2025.

== See also ==
- List of bridges documented by the Historic American Engineering Record in Massachusetts
- List of bridges on the National Register of Historic Places in Massachusetts
- National Register of Historic Places listings in Waltham, Massachusetts
