= Wayside Inn station =

Wayside Inn
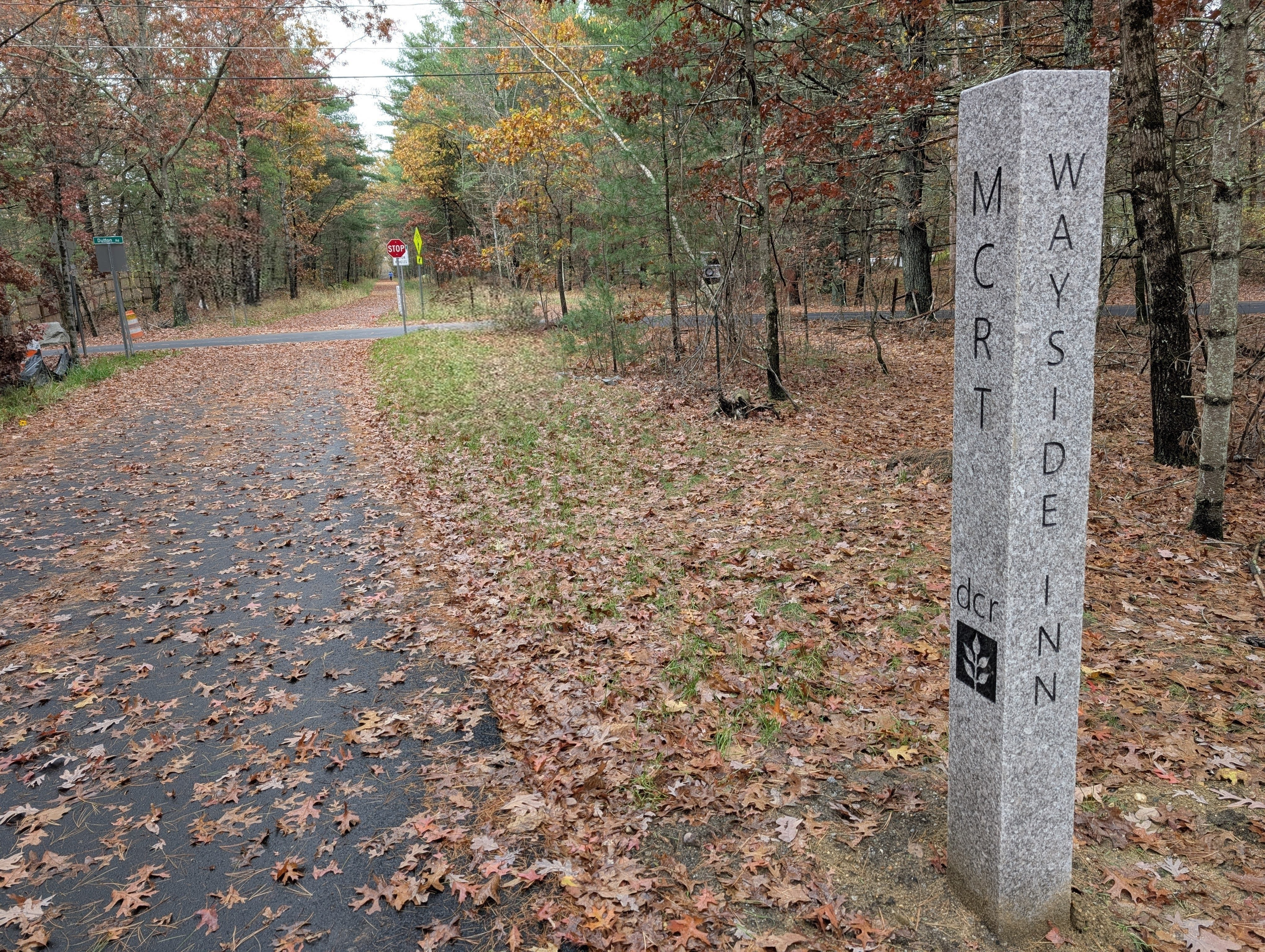
- The former station site in October 2025, with historical granite marker installed by DCR as part of the Mass Central Rail Trail—Wayside project.

General information
- Location: Sudbury, Massachusetts
- Coordinates: 42.374467°N 71.456761°W
- Owner: Boston and Maine Railroad when closed Site now owned by MBTA
- Lines: Central Massachusetts Branch (Boston & Maine)
- Platforms: 1 (former)
- Tracks: 1 (former)

History
- Opened: 1 October 1881
- Closed: Before 1944
- Rebuilt: 1897

Former services
Preceding station	Boston and Maine Railroad	Following station
Ordway toward Northampton	Central Mass Branch	South Sudbury toward Boston
Location

Wayside Inn station was a flag stop station in Sudbury, Massachusetts.

== History ==
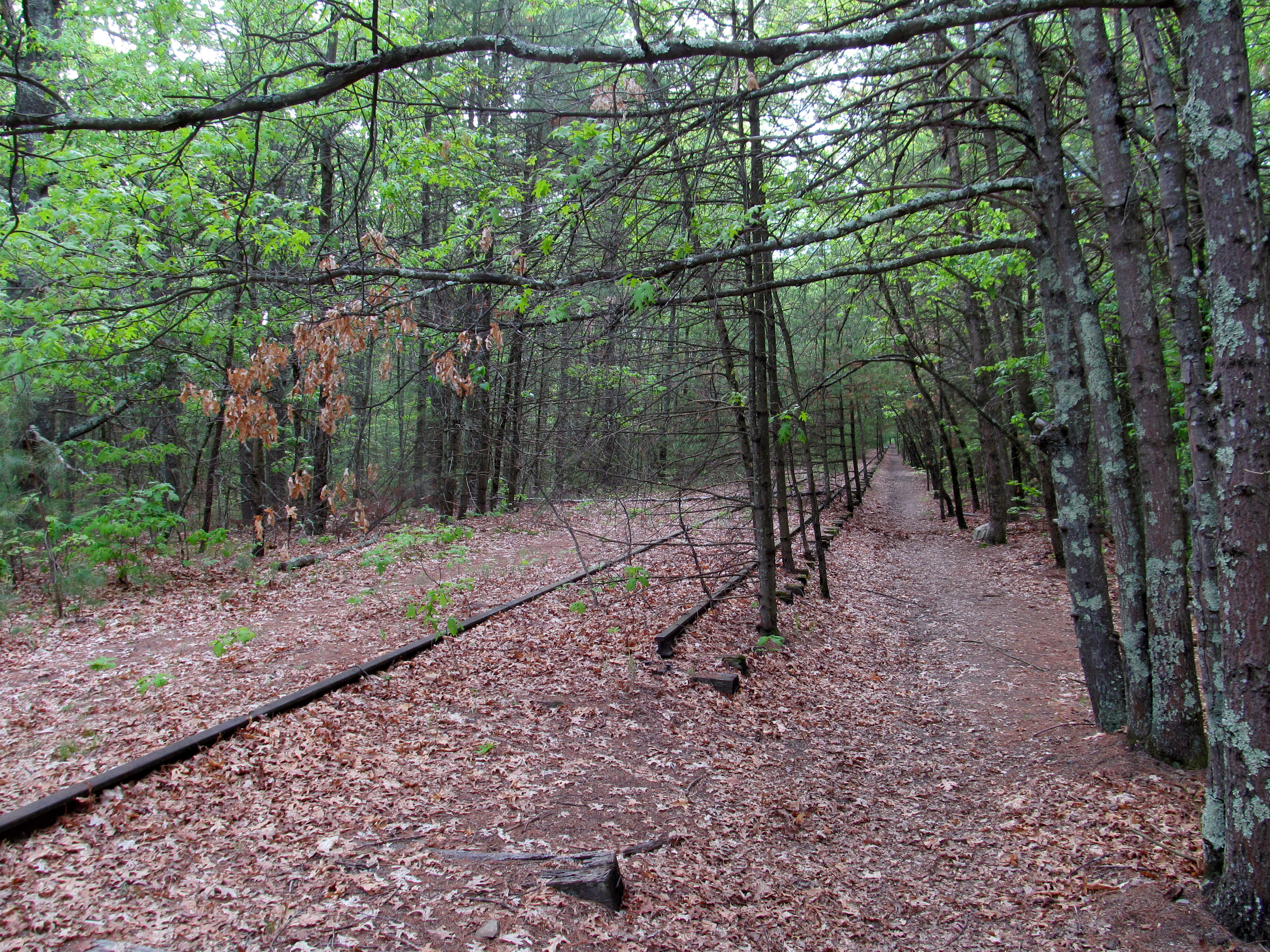
The former station site in 2017

Created by the Massachusetts Central Railroad in 1881 as a simple platform, it was named for the Wayside Inn approximately a mile south, to which it provided service. By 1885 the successor Central Massachusetts Railroad provided service, and by 1887 the Boston and Maine Railroad (B&M) leased the ROW and named it the Central Massachusetts Branch. By 1897 a shelter building was built by B&M. The building was burned down by vandals sometime in the 1940s and no remains of it are visible today.

The small wooden shelter was built in a Japanese style, as nearly all consecutive stations on the line were built in a unique style to create the illusion of variety. The name of the architect responsible for their design has been lost to time. The station was located on Dutton Road in what is now the Wayside Inn Historic District. Passengers included innkeeper Edward Lemon, Babe Ruth and Henry Ford.

In 2022, a buried transmission line project between Sudbury and Hudson began construction under the former Massachusetts Central Railroad ROW for which it provided service. This project subsidized the cost of building a section of the Mass Central Rail Trail—Wayside, which was named for this station and the Inn, and which completed construction in 2025. As part of this project, DCR installed a granite marker to commemorate the archaeological site.
