= Mass Central Rail Trail—Wayside =

Partially completed rail trail in Massachusetts

- Mass Central Rail Trail—Wayside roundabout, with diamond monument to Mass Central Railroad, in South Sudbury. October 2026.
- Length: 16 miles (26 km) open, 23 miles (37 km) when complete
- Location: Waltham, Massachusetts to Berlin, Massachusetts
- Established: 2010 DCR lease for construction signed, 2014 first MCRT—Wayside section built
- Use: Hiking, bicycling, inline skating, wheelchairs, strollers, cross-country skiing, horseback riding
- Difficulty: Easy
- Season: Year-round
- Surface: Paved, stone dust (to be paved), unimproved
- Right of way: MBTA owned, former Massachusetts Central Railroad and later Central Mass Branch
- Maintainer: Department of Conservation and Recreation
- Website: mass.gov/info-details/mass-central-rail-trail-wayside masscentralrailtrail.org

Mass Central Rail Trail—Wayside map
- Green: Complete; Purple: In Design

The Mass Central Rail Trail—Wayside (MCRT—Wayside) is a partially completed, 23-mile (37 km) rail trail in Waltham, Weston, Wayland, Sudbury, Marlborough, Hudson, Stow, Bolton, and Berlin, Massachusetts. The trail is a Department of Conservation and Recreation (DCR) state park along the right-of-way (ROW) of the former Massachusetts Central Railroad and later, former MBTA Central Mass Branch. The MCRT—Wayside currently has 16 miles (26 km) open, and the remaining miles are in design. The MCRT—Wayside is part of the larger Mass Central Rail Trail between Boston and Northampton.

== Route description ==
All 23 miles (37 km) of the MCRT—Wayside, once built, form a state park owned by the MBTA and maintained by the DCR, except for a 0.75-mile (1.21 km) section owned and maintained by the Town of Hudson, as it is shared with the Assabet River Rail Trail. As of 2026, the MCRT—Wayside has 16 miles (26 km) open—representing 71% of the total route—while the remaining 29% is currently in design. All completed sections of the MCRT—Wayside are asphalt paved, and DCR plans to pave both all sections under construction and the only section that is currently stone dust in Wayland. While the MBTA ROW is 50 to 100 feet (15 to 30 m) wide, DCR leased trail sections are 19 feet (5.8 m) wide, known as the "Path Development Corridor", consisting of a paved path, typically 10 or 12 feet (3.0 or 3.7 m) wide, with grass shoulders, grading, and additional side clearance.

Mass Central Rail Trail—Wayside segments (east to west)
Segment endpoints	Municipality	Length	Surface	Status	Year opened
Beaver Street to Border Road (Except Linden Street Bridge)	Waltham	2.75 miles (4.4 km)	Asphalt	Complete	2023
↳ Linden Street Bridge	Waltham	0.02 miles (0.04 km)	Asphalt	Complete	2025
Border Road to Hillside Road	Waltham	0.3 miles (0.48 km)	Asphalt	Complete	2014
Hillside Road to Jones Road	Waltham	0.5 miles (0.80 km)	Unimproved	In Design	
Jones Road to Stony Brook Bridge	Waltham, Weston	0.3 miles (0.48 km)	Asphalt	Complete	2025
Stony Brook Bridge to Cochituate Road	Weston, Wayland	4.4 miles (7.1 km)	Asphalt	Complete	2019
Cochituate Road to Route 20	Wayland	0.5 miles (0.80 km)	Stone dust	Complete (asphalt in design)	2017
Route 20 to Sudbury substation	Wayland, Sudbury	1.4 miles (2.3 km)	Unimproved	In Design	
Sudbury substation to Wilkins Street	Sudbury, Marlborough, Stow, Hudson	7.6 miles (12.2 km)	Asphalt	Complete	2026
Wilkins Street to Priest Street (Shared with Assabet River Rail Trail)	Hudson	0.75 miles (1.2 km)	Asphalt	Complete	2005
Priest Street to Felton Street	Hudson	1.0 mile (1.6 km)	Unimproved	In Design	
Felton Street to Central Street	Hudson	1.6 miles (2.6 km)	Unimproved	In Design	
Central Street to Coburn Road	Hudson, Bolton, Berlin	2.3 miles (3.7 km)	Unimproved	In Design	

==== Waltham ====
- Beaver Street to Border Road

In Waltham, the MCRT—Wayside begins at Beaver Street, at the location of the former Clematis Brook Station, and this 2.75-mile (4.43 km) paved section is complete. Waltham funded the approximately $9 million cost of construction of its section from City revenues. Construction began in 2022 and was substantially complete by September 2023. The timber trestle bridge over Clematis Brook was rehabilitated with new decking and timber bridge railings, stone abutments, and concrete piles. This section passes by Waltham Highlands station. From Beaver Street to the Linden Street bridge, it is an example of rails with trails with the MBTA Fitchburg Line.

- Linden Street Bridge

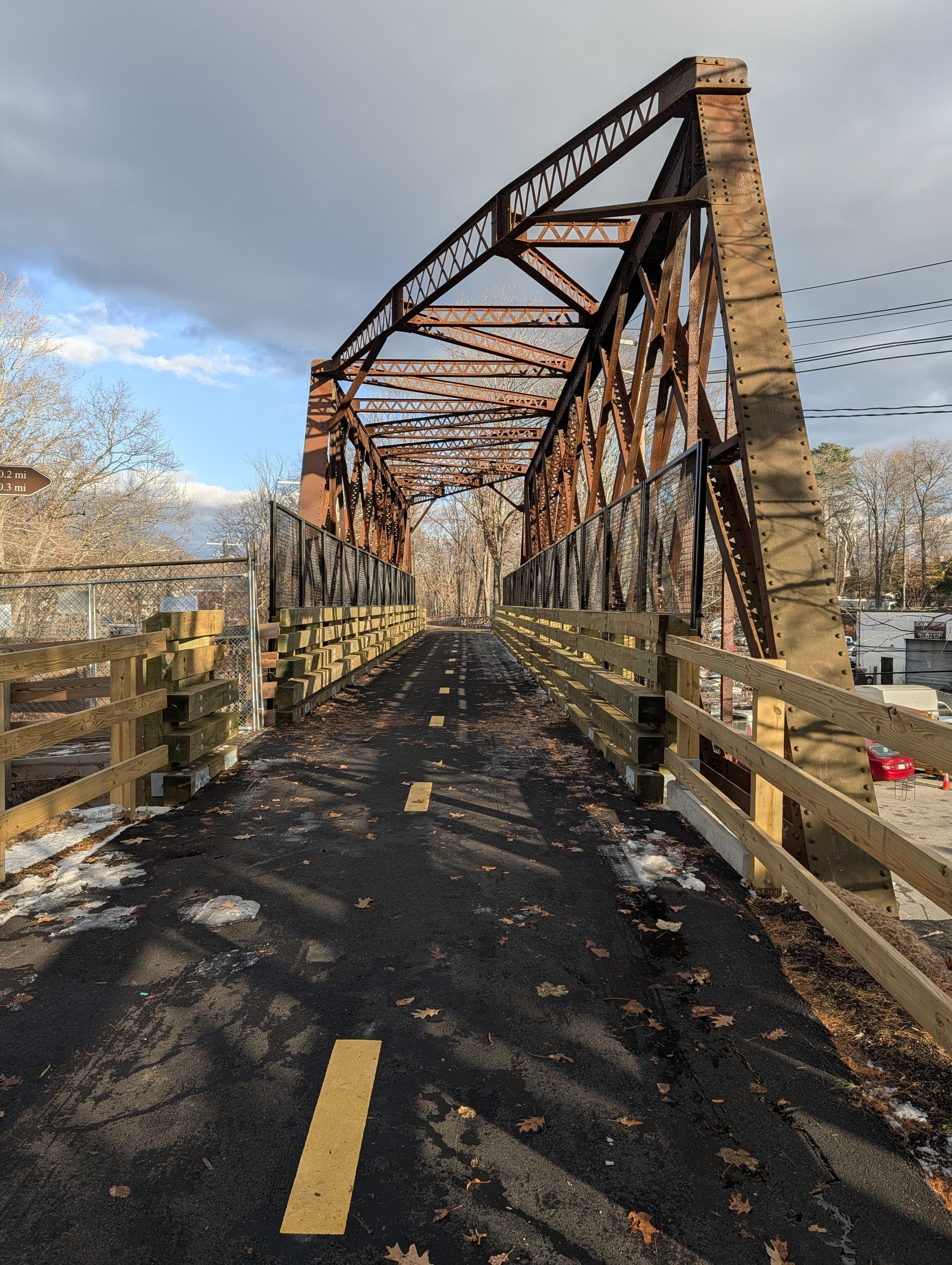
Linden Street Bridge, a lattice truss bridge, opened December 2025

The Linden Street Bridge rehabilitation, in between the Waltham section above, is 120 feet (37 m) and complete. Waltham received matching MassTrails grants in 2022 and 2023 to fund construction; however, DCR eventually funded reconstruction of the bridge. The bridge was built in 1894 and is a lattice truss bridge on granite abutments. In 2002, the Wayside Rail Trail Committee held the Golden Spike 2002 event adjacent to the bridge, where statewide advocates unified on the Mass Central Rail Trail name for the greater project between Boston and Northampton. Construction began in December 2024 and completed in December 2025.

- Border Road to Hillside Road

This 0.3-mile (0.48 km) paved Waltham section from slightly east of Border Road to Hillside Road was the first completed section of the MCRT—Wayside. It was built in 2014 in partnership with the 1265 Main Street Phase 1 development.

- Hillside Road to Jones Road
MCRT—Wayside, Hillside Road to Jones Road

Green: Complete Purple: In Design Blue: Green Street Connector Shared Use Path (In Design) Pink: Route 117 / Main Street Shared Use Path (In Design)

This 0.5-mile (0.80 km) Waltham section of the MCRT—Wayside is unimproved and in design, and a timeline for construction is undetermined. The official rail trail project will rehabilitate the existing railroad bridge over Route 128/I-95, a two-span plate girder bridge on concrete abutments and a pier built in 1960. This section reached 25% design together with the Jones Road to Stony Brook Bridge section completed in 2025, before DCR split the two trail projects so planned roadway work near I-95 would not delay construction of the Jones Road to Stony Brook Bridge segment..

- Planned off-trail shared use path alternative (Hillside Road to Green Street)

While the DCR rail bridge over I-95 remains unfunded for construction, two separate roadway infrastructure projects outside the MCRT—Wayside ROW include new shared use paths between Hillside Road and Green Street. Together, the paths would create a nearly complete alternative route to the MCRT—Wayside trail gap in Waltham.

- Green Street Connector

A public-private partnership tied to a nearby mixed-use development will extend Green Street parallel to the western side of I-95 from Route 117 / Main Street to Weston Street, including a side-running shared use path. As of 2026, construction was estimated to begin in July 2026 and finish in 2028 or 2029. First proposed in the MassDOT Route 128/I-95 Land Use & Transportation Study, the corridor could eventually integrate with a relocated Kendal Green MBTA commuter rail multi-modal center at Jones Road.

- Route 117 / Main Street Bridge Replacement

MassDOT will replace the existing Route 117 / Main Street highway bridge over Route 128/I-95 and add a shared-use path linking the MCRT—Wayside at Hillside Road to the Green Street Connector, alongside pedestrian upgrades at the Green Street intersection. Construction is scheduled to begin in 2030 and conclude in 2031 or 2032.

==== Waltham, Weston, Wayland, Sudbury ====
- Jones Road to Stony Brook Bridge

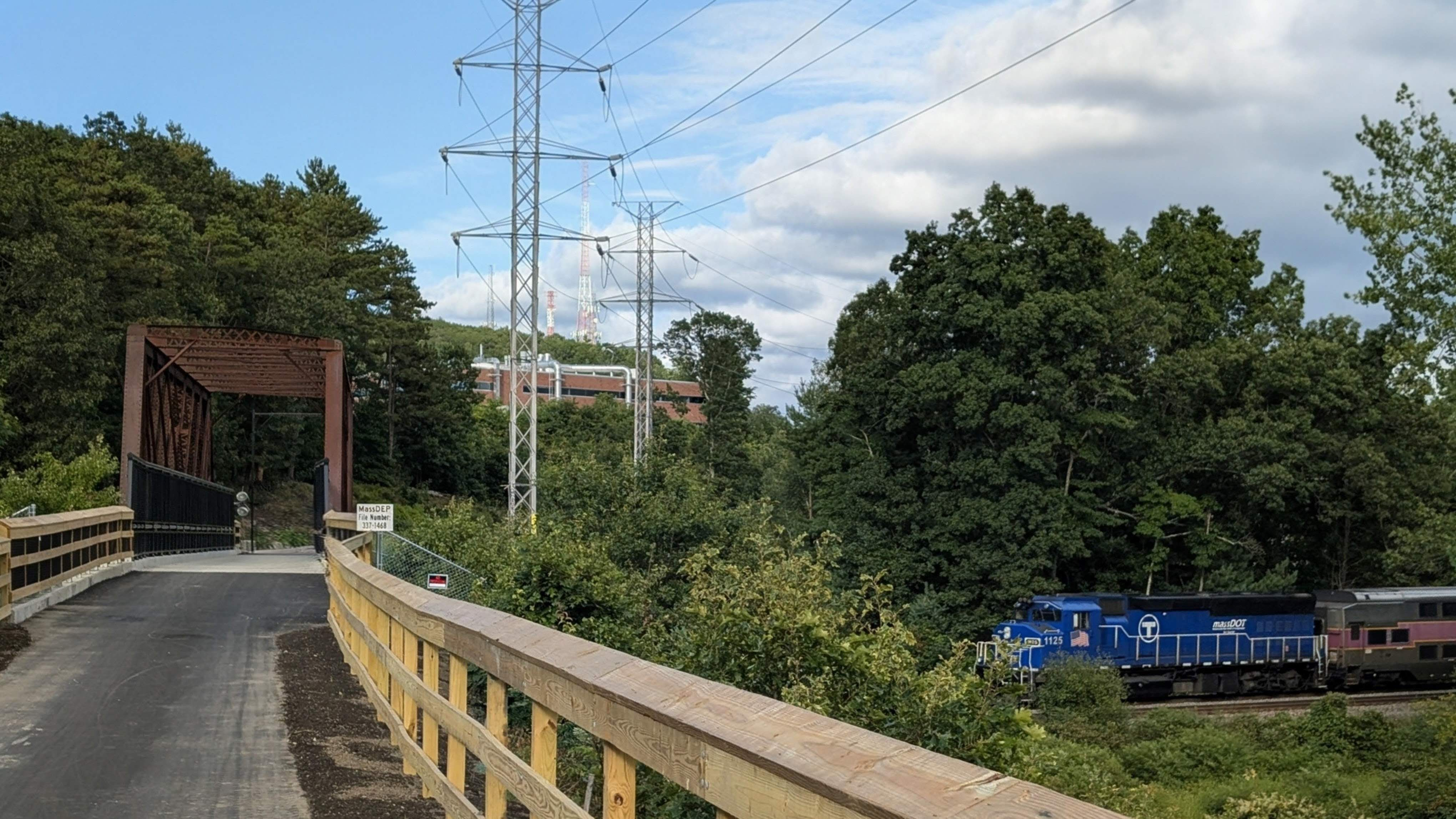
Stony Brook Bridge, a lattice truss bridge over the Fitchburg Line in Weston, opened August 2025

The 0.3-mile (0.48 km) section from Jones Road, Waltham to slightly west of the Stony Brook Bridge over the MBTA Fitchburg Line in Weston, is paved and complete. This section rehabilitated the existing Stony Brook bridge over the MBTA Fitchburg Line. The Stony Brook bridge was built in 1896 and is a riveted lattice truss bridge on stone abutments. The design of the bridge was based on the Norwottuck Rail Trail Bridge along with the Linden Street Bridge, and the three are the only remaining examples of riveted lattice truss bridges in Massachusetts. In December 2023, Governor Maura Healey announced leftover American Rescue Plan Act funding would be used for construction, and DCR issued a notice to proceed in 2024. Construction completed in August 2025.

- Stony Brook Bridge to Cochituate Road

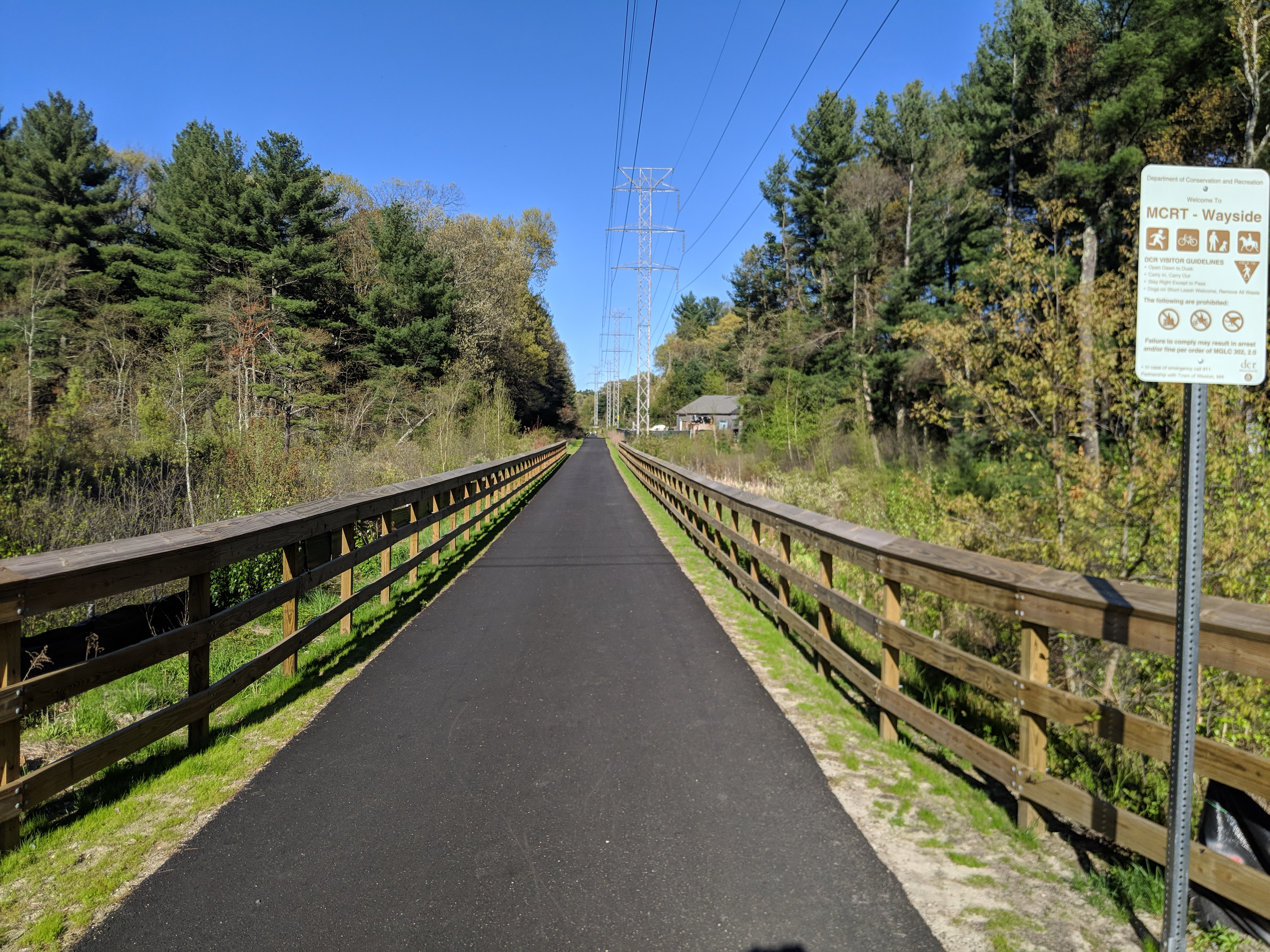
MCRT—Wayside in Weston

The 4.4-mile (7.1 km) paved section from slightly west of the Stony Brook Bridge in Weston to Cochituate Road, Wayland is complete. DCR paved the access road and installed safe road crossings in 2019, in partnership with Eversource and Weston. This section passes by the historic Wayland Freight House and Weston Depot.

- Cochituate Road to Route 20

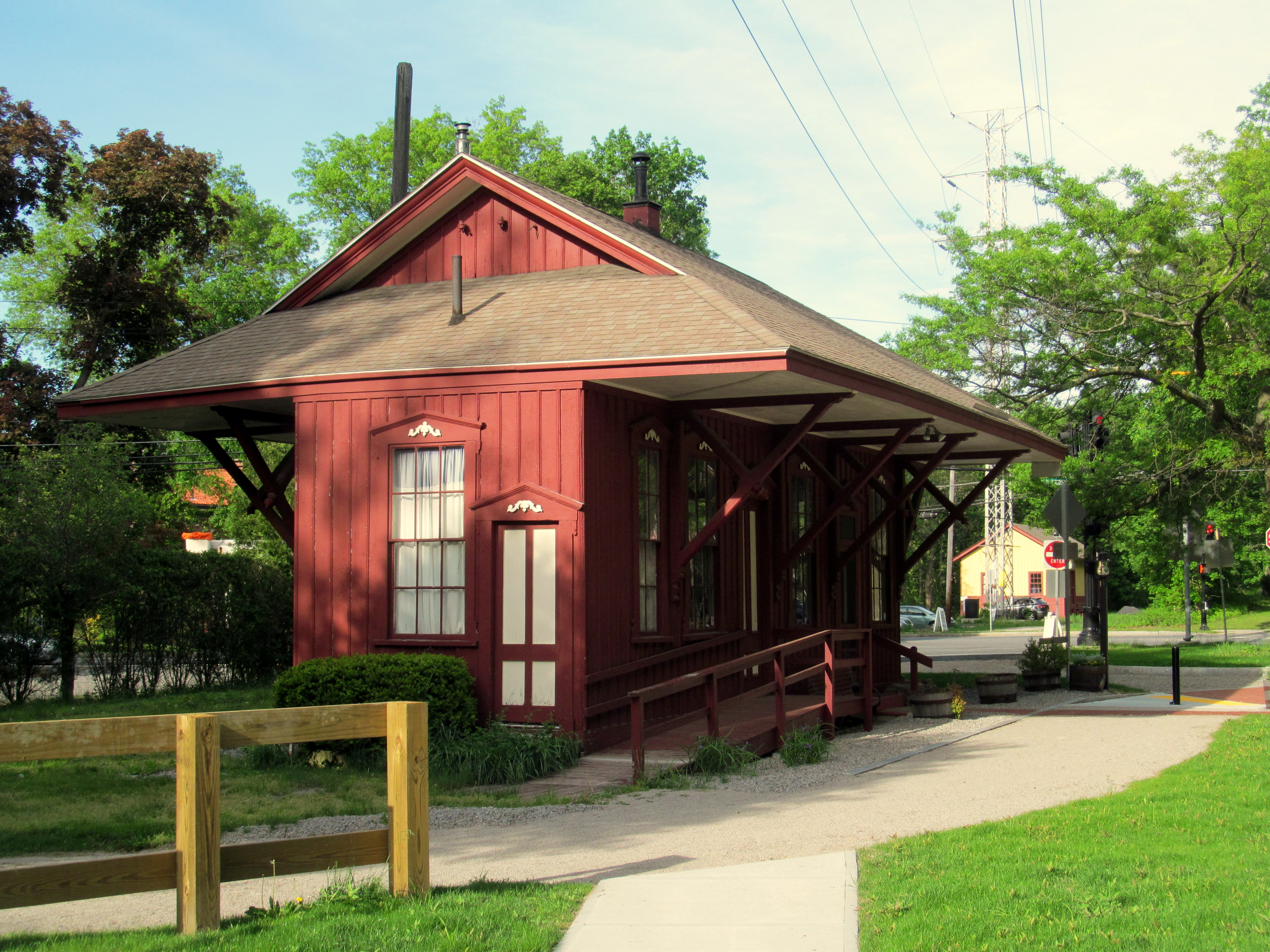
The MCRT—Wayside passes Wayland station

This 0.5-mile (0.80 km) Wayland section is complete with a stone dust surface, and an asphalt surface improvement is in design. The stone dust surface was installed by the Town of Wayland in 2017. The trail includes a historic railway turntable. The improvement project is scheduled to begin construction in Winter 2027. This section passes by Wayland station.

- Route 20 to Sudbury substation

The 1.4-mile (2.3 km) section from Route 20 in Wayland to the Eversource Sudbury substation is unimproved and in design. Running east to west, the corridor crosses the boundary between Wayland and Sudbury twice. This project additionally includes paving the 0.5-mile (0.80 km) stone dust trail in Wayland to Cochituate Road. This project received state funding for construction in 2021, and as of 2026 is at 100% design to construct a paved trail. Construction is scheduled to begin in late 2027 to early 2028. DCR once hoped to move the date forward to better align with the Sudbury-Hudson section's construction and completion. There is a timber trestle bridge over the Sudbury River. The trail will offer scenic views of the Great Meadows National Wildlife Refuge including a planned timber lookout, but the Great Meadows hiking trails will not directly connect to the MCRT.

==== Sudbury, Marlborough, Stow, Hudson ====
- Sudbury substation to Wilkins Street

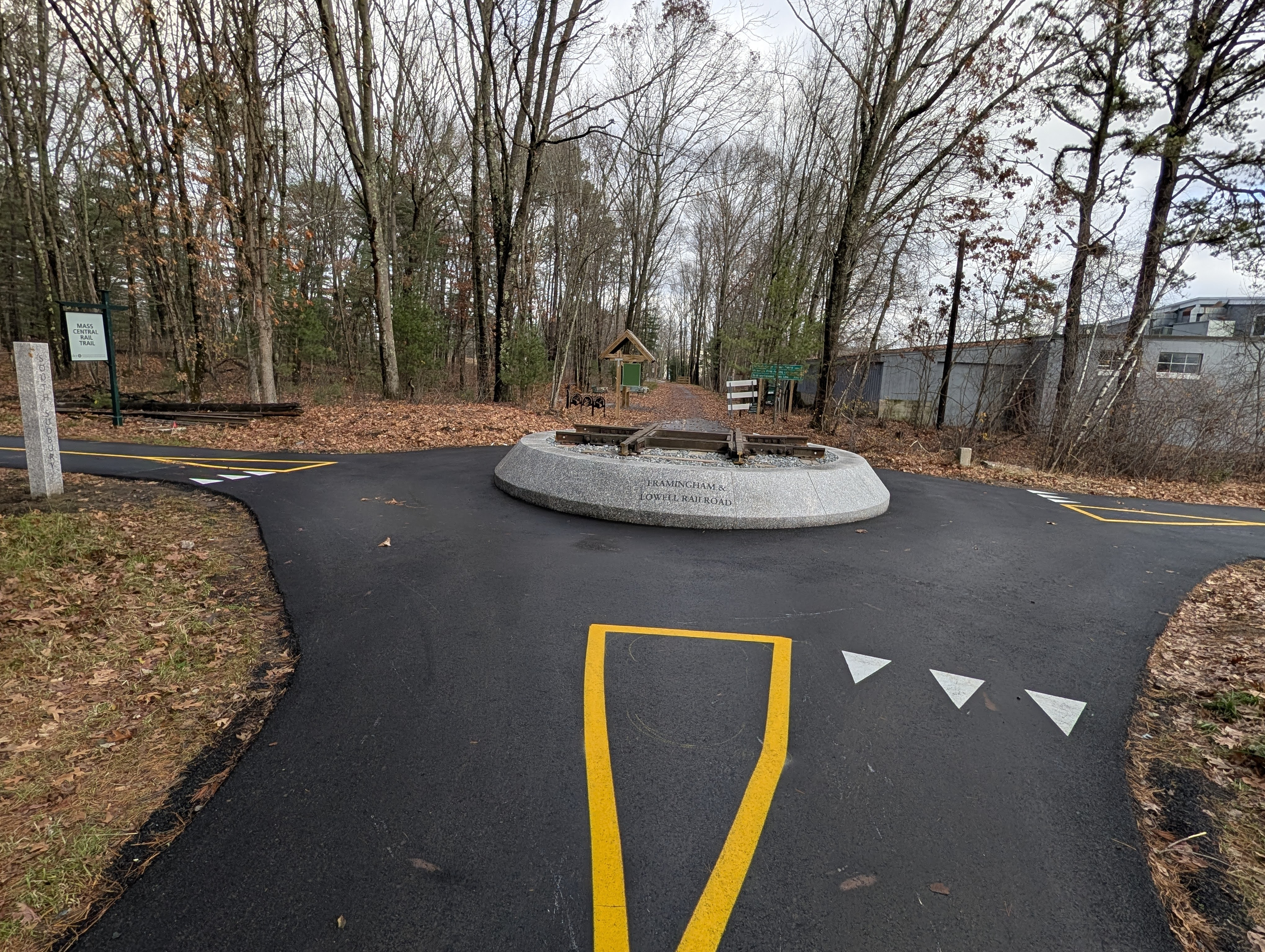
MCRT—Wayside (east-west) and Bruce Freeman Rail Trail (north) roundabout. Railroad diamond placed on top of monument.

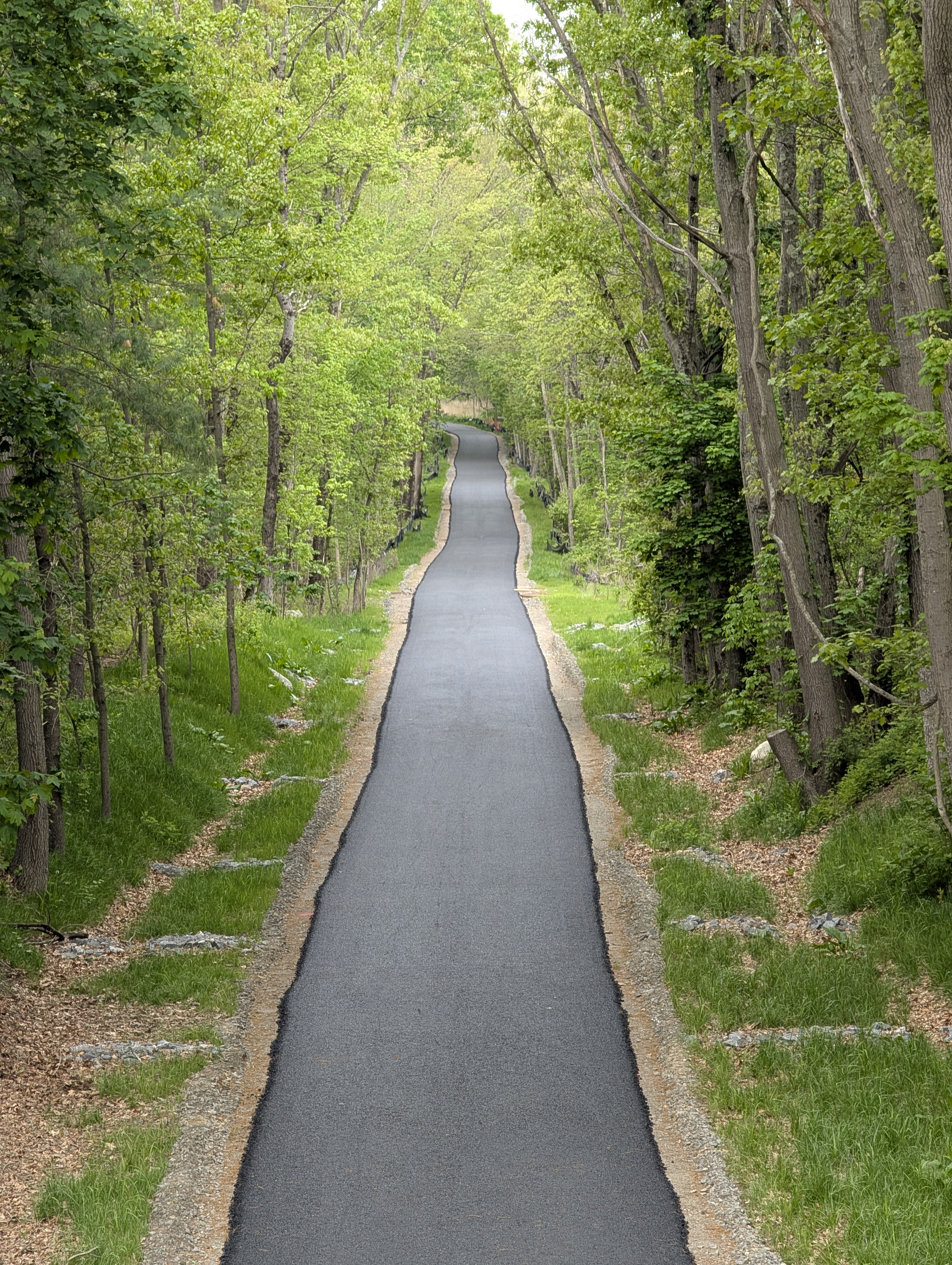
MCRT—Wayside at former East Sudbury station site, a portion of the 7.6 mile Sudbury-to-Hudson segment.

Paving on the 7.6-mile (12.2 km) section from the Eversource Sudbury substation to Wilkins Street in Hudson finished in late 2025, with the trail officially completed in July 2026 following roadway crossing improvements. The section runs west from Sudbury across a corner of Marlborough into Hudson, briefly entering Stow for 327 feet (100 m) before re-entering Hudson. Eversource's buried power line construction, which included the pedestrian bridges and a gravel access road, was completed in November 2024. Bridge 127 in Sudbury was a riveted plate deck girder bridge, built in 1881. Over time, it had submerged into Hop Brook, damaging the piers and steel, and making it unsafe for the MCRT. Bridge 130 over Fort Meadow Brook in Hudson was a timber trestle bridge, destroyed by fire in 2019. Both bridges were replaced by prefabricated structural steel truss bridges in 2024. Bridge 128, also over Hop Brook in Sudbury, was built in 1881. It is a riveted plate deck girder bridge with granite abutments and timber piers. It received a new timber deck and railing, preserving the girders, piers, cross frames, and the majority of the abutments. A new precast arch pedestrian tunnel was installed under Chestnut Street in Hudson. This section passes by South Sudbury station adjacent to the former railroad crossing, with tracks forming a diamond that was preserved inside a new trail roundabout, and the historic Sudbury Section Tool House. The Wayside Inn Railroad Waiting Room was a B&M station at the Dutton Road crossing for which the MCRT—Wayside is named. DCR acquired American Rescue Plan Act funding for construction which began in February 2025 and paved the trail. While completed in 2025, additional roadway crossing improvements pushed the official opening to July 2026. The American Public Works Association honored the MCRT Sudbury to Hudson segment with a 2026 Project of the Year award, in the Small Cities/Rural Communities: Historical Restoration/Preservation category.

==== Hudson ====
- Wilkins Street to Priest Street

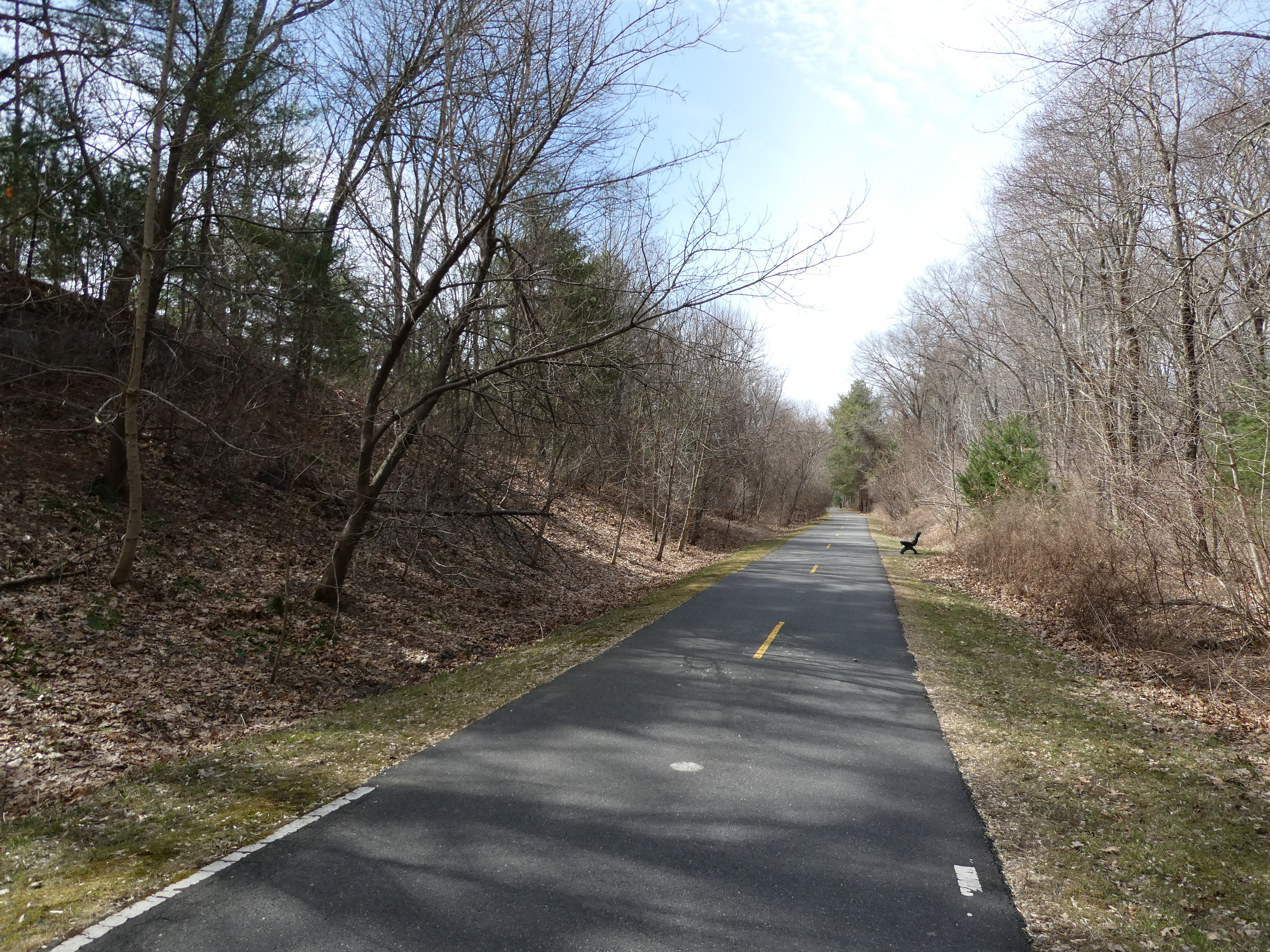
MCRT—Wayside & Assabet River Rail Trail at the former location of Gleason Junction, Hudson

This 0.75-mile (1.21 km) Hudson section was asphalt paved and completed as part of the Assabet River Rail Trail (ARRT) built by 2005, except for the MA-62 bridge over the Assabet River which was rebuilt in 2010. Hudson designated this ARRT section to be shared with the MCRT—Wayside by 2023. This arrangement is a cost-saving measure, including eliminating the cost of rehabilitating a timber trestle bridge over the Assabet River to the northwest of the section. The unimproved ROW, intersecting the completed trail at the former Gleason Junction, runs northwest and southeast.

- Priest Street to Felton Street

The downtown Hudson 1-mile (1.6 km) section is unimproved and in design. This section includes a timber trestle bridge over Bruce's Pond used by pedestrians, despite the unimproved state. In 2023 and 2025, MassTrails grants were awarded for design of this section and the west Hudson section. In June 2025, Hudson announced full funding for 100% design of this section.

- Felton Street to Central Street

The west Hudson 1.6-mile (2.6 km) section is unimproved and in design. In 2023 and 2025, MassTrails grants were awarded for design of this section and the downtown Hudson section. Design work for this section will proceed following design for the downtown Hudson section.

==== Hudson, Bolton, Berlin ====
- Central Street to Coburn Road

This 2.3-mile (3.7 km) section from Central Street, Hudson to Coburn Road in Berlin is in design. It is unimproved, overgrown, and is missing some original bridges. The brief Bolton section is just 100 feet (30 m). In 2024, a MassTrails grant for preliminary design of this MCRT—Wayside section was awarded, as well as a feasibility study for all of the MCRT in Berlin to the Clinton border. In 2026, a MassTrails grant for 25% design of this section was awarded. An advocacy group, Berlin Trail Trust, is promoting the construction of the Mass Central Rail Trail in Berlin.

=== Connecting trails ===
==== MCRT connections ====
As a part of the Mass Central Rail Trail (MCRT) from Boston to Northampton, in-design segments of the MCRT will connect to the MCRT—Wayside in both directions. Heading east, after a short unimproved section from Beaver Street to the Belmont border, the Belmont Community Path (BCP) is in design. After the BCP, the MCRT is complete to Boston through many paths and parks, including the Fitchburg Cutoff Path, the Cambridge Linear Park, and the Somerville Community Path. Heading west, the Berlin Rail Trail is in design, as is the MCRT in Clinton, before reaching completed MCRT sections starting with the Wachusett Dam Hike and the MCRT sections built by Wachusett Greenways.

==== Additional trail connections ====
In Hudson, the MCRT—Wayside connects with the Assabet River Rail Trail and the Marlborough-Sudbury State Forest/Goodale Lot hiking trails. In Sudbury, it connects with the Bruce Freeman Rail Trail Phase 2D, at the site of the Sudbury diamond. There are also many connections to hiking trails including the Assabet River National Wildlife Refuge, the City of Marlborough Desert Natural Area, the Town of Sudbury Hop Brook Marsh Conservation Land, and Sudbury Valley Trustees Memorial Forest. In Wayland, a portion of the trail is shared with the Bay Circuit Trail and the East Coast Greenway. In Weston, there are many connections to hiking trails including Jericho Town Forest and Sears Conservation Land. In Waltham, there is a connection to the hiking trails in Prospect Hill Park. The Western Greenway to MCRT connection received a 2023 MassTrails grant for design and permitting.

== History ==
By 1971, passenger service on the Central Mass Branch west of Waltham, subsidized by the Massachusetts Bay Transportation Authority (MBTA) since 1964, had ended due to low ridership. In 1972, Governor Francis Sargent initiated a Commuter Rail Improvement Program which concluded that, while too early to restore service on the Central Mass Branch, acquisition from the Boston and Maine Railroad (B&M) to preserve the Central Mass Branch ROW and other ROWs would be prudent. In December 1976, the MBTA purchased from B&M 270 miles (430 km) of ROW across Massachusetts for $39.5 million, although 130 miles (210 km), including the Central Mass Branch, were not in commuter rail service. B&M retained various freight rail service obligations over the ROWs for several more years. By 1977, the MBTA had acquired title ownership of all of these ROWs in fee simple, a portion from the 1976 purchase and a portion by order of taking. By 1980, a permanent discontinuance of the B&M's freight obligations for the Central Mass Branch west of Waltham was approved. The final train on the Central Mass Branch ROW, freight in Waltham between Bacon Street and Clematis Brook, ran in 1994. In 1996, the MBTA produced the "Central Mass. Commuter Rail Feasibility Study", which advised reactivation of the Central Mass Branch between Berlin and Waltham would not be cost effective. In 1997, a "Central Massachusetts Rail Trail Feasibility Study" was commissioned for $30k by the Massachusetts Turnpike Authority, which found construction of a 25-mile (40 km) trail to be feasible. The proposed trail was quickly renamed the Wayside Rail Trail by the Wayside Rail Trail Committee, a 501(c)(3) nonprofit, as the Wayside Inn / Wayside Inn Railroad Waiting Room was a B&M station at the crossing with Dutton Road. All seven municipalities from Berlin to Belmont (excepting Bolton, Stow, and Marlborough, as their shortest sections were expected to be bundled with their surrounding sections) initially approved the trail by large margins. However, a follow up Weston Special Town meeting voted 698 against and 410 in favor, which derailed progress on the Wayside Rail Trail for at least two decades. In 2006, theft of a section of rail was discovered in Berlin, which encouraged the MBTA to take a more active role maintaining the property. By 2010, the DCR executed a 99-year lease with the MBTA to build what was finally renamed the Mass Central Rail Trail—Wayside, combining the Wayside name with the future vision of the Mass Central Rail Trail from Boston to Northampton. The MCRT—Wayside lease is 23 miles (37 km) from Berlin to Waltham. Under the terms of the lease with DCR, the MBTA retains the right to reactivate commuter rail. While this arrangement is similar to federal railbanking law, a request from Sudbury to act as a railbanking trail sponsor was denied by the Surface Transportation Board. Railbanking is a voluntary process, and the MBTA did not consent to it. In 2011, a study to include a busway alongside the trail was commissioned by the Metropolitan Area Planning Council, a public agency. The state rejected the busway portion of the proposal. In 2014, the Massachusetts Executive Office of Energy and Environmental Affairs (EOEEA) determined the trail did not require further Massachusetts Environmental Policy Act review, simplifying permitting.

=== Weston and Wayland ===
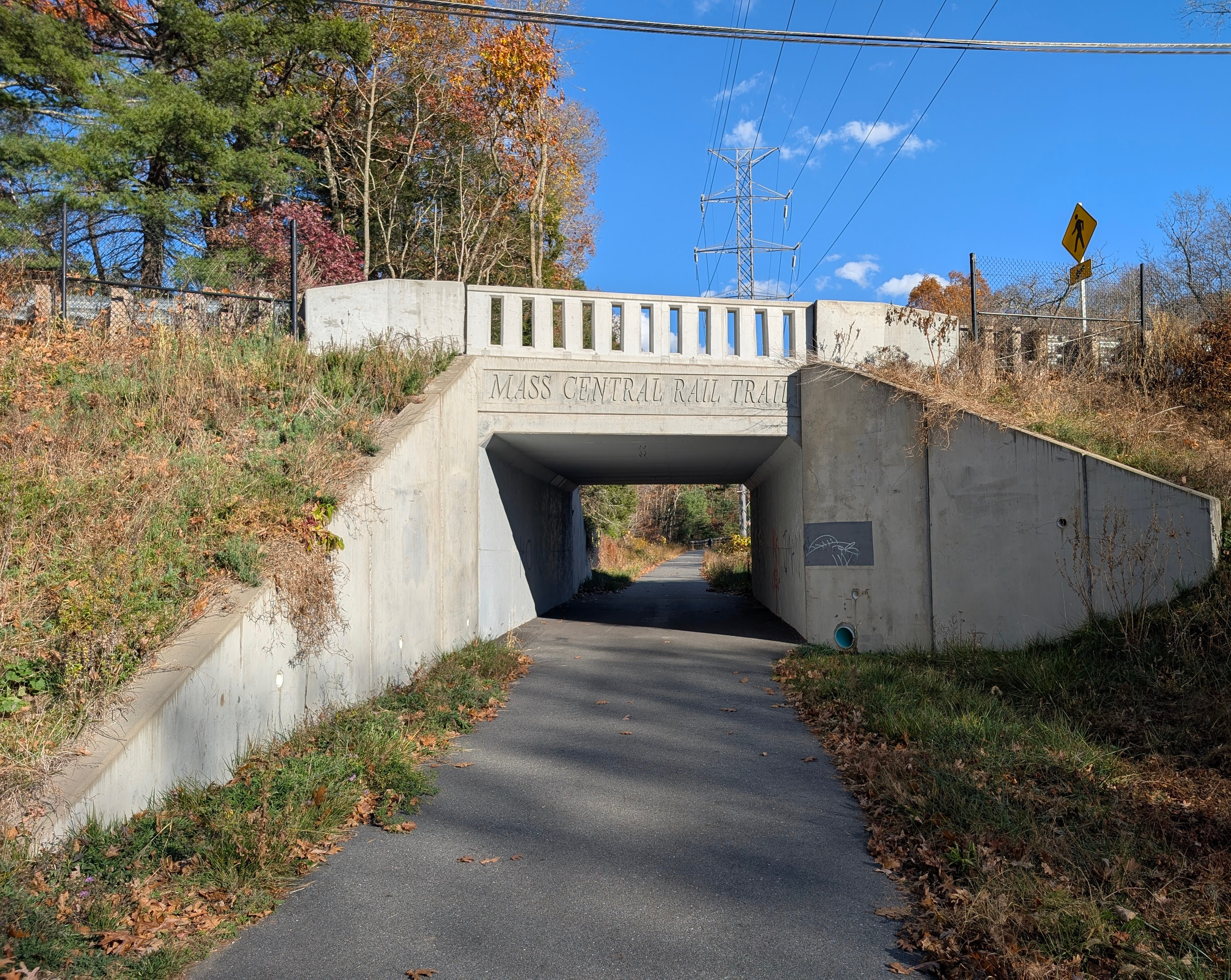
The Conant Road underpass

In 1951, the Boston Edison Company (BECo) acquired an easement along this section of the B&M's ROW and built overhead power lines. In 2016, BECo's successor, Eversource, filed permits to build a gravel access road for the power lines over what had become the MBTA's ROW. This included a trail section running from Cochituate Road in Wayland to slightly west of the Stony Brook Bridge over the MBTA Fitchburg Line in Weston. This reduced construction costs of the trail by about $2 million, and in partnership, the DCR made the decision in January 2017 to build the trail by paving the access road and installing safe road crossings, which completed in 2019. Eversource approached Weston for cooperation, sparking Weston's decision to participate, reversing the negative 1997 Town vote. Weston assisted construction by forming a Rail Trail Committee and providing recommendations, officially thanked DCR and Eversource for their contributions to the trail, and now supports the completion of the entire MCRT. At Conant Road, the former wooden bridge built in 1937 was demolished and filled with dirt in 1988. With public concern the original design lacked funding for a safe passing of Conant Road, Weston performed a feasibility study for the underpass in 2017, which was completed in partnership with DCR in 2019.

=== Sudbury, Hudson, and Stow ===
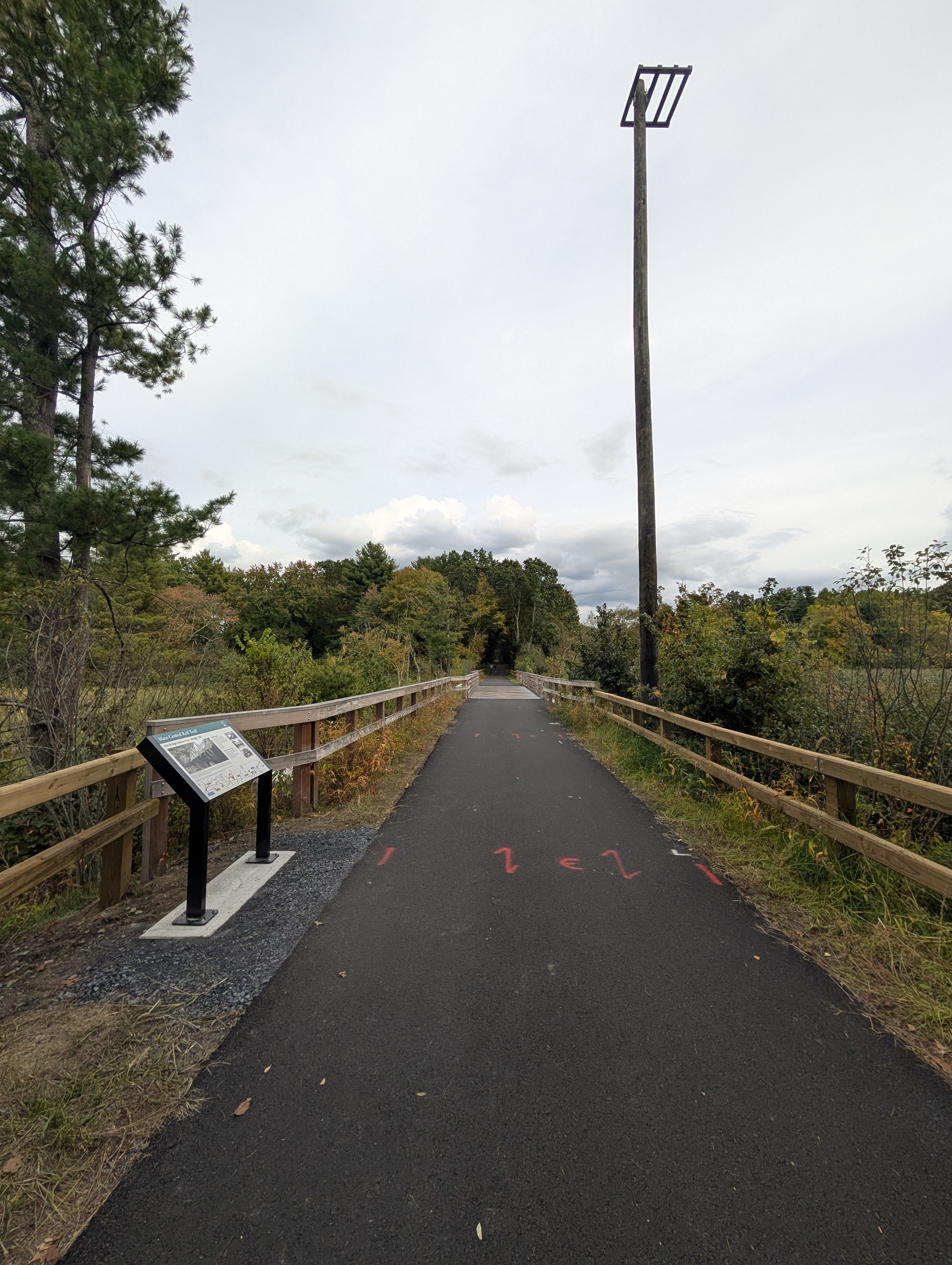
Bridge 128 over Hop Brook, Sudbury. Eversource preserved the circa 1881 substructure, and installed the osprey platform and native woody plants.

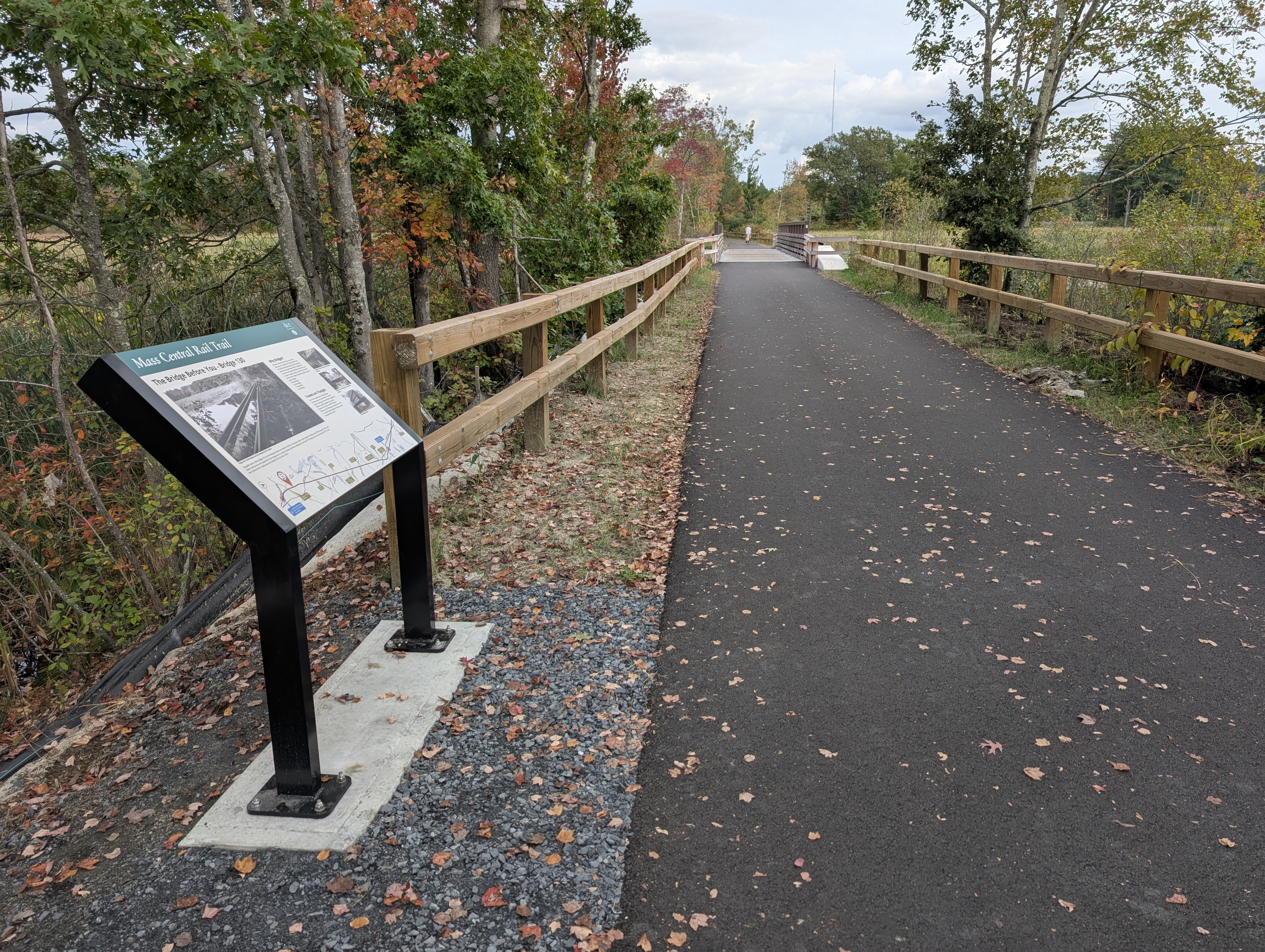
Bridge 130 over Fort Meadow Brook, Hudson. The former railroad timber trestle bridge, built in 1939, was destroyed by fire. Both bridges received ADA-accessible decking and fencing, installed by Eversource. Both bridges had pavement and interpretive signs installed by DCR.

Based on a 2013 forecast, in 2015 ISO New England issued a Greater Boston area needs assessment, directing utility companies to investigate a series of transmission projects to improve electrical grid reliability, including a connection of the Eversource substation in Sudbury to Hudson Light & Power. Beginning in January 2014, Eversource conducted meetings with federal, state, and municipal officials regarding routing the potential Sudbury to Hudson Transmission Reliability Project. In September 2014, Sudbury Town Meeting voted in overwhelming support of advancing the MCRT, and in December 2014 voted in overwhelming support to make all reasonable efforts to secure funding for a asphalt paved surface MCRT. In January 2015, Sudbury officials noted a Eversource route along the MBTA ROW, either overhead or underground, was an opportunity for construction of the MCRT—Wayside at no cost to the town. With the news of a possibility to build the trail without local funding, Sudbury officials and a May 2015 Town vote decided against local funding efforts to accelerate a proposed trail build with a crushed stone surface first. By November 2015, Sudbury and Hudson officials had formally requested Eversource evaluate an underground design for the transmission lines along the MBTA ROW, which Eversource did by February 2016. By January 2017, the MBTA required this underground route as part of an option agreement with Eversource, at the cost of forgoing approximately $2 million compared to an overhead option. The MBTA also required Eversource to work with DCR to create a trail. In turn, in April 2017, when Eversource sought project approval from the Massachusetts Energy Facilities Siting Board (EFSB), Eversource preferred such an underground MBTA ROW route, though as part of the approval process, Eversource was required to evaluate alternative options. Only the preferred, underground MBTA ROW route was endorsed by the DCR. The underground transmission project benefited DCR by reducing trail construction costs in the range of $6 to $10 million, and required Eversource to make several bridge improvements the trail required. The Town of Stow Conservation Commission unanimously endorsed the buried transmission project in 2017, in part because it would help build the MCRT. The preferred underground MBTA ROW route was approved by the EFSB in 2019. The EFSB decision noted the associated benefits of the trail, but stated the EFSB's approval of the transmission project was independent of the trail benefits. Designed and permitted in partnership with the DCR, the Eversource project built a gravel sub-base for the trail and grass shoulders, restored or rebuilt three trail bridges, and built a trail tunnel under Chestnut Street in Hudson. Restorative work included mechanical removal of 3.5 acres of invasive plants, the installation of over 2000 native woody plants, and existing vernal pool enhancements. Eversource originally expected to complete the buried power project in December 2019, however the start of construction was pushed to October 2022 and completed in November 2024, due to an unexpectedly lengthy permitting process. DCR acquired American Rescue Plan Act funding for construction, which began in February 2025 and paved the trail surface. DCR completed the trail segment in 2025, which included the restoration of selected historical railroad features. Additional roadway crossing improvements pushed the official opening to July 2026.

==== Litigation ====
From 2017 to 2022, many lawsuits and petitions were filed by the Town of Sudbury and various abutters alleging the overlapping and jointly permitted construction suffered from varied legal defects, including allegations that the MBTA-DCR trail easement was unlawful and void. However, in every ruling, all judges determined all plaintiffs could not succeed with any claim. In 2022 and 2023, abutters sued the MBTA in Massachusetts Land Court twice alleging property rights over the MBTA's Central Mass Branch property in furtherance of such allegations, but withdrew both cases before a judicial ruling. In 2024, Hudson Town Meeting voters rejected four citizen petitions to sell or lease the MBTA's Central Mass Branch property. The Hudson Finance Committee stated this was an attempt to bring the town into "unnecessary and costly" conflict with the MBTA regarding the ownership of the parcel. While the Towns of Sudbury and Hudson initially opposed construction of the trail at least as jointly permitted with the power reliability project, by 2025 both town governments had officially endorsed the Sudbury-Hudson trail, and lobbied for the completion of the entire MCRT.

=== Assabet River Rail Trail sharing ===
In Hudson, a 0.75-mile (1.21 km) section of the MCRT—Wayside is shared with the Assabet River Rail Trail along the former Marlborough Branch of the Fitchburg Railroad. Like this trail section, the predecessor railroads also shared this ROW, as some B&M Central Mass passenger trains were run via the Marlborough Branch starting in 1902. This was reduced to Hudson station in 1958, and while subsidized by the MBTA starting in 1964, the final passenger train on the Marlborough Branch ran in 1965. The MBTA's 1976/1977 purchase/acquisition of various ROWs included the Marlborough Branch along with the Central Mass Branch. B&M ran the final freight train to Hudson on the Marlborough Branch in 1980.
