= Assabet River Rail Trail =

Partially-completed rail trail in Middlesex County, Massachusetts, United States

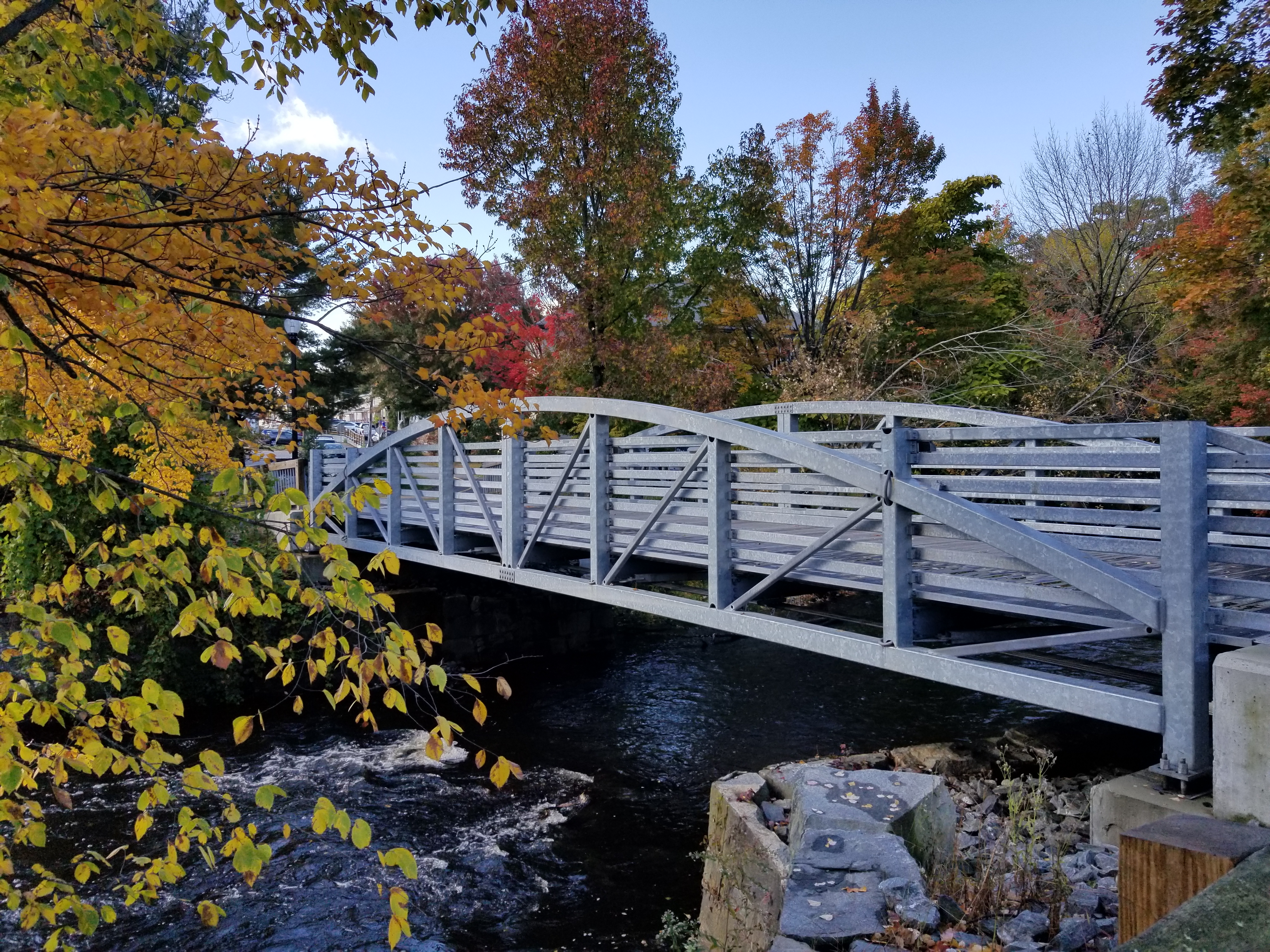
- Bridge completed in 2017 on Assabet River Rail Trail in Maynard
- Green: Asphalt Paved; Light Green: Dirt Road
- Length: 10.4 miles (16.7 km), 12.5 miles (20.1 km) when complete
- Location: Marlborough, Hudson, Stow, Maynard, and Acton, Massachusetts
- Established: 2001
- Use: Hiking, bicycling, inline skating, wheelchairs
- Difficulty: Easy
- Season: All
- Surface: Paved, dirt road
- Right of way: Former Marlborough Branch of the Fitchburg Railroad
- Maintainer: Marlborough, Hudson, Stow, Maynard, Acton
Trail map

The Assabet River Rail Trail (ARRT) is a partially-completed multi-use rail trail running through the cities and towns of Marlborough, Hudson, Stow, Maynard, and Acton, Massachusetts, United States. It is a conversion of the abandoned Marlborough Branch of the Fitchburg Railroad. The right-of-way parallels the Assabet River in the trail's midsection. At the north end it veers north to the South Acton MBTA train station while the south end veers south to Marlborough. When fully completed, the end-to-end length will be 12.5 miles (20.1 km). As of June 2020, the southwest 5.1-mile (8.2 km) portion of the trail from Marlborough to Hudson and the northeast 3.4-mile (5.5 km) portion running from the South Acton MBTA station to the Maynard–Stow border are completed. A recreational easement exists for users on the 1.9-mile (3.1 km) dirt road portion of Track Road in Stow. A paving easement for Track Road was acquired by 2021, but this project has not begun. No current plans exist for completing the 2.1-mile (3.4 km) gap from Sudbury Road, Stow to Wilkins Street, Hudson.

== Status ==
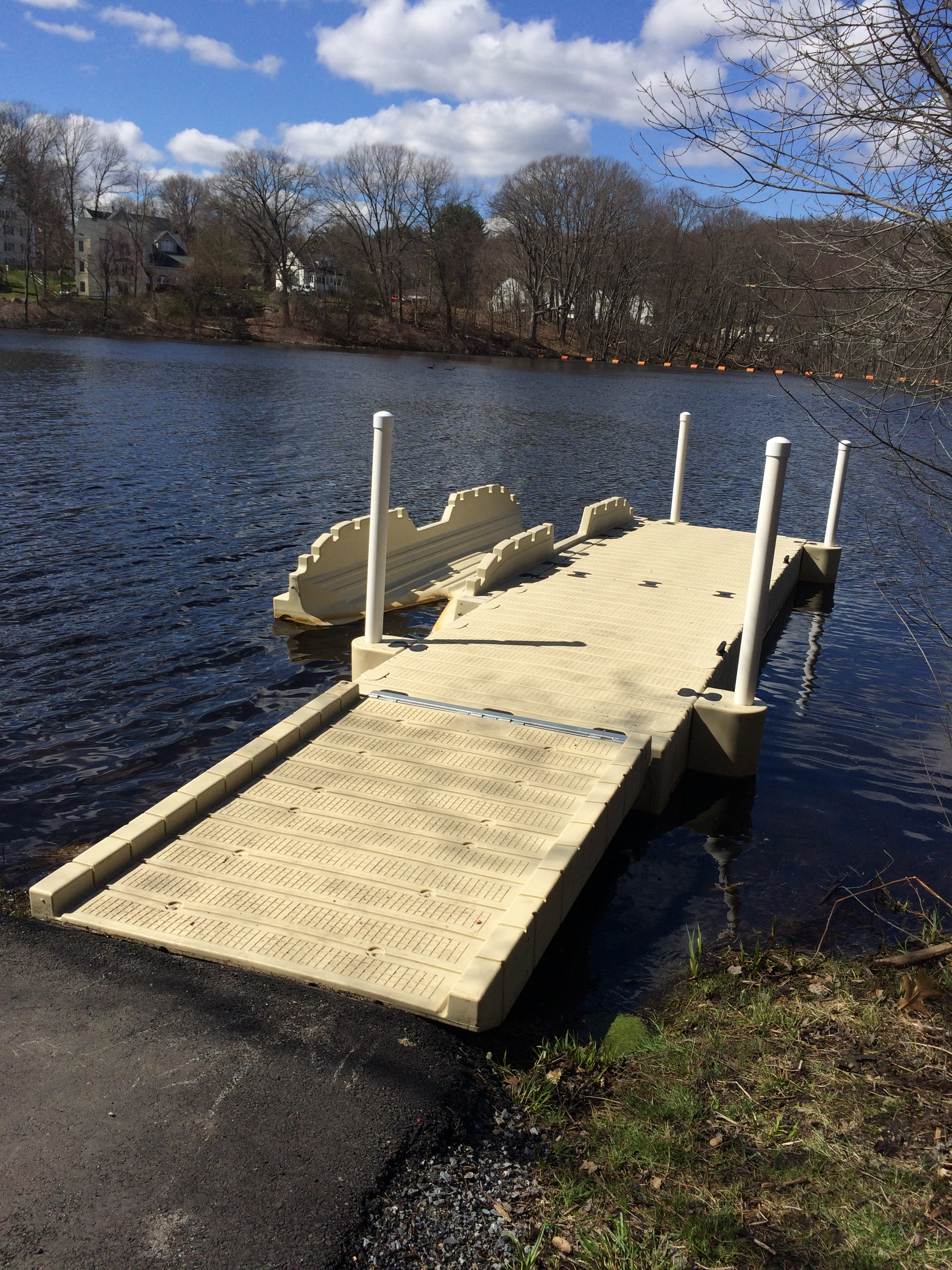
Kayak and canoe launch dock, Assabet River, Maynard, MA (USA)

Plans to convert the Marlborough Branch tracks into a rail trail date back to at least 1992. A January/February 1997 feasibility study conducted by the Commonwealth of Massachusetts supported the project's viability. The five municipalities through which the Marlborough Branch rails ran voted to approve the project in 1998.

Construction of the trail first began in 2000 in Marlborough and proceeded in increments. By 2001 the first 0.75 miles (1.21 km) segment in Marlborough was completed. Construction began in Hudson in 2003. By 2005 the south end of the trail, measuring 5.1 miles (8.2 km), was completed from Marlborough to a parking lot on Wilkins Street in northeast Hudson. Funding for much of the project was provided by the Boston Metropolitan Planning Organization, now known as the Metropolitan Area Planning Council (MAPC), and construction overseen by the Massachusetts Highway Department. In 2010, a MassHighway project to replace the MA-62 bridge over the Assabet River in Hudson was completed, which included safety improvements for the ARRT. In 2023, Hudson released a report announcing plans to share 0.75 miles (1.21 km) of the existing ARRT from Wilkins Street to Priest Street with the Mass Central Rail Trail—Wayside (MCRT—Wayside).

Construction of 3.4 miles (5.5 km) of the north end of the trail – from the South Acton train station running south to central Maynard and then southwest to White Pond Road at the Maynard–Stow border – began in 2016. The groundbreaking ceremony for the north end was held on July 21, 2016. The ribbon-cutting event celebrating the completion was held August 10, 2018.

Completion of the north end left a 4.0-mile (6.4 km) gap between the Marlborough–Hudson and Acton–Maynard portions of the trail. However, in 2009 a recreational easement for users on the 1.9-mile (3.1 km) east end of this gap, a dirt road known as Track Road, was established. The 2.1-mile (3.4 km) south end of the gap from Sudbury Road, Stow to Wilkins Street, Hudson has no bridges over the two crossings of the Assabet River, and some parts are on private property. Maps are available on the ARRT website.

There are four boat launches providing canoe and kayak access to the Assabet River on the trail: one in Hudson at Main Street Landing; one in Stow at Magazu Landing; and two in Maynard, at White Pond Road and Ice House Landing. A map of locations of these boat launches is available on the ARRT website.

In the fall of 2018, a volunteer organization and project called Trail of Flowers began planting thousands of blooming bulbs and perennial flowering plants, bushes, and trees along the trail. Plantings in 2018 were limited to Maynard, but expanded to Acton in 2019, Marlborough in 2020, and will add Hudson in the future. Donations cover the cost of the bulbs and perennials, and volunteers plant them.

=== Future connections ===
A separate April 1997 feasibility study conducted by the Massachusetts Central Transportation Planning Staff proposed a Central Massachusetts Rail Trail extending continuously from the town of Berlin to Alewife station and Minuteman Bikeway in Cambridge. The proposed trail included the Marlborough Branch right-of-way in Hudson, meaning the Central Massachusetts Rail Trail would connect to and overlap with the then-proposed Assabet River Rail Trail. By 2010, the Massachusetts Department of Conservation and Recreation signed a lease with the MBTA for trail development over 23 miles (37 km) of ROW from Berlin to Waltham. The project was renamed the Mass Central Rail Trail—Wayside (MCRT—Wayside). In October 2022, 7.6 miles (12.2 km) of the MCRT—Wayside in Sudbury and Hudson began construction, which created a connection to the ARRT at Wilkins Street. Construction completed in 2025. Additionally, in 2023 Hudson announced plans to share 0.75 miles (1.21 km) of the existing ARRT from Wilkins Street to Priest Street with the MCRT—Wayside. This is a cost saving measure as an alternative to new construction of the MCRT—Wayside over the nearby, former Central Mass Branch ROW. From Priest Street, a connection to the MCRT—Wayside in downtown and west Hudson is in design.

In 2021, an easement to pave the 1.9-mile (3.1 km) dirt road section of the ARRT on Track Road in Stow was negotiated, although this project does not address the 2.1-mile (3.4 km) gap from Sudbury Road, Stow to Wilkins Street, Hudson. In 2023, this project was in the design phase.

== History ==
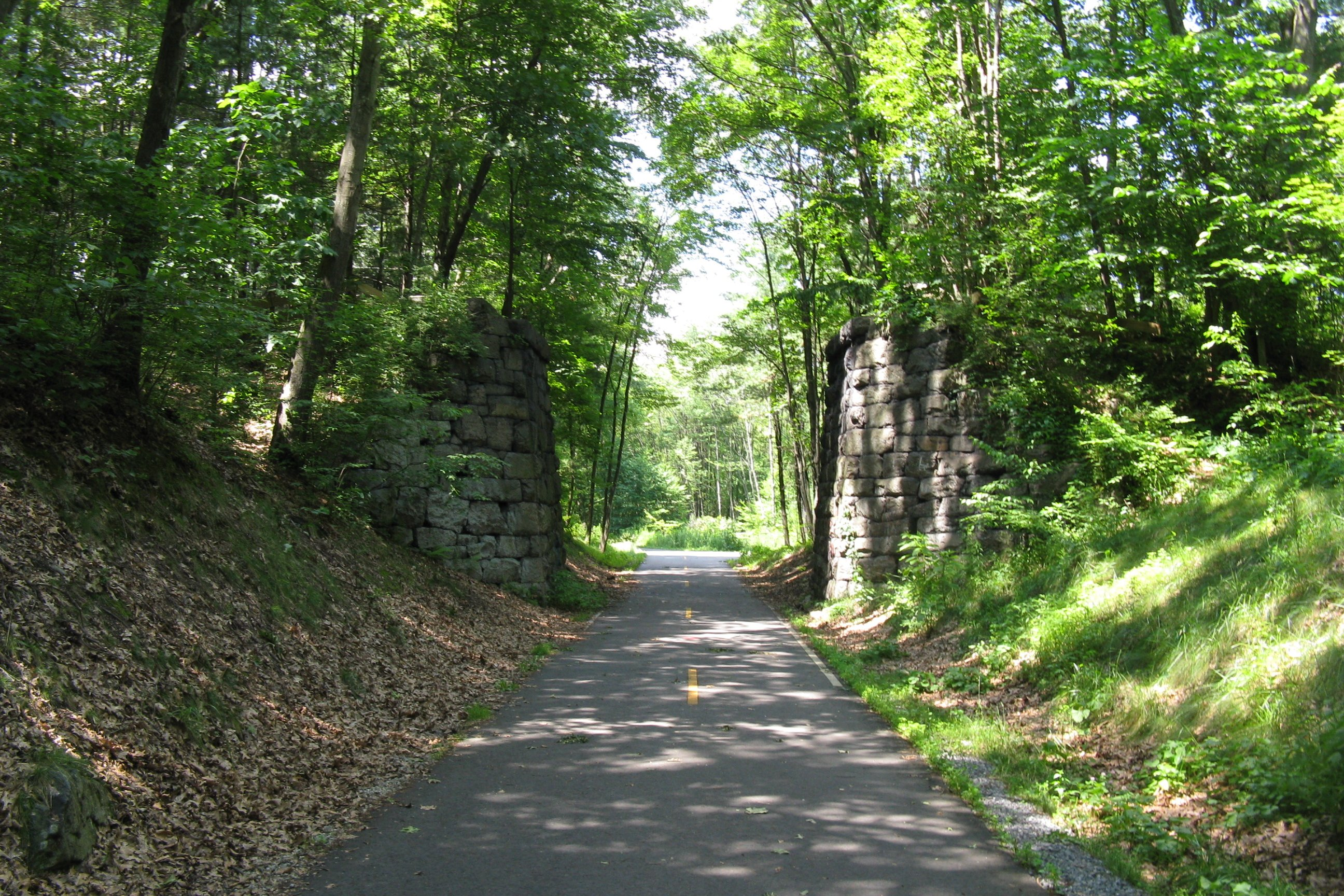
Assabet River Rail Trail south of Washington Street in Hudson; stone abutments are remnants of a former Boston & Maine Railroad bridge known as "Farmer's Bridge"

The Marlborough Branch railroad was progressively lengthened so that it reached from the Acton station to Maynard by 1849, extended through Stow to Hudson in 1850, and reached its Marlborough terminus in 1855. Passenger service was discontinued in the reverse fashion, such that Marlborough's service ended in 1930, Hudson and Stow in 1939, and finally Maynard in 1958. However the Boston and Maine Railroad, later subsidized by the MBTA, used the Marlborough Branch to provide passenger service to Hudson from 1958-1965 via the Central Mass Branch. The branch continued providing freight service until the final train to Hudson in 1980. The last remaining rails and railroad ties in Acton and Maynard were removed in 2014.

In 1851 transcendentalist Henry David Thoreau, who lived in Concord, wrote in his famous journal about a trek to Boon's Pond—today known as Lake Boon—which on the return included a walk along the railroad tracks now replaced by the trail.
