= Bruce Freeman Rail Trail =

Rail trail in Massachusetts, United States

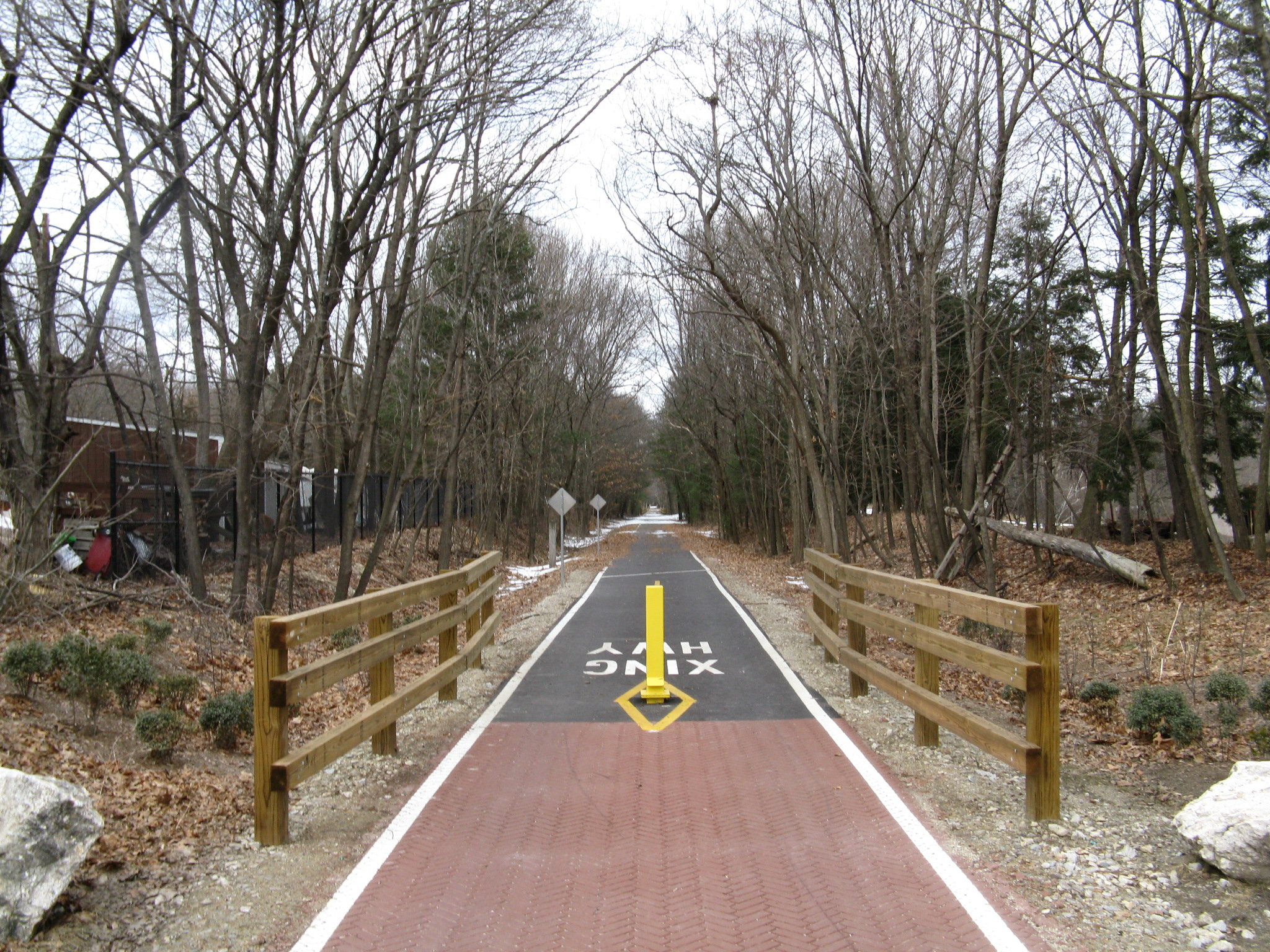
- Bruce Freeman Rail Trail in South Chelmsford
- Length: 19.98 miles (32.15 km) open, just under 25 miles (40 km) when complete
- Began construction: 2009
- Use: Hiking, bicycling, inline skating, cross-country skiing
- Difficulty: Easy
- Season: Year-round
- Surface: Paved
- Right of way: Former Framingham and Lowell Railroad
- Maintainer: Lowell, Chelmsford, Westford, Carlisle, Acton, Concord, Sudbury, Massachusetts Department of Transportation, Friends of the Bruce Freeman Rail Trail
- Website: https://brucefreemanrailtrail.org/

Bruce Freeman Rail Trail map
- Green: Complete; Purple: In Design

The Bruce Freeman Rail Trail (BFRT) is a partly completed rail trail in Massachusetts. The path is a 10-foot-wide (3.0 m) paved multi-use trail, available for walking, running, biking, rollerblading, and other non-motorized uses. It follows the right-of-way of the abandoned Framingham and Lowell Line of the New York, New Haven and Hartford Railroad. The constructed route connects with the Bay Circuit Trail, and Phase 2D connects with the Mass Central Rail Trail—Wayside. The total planned length of the trail—which will eventually run from Lowell to Framingham—is just under 25 miles (40 km).

== Completed sections ==
The trail was divided into several phases of construction, and today 19.98 miles (32.15 km) are open:

- Phase 1: 6.8 miles (10.9 km) in Lowell, Chelmsford, and Westford (ending at Route 225). This segment opened on August 29, 2009. At the Lowell end, it begins at the Cross Point Towers, with a parking lot and a corrugated metal tunnel under Route 3.
  - Connector Trail northern extension (under construction): In 2019, MassTrails awarded $180,000 for construction of a short connecting trail under the Lowell Connector. In May 2024, this segment was under construction and was expected to be completed in summer 2024. It extends the trail from Cross Point Towers to the Target shopping plaza on Plain Street.
  - Future northern extension: Trail advocates want a further extension, which would connect the BFRT to the Concord River Greenway to the east. The first phase of the CRG was completed in 2022; in 2024, the City of Lowell was negotiating with property owners for an expansion.
- Phase 2A: 4.9 miles (7.9 km) through Westford, Carlisle, and Acton (Route 225) to just north of Route 2). Construction began in June 2015; the segment opened on April 3, 2018.
- Phase 2B: 0.88 miles (1.42 km) in Acton and Concord, opened in May 2023, with a bridge spanning Massachusetts Route 2.
- Phase 2C: 2.5 miles (4.0 km) from Commonwealth Avenue to Powder Mill Road in Concord, with a short jog through West Concord station, where bikes must be walked. Construction began in July 2017; this segment cost $7.2 million and opened on September 27, 2019.
- Phase 2D: 4.9 miles (7.9 km) from Powder Mill Road in Concord to the Mass Central Rail Trail—Wayside in Sudbury. Sudbury began planning this phase no later than 2004. Residents continually advocated it, secured at least Town Meeting votes in favor of construction, and supported a ballot-box vote in favor. Construction began in January 2023, and the project was opened to public use "at your own risk" in June 2025. The trail was officially opened and maintenance responsibility was transferred to Sudbury in July 2026. Due to unresolved issues regarding the redesign of a parking lot ramp to accessible standards, and control and removal of invasive species, the expected official ribbon cutting event was delayed and expected later in 2026.
Bruce Freeman Rail Trail photos

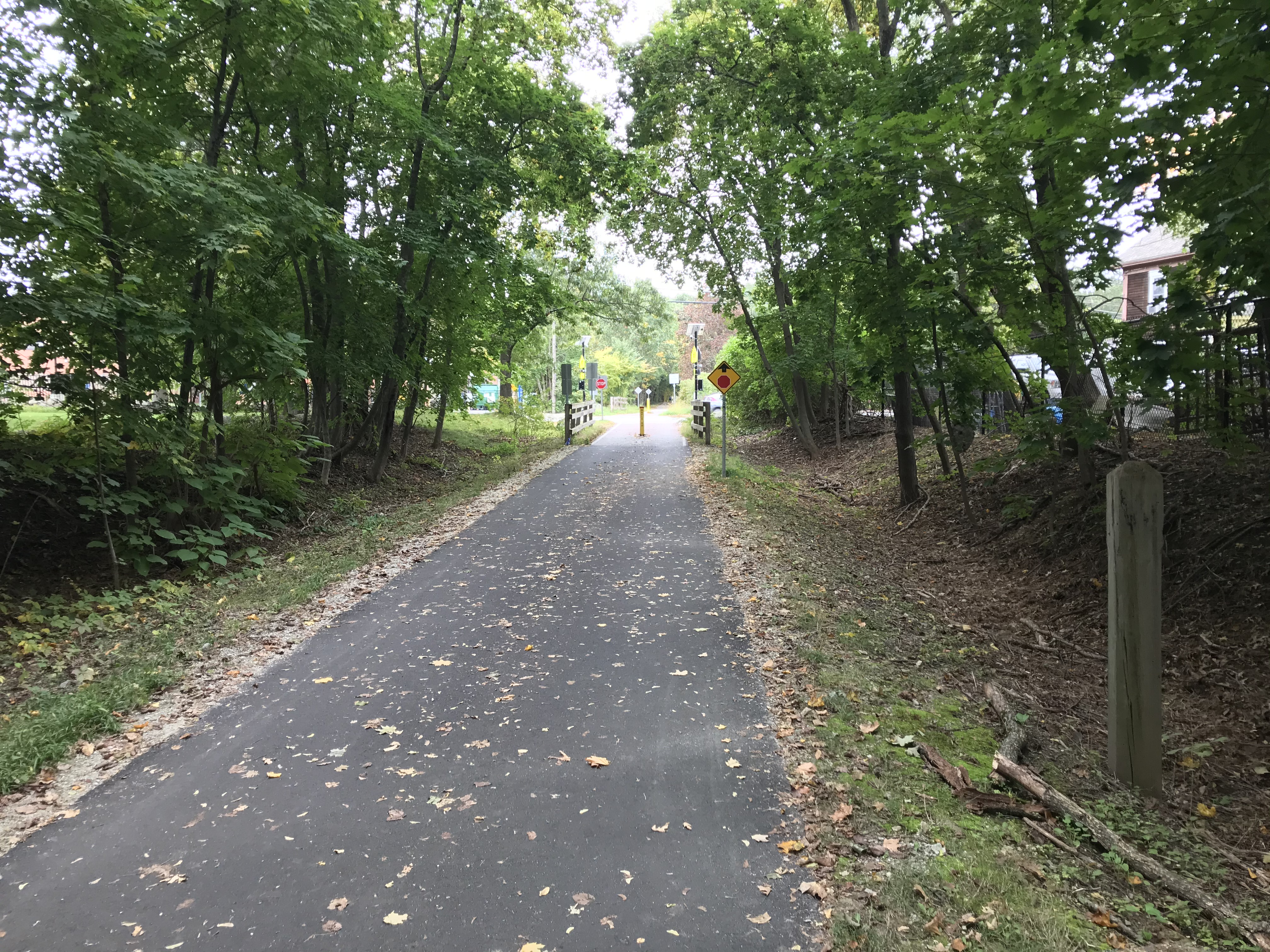
Approaching Maple Road, Chelmsford

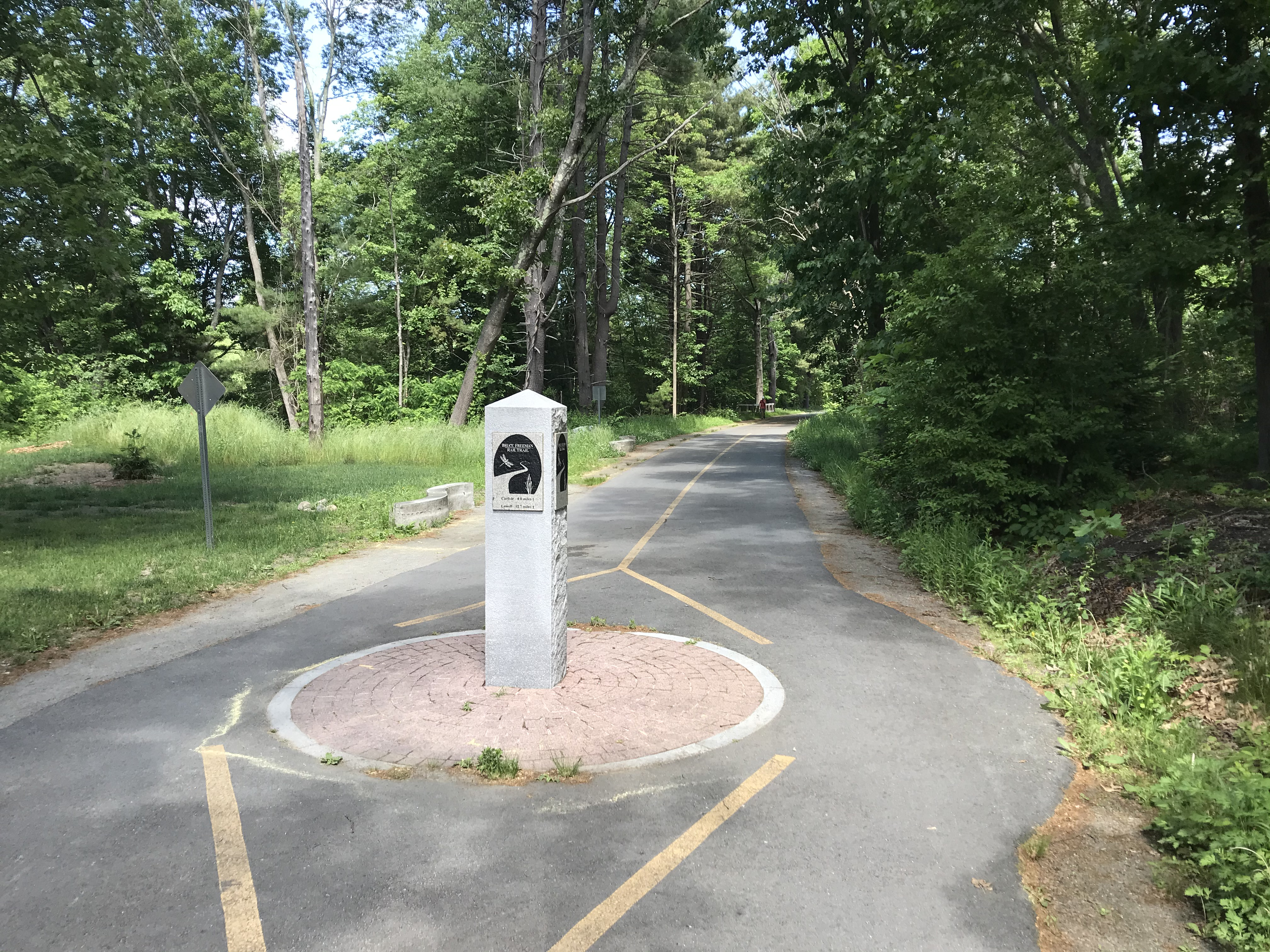
Mile marker, Acton

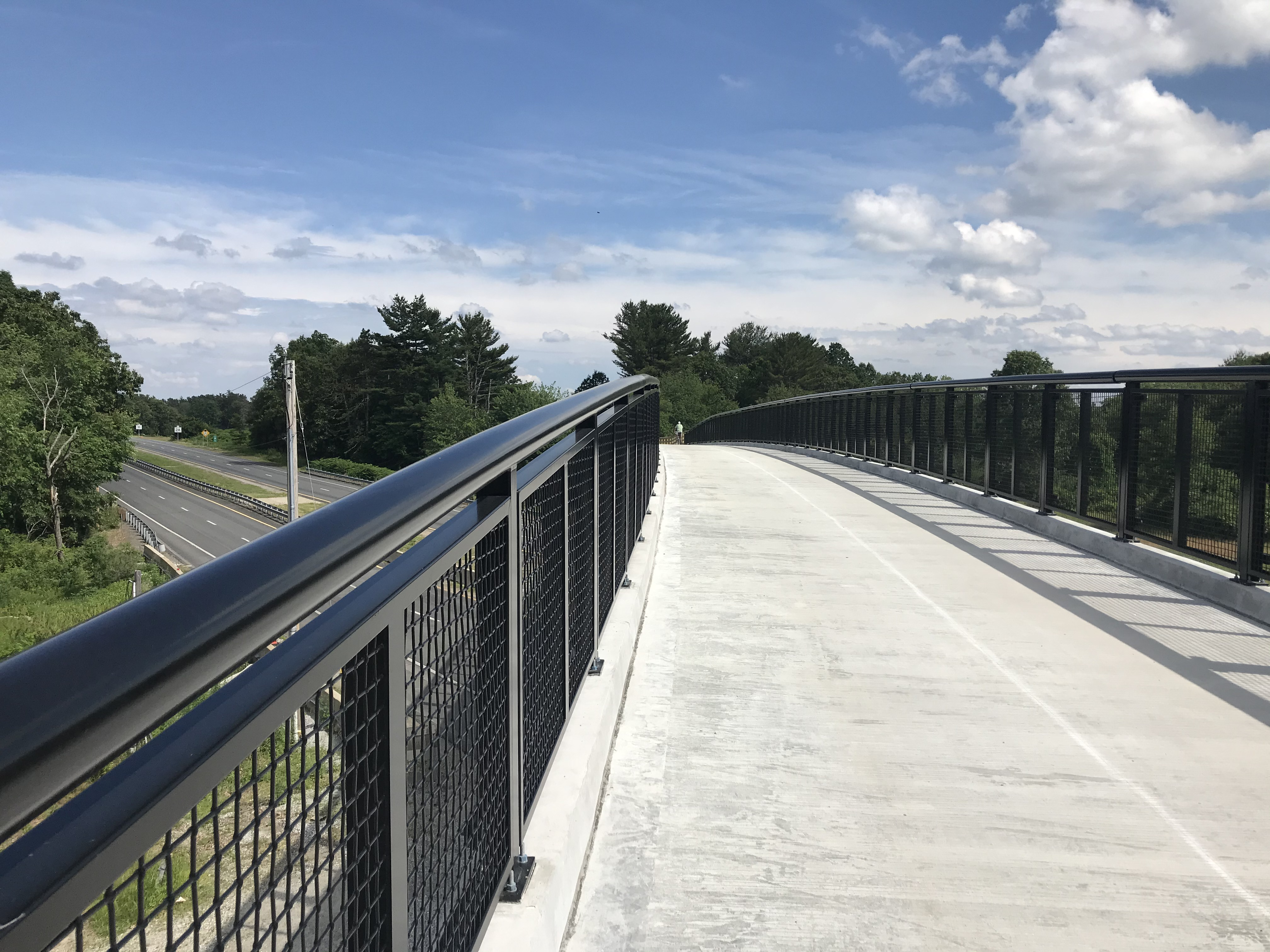
Bridge over Route 2, Concord

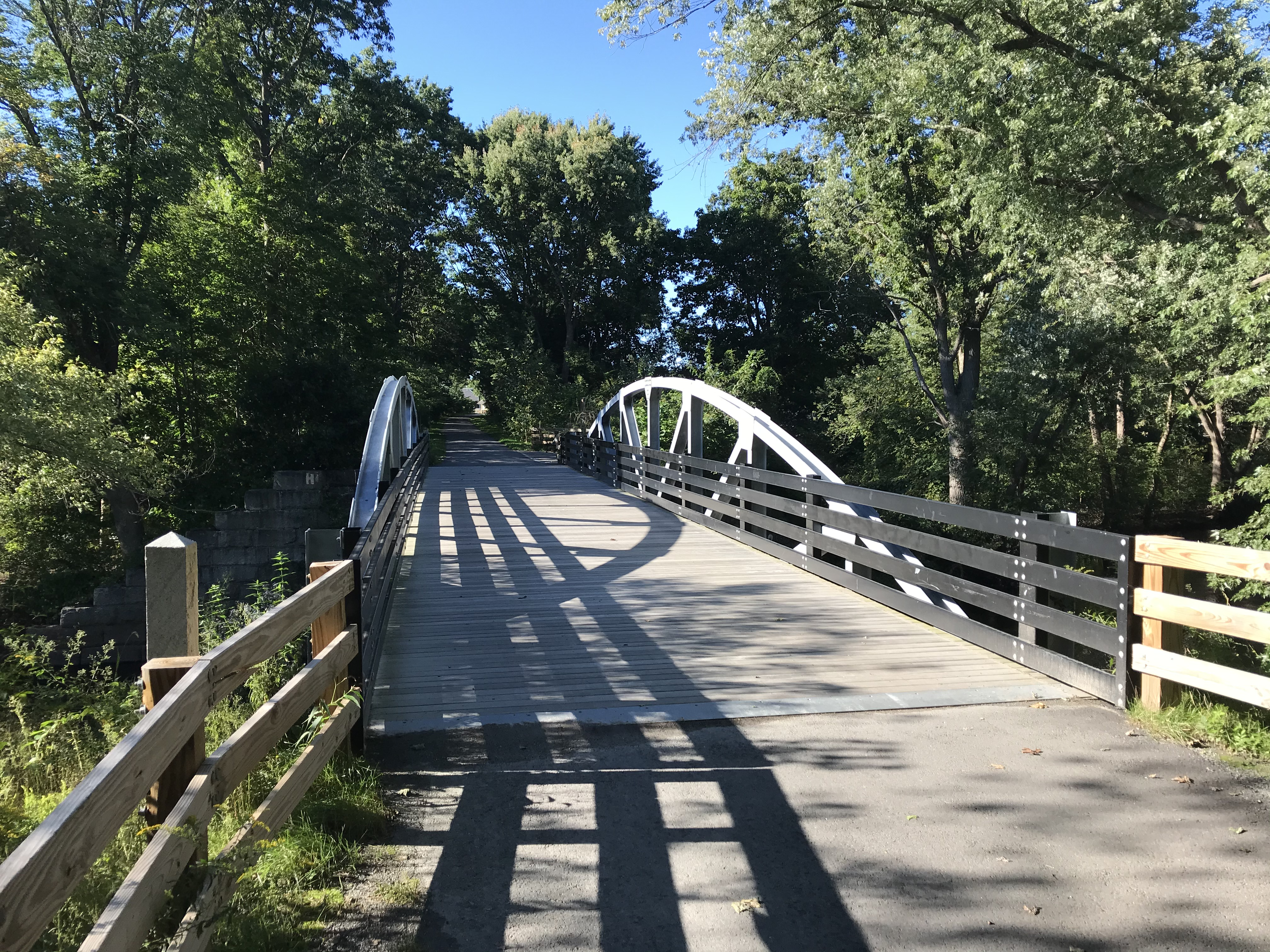
Bridge over the Assabet River, Concord

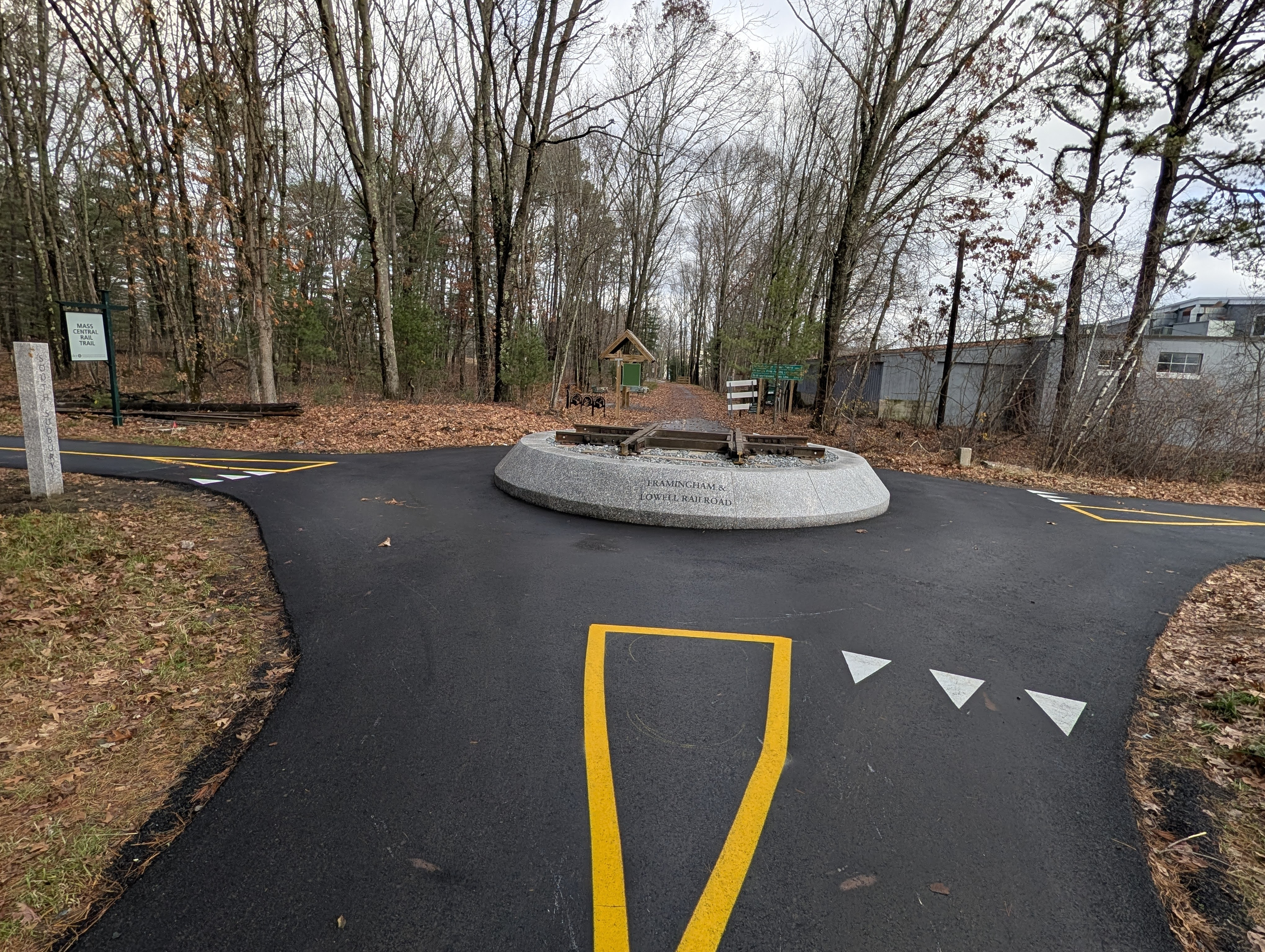
Mass Central Rail Trail—Wayside and Bruce Freeman Rail Trail roundabout, Sudbury

== In progress sections ==
A further 4.6 miles (7.4 km) of the trail are in design as Phase 3, from the Mass Central Rail Trail—Wayside in Sudbury to Pleasant Street in Framingham, and planned to be built in 3 sections.

- 1.4 miles (2.3 km) from the Mass Central Rail Trail—Wayside, Sudbury to Eaton Road W, Framingham. In July 2020, MassTrails awarded Sudbury $300,000 to purchase the right-of-way from South Sudbury to the Framingham line, and Sudbury became the railbanking trail sponsor for this section in December 2020. In 2022, Sudbury was awarded $240,000 in MassTrails grants for this design. In 2023, Sudbury was awarded $192,000 in MassTrails grants to continue the design of this Phase 3 segment. The 25% design is underway, and partial construction funding is on the draft Boston Region Metropolitan Planning Organization's Transportation Improvement Program for fiscal year 2029. In 2024, a MassTrails grant for final design of this section was awarded.

In 2022, Framingham was awarded a $408,000 grant for conceptual design of the trail in Framingham. In December 2022, Framingham signed a purchase-and-sale agreement with CSX to purchase the right-of-way in Framingham. Framingham became the railbanking trail sponsor for both Framingham sections in December 2023.

- 1.4 miles (2.3 km) from Eaton Road W, Framingham to Frost Street, Framingham. Also known as Framingham Phase 1, the 10% conceptual design is underway, the 25% design is targeted for summer 2025, and construction is estimated to start as early as 2028. In 2024, a MassTrails grant for design and permitting in Framingham was awarded.
- 1.8 miles (2.9 km) from Frost Street, Framingham to Pleasant Street, Framingham, including the rehabilitation of two bridges over Grove Street and I-90. Also known as Framingham Phase 2, it is hoped construction will start within a year of Framingham Phase 1.

== Maintenance ==
The completed sections of trail are owned by the Massachusetts Department of Transportation (MassDOT). MassDOT built the trail, and takes care of serious issues. The towns have primary responsibility for maintaining the rail trail, and the 501(c)(3) nonprofit group Friends of the Bruce Freeman Rail Trail assists the towns with maintenance.

== Proposed connections ==
The Upper Charles Trail Extension was proposed in 2022 by the Wellesley-based Solomon Foundation. It would connect the Bruce Freeman Rail Trail's southern terminus in Framingham with the existing Upper Charles River Rail Trail (passing through Sherborn, Holliston, Milford, and Hopkinton), as well as the Bay Circuit Trail.

A long term vision for the Concord River Greenway Park in progress is to connect to the Bruce Freeman Rail Trail in Lowell.

The proposed Boston-Worcester Air Line Trail (BWALT) would connect to the Bruce Freeman Rail Trail in Framingham.

== History ==
By the 1980s, the former Framingham and Lowell Railroad from Lowell to South Sudbury, last operated by Penn Central, had been abandoned. Ownership of the ROW had passed to the Commonwealth of Massachusetts. Bruce Freeman, a state representative from Chelmsford, advocated converting the ROW to the Lowell-Sudbury Rail Trail in 1985 until his death in 1986. Freeman was inspired by the Cape Cod Rail Trail, and the Lowell–Sudbury Rail Trail was modeled on it. In 1987, a Massachusetts bill was proposed to create the trail and name it in honor of Bruce Freeman, which was signed into law in 1989. This original 19.98-mile (32.15 km) trail was constructed in five phases from 2009 to 2025.

An additional 4.6 miles (7.4 km) of the Framingham and Lowell Railroad line from South Sudbury to Framingham Center remained active; the final railroad owner became CSX in 1999. However, a freight train derailment in South Sudbury in 2000 caused CSX to begin abandonment proceedings. Sudbury and Framingham entered railbanking negotiations with CSX in 2001 to extend the Bruce Freeman Rail Trail. Sudbury successfully railbanked the CSX corridor in 2020, and Framingham was successful in 2023. Trail design in South Sudbury and Framingham is ongoing.
