= Silver Hill Historic District (Weston, Massachusetts) =

Historic district in Massachusetts, United States

- U.S. National Register of Historic Places
- U.S. Historic district
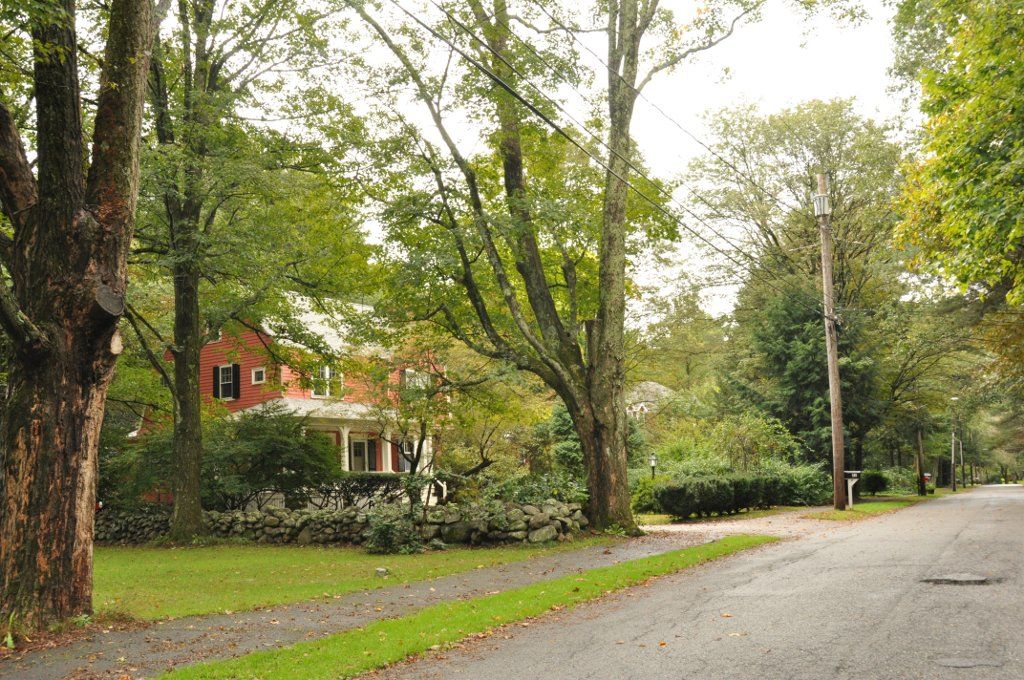
- Silver Hill Road

- Location within Massachusetts Location within the United States
- Location: Silver Hill and Westland Rds., Merriam St., Weston, Massachusetts
- Coordinates: 42°23′34″N 71°18′18″W
- Area: 54 acres (22 ha)
- Built: 1905
- Architect: Strout, George; Worcester, J.R.
- Architectural style: Italianate, Queen Anne
- NRHP reference No.: 04000902
- Added to NRHP: August 25, 2004

The Silver Hill Historic District encompasses the first major residential subdivision of Weston, Massachusetts. It includes 79 buildings on Silver Hill and Westland Roads, and Merriam Street. The area of Silver Hill and Westland Roads was formally laid out in 1905, while Merriam Street is a very old country road which had seen some development in the 1890s. The houses in the district are predominantly Colonial Revival and Queen Anne in their styling, a relative rarity in Weston although common in other Boston suburbs. The district was added to the National Register of Historic Places in 2004.

== Description and history ==
The Silver Hill neighborhood is located in northern Weston, south of North Street (Massachusetts Route 117) and the Silver Hill stop of the MBTA's Fitchburg Line commuter rail. The district extends along Merriam Street, which crosses the railroad line on an old wooden bridge, south to Westland Road. Just south of the railroad crossing, Silver Hill Road branches west, then curves south to flank the eponymous hill, reaching its end at Westland Road. The neighborhood is extended further west on Westland Road, an area which is excluded from the historic district due to a loss of historical integrity in many of its houses. The district is complete residential in character, occupying about 54 acres (22 ha) with 41 historically significant houses, as well as a number of period barns and garages.

Merriam Street is a road that dates to relatively early in the area's settlement history, but its northern end remained farmland until the 1890s. The Silver Hill railroad stop was opened in 1875, and helped spur residential development. The oldest house in the district, 227 Merriam Street, was built in 1892 for a worker at the Hook & Hastings Pipe Organ Company, whose plant was one stop east on the rail line. Land along Merriam Street was subdivided and built first, and in 1905 the Weston Land Company was formed by local owners and investors to plat and develop Silver Hill and Westland Roads. Although land was divided into lots of 30,000 square feet (2,800 m^{2}), many were sold as double lots, resulting in a relatively spacious development. Most of the houses built are either Queen Anne or Colonial Revival in character, and most were built by 1920.

== See also ==
- National Register of Historic Places listings in Weston, Massachusetts
