= Walden Street Cattle Pass =

- U.S. National Register of Historic Places
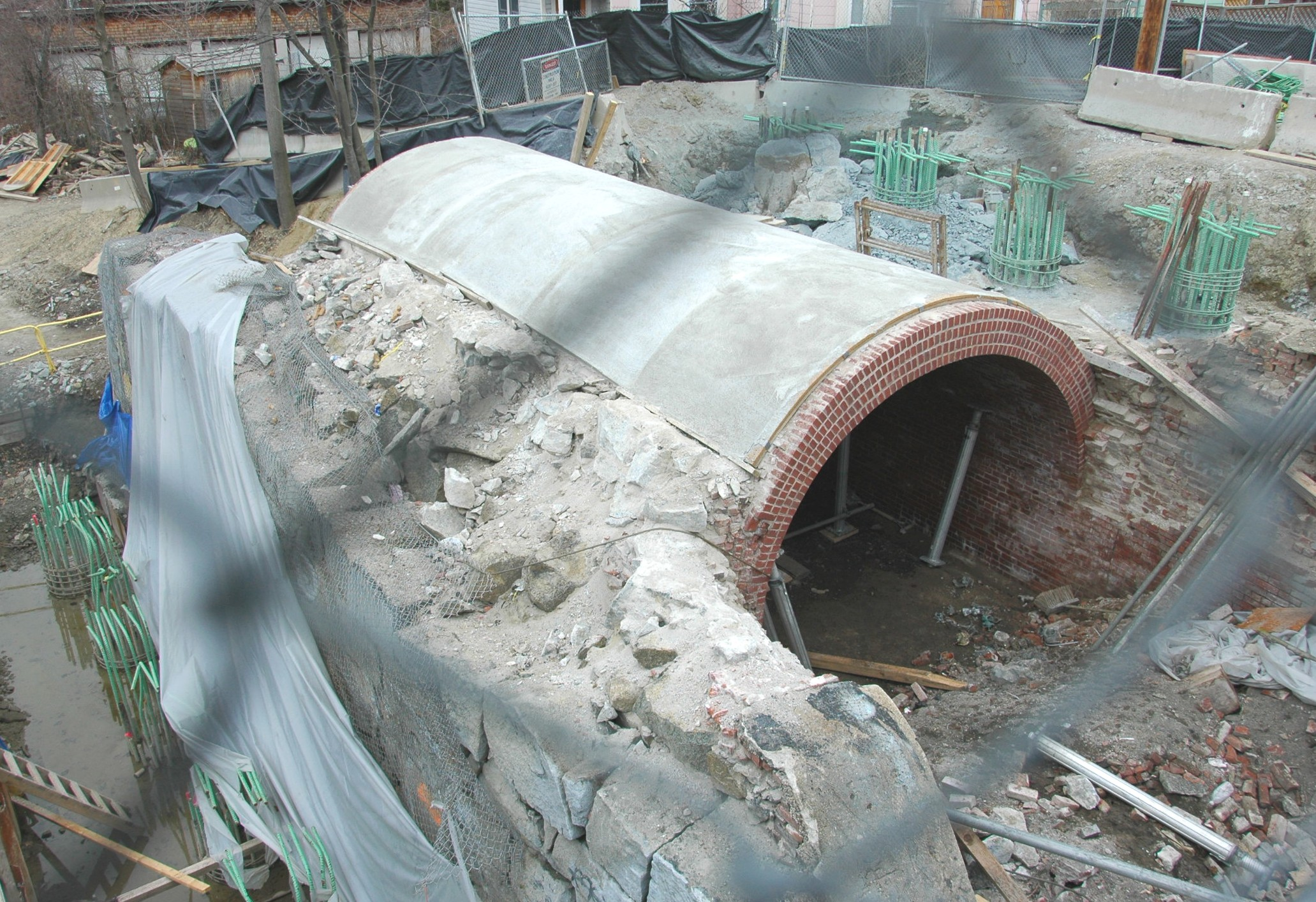
- Usually nearly concealed under the Walden Street Bridge, the tunnel is seen here exposed during 2007-08 bridge reconstruction work.

- Location within Massachusetts Location within the United States
- Location: Cambridge, Massachusetts
- Coordinates: 42°23′21.9″N 71°7′28.8″W
- Built: 1857
- MPS: Cambridge MRA
- NRHP reference No.: 94000554
- Added to NRHP: June 3, 1994

The Walden Street Cattle Pass, also referred to as the cow path, is a historic site adjacent to the MBTA Commuter Rail Fitchburg Line right-of-way, under the Walden Street Bridge in Cambridge, Massachusetts. It was added to the National Register of Historic Places in 1994.

The site, a tunnel for moving cattle between the railroad and the nearby stockyards of the 19th century, was built in 1857. The cattle yards were closed in 1868 or "about 1871", but the cattle trade continued; "until the 1920s, cows were unloaded here and driven down Massachusetts Avenue, through Harvard Square, and across the river to the Brighton Abattoir".

Restoration (re-pointing) of the tunnel's brickwork was carried out during the 2007–08 replacement of the second-generation bridge dating from 1914. The third-generation bridge opened for traffic in December 2008. The Cambridge City Council discussed creation of a vantage point for viewing the tunnel, ca. 2008, but no action was taken.

== Gallery ==
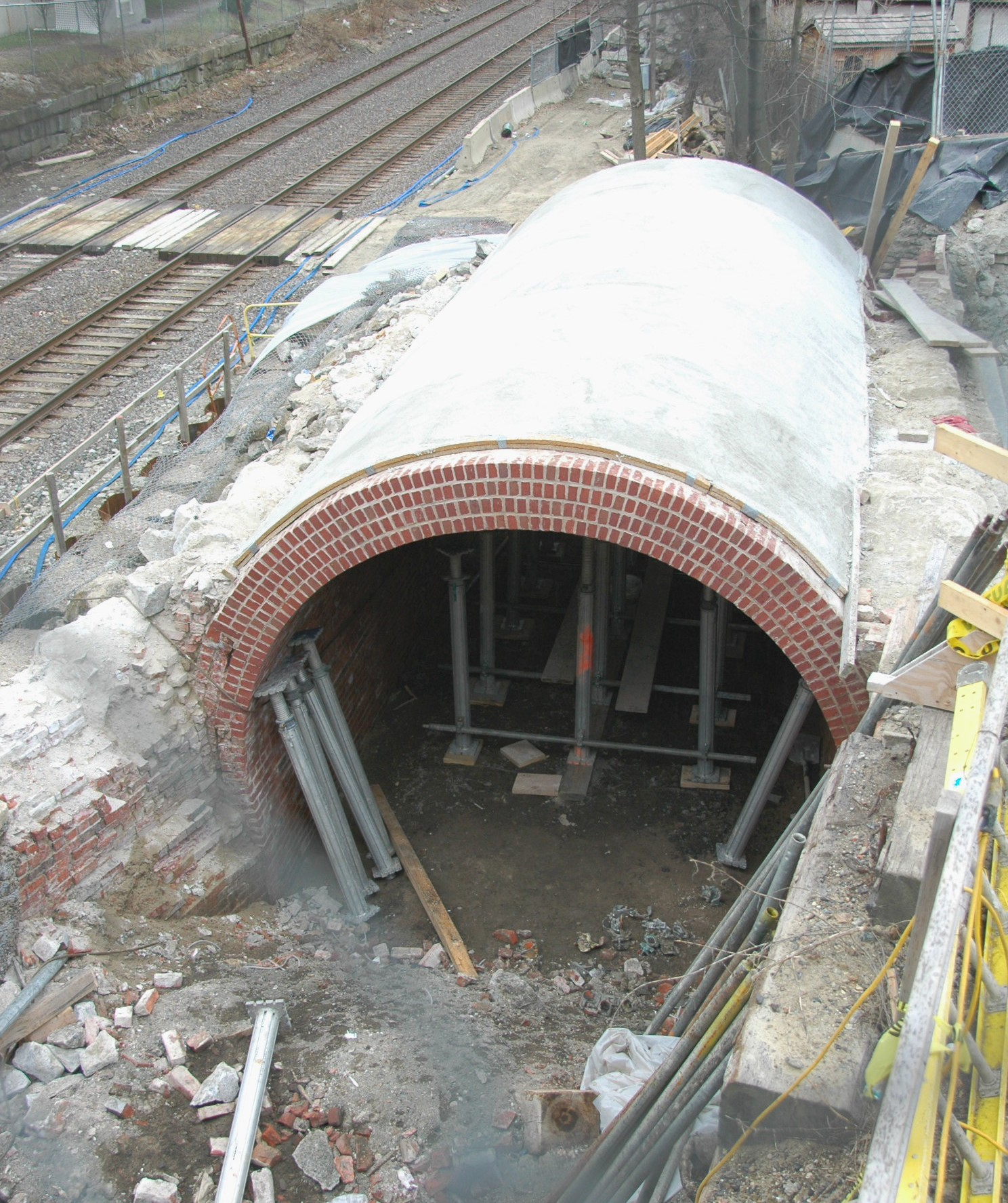
Another view of the Cattle Pass during restoration

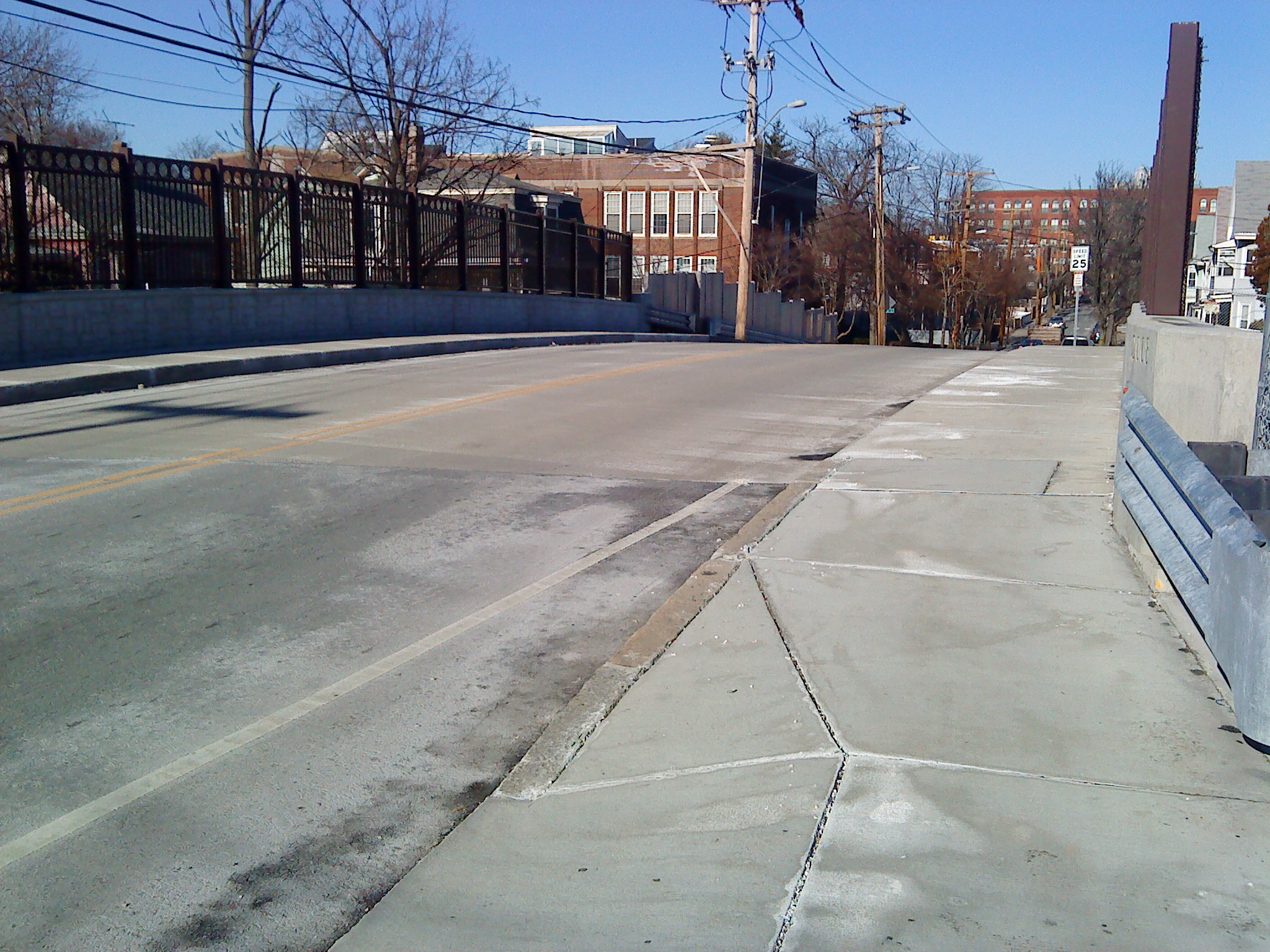
The rebuilt bridge, looking north

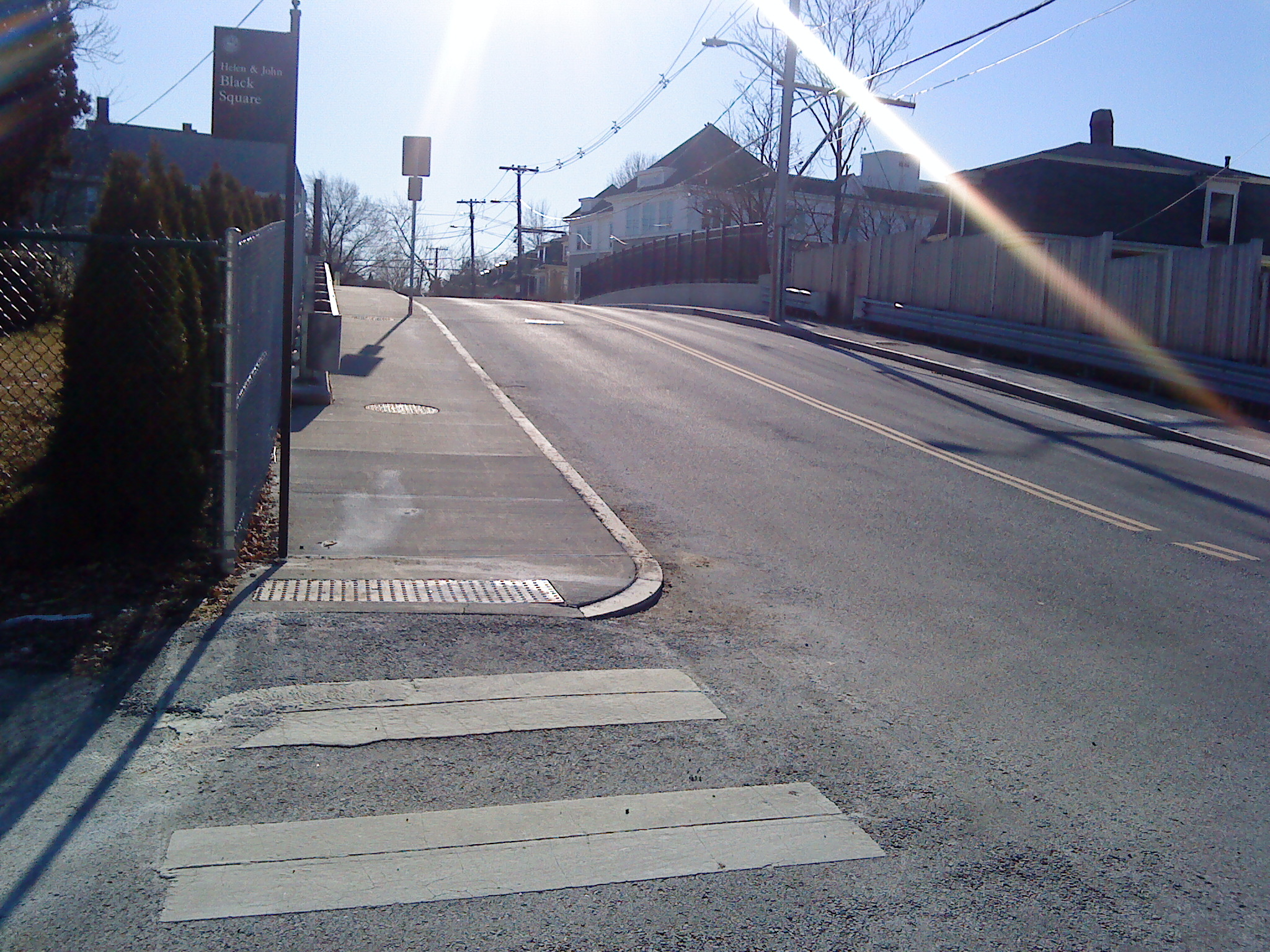
The rebuilt bridge, looking south
