= Hastings station (MBTA) =

Former railway station in Weston, Massachusetts, US

Hastings
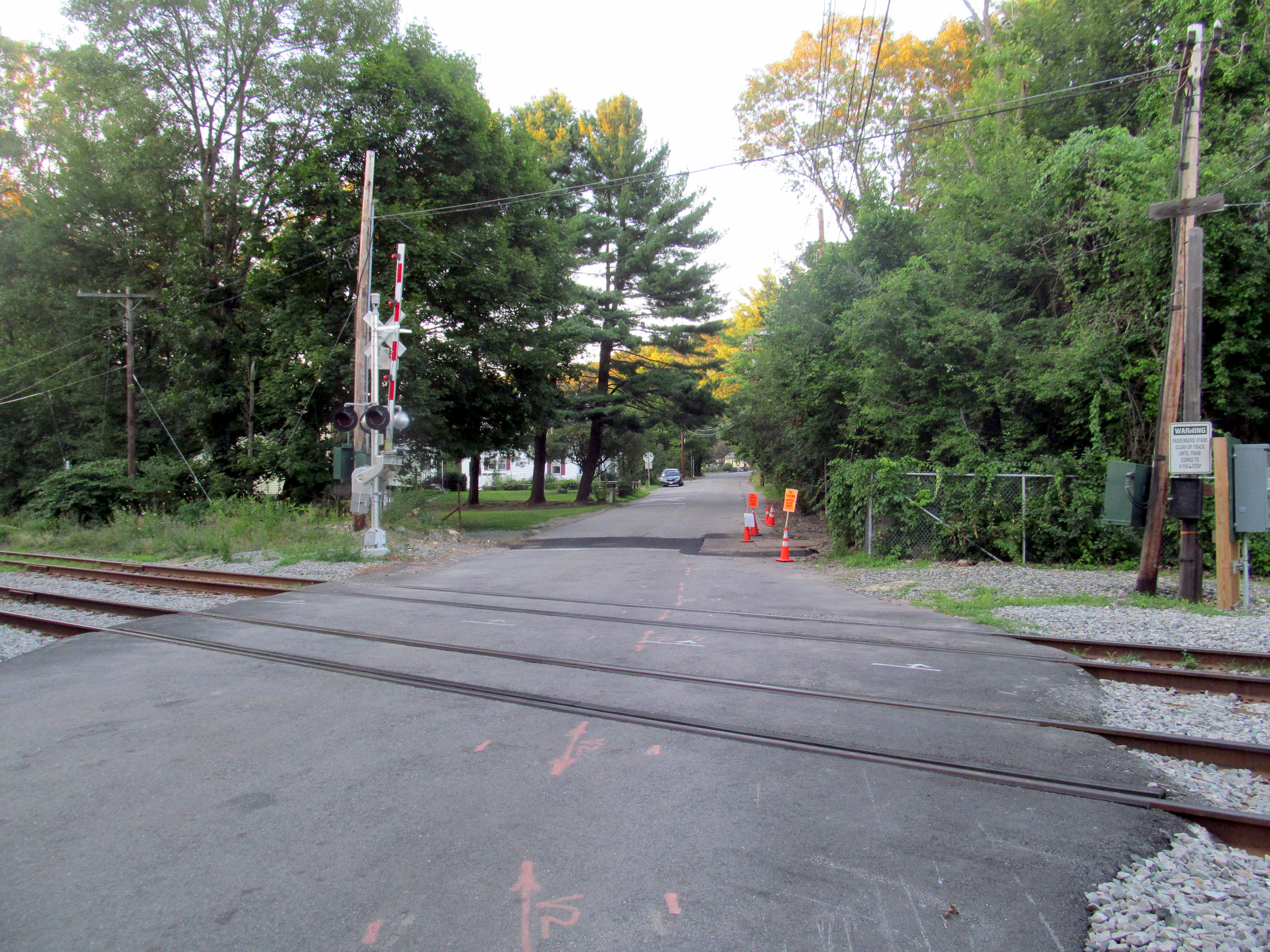
- The level crossing (boarding area) at Hastings station in 2015

General information
- Location: 105 Viles Street; Weston, Massachusetts
- Coordinates: 42.385814°N 71.289154°W
- Line: Fitchburg Route
- Platforms: None
- Tracks: 2

Construction
- Accessible: No

Other information
- Fare zone: 3

History
- Opened: 1890s
- Closed: December 14, 2020

Passengers
- 2018: 18 daily boardings

Former services
Preceding station	MBTA	Following station
Silver Hill toward Wachusett	Fitchburg Line	Kendal Green toward North Station
Location

Hastings station was an MBTA Commuter Rail Fitchburg Line station in Weston, Massachusetts. The station had a small parking area but no platforms; passengers boarded trains from the Viles Street grade crossing. It was originally opened in the 1890s to serve the adjacent Hook & Hastings organ factory. The factory closed in 1935, but the station remained open with limited service. It was temporarily closed by the Massachusetts Bay Transportation Authority (MBTA) in December 2020 due to its low ridership and lack of accessibility; indefinite closure became effective in April 2021.

== Station design ==
Hastings station was located at the Viles Street grade crossing in Weston, about 700 feet (210 m) away from North Avenue (Route 117). Unlike other MBTA Commuter Rail stations, Hastings did not have platforms; passengers boarded and alighted trains on the Viles Street grade crossing. The station was not accessible. It was one of just three commuter rail stations on the system, along with Plimptonville and Lincoln, without any shelter available for passengers. A dirt parking lot on the south side of the tracks provided space for just six to seven vehicles.

== History ==
=== Early history ===
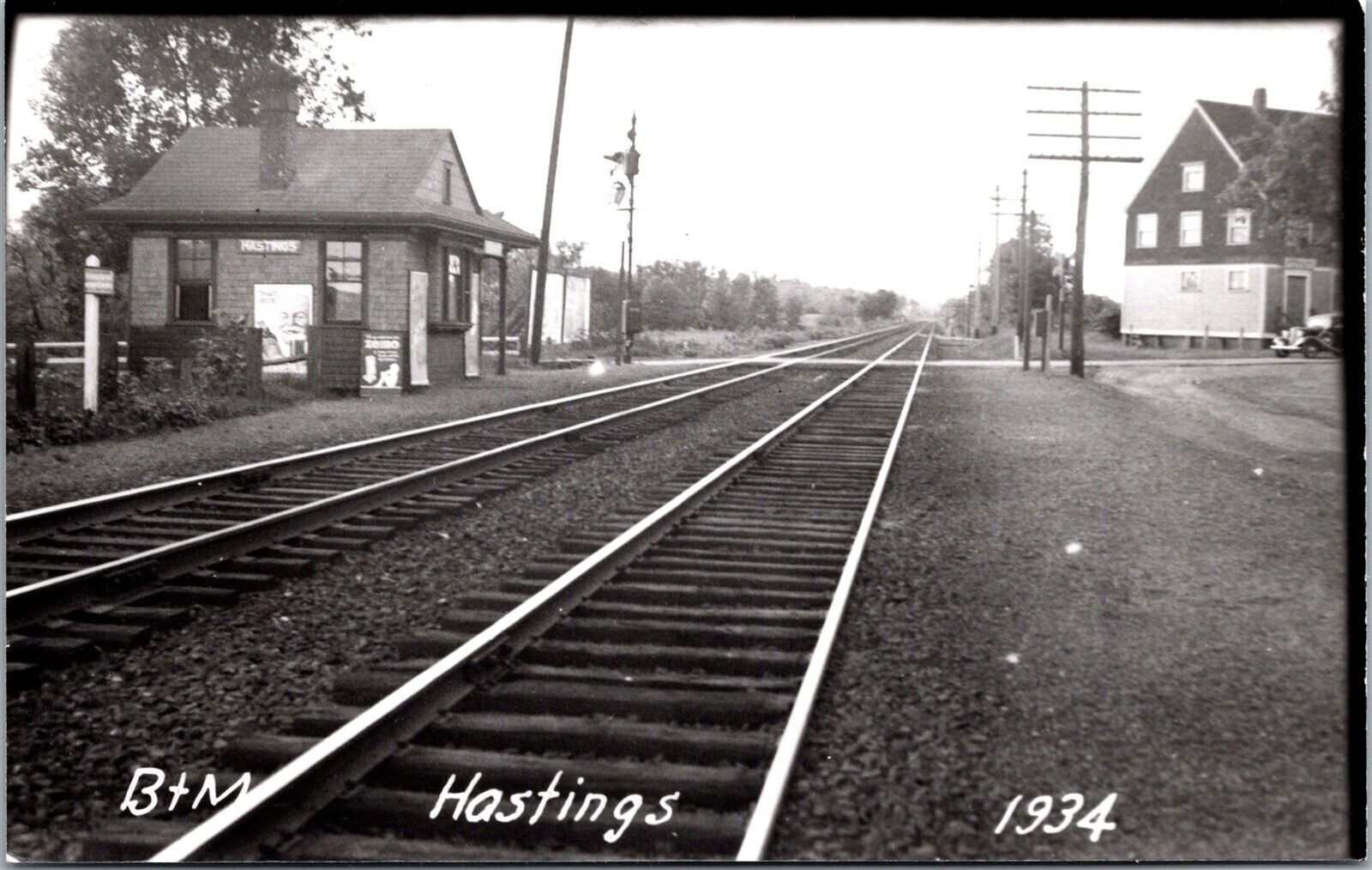
Hastings station in 1934

The Fitchburg Railroad opened along the Stony Brook valley through Weston on June 17, 1844, with stops at Weston (later renamed Kendal Green) and Silver Hill. In 1889, Hook & Hastings opened its new organ factory on the north side of the tracks east of Viles Street, near the home of owner Frank Hastings. Although Hastings built nearby housing for factory workers, a flag stop at Viles Street was opened in the early 1890s for workers commuting from Boston and visitors to the factory. The stop, which had a small station building across the tracks from the factory, was soon named for Hastings.

The Fitchburg Railroad was acquired by the Boston and Maine Railroad (B&M) in 1900. The factory closed in 1935 and was demolished in 1936. Hastings remained as a limited-service stop to serve the nearby residents; by 1946, it was served by five inbound and four outbound trains on weekdays, with several additional Saturday stops but no Sunday service. The station building was demolished by 1977.

=== MBTA era ===
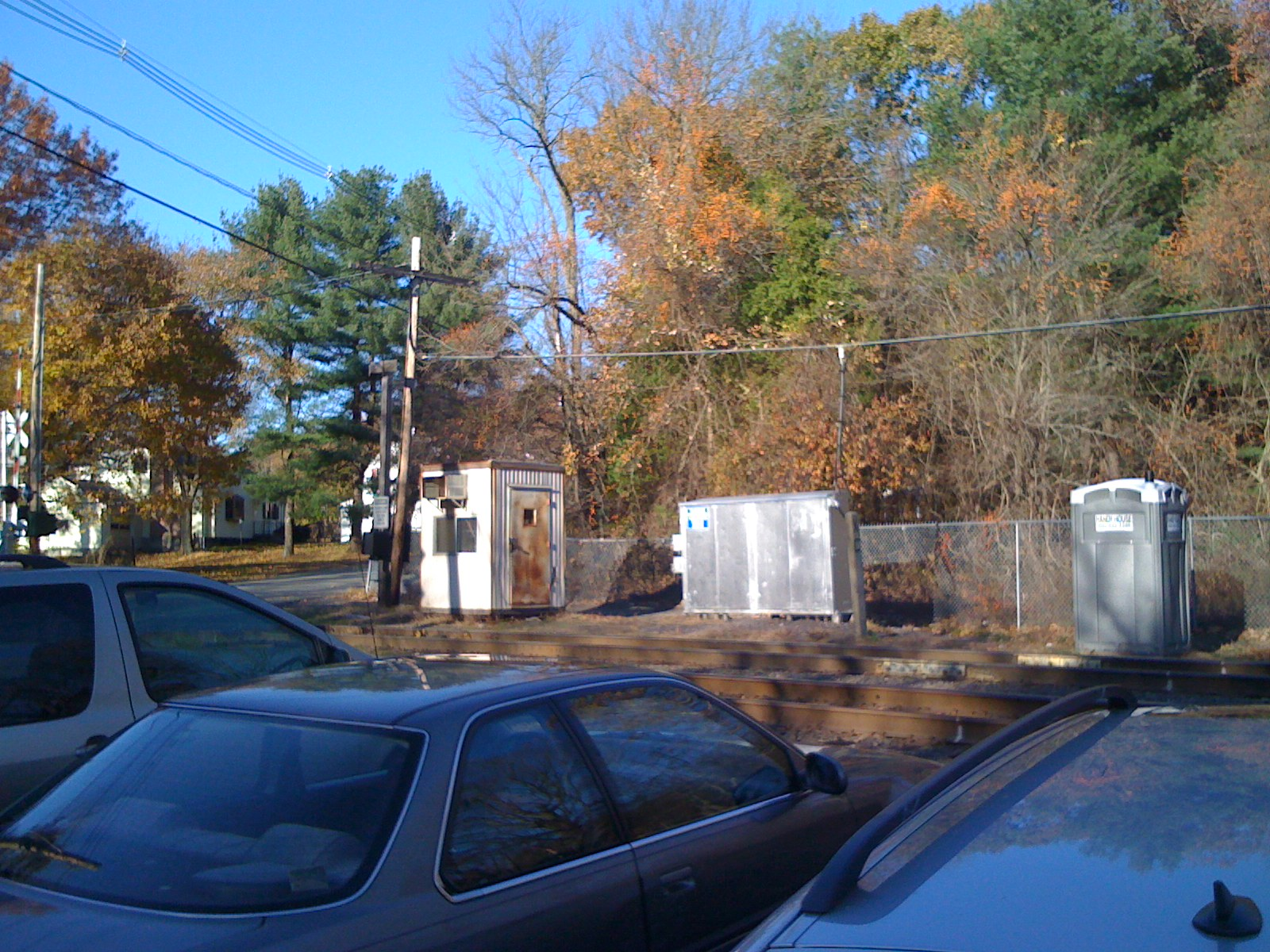
Vehicles parked at Hastings in 2008

The Massachusetts Bay Transportation Authority (MBTA) was formed in 1964 to subsidize suburban commuter rail service. On January 18, 1965, the MBTA began subsidizing some B&M service, including as far as West Concord on the Fitchburg Route. The MBTA bought most B&M commuter rail assets, including the Fitchburg Route, on December 27, 1976. On September 2, 1979, Hastings became the outer terminal for several round trips, using newly installed crossovers near the stop. It was only used as a turnback point until May 1981.

A February 2005 study for the Fitchburg Line Improvement Project recommended consolidation of the three Weston stations into a single expanded Kendal Green station to reduce travel times, as did a September 2005 preliminary implementation plan. However, by 2007, the preferred alternative did not include station consolidation. The crossovers at Hastings were replaced by a new interlocking in Lincoln and removed around 2013 as part of the improvement project.

=== Closure ===
With 18 weekday daily boardings by a 2018 count, Hastings was the fourth-lowest-ridership station in the MBTA Commuter Rail system. By that time, the station was served by only five peak-hour round trips out of nineteen weekday round trips operated on the Fitchburg Line; weekend service did not stop at the station. Reduced schedules based on existing Saturday schedules were in effect from March 16 to June 23, 2020, due to the COVID-19 pandemic. These schedules did not include Hastings and five other limited-service stations not normally served on Saturdays.

In November 2020, as part of service cuts during the pandemic, the MBTA proposed to close Hastings, Silver Hill, and four other low-ridership stations. Hastings was nominated for closure because of its low ridership and lack of accessibility; Kendal Green station is roughly 0.6 miles (0.97 km) to the southeast. On December 14, reduced schedules went into effect due to limited employee availability. Again based on the existing Saturday service, these temporary schedules did not include service to Hastings and four other stations. That day, the MBTA Board voted to enact a more limited set of cuts, including indefinitely closing Hastings, Silver Hill, and three of the other four stations. The indefinite closure of the five stations was effective with schedule changes on April 5, 2021. Silver Hill was reopened on November 18, 2024, while Hastings remained closed.
