= Clematis Brook station =

Rail station in Waltham, Massachusetts, US

Clematis Brook
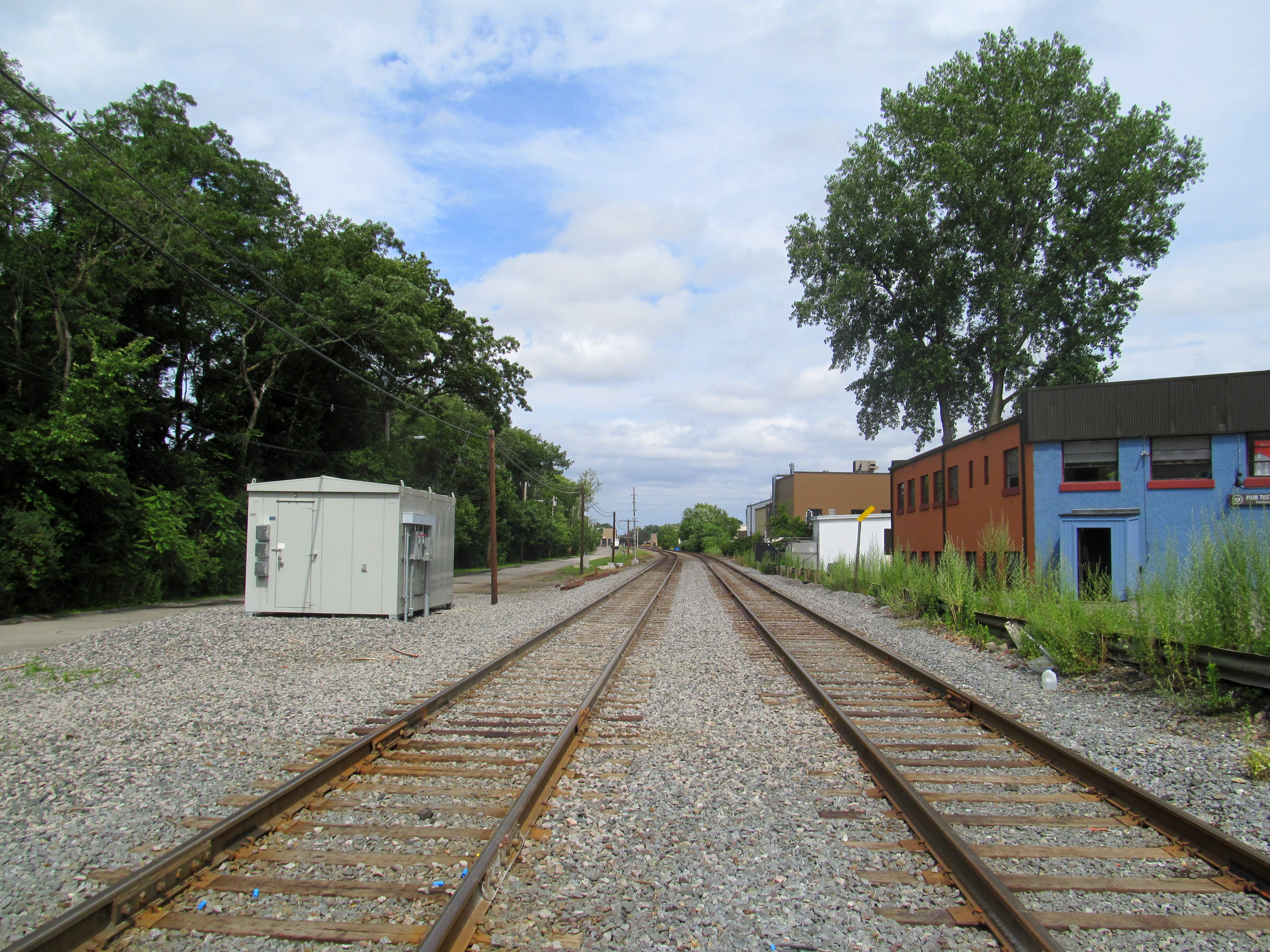
- The former station site photographed in 2015

General information
- Location: Beaver Street; Waltham, Massachusetts
- Coordinates: 42.382879°N 71.207558°W
- Lines: Fitchburg Route; Massachusetts Central Railroad; Central Massachusetts Branch (Boston & Maine); Central Mass Branch (MBTA)
- Platforms: 1
- Tracks: 2

Other information
- Fare zone: 1

History
- Closed: May 30, 1978

Former services
Preceding station	MBTA	Following station
Beaver Brook toward South Acton	Fitchburg Line until 1978	Waverley toward North Station
Preceding station	MBTA	Following station
Waltham North toward South Sudbury	Central Mass Branch until 1971	Cambridge toward North Station
Preceding station	Boston and Maine Railroad	Following station
Waltham North toward Northampton	Central Mass Branch until ca. 1960	Waverley toward Boston
Location

Clematis Brook station was an MBTA Commuter Rail station in Waltham, Massachusetts. It served the Fitchburg Line, and was located in the Warrendale section of Waltham. It was closed in 1978 due to poor ridership.

== History ==
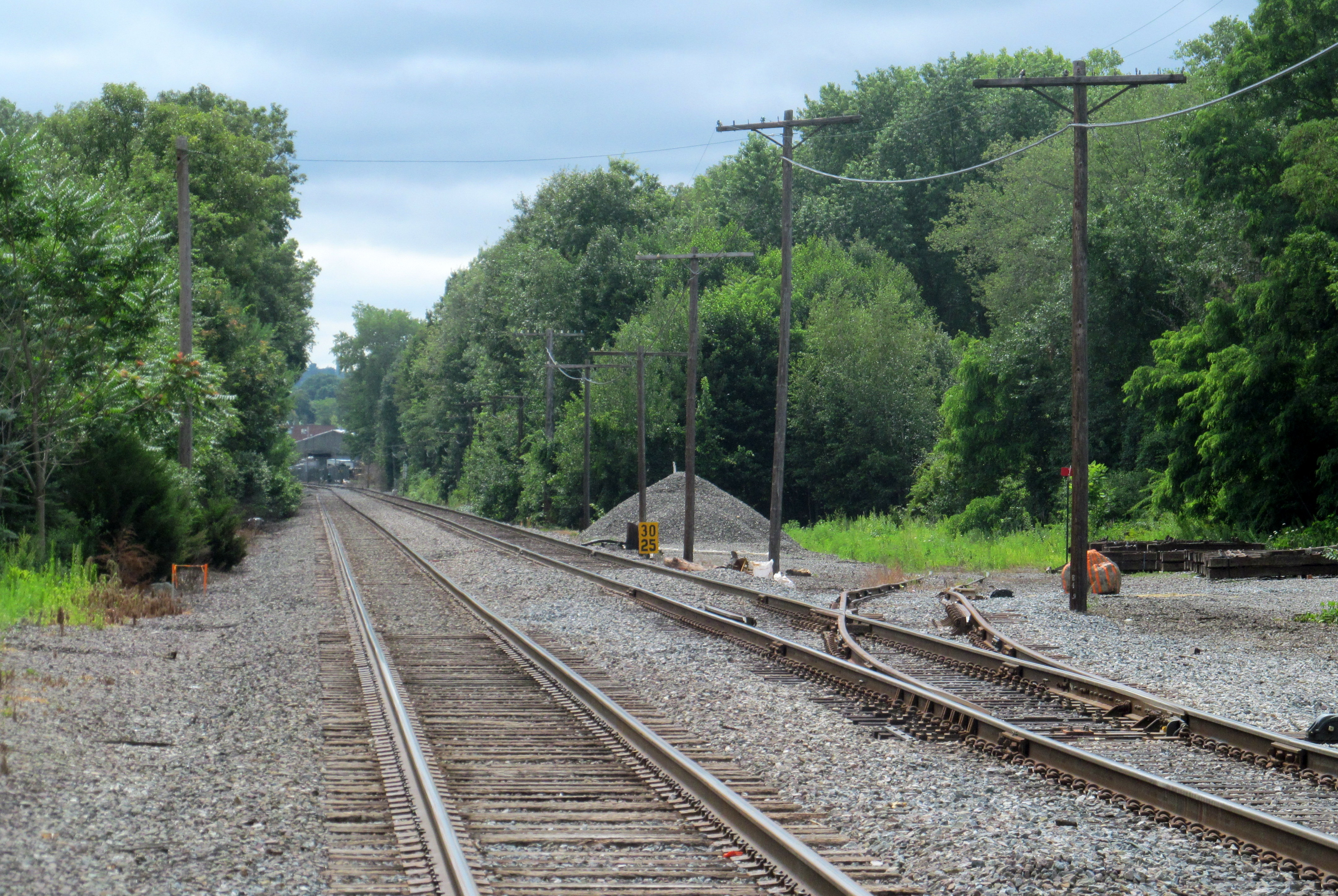
Former switch to the Central Mass Branch west of the station

The Fitchburg Railroad was completed through Waltham in 1845. In 1881, it was joined by the Massachusetts Central Railroad (MC), which paralleled it from west of Beaver Street to the Fitchburg Cutoff. By 1883, the MC was succeeded by the Central Massachusetts Railroad, which resumed service in 1885. By 1891, the two railroads shared a single Clematis Brook station on the east side of Beaver Street. (The other stations on the parallel segment – Waverley, Belmont, and Hill Crossing – had separate buildings for the two lines into the 20th century.) The Boston and Maine Railroad (B&M) gained control of the Central Massachusetts in 1887, followed by the Fitchburg in 1900.

In 1952, the B&M abandoned the duplicate Central Mass tracks during a grade separation project at Waverley. After the track consolidation, the Central Mass Branch diverged from the Fitchburg mainline just west of Clematis Brook. Central Mass Branch trains ceased serving the station between 1957 and 1962. The MBTA began subsidizing service in 1965. The remaining Central Mass Branch service was discontinued in 1971. Like nearby Beaver Brook station, Clematis Brook was only served by a handful of rush hour Fitchburg Line trips. The two stations were closed in June 1978, along with Winchester Highlands station on the Lowell Line, due to poor ridership.

The Mass Central Rail Trail—Wayside was extended east to Beaver Street in 2023.
