= Beaver Brook station =

Beaver Brook
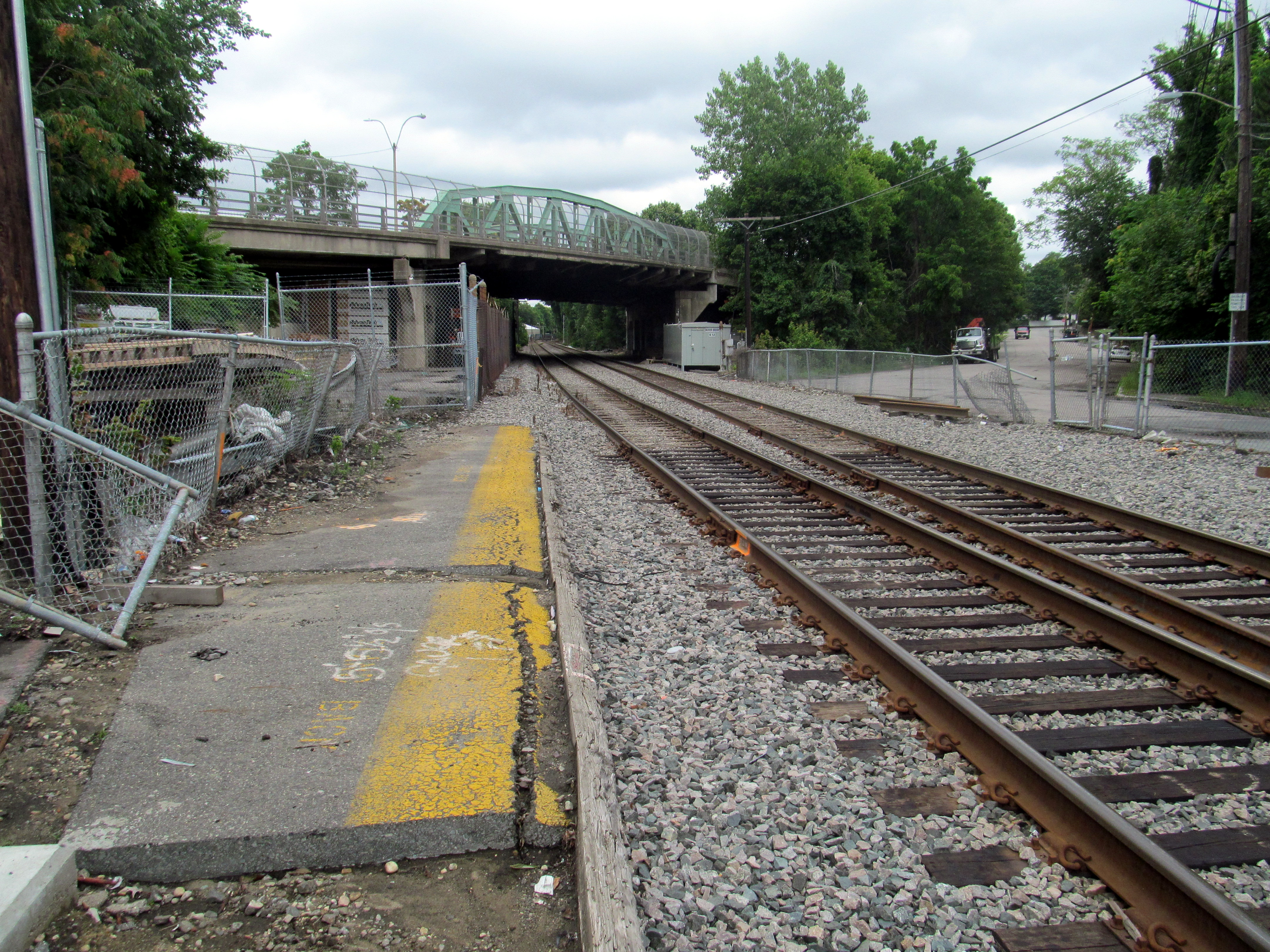
- Former Beaver Brook platform in July 2015

General information
- Location: Massasoit Street; Waltham, Massachusetts
- Coordinates: 42.377456°N 71.224417°W
- Owner: Boston and Maine Railroad
- Line: Fitchburg Line
- Platforms: 1
- Tracks: 2

History
- Closed: May 30, 1978

Services
Preceding station	MBTA	Following station
Waltham toward South Acton	Fitchburg Line	Clematis Brook toward North Station
Location

Beaver Brook is a former MBTA Commuter Rail station in Waltham, Massachusetts. It served the Fitchburg Line. It was located near Main Street east of the center of town, and was named after a nearby brook of the same name.

== History ==
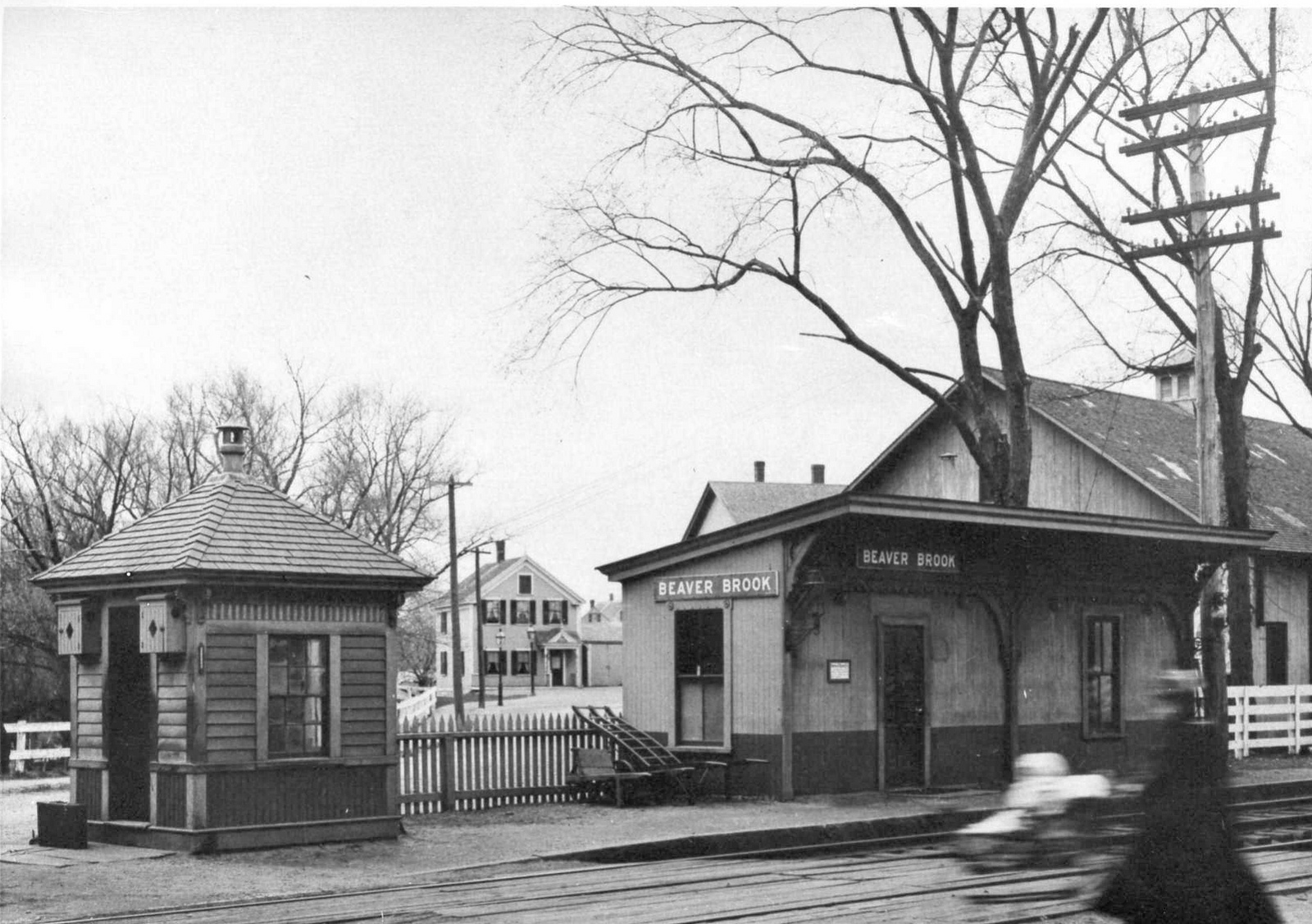
Beaver Brook station around 1900

The grade crossing of Main Street (Route 20) at the station was proposed for elimination in 1913 and 1923; it was finally replaced by a bridge slightly to the east in 1935–36 – the first grade crossing elimination conducted as a Works Progress Administration project.

In December 1958, Beaver Brook was one of eleven stations – four commuter rail stations in Waltham and Weston, and seven stops west of Fitchburg – on the Fitchburg Route proposed for closure. Stony Brook in Weston and the seven western stations were closed on June 14, 1959; limited service continued to Silver Hill, Riverview, and Beaver Brook.

The station was closed on May 30, 1978, along with Clematis Brook station on the Fitchburg Line and Winchester Highlands station on the Lowell Line. All three stops served only rush hour trains at the time of their closing.
