= Silver Hill station =

Railway station in Weston, Massachusetts, US

Silver Hill
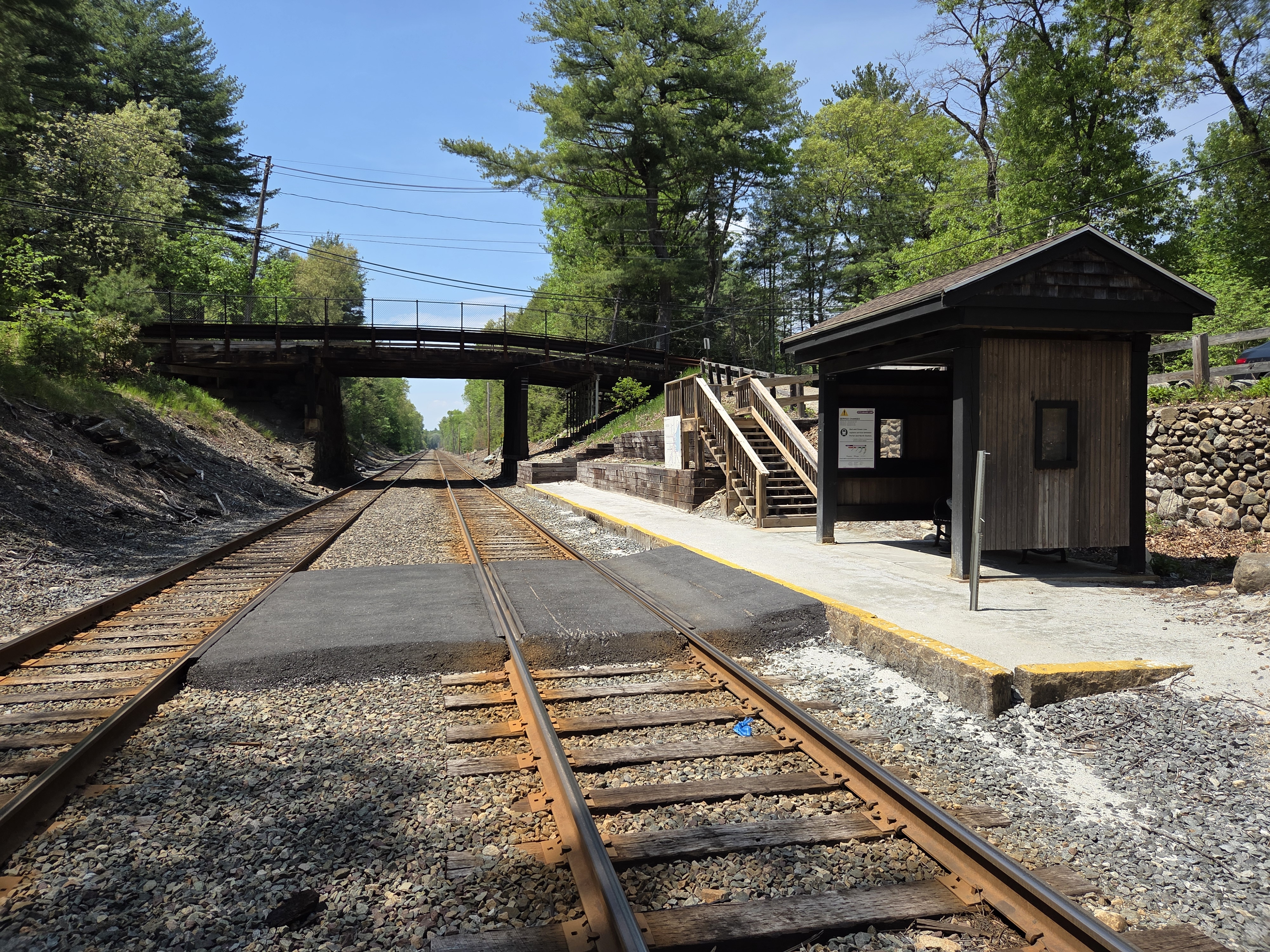
- Silver Hill station in May 2026

General information
- Location: Merriam Street at Silver Hill Road; Weston, Massachusetts
- Coordinates: 42.39570°N 71.30191°W
- Line: Fitchburg Route
- Platforms: 1 side platform
- Tracks: 2

Other information
- Fare zone: 3

History
- Opened: June 17, 1844
- Closed: December 14, 2020–November 18, 2024

Passengers
- 2018: 11 daily boardings

Services
Preceding station	MBTA	Following station
Lincoln toward Wachusett	Fitchburg Line	Kendal Green toward North Station
Location

Silver Hill station is an MBTA Commuter Rail Fitchburg Line station in Weston, Massachusetts, United States. The station has a small shelter, parking area, and a gravel boarding area; it is not accessible. It was the least-used station in the entire MBTA system in 2018, with an average of just eleven daily boardings. Silver Hill station opened in 1844 as one of the original stops on the Fitchburg Railroad. The Boston and Maine Railroad unsuccessfully attempted to close the station in 1959. It remained in use until its temporary closure by the Massachusetts Bay Transportation Authority (MBTA) in December 2020 due to low ridership and a lack of accessibility, with indefinite closure effective April 2021. It reopened on November 18, 2024.

== Station design ==
Silver Hill station is located at Merriam Street in Weston, about 1,400 feet (430 m) away from North Avenue (Route 117). The station has a single unpaved gravel boarding area on the north side of the tracks. The station is not accessible. A dirt parking lot on the north side of the tracks, largely intended for kiss-and-ride purposes, provides space for six vehicles. A small three-sided wooden shelter is located next to the platform, adjacent to a set of stairs from the parking lot.

== History ==
=== Early history ===
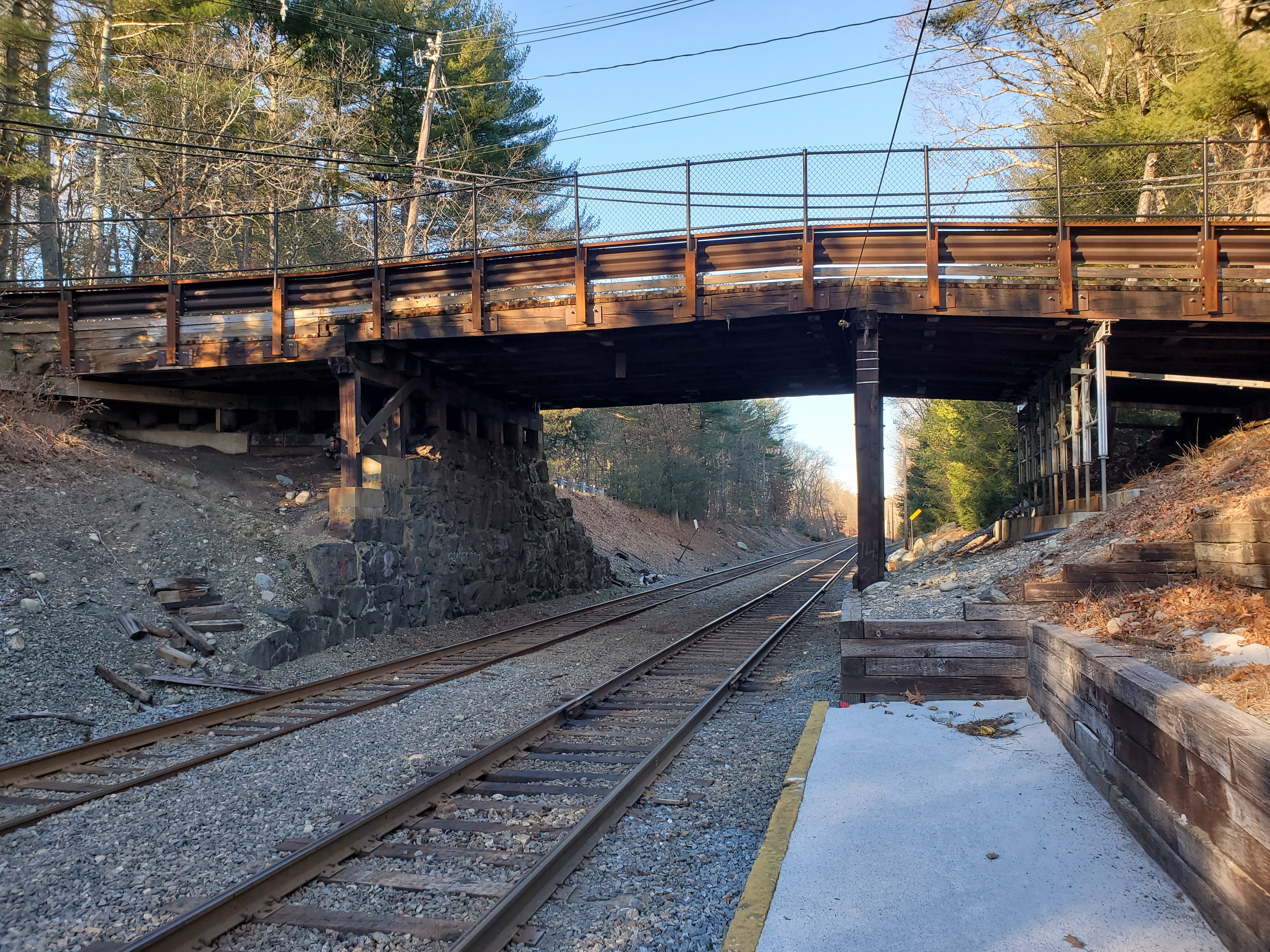
The 1926-built Merriam Street bridge

The Fitchburg Railroad opened along the Stony Brook valley through Weston on June 17, 1844, with stops at Weston (later Kendal Green) and Silver Hill. The origin of the name "Silver Hill" is uncertain; it may refer to local rumors of Captain Kidd hiding his treasure on a nearby hill, or a stand of silver birches. Unlike Weston, Silver Hill did not immediately attract new development around the station. The Fitchburg Railroad was acquired by the Boston and Maine Railroad (B&M) in 1900.

In 1905, the Weston Land Association began the development of a garden suburb called Silver Hill in the area directly south of the station. The station building was destroyed on March 17, 1893, by a fire caused by sparks from a passing locomotive. Its replacement was a small wooden station building, located on the north side of the tracks east of Merriam Street, with steps leading to the platform from the street. That structure was gone by 1977. A wooden bridge was constructed in 1926 to carry Merriam Street over the tracks.

In December 1958, Silver Hill was one of eleven stations – four commuter rail stations in Waltham and Weston, and seven stops west of Fitchburg – on the Fitchburg Route proposed for closure. Stony Brook in Weston and the seven western stations were closed on June 14, 1959; limited service continued to Silver Hill, Riverview, and Beaver Brook.

=== MBTA era ===
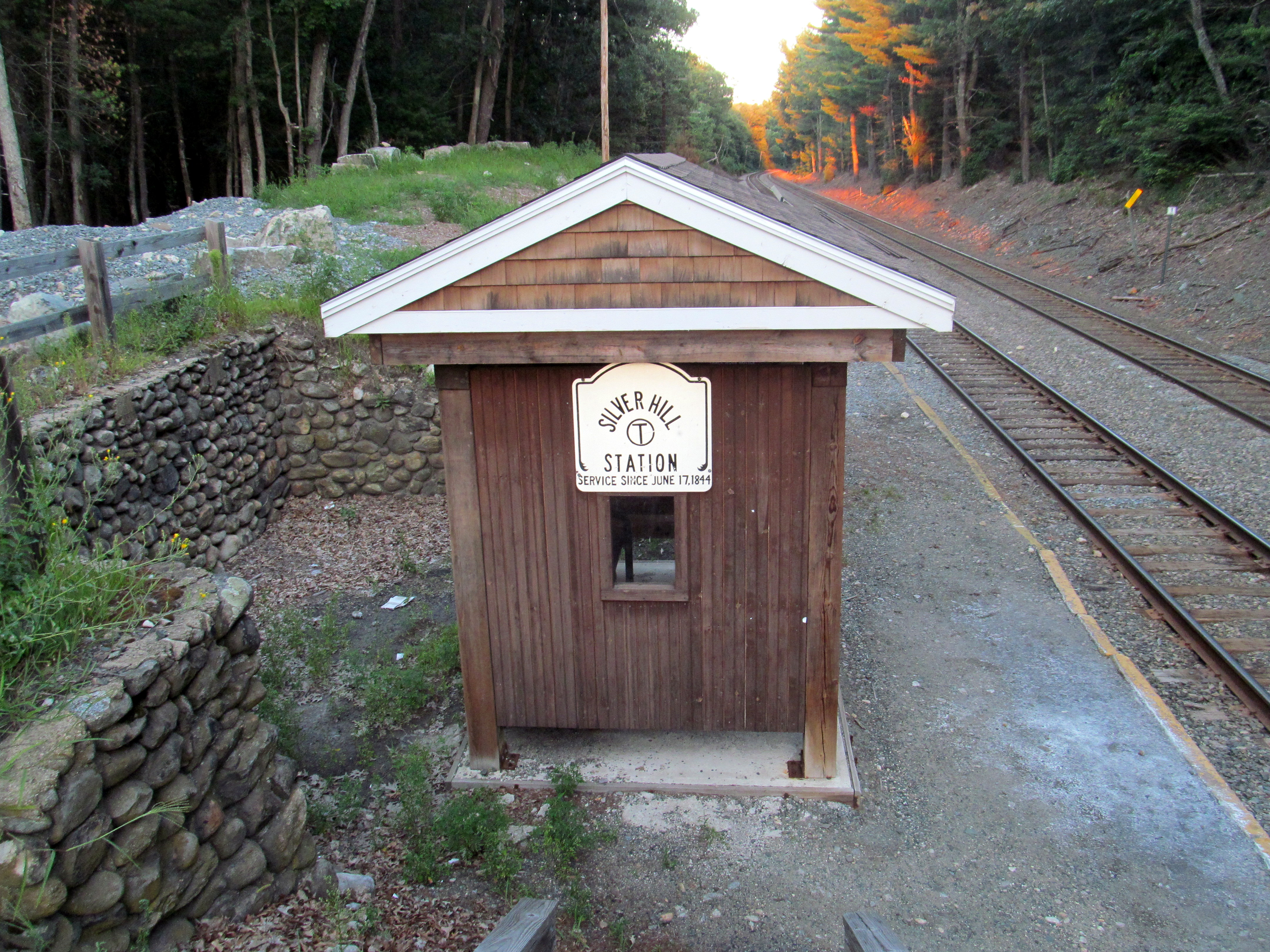
The 1979-built shelter in 2015. The retaining wall formerly surrounded the station building.

The Massachusetts Bay Transportation Authority (MBTA) was formed in 1964 to subsidize suburban commuter rail service. On January 18, 1965, the MBTA began subsidizing some B&M service, including as far as West Concord on the Fitchburg Route. The MBTA bought most B&M commuter rail assets, including the Fitchburg Route, on December 27, 1976.

A three-sided shelter, which resembled similar shelters commonly found at flag stops decades before, was built in 1979 to replace the former station building. The station was briefly closed on February 1, 1981, due to budget cuts, but reopened soon after. The Merriam Street bridge was added to the National Register of Historic Places in 2004 as a contributing property to the Silver Hill Historic District.

A February 2005 study for the Fitchburg Line Improvement Project recommended consolidation of the three Weston stations (Silver Hill, Hastings, and Kendal Green) into a single expanded Kendal Green station to reduce travel times, as did a September 2005 preliminary implementation plan. However, by 2007, the preferred alternative did not include station consolidation.

=== Closure and reopening ===
With 11 weekday daily boardings by a 2018 count, Silver Hill was the lowest-ridership station in the MBTA Commuter Rail system. By that time, the station was served by only two peak-hour inbound trips and three peak-hour outbound trips out of nineteen weekday round trips operated on the Fitchburg Line; weekend service did not stop at the station. Reduced schedules based on existing Saturday schedules were in effect from March 16 to June 23, 2020, due to the COVID-19 pandemic. These schedules did not include Silver Hill and five other limited-service stations not normally served on Saturdays.

In November 2020, as part of service cuts during the pandemic, the MBTA proposed to permanently close Silver Hill, Hastings, and four other low-ridership stations. Silver Hill was nominated for closure because of its low ridership and lack of accessibility; Kendal Green station is just 1.5 miles (2.4 km) to the southeast. On December 14, reduced schedules went into effect due to limited employee availability. Again based on the existing Saturday service, these temporary schedules did not include service to Silver Hill and four other stations. That day, the MBTA Board voted to enact a more limited set of cuts, including indefinitely closing Hastings, Silver Hill, and three of the other four stations. The closure of the five stations became indefinite effective April 5, 2021. The station reopened on November 18, 2024, with service by two inbound and three outbound trains on weekdays only.
