= Kendal Green station =

MBTA Commuter Rail station in Weston, Massachusetts

Kendal Green
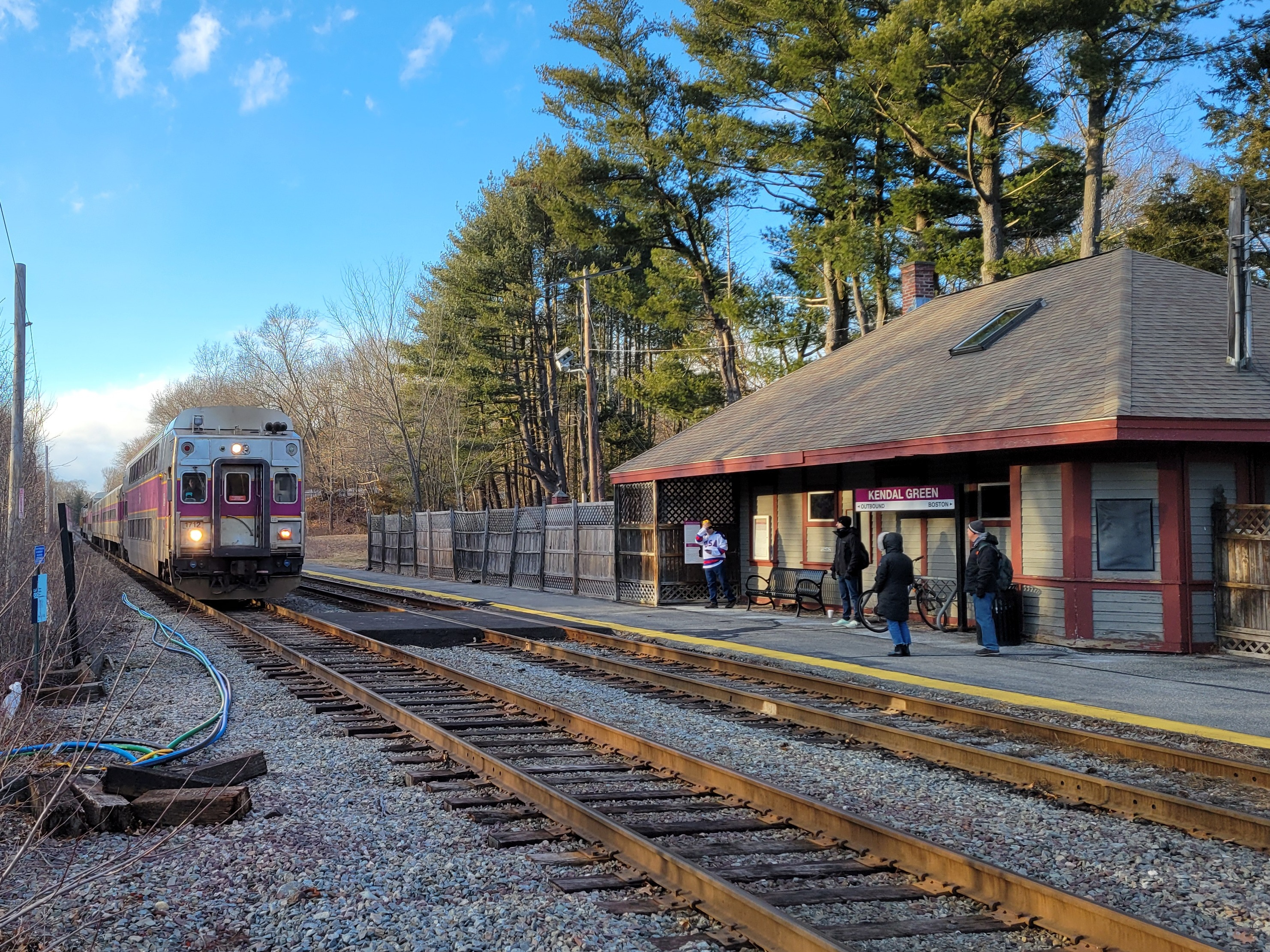
- A train arriving at Kendal Green station in February 2024

General information
- Location: 205 Church Street; Weston, Massachusetts
- Coordinates: 42°22′45″N 71°16′57″W
- Line: Fitchburg Route
- Platforms: 1 side platform
- Tracks: 2

Construction
- Parking: 57 spaces (free)
- Accessible: No

Other information
- Fare zone: 3

History
- Opened: June 17, 1844
- Rebuilt: 1896
- Former names: Weston (until c. 1886)

Passengers
- 2024: 130 daily boardings

Services
Preceding station	MBTA	Following station
Silver Hill toward Wachusett	Fitchburg Line	Brandeis/Roberts toward North Station
- Kendal Green Railroad Station
- U.S. Historic district – Contributing property
- Part of: Kendal Green Historic District (ID01000121)
- Added to NRHP: March 1, 2000
Location

Kendal Green station is an MBTA Commuter Rail station in Weston, Massachusetts, US, served by the Fitchburg Line. The station has a single platform serving two tracks; it is not accessible. It originally opened with the Fitchburg Railroad in 1844 as "Weston"; it was renamed Kendal Green after the green cloth around 1886. A new station building was constructed in 1896. Service passed to the Boston and Maine Railroad in 1900, and to the Massachusetts Bay Transportation Authority (MBTA) in the 1970s. The former station building, reused as a private residence, was added to the National Register of Historic Places in 2000 as a contributing property to the Kendal Green Historic District.

== Station design ==
Kendal Green station is located on the north side of the Church Street grade crossing in Weston, about 400 feet (120 m) away from North Avenue (Route 117). The station has a single asphalt side platform on the north side of the two tracks of the Fitchburg Route, with a small paved crossing allowing passengers to board trains on the opposite track. The low-level platform is not accessible. Parking spaces for 57 vehicles are located along Lower Field Road south of Church Street.

The former station building is located adjacent to the platform. It is a single-story hip-roofed clapboard building measuring 20 by 42 feet (6.1 m × 12.8 m), with a polygonal bay in the southern corner. The structure is privately owned and used as a residence, though the MBTA owns the land; the trackside eaves still offer shelter for passengers. The trackside windows and doors have been covered for the privacy of the residents.

== History ==
=== Early history ===
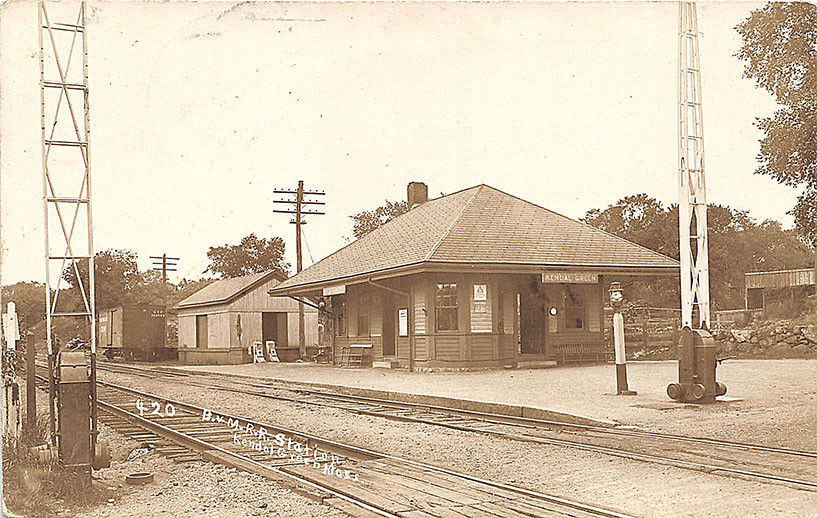
Kendal Green station on a 1913 postcard

The Fitchburg Railroad opened along the Stony Brook valley through Weston on June 17, 1844, with stops at Weston and Silver Hill. New residential development occurred around Weston station, but not around Silver Hill. The original Weston station building, constructed around 1843, was a two-story wooden structure with an apartment for the station master on the second floor. A freight house, no longer extant, was constructed nearby in 1875.

The Central Massachusetts Railroad was constructed through Weston in 1881, with its own Weston station closer to the town center. In 1885–86, a post office was opened to serve the North Avenue area. It was named "Kendal Green" at the suggestion of General James F.B. Marshall, co-founder of the Hampton Institute, who had previously used it as the name of his nearby estate. The name was taken from the Kendal green cloth produced in Kendal, England; Kendal was also the surname of Marshall's grandfather. The railroad station also took the name Kendal Green around 1886, possibly to avoid confusion with the two Weston stations.

The railroad built a new station building at Kendal Green in 1896. A single-story wooden structure, it resembled a simpler version of the Central Massachusetts Railroad's stick style Weston station. The Fitchburg Railroad was acquired by the Boston and Maine Railroad (B&M) in 1900.

=== MBTA era ===
The B&M sold off disused station buildings in the mid 20th century; by 1962, Kendal Green and Weston stations both belonged to the same private owner. The Massachusetts Bay Transportation Authority (MBTA) was formed in 1964 to subsidize suburban commuter rail service. On January 18, 1965, the MBTA began subsidizing some B&M service, including as far as West Concord on the Fitchburg Route. The MBTA bought most B&M commuter rail assets, including the Fitchburg Route, on December 27, 1976.

In 1989, the MBTA considered moving the station to the south to create a park and ride "superstation" for Route 128, similar to Route 128 station. In 1998, the town considered purchasing the former station building to make room for a 40-space parking lot. The building was added to the National Register of Historic Places in 2000 as a contributing property to the Kendal Green Historic District.

A February 2005 study for the Fitchburg Line Improvement Project recommended consolidation of the three Weston stations (Silver Hill, Hastings, and Kendal Green) into a single expanded Kendal Green station to reduce travel times, as did a September 2005 preliminary implementation plan. However, by 2007, the preferred alternative did not include station consolidation. Silver Hill and Hastings were temporarily closed in December 2020 due to low ridership, which was made permanent in April 2021, but Kendal Green station was not modified. In May 2024, the MBTA indicated the possibility of building accessible platforms shorter than standard length at Kendal Green.
