= Fitchburg Line =

MBTA Commuter Rail line

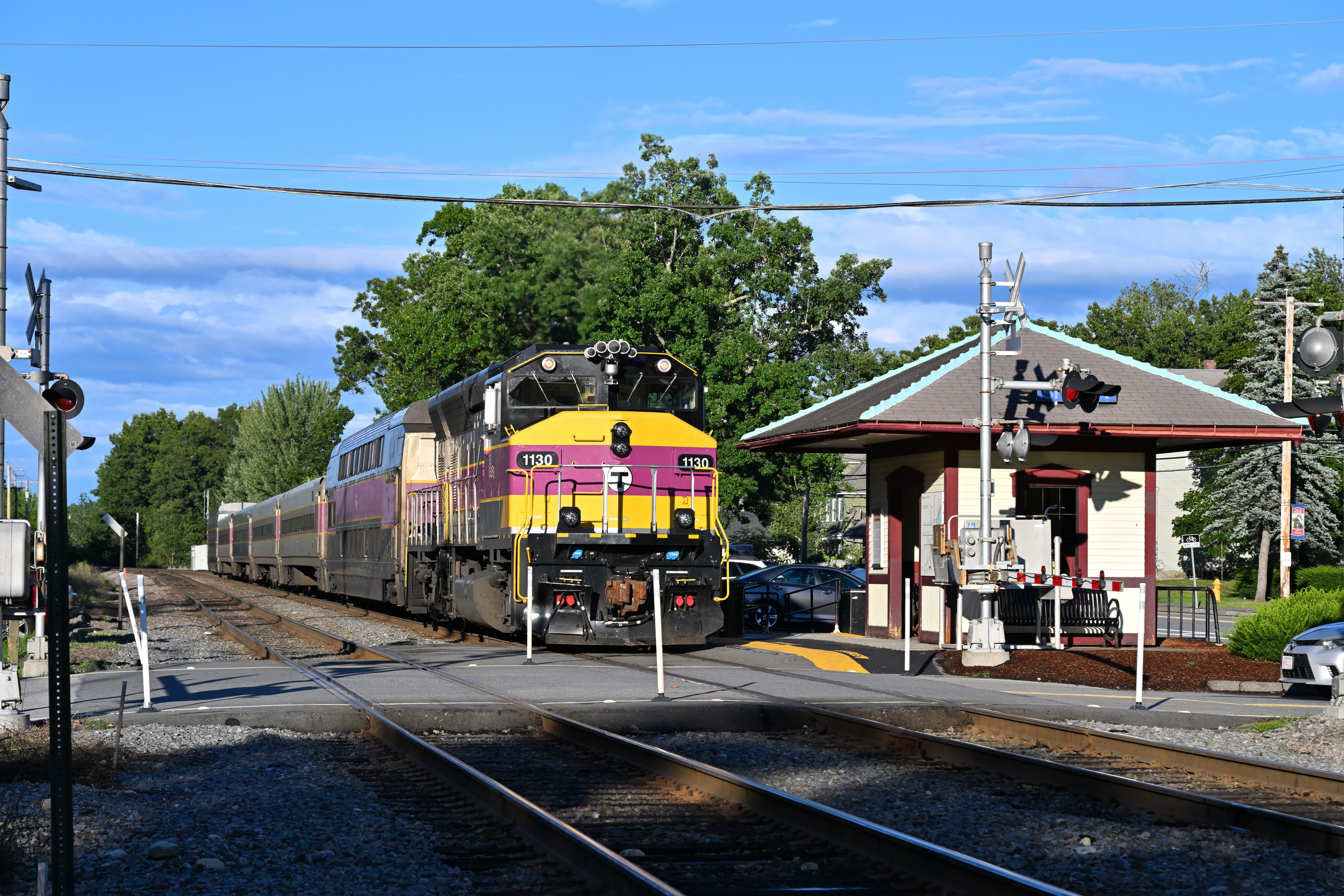
- An inbound train departing Shirley in 2026

Overview
- Owner: Massachusetts Bay Transportation Authority
- Locale: Greater Boston
- Termini: Wachusett; North Station
- Stations: 17

Service
- Type: Commuter rail/regional rail
- System: MBTA Commuter Rail
- Train number(s): 4001-4028, 4301-4310 (weekdays); 4501-4516 (weekends)
- Operator: Keolis North America
- Daily ridership: 6,288 (2024)

Technical
- Line length: 54 miles (87 km)
- Num of tracks: 2
- Track gauge: 4 ft 8 1/2 in (1,435 mm)

The Fitchburg Line is a branch of the MBTA Commuter Rail system which runs from Boston's North Station to Wachusett station in Fitchburg, Massachusetts, United States. The line is along the tracks of the former Fitchburg Railroad, which was built across northern Massachusetts in the 1840s. Winter weekend service includes a specially equipped seasonal "ski train" to Wachusett Mountain.

At 54 miles (87 km) long, the Fitchburg Line is the third-longest line in the system (and was the longest until the Providence/Stoughton Line's 2010 extension to T. F. Green Airport and later to Wickford Junction), and ranked as one of the worst lines in terms of on-time performance. The Fitchburg Line had the oldest infrastructure in the system, and commuter trains must share trackage with freight trains on the outer segment of the line. A $150 million project completed in 2017 included adding nine miles of double track, an extension to Wachusett, rebuilding two stations, and building a new layover yard. Only ten of the line's nineteen stations, including both terminals, are fully handicapped accessible – the lowest proportion of any MBTA Commuter Rail line.

== History ==
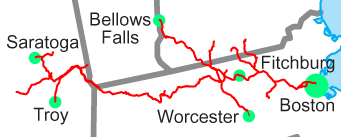
Geographic map of the Fitchburg Railroad

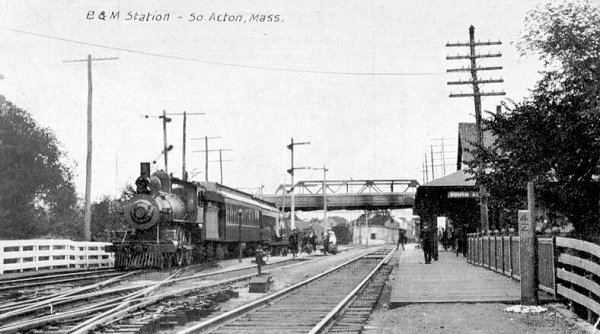
A branch line train at South Acton station in 1911

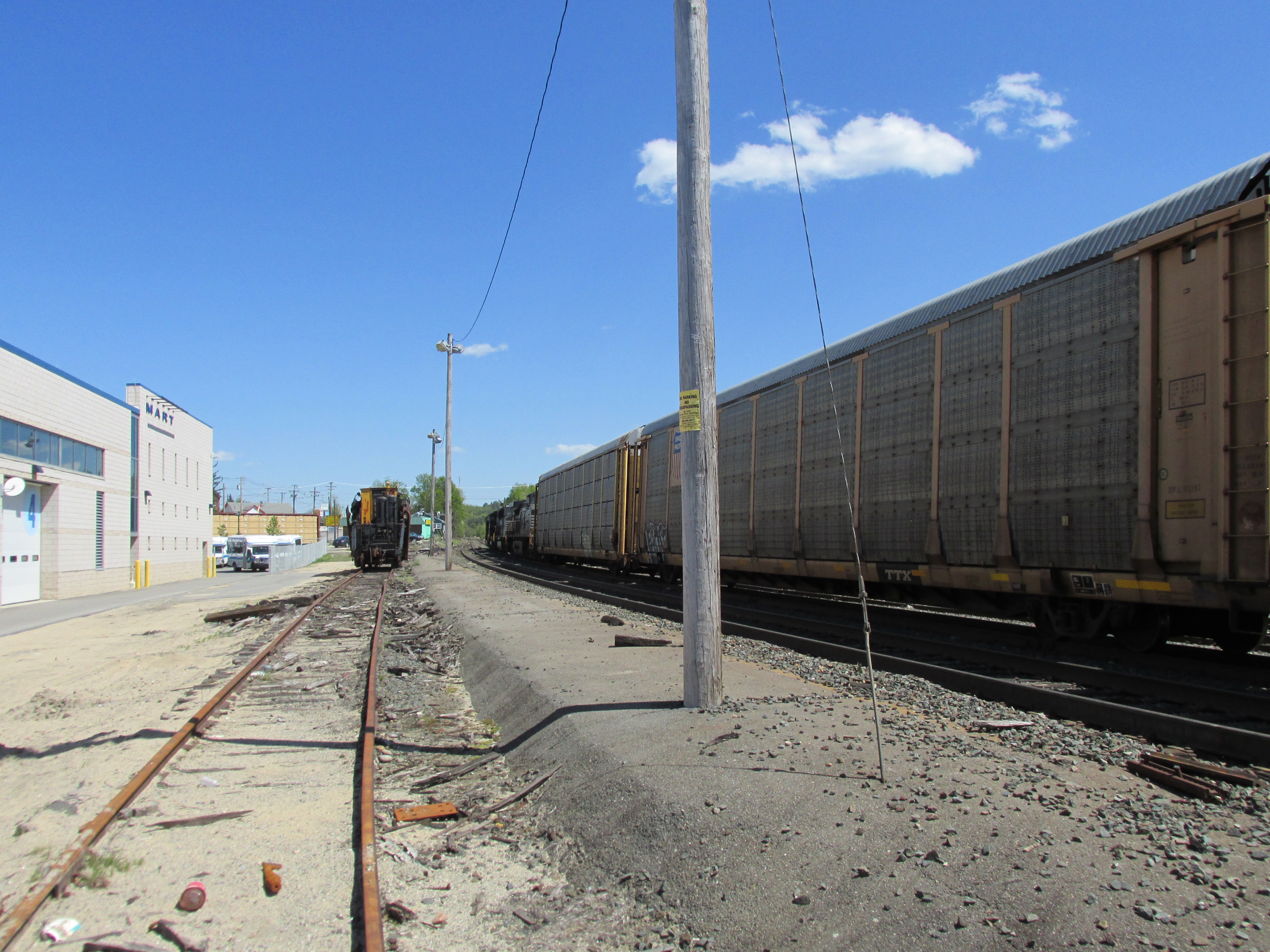
Former platform at Gardner, the terminus of the line from 1980 to 1987

=== Boston & Maine ===
The Fitchburg Railroad was founded in 1842, and completed from Boston to Fitchburg in 1845. In 1854, Henry David Thoreau wrote about his skepticism of the Fitchburg Railroad near Walden Pond in his book Walden. The Boston and Maine Railroad leased the Fitchburg Railroad in 1900 and bought it outright in 1919.

In 1948, The Master Highway Plan for the Boston Metropolitan Area proposed the construction of eight radial expressways around Boston connecting to the Inner Belt, Interstate 695. A section of the Northwest Expressway, carrying a concurrency of Route 2 and Route 3, was to run along the Fitchburg right-of-way from Union Square in Somerville to Sherman Street in North Cambridge. This expressway would have taken up some or all of the trackbed, which was then four tracks wide in that section. After successful highway revolts, Governor Francis W. Sargent placed a hold on all highway construction inside Route 128 in 1970. Following a study, Sargent permanently canceled the 1948 plans in 1972, thus also securing the corridor's future for railroad use.

In January 1958, passenger service on the Fitchburg Division was cut back from the B&M's western terminal in Troy, New York to Williamstown; branch line service to Bellows Falls, Vermont, (with connections for Montreal) and Maynard was discontinued that May, while Main Line service was further truncated to Greenfield in December. All service west of Fitchburg was dropped on 23 April 1960.

=== MBTA era ===
When the newly formed MBTA began subsidizing the Boston & Maine Railroad's intrastate service on January 18, 1965, service was only kept to communities in the MBTA's limited funding district. All service on the Fitchburg Line west of West Concord was cut, as was the low-ridership stop at Riverview; several other northside lines were cut or run at reduced service levels as well. The MBTA scrambled to find funding; subsidy agreements were soon reached with towns along the lines. Service was restored as far as Ayer on June 28, 1965, along with the outer Rockport Branch and full schedules on the Lowell and Ipswich routes.

Although some gains were made, including the reopening of Belmont Center and Waverley stations on March 4, 1974, the system continued to hang on by thin margins. The Central Mass Branch, which shared trackage with the Fitchburg, was cut on November 26, 1971. In December 1973, state subsidies for towns outside the MBTA funding district were halved, resulting in the MBTA needing to renegotiate subsidies from 14 municipalities. Ultimately Ayer, with just 14 daily commuters, refused to pay its $8,200 bill in 1974; Littleton also refused $12,300 for its 21 riders. On March 1, 1975, the line was cut back to South Acton, dropping stops at Ayer, Littleton, and West Acton. Two lightly used stops in Waltham – Clematis Brook and Beaver Brook – closed in June 1978.

On December 27, 1976, the MBTA bought the Boston and Maine Railroad's northside commuter rail assets, including the entire length of the Fitchburg Line. The closure of the Lexington Branch the next month represented the limit of the contraction of the northside lines; as a result of the 1970s energy crisis and especially the 1979 energy crisis, a period of rapid expansion began in the end of the 1970s. Service was restored to Fitchburg and beyond to Gardner on January 13, 1980. Potential infill stations in Westminster and South Ashburnham were included in a 1981 fare tariff, but never added. Gardner service was ended on January 1, 1987, when Amtrak took over the MBTA contract, due to a dispute between Amtrak and Guilford; the MBTA only owned the trackage to Fitchburg.

During the 1980–81 through 1982–83 ski seasons, MBTA and the Montachusett Regional Transit Authority offered coordinated rail/bus service to ski areas at Wachusett Mountain and Mount Watatic on winter Saturdays. In December 2006, the MBTA again began branding certain winter weekend round trips as "ski trains". The train used includes a car equipped with ski racks; a shuttle bus to Wachusett Mountain connects at Wachusett station. (Until the 2016–2017 ski season, the bus ran to Fitchburg station instead.)

=== Improvement project ===
Due to the cyclic expansion and contraction for the first three decades of the MBTA's existence, the Fitchburg Line was largely neglected and its infrastructure began to decline. The Fitchburg route was once fully double tracked from Boston to Troy, New York; however, the second main was removed in many sections as passenger service declined. By 2000, there was a 9 miles (14 km) section of single track between South Acton and Ayer, and a shorter section in Waltham. This limited the number of trains which could continue past South Acton to Fitchburg.

Until the extension of the Providence leg of the Providence/Stoughton Line to T.F. Green Airport in 2010, the Fitchburg Line was the longest line on the MBTA system; it is now the second longest, and still the longest without full double track.

==== Studies ====
In 2000, the Massachusetts State Legislature passed a bill that directed the MBTA to "conduct a feasibility study regarding the reestablishment of the commuter rail line to the cities of Gardner and Athol on the existing Fitchburg/Gardner/Athol spur line" as one of many expansion and improvement projects. In 2001, the MBTA began taking public comment for the decadal update to its Program for Mass Transportation. Following response from legislators from communities along the line, the MBTA initiated a study of potential improvements to the line, including not only westward extension but also station improvements and travel time reductions.

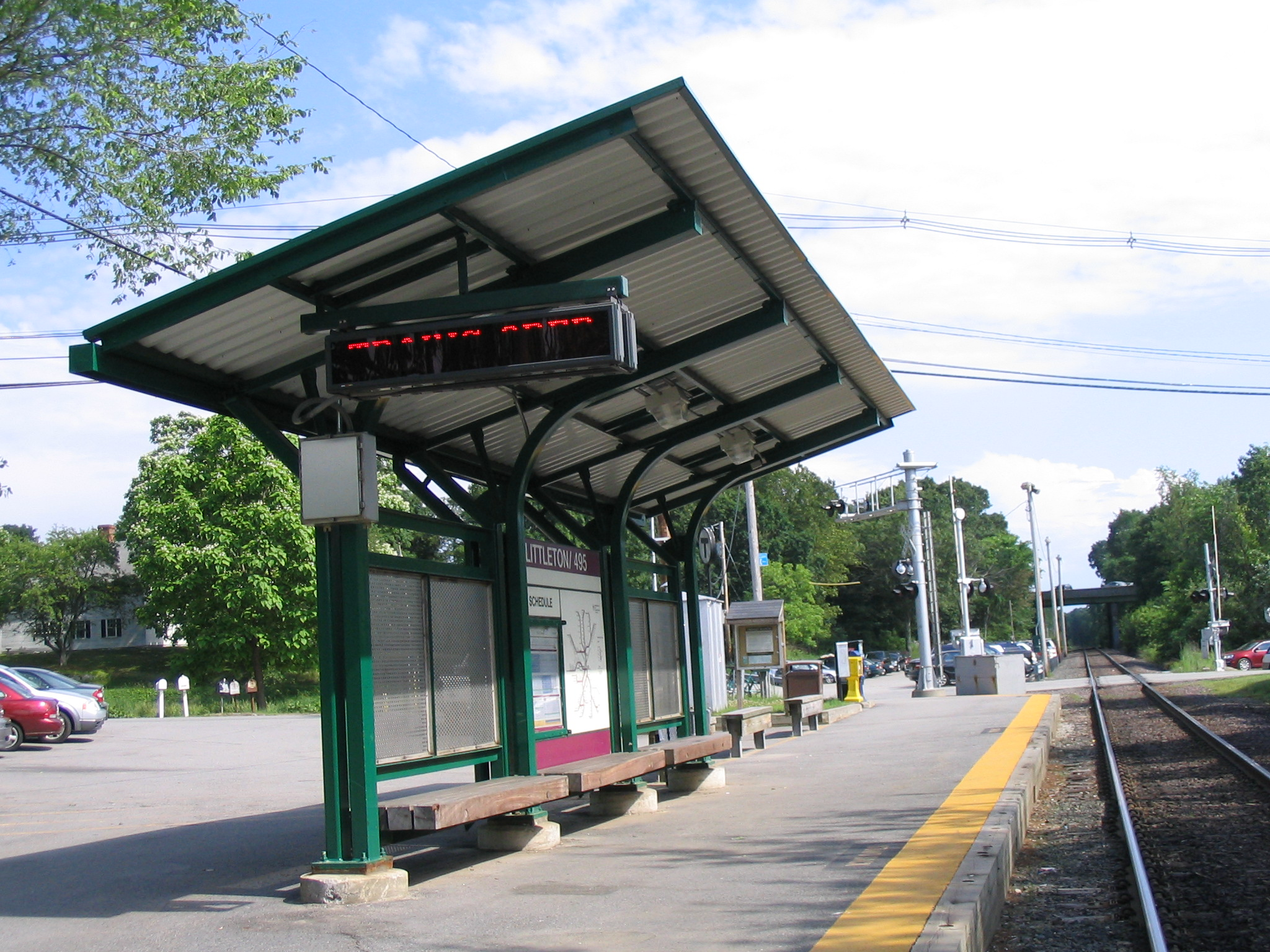
Before the improvement project, Littleton/Route 495 station had a non-accessible low platform served by a single track.

The 2004 edition of the Program for Mass Transportation found that restoration of service all the way to Gardner, much less Athol, was deemed impractical for several reasons. Gardner is 64 miles (103 km) and Athol 81 miles (130 km) by rail from North Station – outside normal commuting distances. The line between Fitchburg and Gardner would cost $104.2 million to double track, and speeds are limited due to the grades going through the Wachusett Mountain range. Because the Route 2 expressway is faster along the corridor than rail service would be, the station at Gardner would have attracted just 50 riders per day. Instead, a 4-mile extension to a previously considered station in West Fitchburg was recommended.

The Fitchburg Commuter Rail Line Service Expansion Study was released in February 2005, drawing off the PMT conclusions. Recommended short-range improvements included station consolidation, track upgrades, and station improvements; longer-term projects included double-tracking, increased service frequency, and an extension to Wachusett or Gardner. The report priced out $55 million in infrastructure upgrades including double tracking through downtown Waltham and from South Acton to Willows, signal improvements, rebuilding Littleton/Route 495 station, and grade crossing modifications. An extension to Wachusett was to cost $39 million, with Gardner costing an additional $50 million. As an immediate change, the MBTA began running express trains on the line.

The Fitchburg Commuter Rail Line Improvement Implementation Plan, released in September 2005, included a longer list of possible improvements, and outlined a goal of reducing travel time between Porter Square and Fitchburg to one hour. The $300 million list included high-level platforms at all stops from Porter to Littleton, grade crossing eliminations, a flyover at Willows, and stop consolidations. The three Weston stops were to be combined, Ayer and Shirley combined into a Devens station, and Waverley and Belmont stations combined. Few of these expanded alternatives were ultimately pursued.

The MBTA applied for a federal Small Starts grant in September 2005, and the Montachusett Regional Transit Authority filed a scoping package in April 2007 that began the analysis of construction alternatives. The Fitchburg Commuter Rail Line Improvements Project Alternatives Analysis was released in September 2007 and outlined six options: no build with the addition of some continuously welded rail to the line, a $30 million baseline with a new layover facility, and three build options ranging from $150 million to $239 million. Build Alternative 1, costing $150 million, was chosen.

A proposal known as Northern Tier Passenger Rail is in the early stages of planning, and would extend the Fitchburg Line westward through Greenfield and terminate at North Adams, following the existing CSX (formerly Pan Am) rail corridor. The first official study meeting was scheduled to take place in Fall 2021. In January 2023, MassDOT announced that the total price for corridor track upgrades would cost between $1.044 billion to $2.187 billion and would take three years to construct. The line is currently planned for either electric or diesel service provided by Amtrak with at least five round trips per day; there is currently no timeline for service implementation.

==== Funding and construction ====
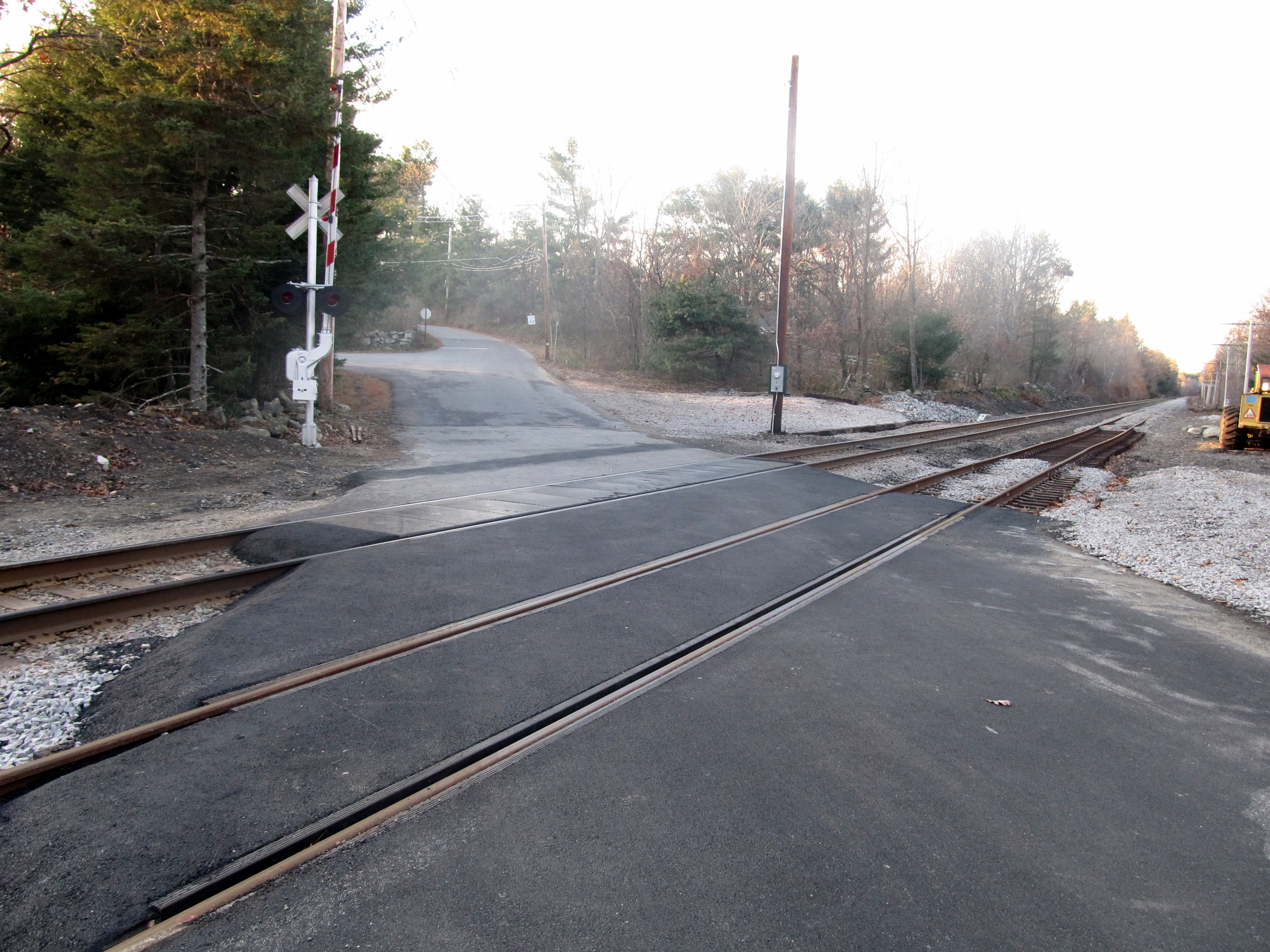
Double tracking and a rebuilt crossing at Boxborough in November 2012

In November 2007, following the completion of five years of conceptual studies, the MBTA announced $150 million in projects to significantly upgrade the Fitchburg Line. The project focuses on reducing travel times, increasing service frequency, and improving on-time performance. With the addition of several smaller funding sources, the improvements ultimately became a $306 million project with five major components:

===== CPF-43 interlocking =====
The first work completed was the addition of CPF-43, a new interlocking located at Derby Curve in Leominster. Financed by $10.2 million in ARRA funds, the work was intended to "provide commuter rail operational flexibility and to minimize conflicts with freight". CPF-43 includes a universal crossover between the two mainline tracks, plus a new connection to a siding with 1,000 feet (300 m) of space for maintenance-of-way equipment storage and 1000 feet to connect to existing freight customers. Construction work began in October 2009 and finished by the end of 2011.

===== North Leominster garage =====
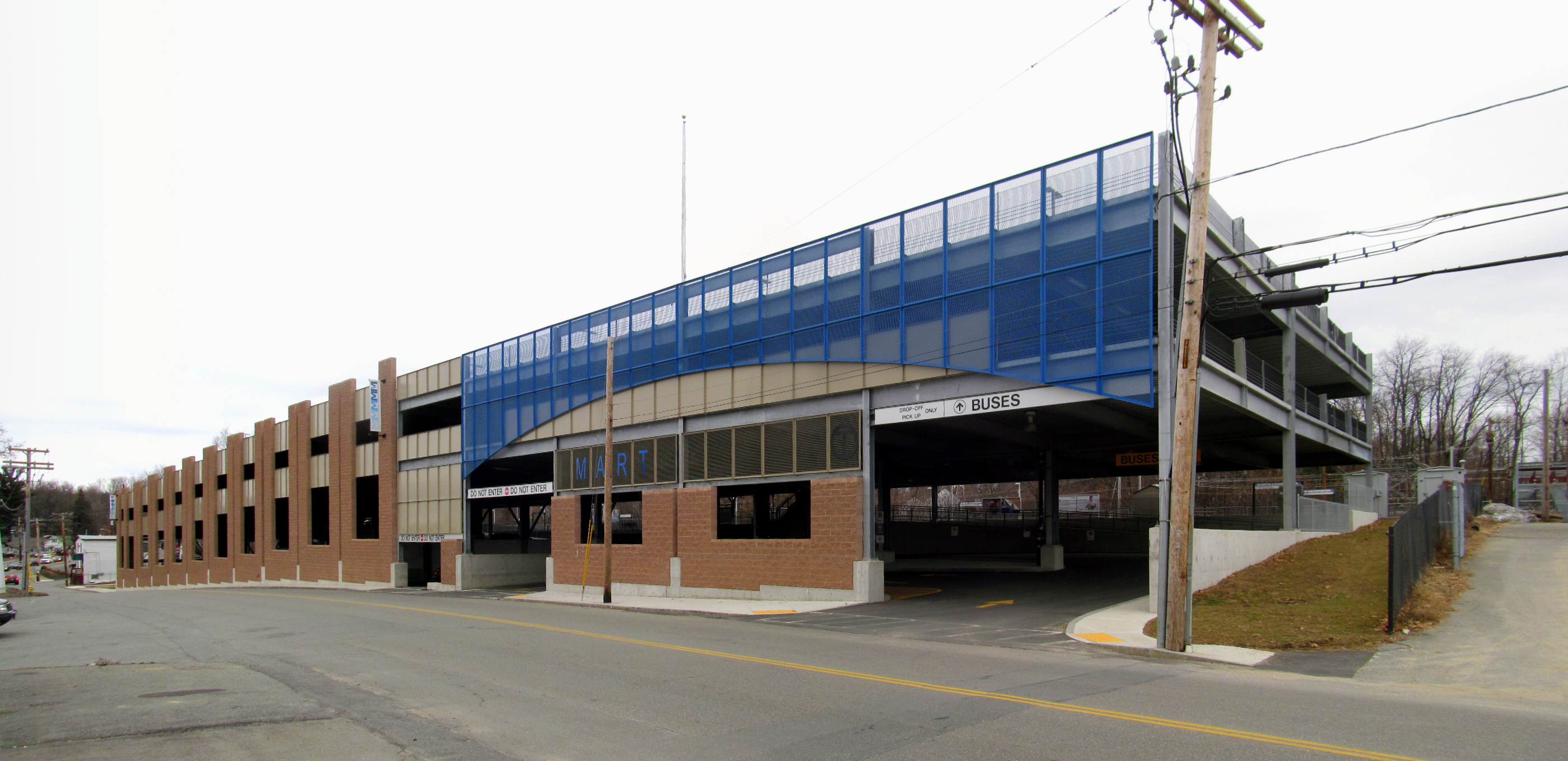
The completed garage in December 2014

Located just off Route 2, the North Leominster station was often crowded for commuter parking spaces. After 5 years of planning, construction began in March 2012 on a three-story garage which provides 340 parking spaces. The $7.7 million project, which was funded by the FTA through earmarks and formula funding, includes a covered busway and charging stations for electric cars. Originally to be completed in August 2013, the garage was delayed due to high summer heat which prevented pouring concrete as well as contractor's financial problems. The garage opened on May 20, 2014.

Construction of full-length high-level accessible platforms was considered as part of the project, but the platforms would have cost an additional $18 million and created clearance issues with passing Pan Am freight trains. The freight trains, which are slightly wider than standard passenger cars, frequently impact the mini-high platforms and would cause severe damage to full-length platforms.

===== Double tracking =====
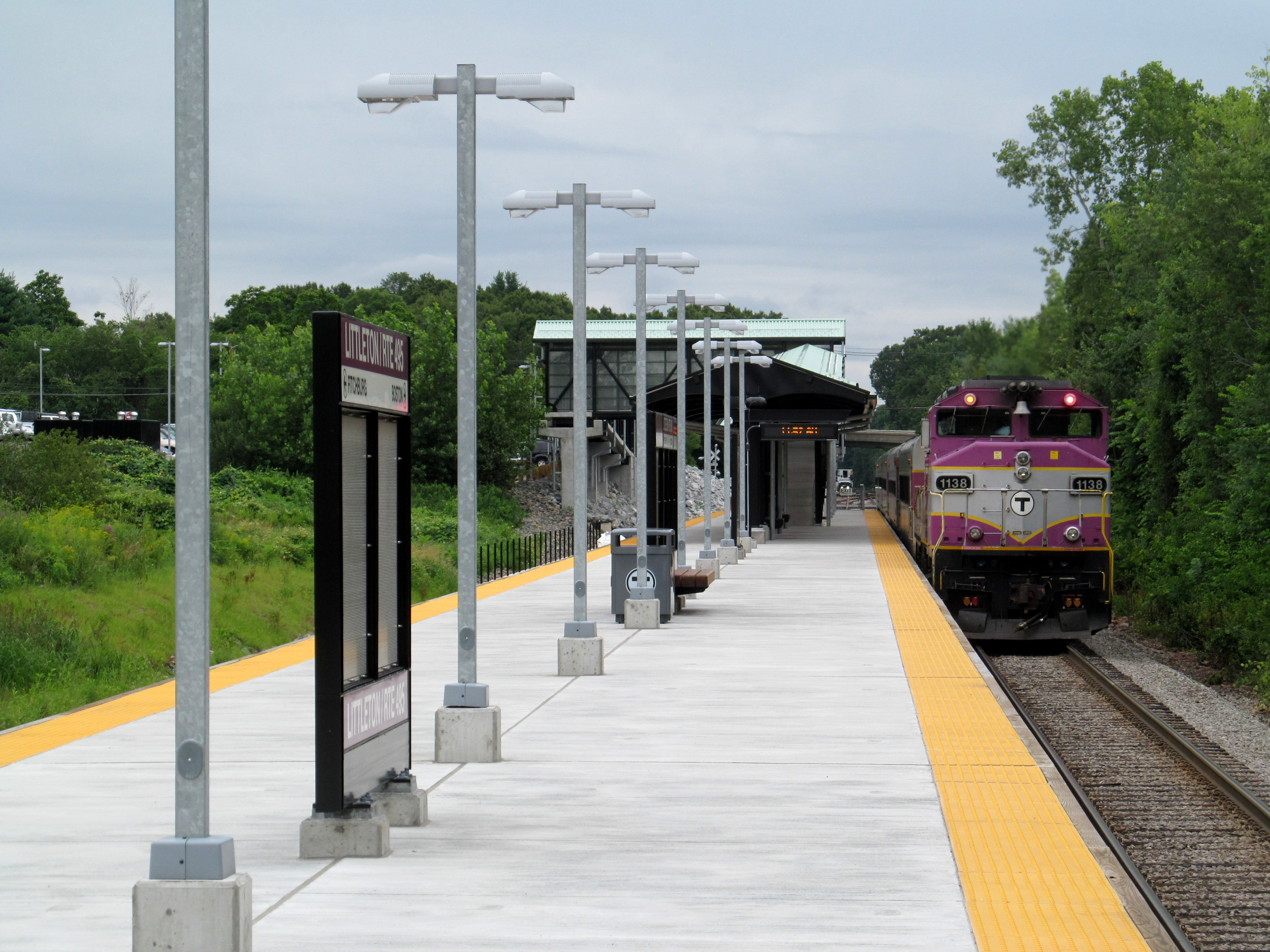
Littleton station shortly after it was rebuilt

$43 million ($40 million in ARRA funds and $3 million from the state Executive Office of Housing and Economic Development) provided for the restoration of 8 miles (13 km) of double track from Central Street in West Acton to Willows Junction in Ayer. This leaves a short section in Waltham as the only single-track section of the line. Like many of the outer stations on the line, Littleton/Route 495 was built in 1980 with a bare low-level concrete platform (not accessible for handicapped riders) serving a single track. Beginning in early 2012, it was rebuilt with a full-length island platform serving the original track and a new second track.

The new station opened in June 2013. In August 2014, with the double tracking nearly complete, all South Acton short turns were extended to Littleton. The double tracking work, including 8 grade crossing replacements and a new interlocking just east of Littleton station, was completed in November 2014.

===== Small Starts funding =====
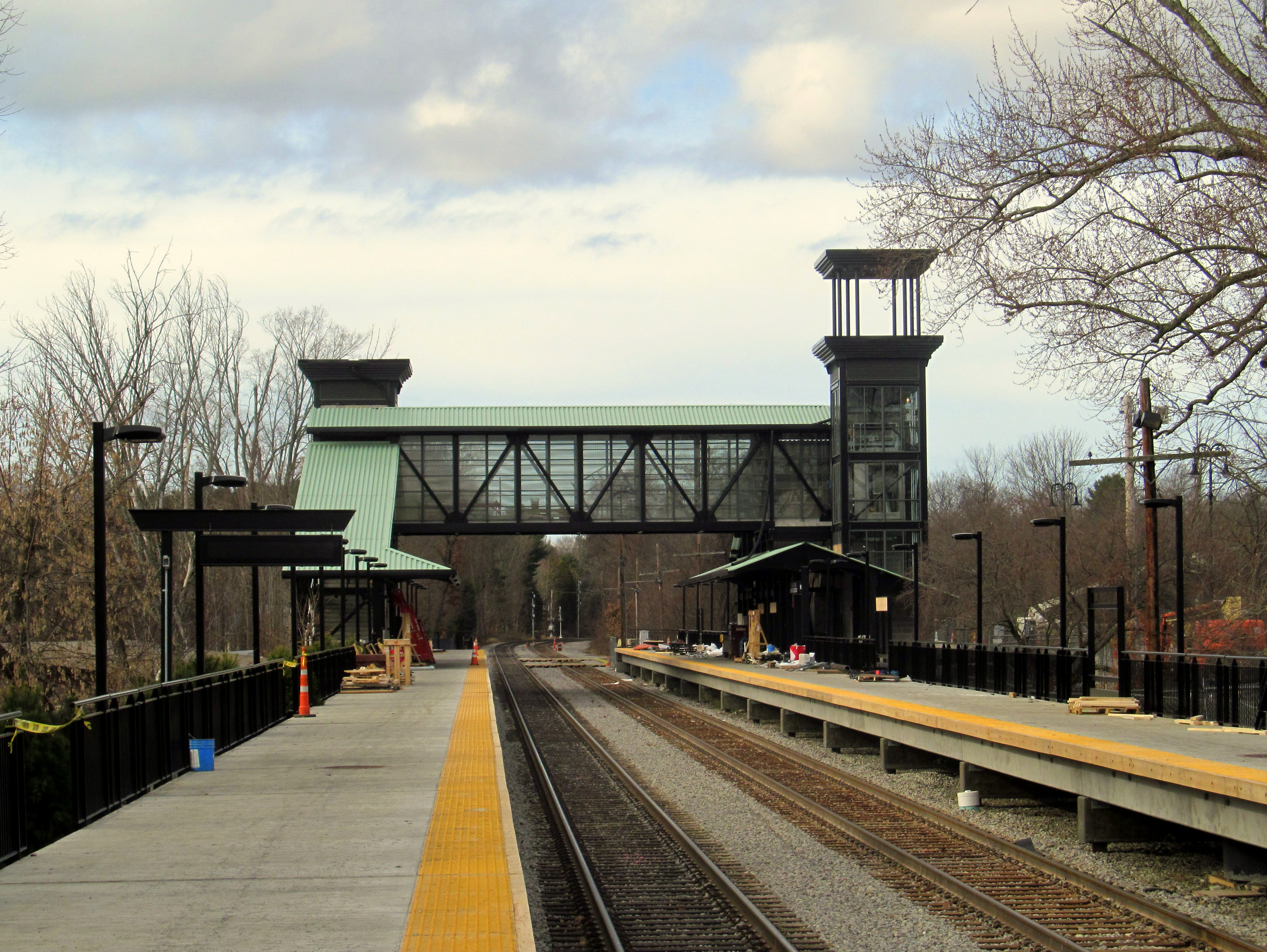
South Acton station near completion in November 2015

The largest piece of the project, funded by a total of $172 million in state money and Federal Transit Administration "Small Starts" funding, involved incremental improvements to existing infrastructure. Work started in 2012 and was largely completed by the end of 2015.

South Acton station is the busiest station on the line, with 902 daily riders by a 2013 count. Like Littleton, it formerly had a single low-level platform. After significant design changes based on community input, construction started on a new station with two full-length high-level side platforms in September 2012. The new station opened on December 21, 2015, with some minor work lasting into June 2016. An additional 1.7 miles (2.7 km) of double track was installed through the station, filling the gap between the separately funded double tracking to the west and previously existing double track to the east.

Previously, the section of the line east of Acton had an older signalling system which permitted operations in one direction on each track, which prevented express trains from passing locals and limited schedule density. Fiber optic cable was installed over this segment and new signals installed to permit full bidirectional operation. The double-tracked section west of Willows, which already had bidirectional signalling to permit passenger and slower freight trains to mix, received incremental upgrades. The new signals, along with concurrent track work, allowed maximum speeds on the line to increase from 60 miles per hour (97 km/h) to 80 miles per hour (130 km/h), with a faster schedule implemented on May 23, 2016.

Seven bridges were replaced or significantly repaired, including one over Route 62 in Concord which was a late addition to the project. Thirteen grade crossings were replaced, nine interlockings built new or improved, and dispatching of some segments transferred from the outdated tower at Waltham to the MBTA's control center. A new freight crossover was added at Ayer, with the East Main Street bridge undercut to increase clearances.

===== Wachusett extension =====
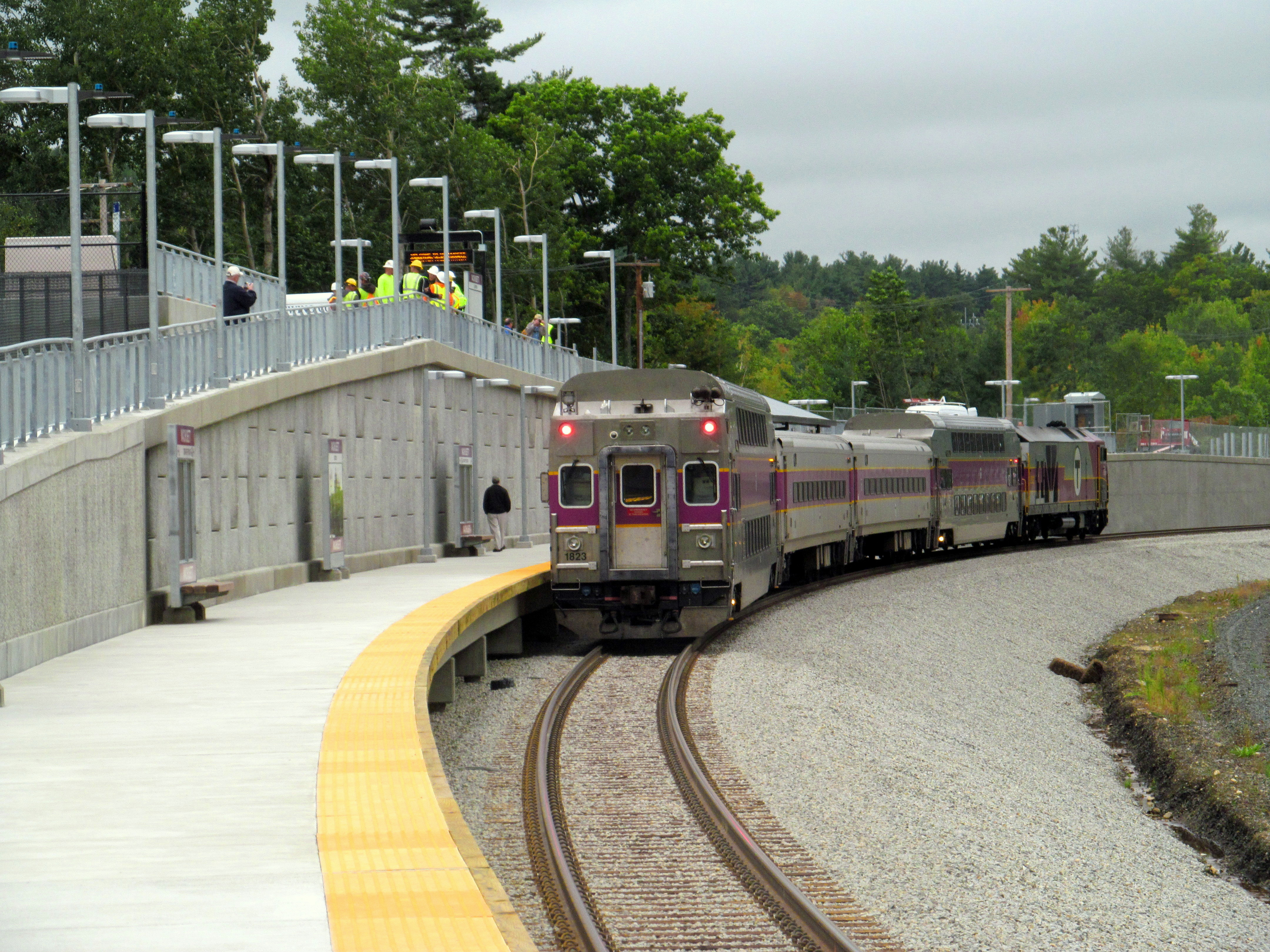
First revenue train at Wachusett station in September 2016

Per the recommendations of the mid-2000s studies, the line was extended 4.5 miles (7.2 km) west of Fitchburg to a new Wachusett park-and-ride station. The work was funded by a $55 million federal TIGER grant awarded in 2010, plus $19 million in state money. Construction started in mid-2013, and the station opened for limited service on September 30, 2016, to satisfy the terms of the federal grant.

Funded by the same grant was a new layover yard in Westminster, just west of the new station, which replaced a smaller yard in East Fitchburg. The town of Westminster opposed the project due to noise pollution issues, and filed complaints about the MBTA alleging that proper permits had not been obtained and that the agency had misled the town about construction delays. Construction was eventually allowed to proceed; the layover yard opened on November 21, 2016, along with full service to Wachusett station.

===== Weekend service curtailments =====
Work like laying track, connecting switches, and testing new signals was difficult or impossible to perform during regular daily service. In order to accommodate this work, during 2013 through 2015 service was curtailed on weekends when ridership is significantly lower. Full service was operated during winter months, when snowy weather may make driving a less palatable alternative. In 2013, weekend service was cut back to South Acton from June through August and to Brandeis/Roberts from September to November. In 2014, it was cut back to Brandeis/Roberts from late April to July, and discontinued entirely until November. In 2015, weekend service was discontinued from April 25 to November 22 except on holiday weekends.

=== COVID-19 pandemic ===
Substantially reduced schedules were in effect from March 16 to June 23, 2020. In November 2020, as part of service cuts during the pandemic, the MBTA proposed to close Hastings, Silver Hill, and four other low-ridership stations on other lines. On December 14, reduced schedules went into effect due to limited employee availability. Again based on the existing Saturday service, these temporary schedules did not include service to Hastings and four other stations. That day, the MBTA Board voted to enact a more limited set of cuts, including indefinitely closing Hastings, Silver Hill, and three of the other four stations.

On January 23, 2021, reduced schedules went into place with no weekend service on seven lines, including the Fitchburg Line. All service east of Littleton/Route 495 was replaced by Littleton–Alewife shuttle buses from March 1 to May 2, 2021, during positive train control installation. Upon resumption on May 3, weekday service on the line was changed to a regional rail model with hourly service all day. Weekend service on the Fitchburg Line and the six other lines resumed on July 3, 2021. As of May 2022, the line has 15 Boston–Wachusett round trips and two Boston–Littleton round trips on weekdays, with eight Boston–Wachusett round trips on weekends. By October 2022, the line had 4,829 daily riders – 52% of pre-COVID ridership. This increased to 6,388 daily boardings by 2024.

Weekend ski train service resumed on December 17, 2022, after not operating for the 2021–22 season; a Wednesday evening ski train for night skiing began operating on January 4, 2023. On September 11, 2023, flash floods in Leominster washed out an embankment near North Leominster station. Service between Shirley and Wachusett was replaced with buses until September 19. Additional weekday short turn service was operated between Porter and North Station from July 15–26, 2024, providing half-hour headways between those points while the Red Line was closed for maintenance work. Silver Hill station reopened on November 18, 2024.

=== Future development ===
The MBTA has unsuccessfully attempted to sell air rights for development over the tracks along Somerville Ave, near Porter station. Air rights development has also been proposed along with a new commuter rail station for the tracks near Alewife station. The city of Cambridge wants to put a pedestrian and bicycle bridge over the tracks in this area to connect the two relatively isolated areas on either side, known as the Alewife Triangle part of North Cambridge and the Quadrangle in Cambridge Highlands.

In June 2022, the MBTA indicated plans to begin short turn service on 30-minute headways between Boston and Brandeis/Roberts or Lincoln by 2024. A tail track to support this service, estimated to cost $6–7 million, was in planning.

== Trackage ==
The MBTA owns all track between Boston and Fitchburg. Pan Am Railways owns the track between Fitchburg and Wachusett, and the rest of the former Fitchburg Railroad all the way to Rotterdam, New York, as part of their main line between Rotterdam and Mattawamkeag, Maine. From Fitchburg to the old Stony Brook Railroad (which joins at Willows, east of Ayer), Pan Am runs both through freights to Lowell and beyond and Fitchburg-based locals; there is no regular freight service on the line east of Willows.

The Walden Street Cattle Pass crosses beneath the Walden Street bridge in Cambridge, adjacent to the tracks; it was last used in the 1920s.

The Union Square Branch of the Green Line Extension shares the right-of-way of the Fitchburg Line from the Inner Belt area to Union Square station. The station opened on March 21, 2022.

A portion of the Mass Central Rail Trail is planned to parallel the Fitchburg Line from Linden Street in Waltham to Brighton Street in Belmont, using the abandoned Central Massachusetts Railroad right-of-way.

== Station listing ==
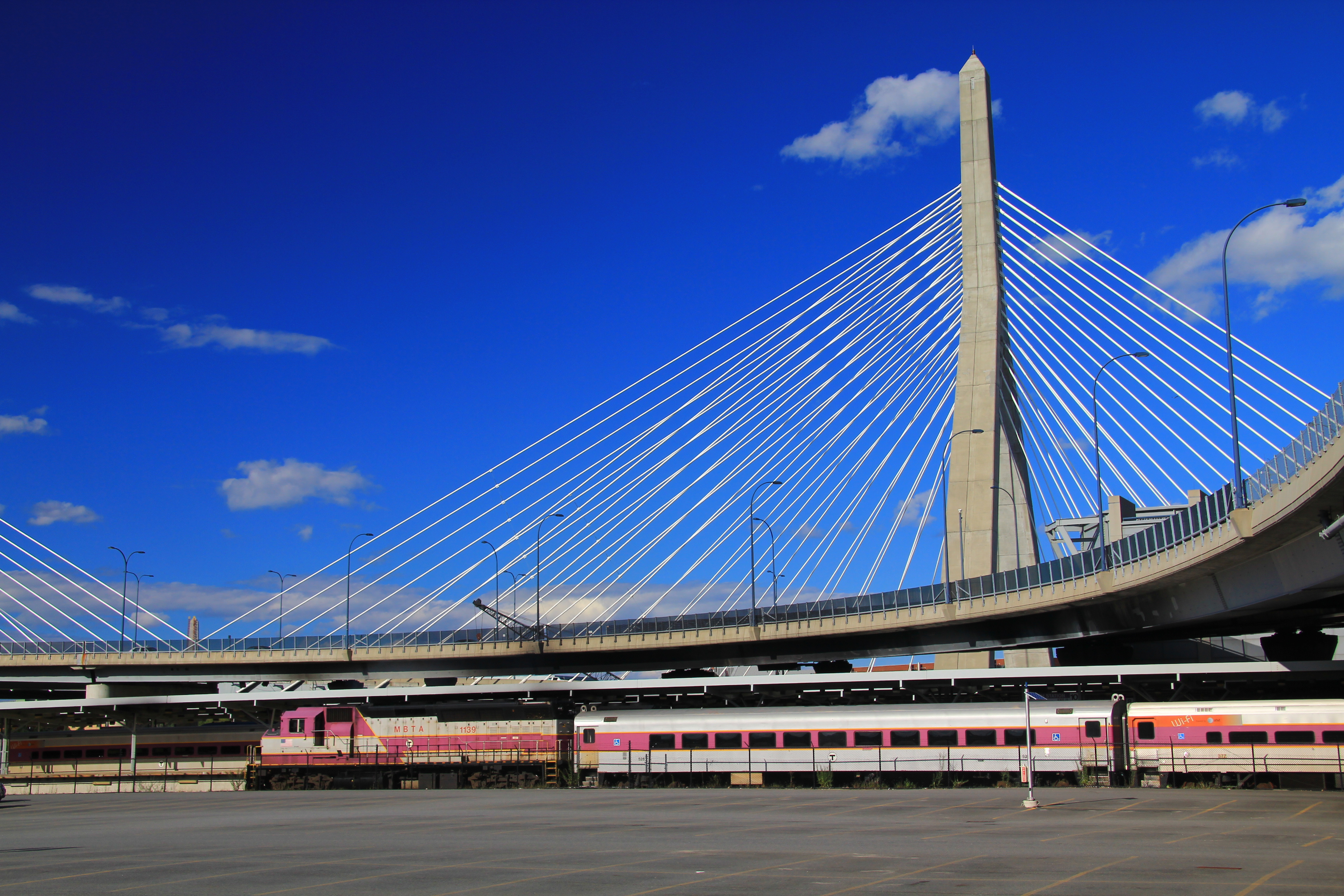
A train at North Station, the inbound terminus of the line

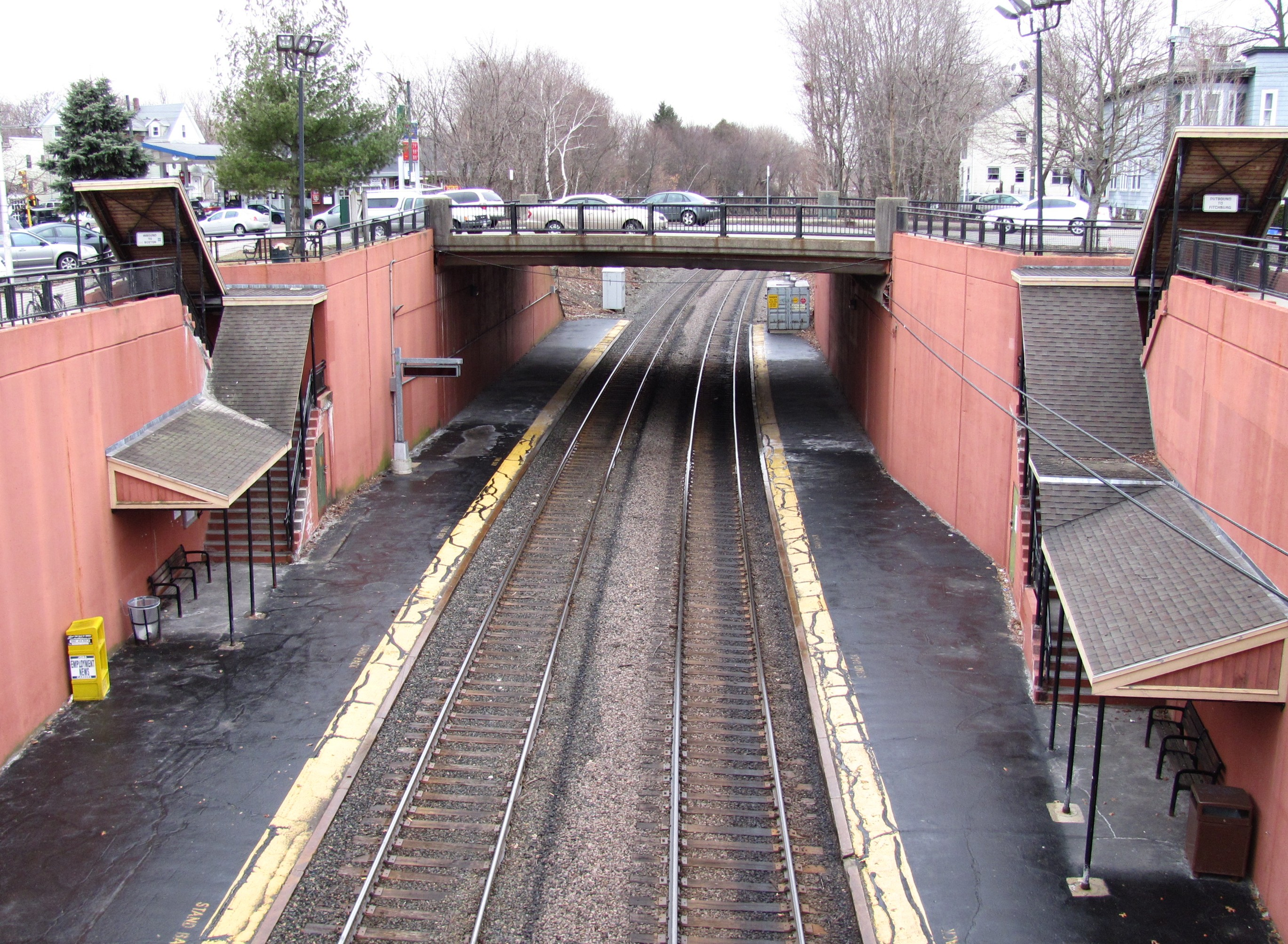
Waverley station

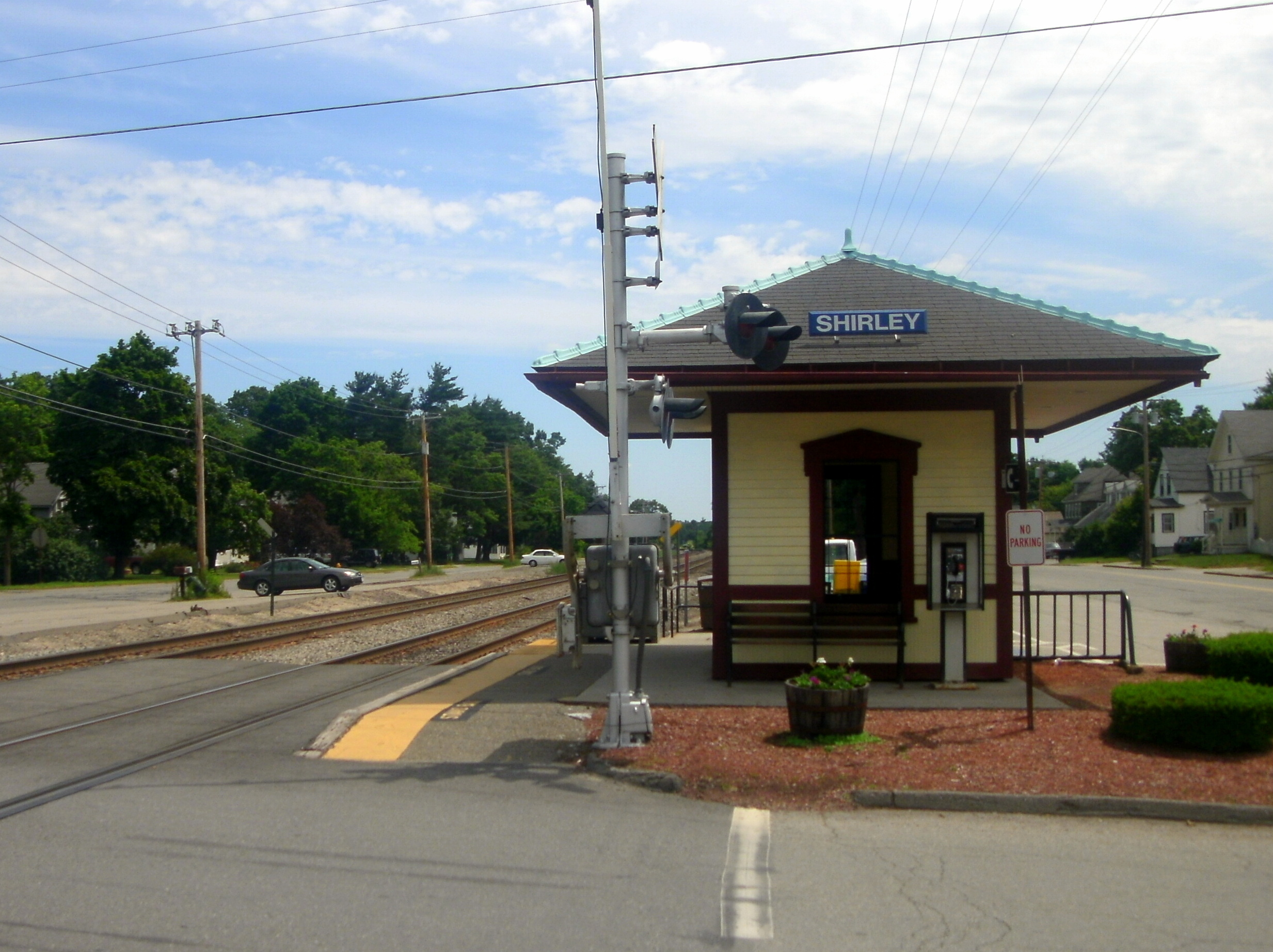
The tiny station building at Shirley

Fare zone	Location	Miles (km)	Station	Connections and notes
1A	Boston	0.0 (0.0)	North Station	Amtrak: Downeaster; MBTA Commuter Rail: Lowell Line, Haverhill Line, Newburyport/Rockport Line; MBTA subway: Orange Line, Green Line (D and E branches); MBTA bus: 4 EZRide; MBTA ferry: F10; Seaport Ferry
1A	Somerville	0.7 (1.1)	Boston Engine Terminal	Flag stop for MBTA employees only
1A	Cambridge	3.4 (5.5)	Porter	MBTA subway: Red Line; MBTA bus: 77, 83, 96
1	Belmont	6.4 (10.3)	Belmont Center	MBTA bus: 74, 75
1	Belmont	7.4 (11.9)	Waverley	MBTA bus: 73, 554
1	Waltham	8.3 (13.4)	Clematis Brook	Closed in June 1978. Former junction with the Central Mass Branch, on which passenger service ended in 1971
	Waltham	9.3 (15.0)	Beaver Brook	Closed in June 1978
2	Waltham	9.9 (15.9)	Waltham	MBTA bus: 61, 70, 553, 554, 556, 558; 128 Business Council: W1
2	Waltham	10.6 (17.1)	Riverview	Closed January 17, 1965
2	Waltham	11.5 (18.5)	Brandeis/Roberts	MBTA bus: 553
3	Weston	13.2 (21.2)	Kendal Green	
3	Weston	13.7 (22.0)	Hastings	Indefinitely closed December 14, 2020
3	Weston	14.7 (23.7)	Silver Hill	
4	Lincoln	16.7 (26.9)	Lincoln	
5	Concord	20.1 (32.3)	Concord	
5	Concord	21.9 (35.2)	West Concord	
6	Acton	25.3 (40.7)	South Acton	Boxborough Connects, Cross Acton Transit; MWRTA: 495
	Acton	26.8 (43.1)	West Acton	Closed March 1, 1975
7	Littleton	30.1 (48.4)	Littleton/Route 495	MART: Harvard Commuter Shuttle
7	Littleton	31.5 (50.7)	Littleton	Closed March 1, 1975
8	Ayer	36.1 (58.1)	Ayer	
8	Shirley	39.4 (63.4)	Shirley	
8	Leominster	45.1 (72.6)	North Leominster	MART: 1, 3
8	Fitchburg	49.6 (79.8)	Fitchburg	MART: Worcester Commuter, Intercity/MWCC, Fitchburg–Leominster Route 2 Express, Wachusett Commuter Shuttle, 1, 2, 3, 4, 5, 6, 7, 11
8	Fitchburg	53.7 (86.4)	Wachusett	MART: Wachusett Commuter Shuttle, 11; Wachusett Mountain shuttle (winter)
	Gardner	64.9 (104.4)	Gardner	Closed January 1, 1987
Closed station
