= Lincoln station (MBTA) =

Railway station in Lincoln, Massachusetts

Lincoln
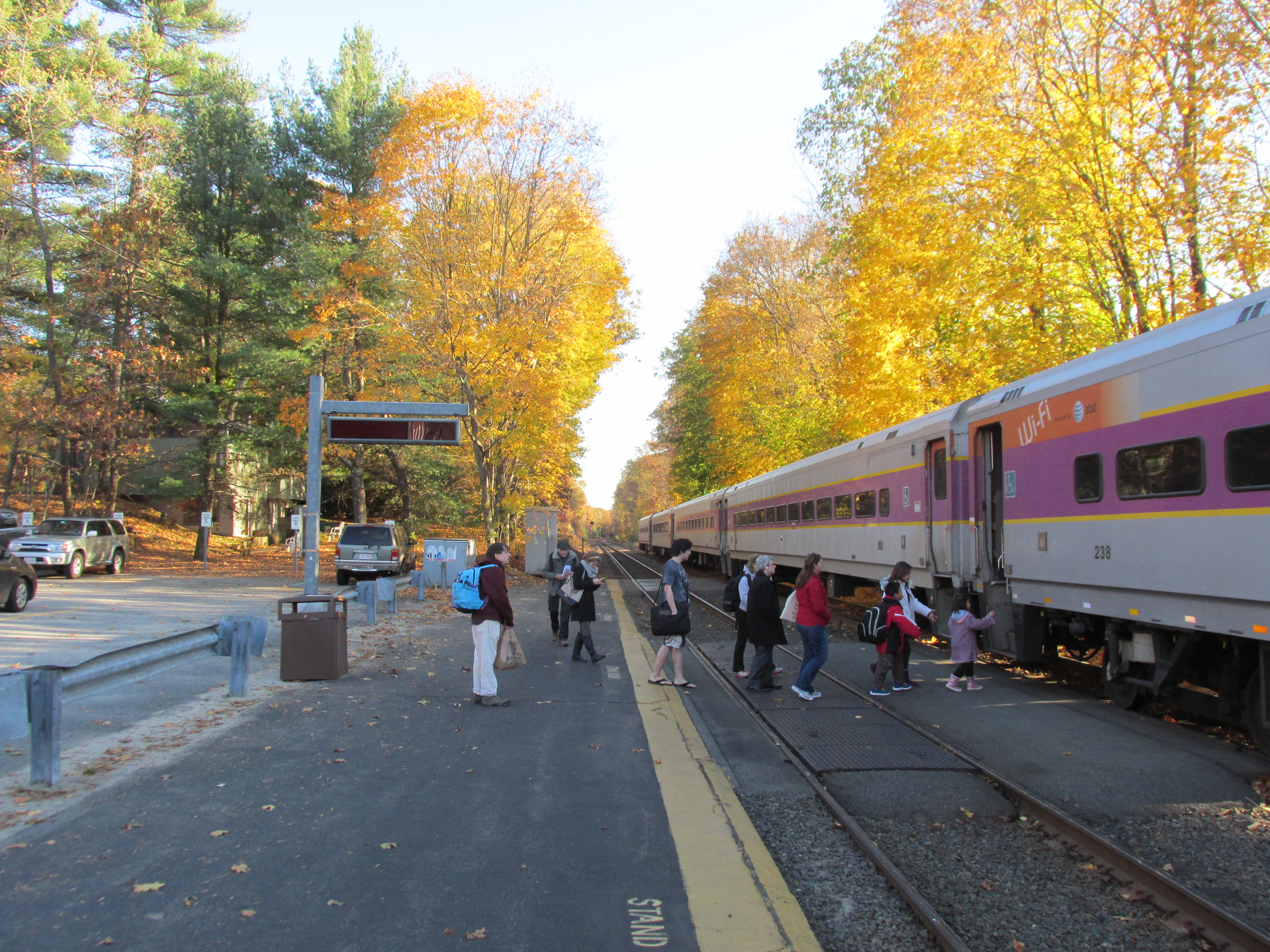
- Passengers board an inbound train at Lincoln

General information
- Location: 160 Lincoln Road; Lincoln, Massachusetts
- Coordinates: 42°24′50.53″N 71°19′33.19″W
- Line: Fitchburg Route
- Platforms: 2 side platforms
- Tracks: 2

Construction
- Parking: 161 spaces ($3.00 fee)
- Cycle facilities: 21 spaces
- Accessible: No

Other information
- Fare zone: 4

History
- Former names: South Lincoln

Passengers
- 2024: 149 daily boardings

Services
| Preceding station | MBTA | Following station |
|---|---|---|
| Concord toward Wachusett | Fitchburg Line | Silver Hill toward North Station |
Location

Lincoln station is an MBTA Commuter Rail in Lincoln, Massachusetts, served by the Fitchburg Line. The station has two side platforms, both adjacent to the outbound track but on opposite sides of the Lincoln Road grade crossing. Outbound trains stop at the north platform, while inbound trains stop opposite the south platform and passengers use two asphalt crossings to board. The configuration was made to minimize the number of stopped trains that block Lincoln Road, as the town emergency services are based nearby and Lincoln Road is the most direct route to the town center. Both platforms are low-level; Lincoln station is not accessible.

== History ==
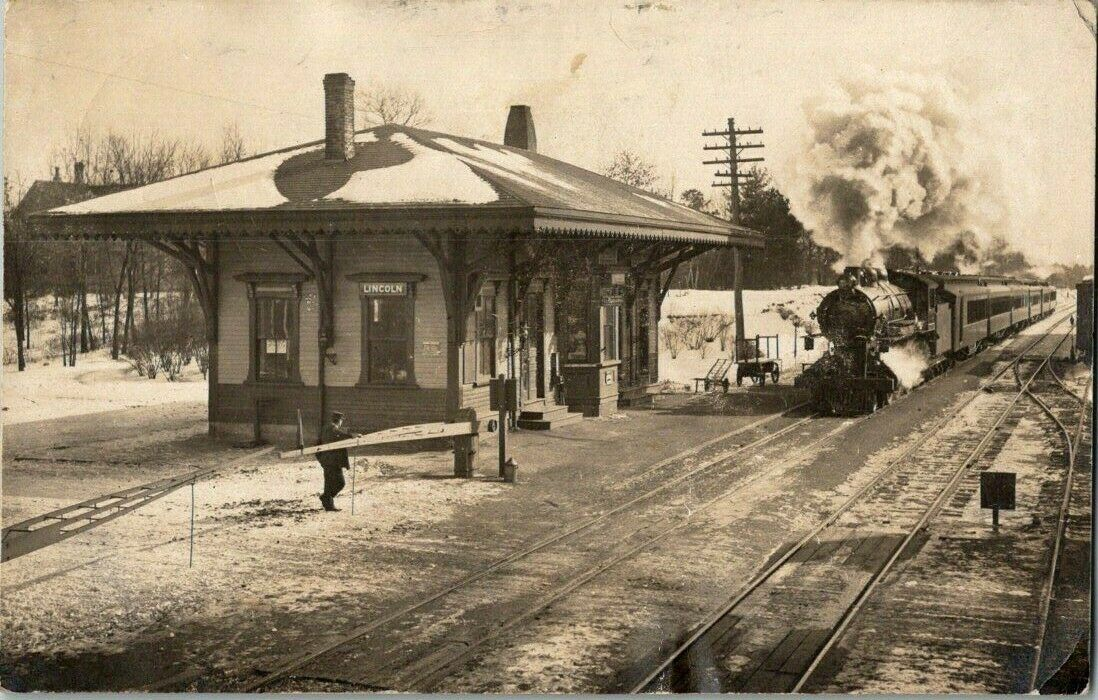
1910 postcard of Lincoln station

There has been continuous commuter service to Lincoln since the station stop was established before 1850. A station building formerly stood on the outbound side; it was demolished by 1962.

In 2024, the MBTA tested a temporary freestanding accessible platform design at Beverly Depot. These platforms do not require alterations to the existing platforms, thus skirting federal rules requiring full accessibility renovations when stations are modified, and were intended to provide interim accessibility at lower cost pending full reconstruction. Lincoln is planned to be part of the second set of non-accessible stations to be modified with the temporary platforms. Funding for design and construction came from Fair Share Amendment revenues. Design work began in the first half of 2024. As of May 2026, design work is still underway; the accessible platforms at Lincoln are expected to be completed in 2027.
