= List of MBTA Commuter Rail stations =

Geographic and stylized maps of the MBTA Commuter Rail system

MBTA Commuter Rail is the commuter rail system for the Greater Boston metropolitan area of Massachusetts. It is owned by the Massachusetts Bay Transportation Authority (MBTA) and operated under contract by Keolis. In 2022, it was the fifth-busiest commuter rail system in the United States with an average weekday ridership of 78,800. The system's routes span 429 miles (690 km) and cover roughly the eastern third of Massachusetts plus central Rhode Island. They stretch from Newburyport in the north to North Kingstown, Rhode Island, in the south, and reach as far west as Worcester and Fitchburg. The system is split into two parts, with lines north of Boston having a terminus at North Station and lines south of Boston having a terminus at South Station.

As of July 2025, there are 143 active stations on twelve lines, four of which have branches. 122 active stations are accessible, including all terminals and all stations with rapid transit connections; 21 are not. Five additional stations (Prides Crossing, Mishawum, Hastings, Plimptonville, and Plymouth) are indefinitely closed due to service cuts during the COVID-19 pandemic. Several other stations are planned.

The MBTA was formed in 1964 to subsidize suburban commuter rail service operated by the Boston and Maine Railroad, New York Central Railroad, and New York, New Haven and Hartford Railroad. Subsidies began in stages from 1965 to 1973; a number of stations closed in 1965–1967 before service to them was subsidized, of which 26 have not reopened. Contraction continued into the early 1980s; 42 additional stations closed between 1967 and 1981 have not reopened. Expansion of the system began in the late 1970s, including extensions of existing lines and the reopening of several lines discontinued before the MBTA era. Three additional low-ridership stations have closed since 1981, while several other stations have been relocated.

== Key ==
| Station | Indicates the MBTA's official name for the station. |
| Disabled access | Indicates whether the station is accessible. (See MBTA accessibility for further details.) |
| Line | Indicates the lines that stop at the given station. A bold line designation indicates that the station is a terminus for that line. |
| Connections | Denotes any links to MBTA subway and MBTA bus routes, to other bus systems, to Amtrak trains, or to the CapeFLYER at the station. |
| City/neighborhood | Identifies the municipality (and for Boston, the neighborhood) in which the station is located. |
| Fare zone | Identifies which of the eleven fare zones the station is in. The zones are 1A, 1, 2, 3, 4, 5, 6, 7, 8, 9, and 10, with Zone 1A being the closest to North Station and South Station, and Zone 10 being the farthest. |
| Daily boardings | Average daily boardings (in both directions) from a Fall 2024 count. |
| Station info | A link to the station's information page on the MBTA website. |

== Stations ==
| Station | Disabled access | Line | Connections | City/neighborhood | Fare zone | Daily boardings | Station info |
|---|---|---|---|---|---|---|---|
| South Station | Disabled access | Framingham/Worcester Line; Needham Line; Franklin/Foxboro Line; Providence/Stoughton Line; Fairmount Line; Greenbush Line; Fall River/New Bedford Line; Kingston Line | Amtrak: Acela, Lake Shore Limited, Northeast Regional; CapeFLYER; MBTA subway: Red Line, Silver Line; MBTA bus: 4, 7, 11; Intercity buses at South Station Bus Terminal | Boston/Downtown | 1A | 22,467 | Link |
| JFK/UMass | Disabled access | Greenbush Line; Fall River/New Bedford Line; Kingston Line | MBTA subway: Red Line; MBTA bus: 8, 16, 41 | Boston/Dorchester | 1A | 1,095 | Link |
| Quincy Center | Disabled access | Greenbush Line; Fall River/New Bedford Line; Kingston Line | MBTA subway: Red Line; MBTA bus: 210, 211, 215, 216, 217, 220, 222, 225, 230, 236, 238, 245 | Quincy | 1 | 801 | Link |
| Weymouth Landing/East Braintree | Disabled access | Greenbush Line | MBTA bus: 225, 226 | Weymouth | 2 | 364 | Link |
| East Weymouth | Disabled access | Greenbush Line | – | Weymouth | 2 | 320 | Link |
| West Hingham | Disabled access | Greenbush Line | — | Hingham | 3 | 167 | Link |
| Nantasket Junction | Disabled access | Greenbush Line | MBTA bus: 714 | Hingham | 4 | 120 | Link |
| Cohasset | Disabled access | Greenbush Line | — | Cohasset | 4 | 133 | Link |
| North Scituate | Disabled access | Greenbush Line | — | Scituate | 5 | 153 | Link |
| Greenbush | Disabled access | Greenbush Line | – | Scituate | 6 | 425 | Link |
| Braintree | Disabled access | Kingston Line; Fall River/New Bedford Line | CapeFLYER; MBTA subway: Red Line; MBTA bus: 226, 230, 236 | Braintree | 2 | 538 | Link |
| South Weymouth | Disabled access | Kingston Line | — | Weymouth | 3 | 515 | Link |
| Abington | Disabled access | Kingston Line | — | Abington | 4 | 376 | Link |
| Whitman | Disabled access | Kingston Line | — | Whitman | 5 | 239 | Link |
| Hanson | Disabled access | Kingston Line | — | Hanson | 6 | 182 | Link |
| Halifax | Disabled access | Kingston Line | — | Halifax | 7 | 146 | Link |
| Kingston | Disabled access | Kingston Line | GATRA: Freedom Link, Liberty Link, SAIL | Kingston | 8 | 634 | Link |
| Plymouth | Disabled access | Kingston Line | GATRA: Freedom Link, Liberty Link | Plymouth | 8 | – | Link |
| Holbrook/Randolph | Disabled access | Fall River/New Bedford Line | MBTA bus: 238, 240 | Randolph | 3 | 406 | Link |
| Montello | Disabled access | Fall River/New Bedford Line | MBTA bus: 230; BAT: 10/11 | Brockton | 4 | 467 | Link |
| Brockton | Disabled access | Fall River/New Bedford Line | CapeFLYER; BAT: 1, 2, 3, 4, 4A, 5, 6, 8, 9, 10/11, 12, 13, 14, BSU 28; GATRA: Gateway Link | Brockton | 4 | 560 | Link |
| Campello | Disabled access | Fall River/New Bedford Line | BAT: 8, 12 | Brockton | 5 | 357 | Link |
| Bridgewater | Disabled access | Fall River/New Bedford Line | — | Bridgewater | 6 | 529 | Link |
| Middleborough | Disabled access | Fall River/New Bedford Line | GATRA: Downtown Middleborough Shuttle, Link 4 | Middleborough | 8 | – | Link |
| East Taunton | Disabled access | Fall River/New Bedford Line | GATRA | East Taunton | 8 | – | Link |
| Freetown | Disabled access | Fall River/New Bedford Line | — | Freetown | 8 | – | Link |
| Fall River | Disabled access | Fall River/New Bedford Line | SRTA: 102 | Fall River | 8 | – | Link |
| Church Street | Disabled access | Fall River/New Bedford Line | — | New Bedford | 8 | – | Link |
| New Bedford | Disabled access | Fall River/New Bedford Line | SRTA: 202, 204, 211 | New Bedford | 8 | – | Link |
| Newmarket | Disabled access | Fairmount Line | MBTA bus: 8, 10 | Boston/Dorchester | 1A | 191 | Link |
| Uphams Corner | Disabled access | Fairmount Line | MBTA bus: 15, 41 | Boston/Dorchester | 1A | 364 | Link |
| Four Corners/Geneva | Disabled access | Fairmount Line | MBTA bus: 19, 23 | Boston/Dorchester | 1A | 424 | Link |
| Talbot Avenue | Disabled access | Fairmount Line | MBTA bus: 22 | Boston/Dorchester | 1A | 427 | Link |
| Morton Street | Disabled access | Fairmount Line | MBTA bus: 21, 26 | Boston/Mattapan | 1A | 427 | Link |
| Blue Hill Avenue | Disabled access | Fairmount Line | MBTA bus: 28, 29, 30, 31 | Boston/Mattapan | 1A | 419 | Link |
| Fairmount | Disabled access | Fairmount Line | MBTA bus: 24, 33 | Boston/Hyde Park | 1A | 528 | Link |
| Readville | Disabled access | Fairmount Line; Franklin/Foxboro Line | MBTA bus: 32, 33 | Boston/Hyde Park | 2 | 826 | Link |
| Back Bay | Disabled access | Framingham/Worcester Line; Franklin/Foxboro Line; Needham Line; Providence/Stoughton Line | Amtrak: Acela, Lake Shore Limited, Northeast Regional; MBTA subway: Orange Line; MBTA bus: 10, 39; Intercity buses at Copley Square | Boston/Back Bay | 1A | 6,786 | Link |
| Ruggles | Disabled access | Franklin/Foxboro Line; Needham Line; Providence/Stoughton Line | MBTA subway: Orange Line; MBTA bus: 8, 15, 19, 22, 23, 28, 43, 44, 45, 47, 85, CT3; Mission Hill Link | Boston/Roxbury Crossing | 1A | 3,166 | Link |
| Forest Hills | Disabled access | Franklin/Foxboro Line; Needham Line; Providence/Stoughton Line | MBTA subway: Orange Line; MBTA bus: 16, 21, 30, 31, 32, 34, 34E, 35, 36, 37, 38, 39, 40, 42, 50, 51 | Boston/Jamaica Plain | 1A | 521 | Link |
| Hyde Park | Disabled access | Franklin/Foxboro Line; Providence/Stoughton Line | MBTA bus: 24, 32, 33, 50 | Boston/Hyde Park | 1 | 435 | Link |
| Route 128 | Disabled access | Providence/Stoughton Line | Amtrak: Acela, Northeast Regional | Westwood | 2 | 1,016 | Link |
| Canton Junction | Disabled access | Providence/Stoughton Line | MBTA bus: 716 | Canton | 3 | 1,105 | Link |
| Canton Center | Disabled access | Providence/Stoughton Line | MBTA bus: 716 | Canton | 3 | 334 | Link |
| Stoughton | Disabled access | Providence/Stoughton Line | BAT: 14 | Stoughton | 4 | 766 | Link |
| Sharon | Disabled access | Providence/Stoughton Line | — | Sharon | 4 | 756 | Link |
| Mansfield | Disabled access | Providence/Stoughton Line | Blue Apple Bus | Mansfield | 6 | 1,143 | Link |
| Attleboro | Disabled access | Providence/Stoughton Line | GATRA: 10, 12, 15, 16, 18 | Attleboro | 7 | 1,220 | Link |
| South Attleboro | Disabled access | Providence/Stoughton Line | GATRA: 11, 16; RIPTA: 1, 35 | Attleboro | 7 | 19 | Link |
| Pawtucket/Central Falls | Disabled access | Providence/Stoughton Line | RIPTA: R-Line, 1, 71, 72, 73, 75, 76, 78, 80, QX | Pawtucket, RI | 8 | 658 | Link |
| Providence | Disabled access | Providence/Stoughton Line | Amtrak: Acela, Northeast Regional; RIPTA: R-Line, 3, 4, 50, 51, 54, 55, 56, 57, 58, 66, 72; Amtrak Thruway | Providence, RI | 8 | 1,462 | Link |
| T. F. Green Airport | Disabled access | Providence/Stoughton Line | RIPTA: 14 | Warwick, RI | 9 | 124 | Link |
| Wickford Junction | Disabled access | Providence/Stoughton Line | RIPTA: 14, 65x, 66 | North Kingstown, RI | 10 | 157 | Link |
| Endicott | | Franklin/Foxboro Line | — | Dedham | 2 | 297 | Link |
| Dedham Corporate Center | Disabled access | Franklin/Foxboro Line | — | Dedham | 2 | 437 | Link |
| Islington | | Franklin/Foxboro Line | — | Westwood | 3 | 166 | Link |
| Norwood Depot | Disabled access | Franklin/Foxboro Line | — | Norwood | 3 | 451 | Link |
| Norwood Central | Disabled access | Franklin/Foxboro Line | — | Norwood | 3 | 624 | Link |
| Windsor Gardens | | Franklin/Foxboro Line | — | Norwood | 4 | 228 | Link |
| Plimptonville | | Franklin/Foxboro Line | — | Walpole | 4 | – | Link |
| Walpole | Disabled access | Franklin/Foxboro Line | – | Walpole | 4 | 326 | Link |
| Foxboro | Disabled access | Franklin/Foxboro Line | — | Foxborough | 4 | 150 | Link |
| Norfolk | Disabled access | Franklin/Foxboro Line | GATRA: Medway T Shuttle | Norfolk | 5 | 430 | Link |
| Franklin | Disabled access | Franklin/Foxboro Line | – | Franklin | 6 | 404 | Link |
| Forge Park/495 | Disabled access | Franklin/Foxboro Line | MWRTA: 495 Connector | Franklin | 6 | 485 | Link |
| Roslindale Village | Disabled access | Needham Line | MBTA bus: 14, 30, 34, 34E, 35, 36, 37, 40, 50, 51 | Boston/Roslindale | 1 | 517 | Link |
| Bellevue | Disabled access | Needham Line | MBTA bus: 35, 36, 37, 38 | Boston/West Roxbury | 1 | 319 | Link |
| Highland | Disabled access | Needham Line | MBTA bus: 35, 36, 37 | Boston/West Roxbury | 1 | 338 | Link |
| West Roxbury | Disabled access | Needham Line | MBTA bus: 35, 36, 37 | Boston/West Roxbury | 1 | 356 | Link |
| Hersey | Disabled access | Needham Line | — | Needham | 2 | 405 | Link |
| Needham Junction | Disabled access | Needham Line | MBTA bus: 59 | Needham | 2 | 284 | Link |
| Needham Center | Disabled access | Needham Line | MBTA bus: 59 | Needham | 2 | 199 | Link |
| Needham Heights | Disabled access | Needham Line | MBTA bus: 59 | Needham | 2 | 242 | Link |
| Lansdowne | Disabled access | Framingham/Worcester Line | MBTA bus: 8, 19, 60, 65; At Kenmore: MBTA subway: Green Line (B, C, D); MBTA bus: 8, 19, 57, 60, 65 | Boston/Fenway–Kenmore | 1A | 1,348 | Link |
| Boston Landing | Disabled access | Framingham/Worcester Line | MBTA bus: 64 | Boston/Allston–Brighton | 1A | 1,266 | Link |
| Newtonville | | Framingham/Worcester Line | MBTA bus: 59, 553, 554, 556 | Newton | 1 | 421 | Link |
| West Newton | | Framingham/Worcester Line | MBTA bus: 553, 554 | Newton | 2 | 227 | Link |
| Auburndale | | Framingham/Worcester Line | – | Newton | 2 | 171 | Link |
| Wellesley Farms | | Framingham/Worcester Line | — | Wellesley | 3 | 247 | Link |
| Wellesley Hills | | Framingham/Worcester Line | — | Wellesley | 3 | 301 | Link |
| Wellesley Square | Disabled access | Framingham/Worcester Line | — | Wellesley | 3 | 470 | Link |
| Natick Center | Disabled access | Framingham/Worcester Line | MWRTA: 10, 11, Natick Commuter Shuttle, MathWorks Express Shuttle | Natick | 4 | 419 | Link |
| West Natick | Disabled access | Framingham/Worcester Line | MWRTA: 10, 11, Natick Commuter Shuttle | Natick | 4 | 533 | Link |
| Framingham | Disabled access | Framingham/Worcester Line | Amtrak: Lake Shore Limited; MWRTA: 2, 3, 4, 5, 6, 7; Greyhound | Framingham | 5 | 904 | Link |
| Ashland | Disabled access | Framingham/Worcester Line | MWRTA: 5 | Ashland | 6 | 393 | Link |
| Southborough | Disabled access | Framingham/Worcester Line | MWRTA: 495 Connector, Marlborough Commuter Shuttle | Southborough | 6 | 425 | Link |
| Westborough | Disabled access | Framingham/Worcester Line | – | Westborough | 7 | 409 | Link |
| Grafton | Disabled access | Framingham/Worcester Line | WRTA: B | Grafton | 8 | 367 | Link |
| Worcester | Disabled access | Framingham/Worcester Line | Amtrak: Lake Shore Limited; WRTA: 1, 2, 3, 4, 5, 6, 7, 11, 12, 14, 15, 16, 19, 23, 24, 26, 27, 29, 30, 31, 33, 42, 825; PVTA: B79; Greyhound, Peter Pan; Amtrak Thruway | Worcester | 8 | 1,139 | Link |
| North Station | Disabled access | Fitchburg Line; Haverhill Line; Lowell Line; Newburyport/Rockport Line | Amtrak: Downeaster; MBTA subway: Green Line, Orange Line; MBTA bus: 4; EZRide; MBTA ferry: F10 (at Lovejoy Wharf); Seaport Ferry (at Lovejoy Wharf) | Boston/Downtown | 1A | 11,186 | Link |
| Porter | Disabled access | Fitchburg Line | MBTA subway: Red Line; MBTA bus: 77, 83, 96 | Cambridge | 1A | 676 | Link |
| Belmont Center | | Fitchburg Line | MBTA bus: 74, 75 | Belmont | 1 | 163 | Link |
| Waverley | | Fitchburg Line | MBTA bus: 73, 554 | Belmont | 1 | 179 | Link |
| Waltham | Disabled access | Fitchburg Line | MBTA bus: 61, 70, 553, 554, 556, 558; 128 Business Council: W1 | Waltham | 2 | 460 | Link |
| Brandeis/Roberts | Disabled access | Fitchburg Line | MBTA bus: 553 | Waltham | 2 | 386 | Link |
| Kendal Green | | Fitchburg Line | — | Weston | 3 | 130 | Link |
| Hastings | | Fitchburg Line | — | Weston | 3 | – | Link |
| Silver Hill | | Fitchburg Line | — | Weston | 3 | – | Link |
| Lincoln | | Fitchburg Line | — | Lincoln | 4 | 149 | Link |
| Concord | | Fitchburg Line | — | Concord | 5 | 287 | Link |
| West Concord | Disabled access | Fitchburg Line | — | Concord | 5 | 263 | Link |
| South Acton | Disabled access | Fitchburg Line | Cross Acton Transit; MWRTA: 495 Connector | Acton | 6 | 463 | Link |
| Littleton/Route 495 | Disabled access | Fitchburg Line | MART: Harvard Commuter Shuttle | Littleton | 7 | 319 | Link |
| Ayer | | Fitchburg Line | – | Ayer | 8 | 190 | Link |
| Shirley | | Fitchburg Line | – | Shirley | 8 | 103 | Link |
| North Leominster | Disabled access | Fitchburg Line | MART: 1, 3, 9 | Leominster | 8 | 146 | Link |
| Fitchburg | Disabled access | Fitchburg Line | MART: Worcester Commuter, Intercity/MWCC, Fitchburg–Leominster Route 2 Express, Wachusett Commuter Shuttle, 1, 2, 3, 4, 5, 6, 7, 11 | Fitchburg | 8 | 250 | Link |
| Wachusett | Disabled access | Fitchburg Line | MART: Wachusett Commuter Shuttle, 11; Wachusett Mountain shuttle (winter) | Fitchburg | 8 | 83 | Link |
| West Medford | Disabled access | Lowell Line | MBTA bus: 94, 95 | Medford | 1A | 415 | Link |
| Wedgemere | Disabled access | Lowell Line | — | Winchester | 1 | 346 | Link |
| Winchester Center | Disabled access | Lowell Line | MBTA bus: 134 | Winchester | 1 | 115 | Link |
| Mishawum | | Lowell Line | — | Woburn | 2 | – | Link |
| Anderson/Woburn | Disabled access | Lowell Line | Amtrak: Downeaster; Logan Express | Woburn | 2 | 677 | Link |
| Wilmington | Disabled access | Lowell Line | LRTA: 12 | Wilmington | 3 | 377 | Link |
| North Billerica | Disabled access | Lowell Line | LRTA: 3, 13 | North Billerica | 5 | 604 | Link |
| Lowell | Disabled access | Lowell Line | LRTA: 1, 2, 3, 4, 5, 6, 7, 8, 9, 10, 11, 12, 13, 14, 15, 16, 17, 18, 19, 20; MVRTA: 24 | Lowell | 6 | 977 | Link |
| Malden Center | Disabled access | Haverhill Line | MBTA subway: Orange Line; MBTA bus: 97, 99, 101, 104, 105, 106, 108, 131, 132, 137, 411, 430 | Malden | 1A | 101 | Link |
| Oak Grove | Disabled access | Haverhill Line | MBTA subway: Orange Line; MBTA bus: 131, 132, 137 | Malden | 1A | 38 | Link |
| Wyoming Hill | | Haverhill Line | MBTA bus: 131, 132, 137 | Melrose | 1 | 51 | Link |
| Melrose/Cedar Park | | Haverhill Line | — | Melrose | 1 | 63 | Link |
| Melrose Highlands | Disabled access | Haverhill Line | MBTA bus: 131 | Melrose | 1 | 86 | Link |
| Greenwood | | Haverhill Line | MBTA bus: 137 | Wakefield | 2 | 77 | Link |
| Wakefield | | Haverhill Line | MBTA bus: 137 | Wakefield | 2 | 183 | Link |
| Reading | Disabled access | Haverhill Line | MBTA bus: 137 | Reading | 2 | 209 | Link |
| North Wilmington | Disabled access | Haverhill Line | — | Wilmington | 3 | 27 | Link |
| Ballardvale | Disabled access | Haverhill Line | — | Andover | 4 | 167 | Link |
| Andover | Disabled access | Haverhill Line | MVRTA: 21 | Andover | 5 | 247 | Link |
| Lawrence | Disabled access | Haverhill Line | MVRTA: 1, 2, 3, 4, 5, 6, 7, 8, 9, 10, 11, 14, 24 | Lawrence | 6 | 298 | Link |
| Bradford | Disabled access | Haverhill Line | – | Bradford | 7 | 294 | Link |
| Haverhill | Disabled access | Haverhill Line | Amtrak: Downeaster; MVRTA: 1, 13, 14, 15, 16, 17, 18 | Haverhill | 7 | – | Link |
| Chelsea | Disabled access | Newburyport/Rockport Line | MBTA subway: Silver Line (SL3); MBTA bus: 112, 114 | Chelsea | 1A | 365 | Link |
| River Works | | Newburyport/Rockport Line | — | Lynn | 1A | 36 | Link |
| Lynn | Disabled access | Newburyport/Rockport Line | MBTA bus: 426, 426W, 429, 435, 436, 439, 441, 442, 455, 456 | Lynn | 1A | 470 | Link |
| Swampscott | Disabled access | Newburyport/Rockport Line | – | Swampscott | 3 | 737 | Link |
| Salem | Disabled access | Newburyport/Rockport Line | MBTA bus: 435, 450, 450W, 451, 455, 456 | Salem | 3 | 1,739 | Link |
| Beverly | Disabled access | Newburyport/Rockport Line | CATA: 8, 9 | Beverly | 4 | 1,011 | Link |
| North Beverly | Disabled access | Newburyport/Rockport Line | MBTA bus: 451 | Beverly | 5 | 170 | Link |
| Hamilton/Wenham | Disabled access | Newburyport/Rockport Line | — | Hamilton | 5 | 162 | Link |
| Ipswich | Disabled access | Newburyport/Rockport Line | CATA: 12 (seasonal) | Ipswich | 6 | 205 | Link |
| Rowley | Disabled access | Newburyport/Rockport Line | — | Rowley | 7 | 62 | Link |
| Newburyport | Disabled access | Newburyport/Rockport Line | MVRTA: 11, 19, 20 | Newburyport | 8 | 349 | Link |
| Montserrat | Disabled access | Newburyport/Rockport Line | | Beverly | 4 | 185 | Link |
| Prides Crossing | | Newburyport/Rockport Line | — | Beverly | 5 | – | Link |
| Beverly Farms | Disabled access | Newburyport/Rockport Line | — | Beverly | 5 | 83 | Link |
| Manchester | Disabled access | Newburyport/Rockport Line | — | Manchester-by-the-Sea | 6 | 121 | Link |
| West Gloucester | Disabled access | Newburyport/Rockport Line | CATA: 5 | Gloucester | 7 | 38 | Link |
| Gloucester | Disabled access | Newburyport/Rockport Line | CATA: 2, 2A, 3, 4, 7, 9, 11 (seasonal) | Gloucester | 7 | 275 | Link |
| Rockport | Disabled access | Newburyport/Rockport Line | CATA: 3, 8, 9, 10 (seasonal) | Rockport | 8 | 140` | Link |

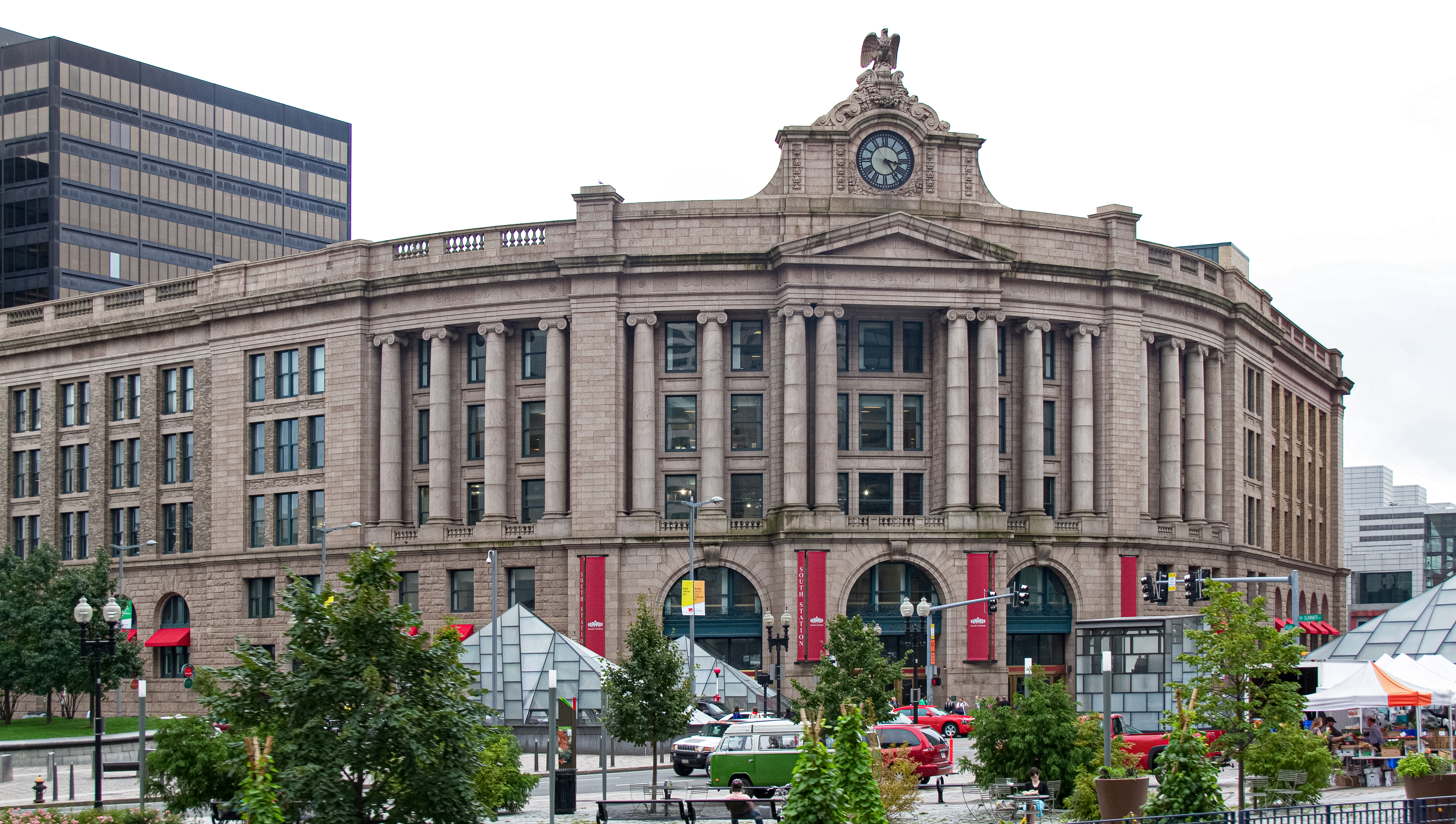
South Station is the busiest MBTA Commuter Rail station and the terminal for the eight southside lines.

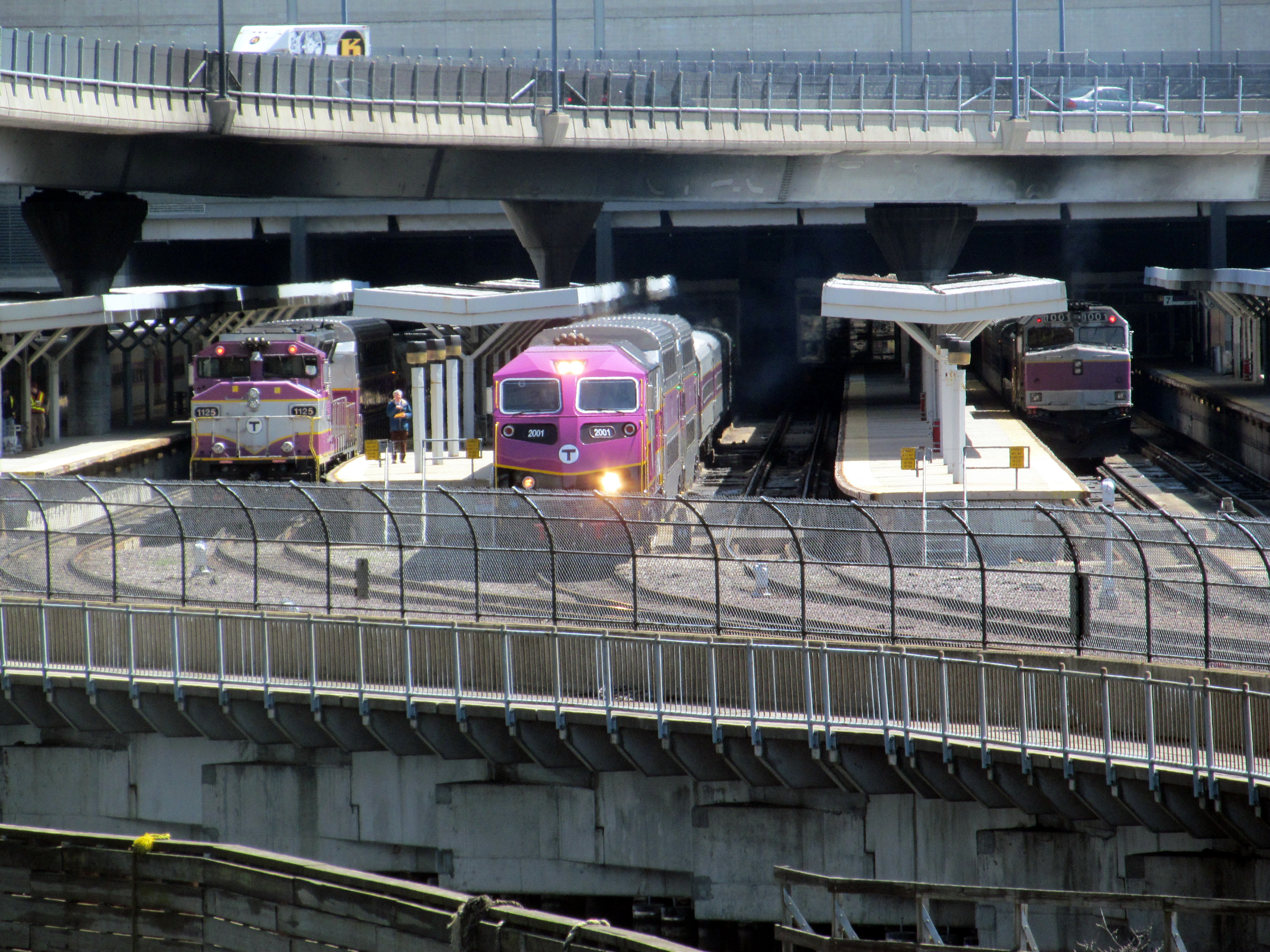
North Station is the second-busiest station and the terminal for the four northside lines.

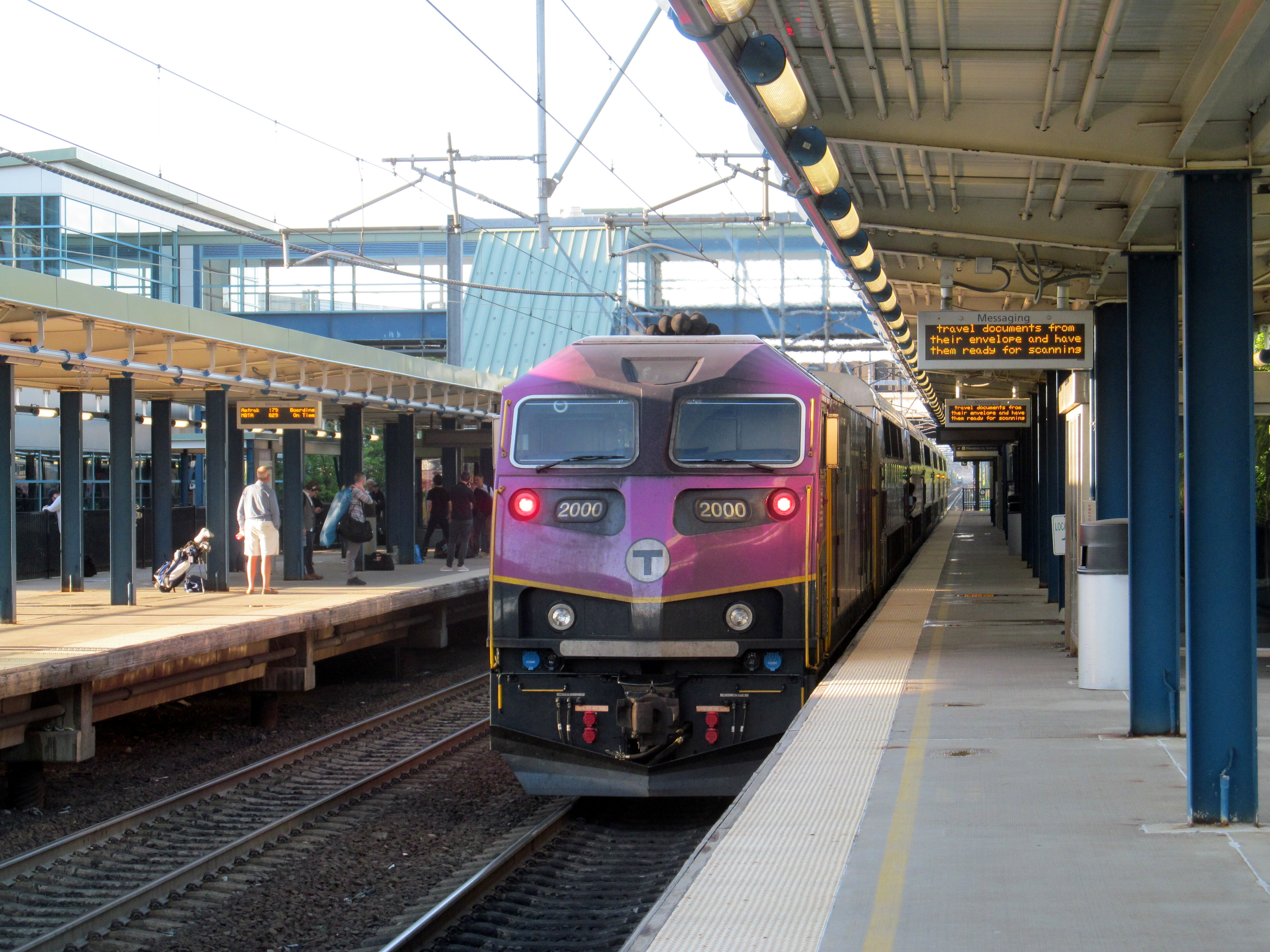
Route 128 station, on the busy Northeast Corridor, is used by Providence/Stoughton Line trains (shown) as well as Amtrak trains.

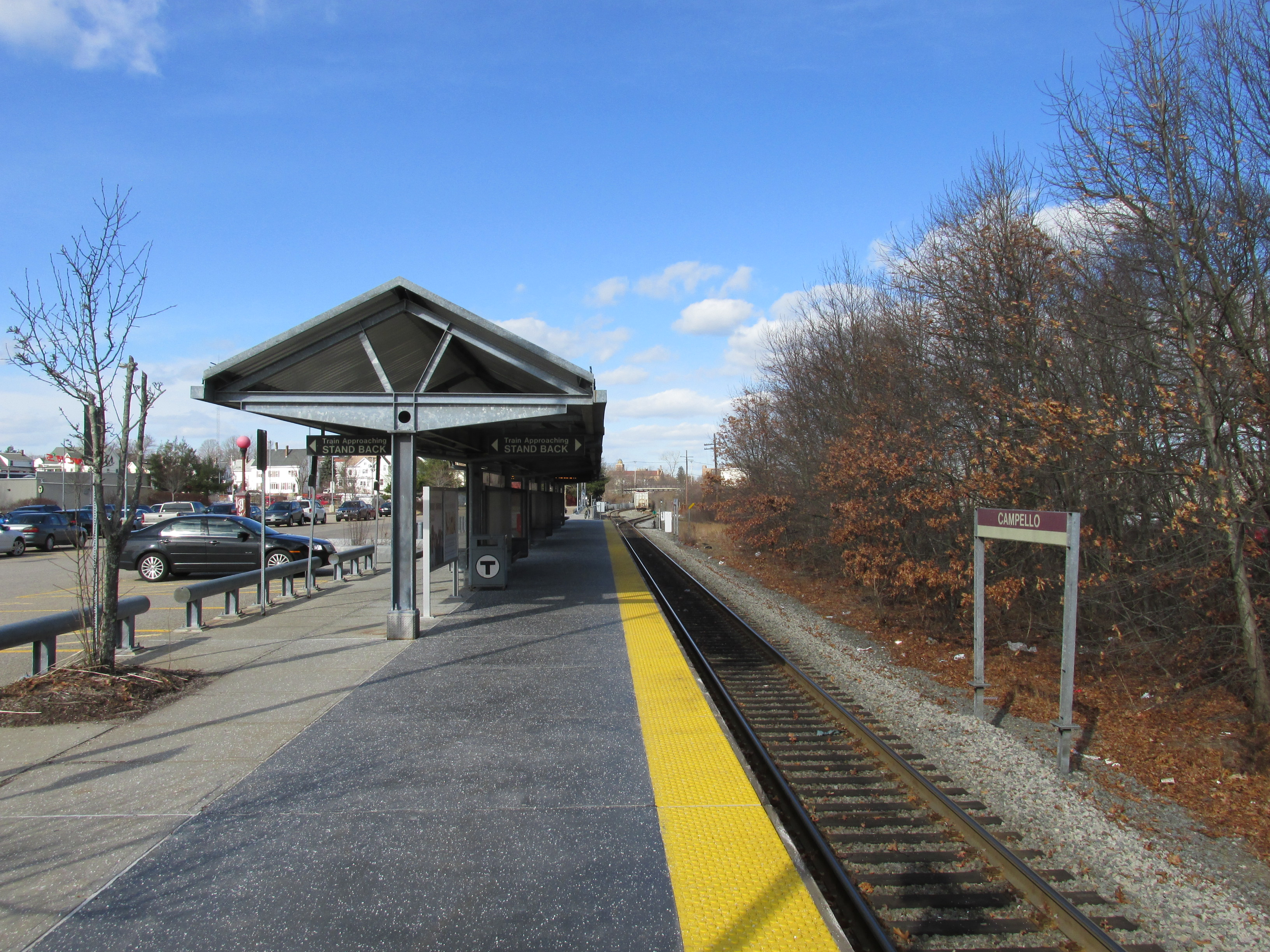
Campello station, a typical accessible station with a full-length high-level platform

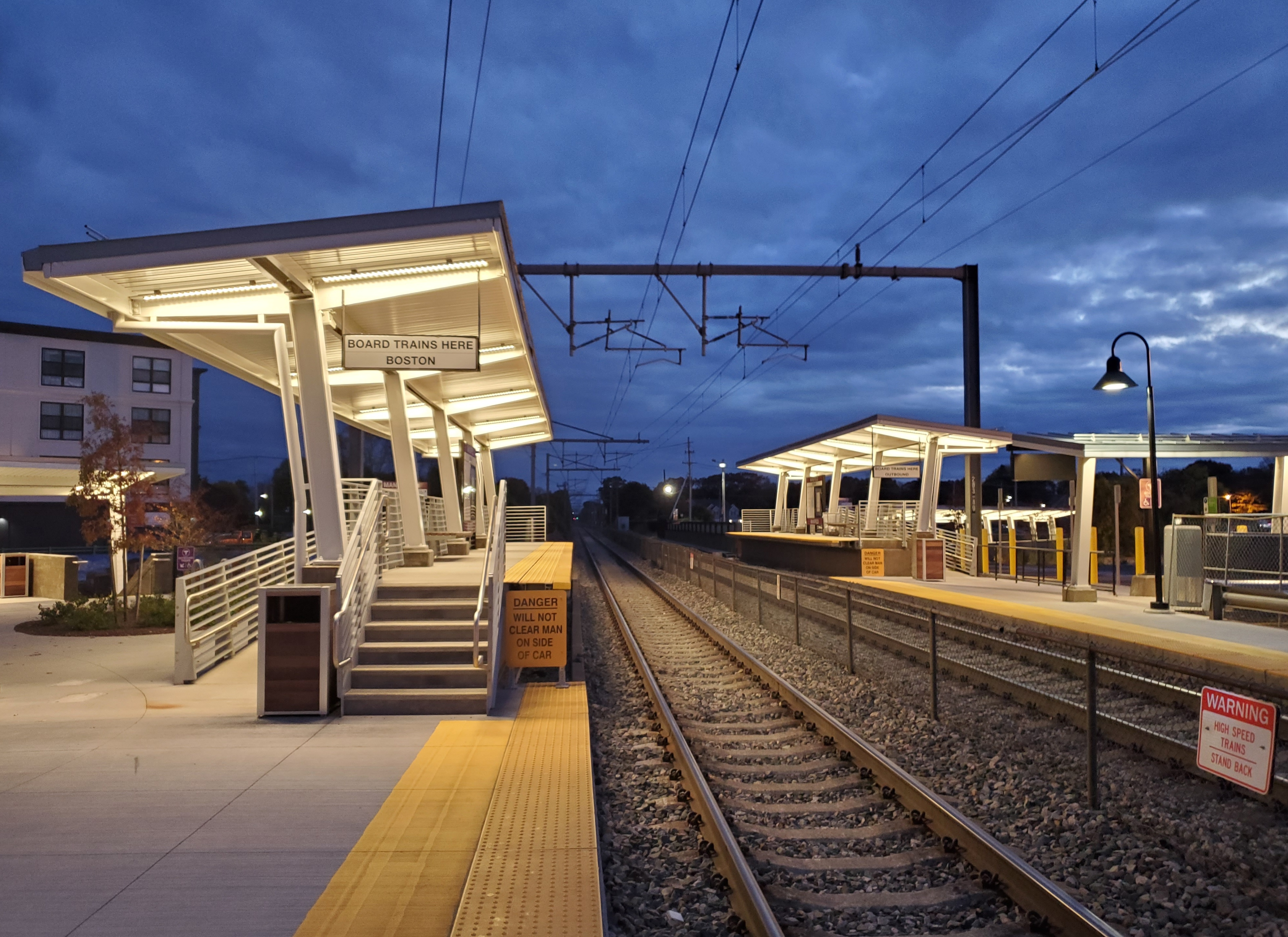
Accessible mini-high platforms at Mansfield station

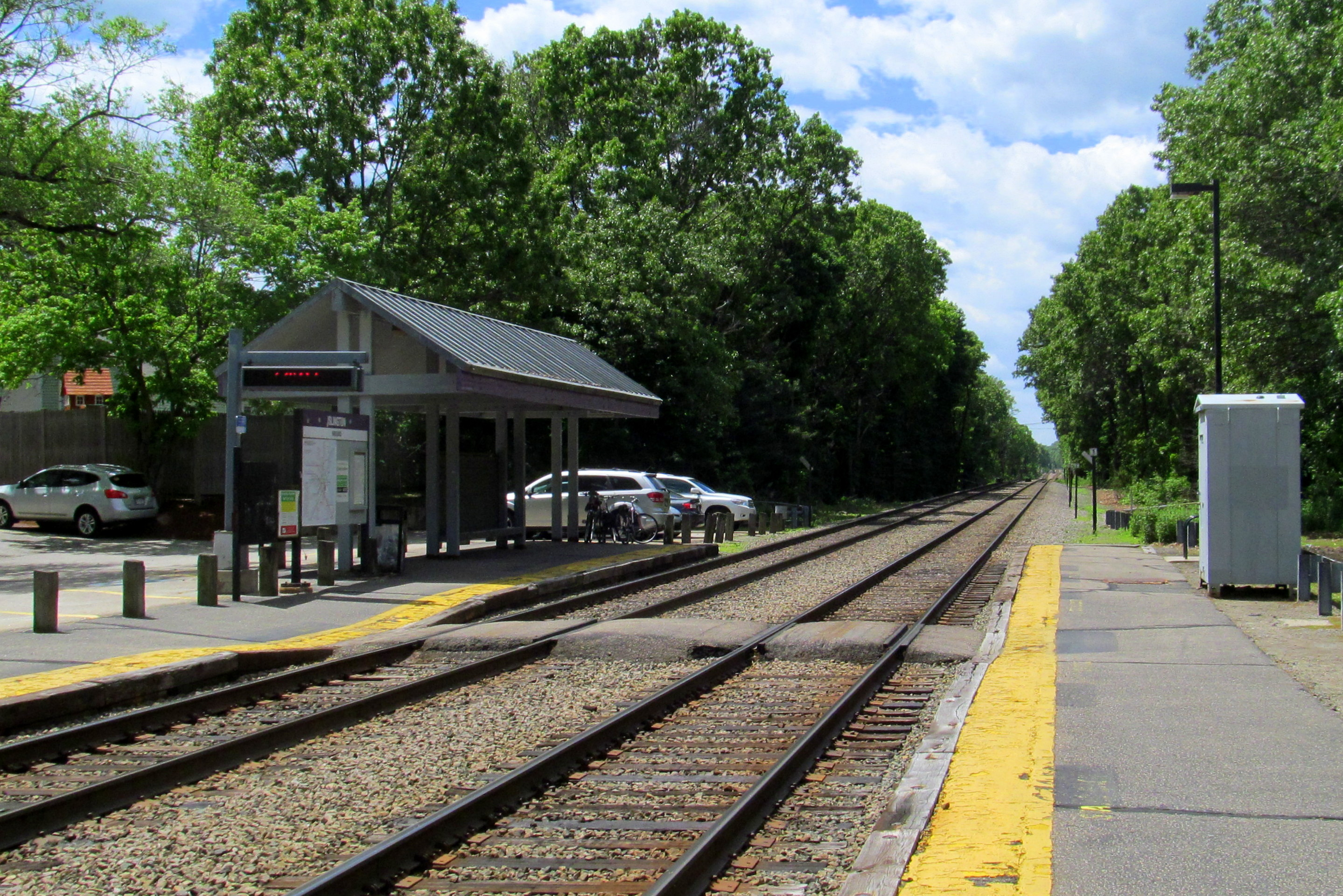
Islington station, a typical non-accessible station with low-level platforms

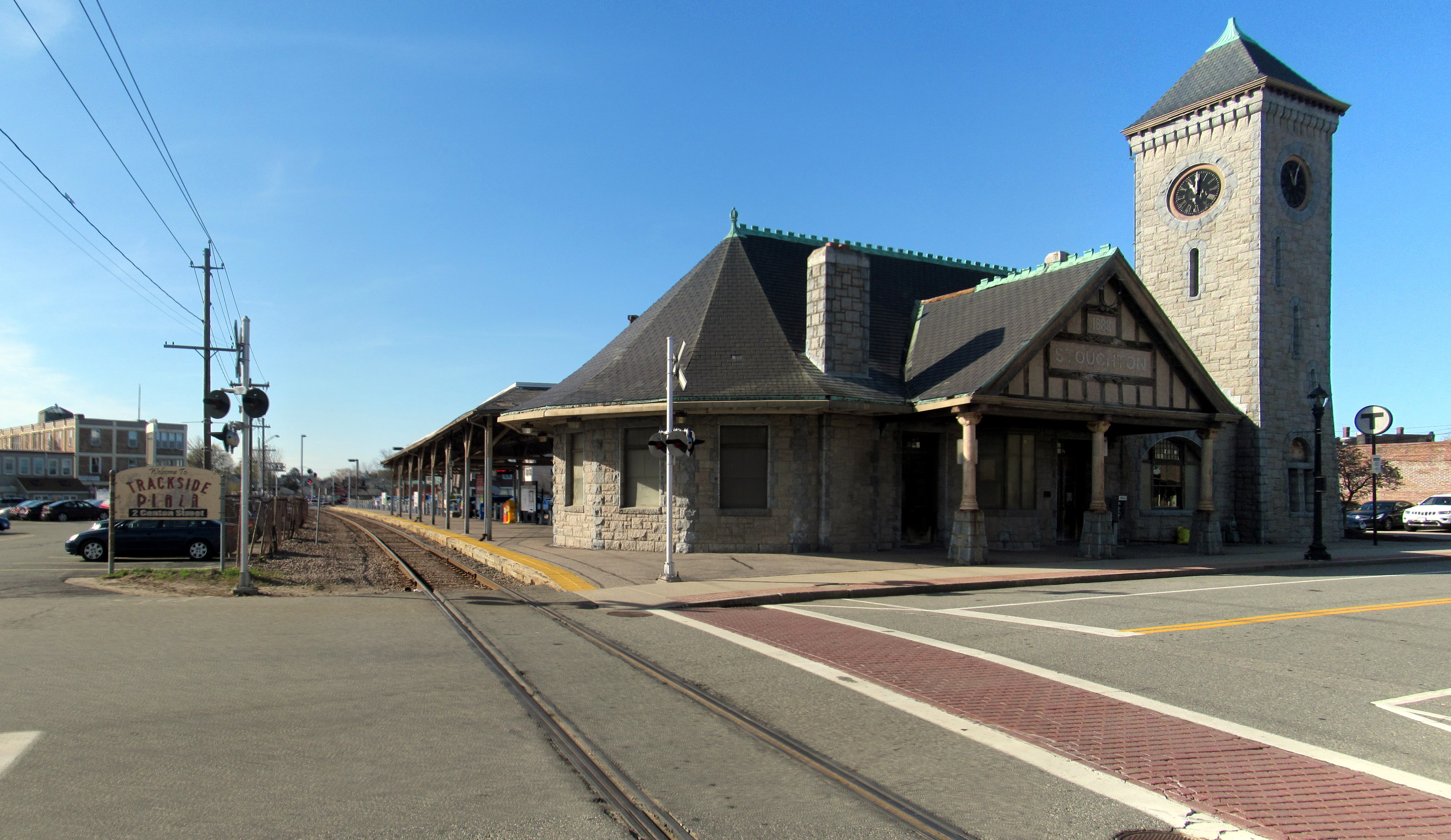
Stoughton station is one of a number of stations on the system with preserved historic depot buildings.

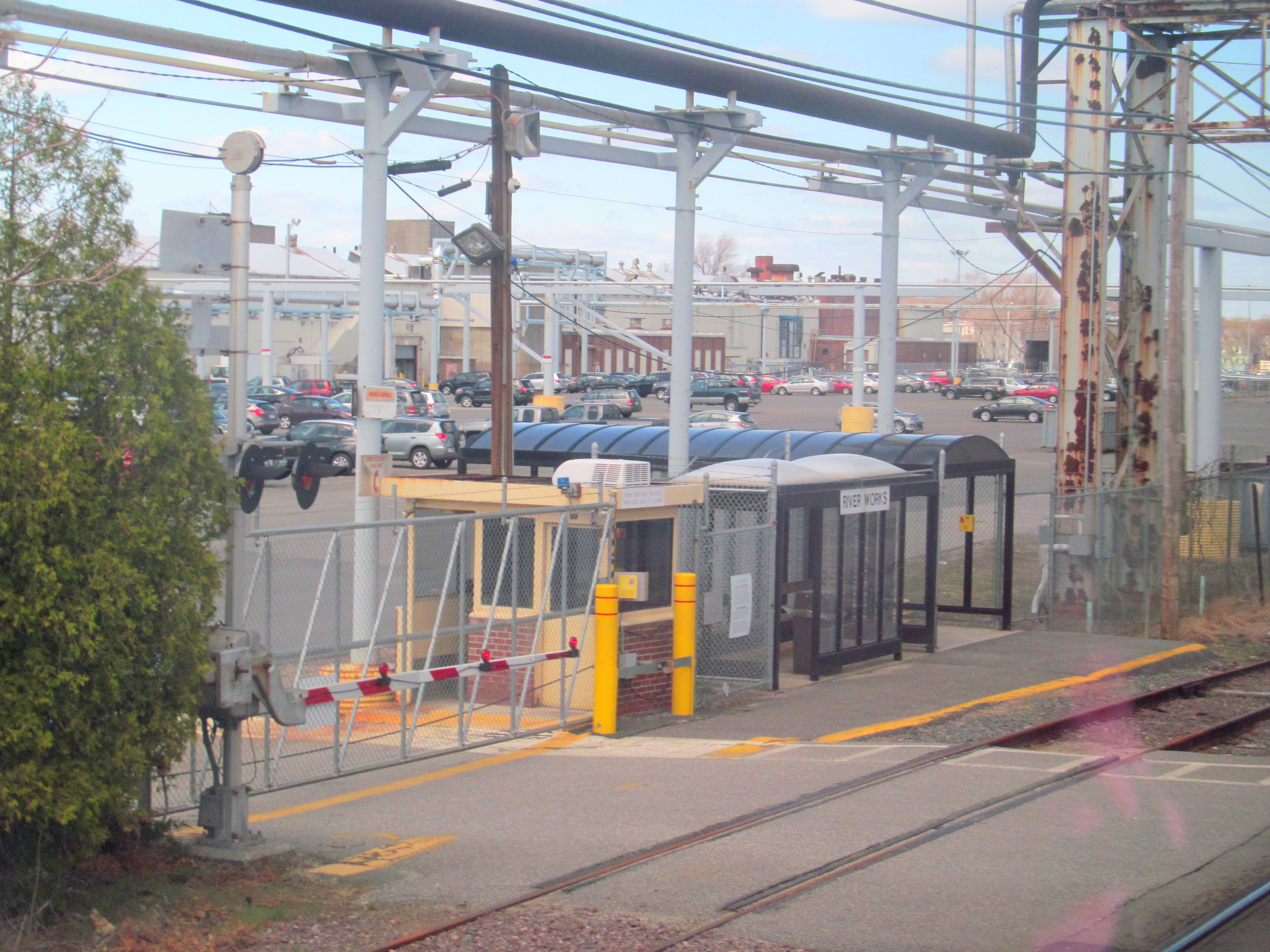
River Works station, the only non-public station on the system, is for use only by employees of a General Electric plant.

== Future stations ==
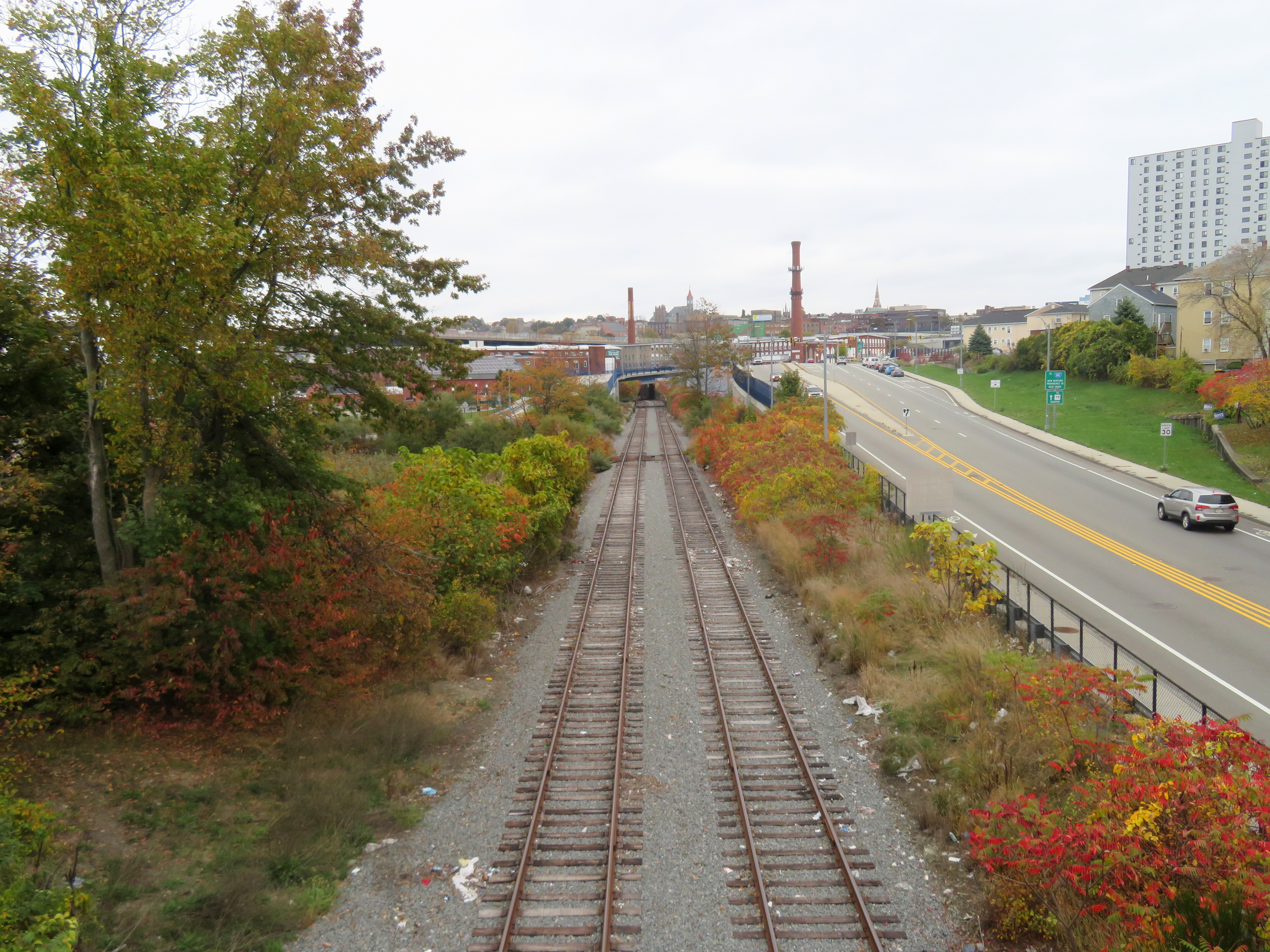
The planned site of Battleship Cove station

Five additional stations are planned, but not funded, as part of the second phase of the South Coast Rail project. West Station is planned as part of the redevelopment of the former Beacon Park Yard, while South Salem is municipally planned.

| Station | Line | City | Ref |
|---|---|---|---|
| Battleship Cove | South Coast Rail | Fall River | |
| Easton Village | South Coast Rail | North Easton | |
| North Easton | South Coast Rail | North Easton/Stoughton | |
| Raynham Place | South Coast Rail | Raynham | |
| South Salem | Newburyport/Rockport Line | Salem | |
| Taunton | South Coast Rail | Taunton | |
| West Station | Framingham/Worcester Line | Boston | |

== Former stations ==
=== Stations closed without MBTA subsidy ===
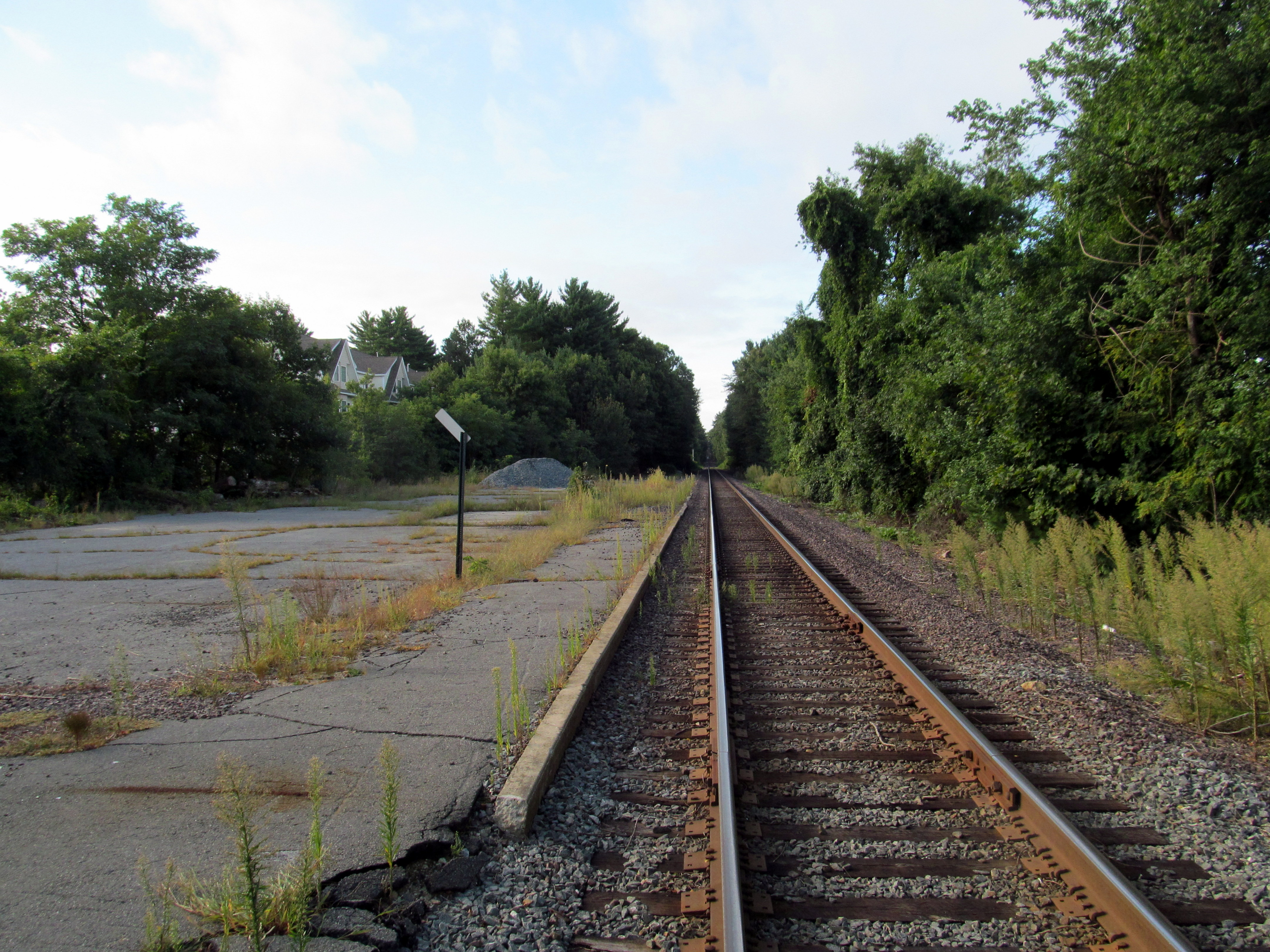
Remains of the platform of Salem Street station

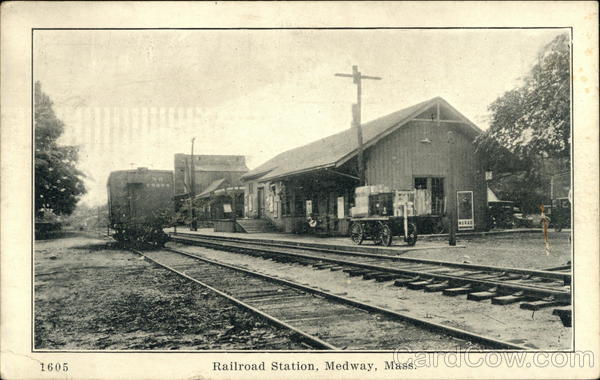
An early-20th-century postcard of Medway station

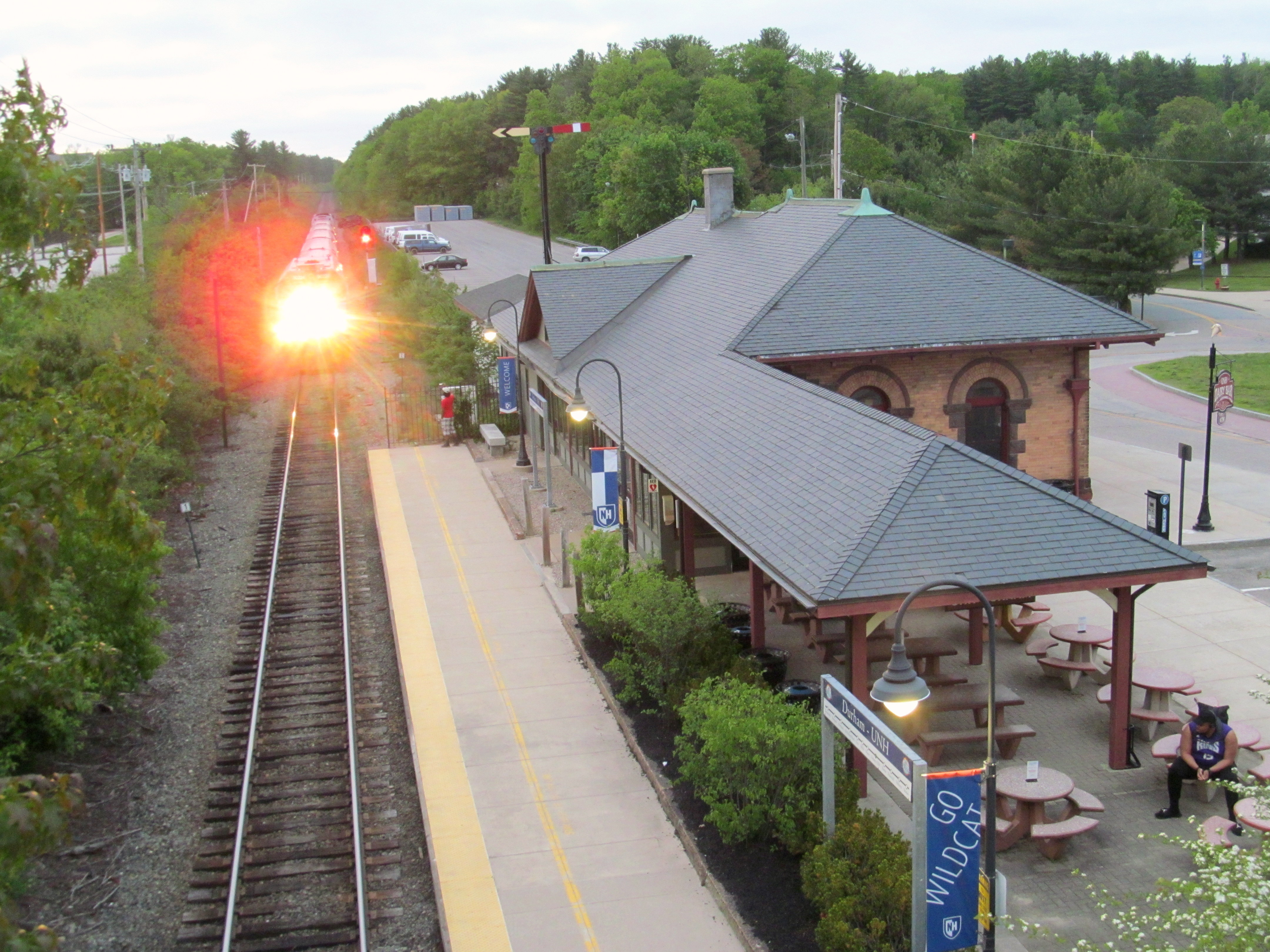
Durham station, closed by the B&M in 1967, has been served by Amtrak since 2001.

The MBTA was formed in August 1964 to subsidize suburban commuter rail services. Subsidies for Boston and Maine Railroad (B&M) lines north of Boston began in 1965; subsidies for New York Central Railroad and New Haven Railroad lines west and south of Boston began later. If a railroad was given ICC permission to discontinue a service, the MBTA would subsidize operation within its funding district (within about 15–25 miles [24–40 km] of Boston), while municipalities outside the district could contract with the MBTA to fund continued service.

A number of out-of-district stations (and several in-district stations) were closed in January 1965; most reopened that June, or over the next decades. However, several minor stations were never reopened. In June 1967, the B&M discontinued never-subsidized Boston–Dover and Boston–Concord round trips - the last remains of B&M interstate service. Several out-of-district stations were also closed in April 1966 when the MBTA began subsidizing several New Haven Railroad lines.

This listing includes only stations closed when MBTA or local subsidies began, or on services that were never subsidized. Stations that later reopened are not listed.

| Station | Line | City | Date closed |
|---|---|---|---|
| Blackstone | Blackstone Line | Blackstone | April 24, 1966 |
| Medway | West Medway Branch | Medway | April 24, 1966 |
| West Medway | West Medway Branch | Medway | April 24, 1966 |
| Ordway | Central Mass Branch | Hudson | January 18, 1965 |
| Gleasondale | Central Mass Branch | Hudson | January 18, 1965 |
| Hudson | Central Mass Branch | Hudson | January 18, 1965 |
| Riverview | Fitchburg Line | Waltham | January 18, 1965 |
| Walnut Hill | Lowell Line | Woburn | January 18, 1965 |
| Silver Lake | Lowell Line | Wilmington | January 18, 1965 |
| East Billerica | Lowell Line | Billerica | January 18, 1965 |
| North Chelmsford | Boston–Concord | Chelmsford | June 30, 1967 |
| Wakefield Junction | Reading Line | Wakefield | January 18, 1965 |
| Salem Street | Boston–Dover | Wilmington | June 30, 1967 |
| Atkinson | Boston–Dover | Atkinson, NH | June 30, 1967 |
| Plaistow | Boston–Dover | Plaistow, NH | June 30, 1967 |
| Newton Junction | Boston–Dover | Newton, NH | June 30, 1967 |
| Powwow River | Boston–Dover | East Kingston, NH | June 30, 1967 |
| East Kingston | Boston–Dover | East Kingston, NH | June 30, 1967 |
| Exeter | Boston–Dover | Exeter, NH | June 30, 1967 |
| Newfields | Boston–Dover | Newfields, NH | June 30, 1967 |
| Newmarket | Boston–Dover | Newmarket, NH | June 30, 1967 |
| Durham | Boston–Dover | Durham, NH | June 30, 1967 |
| Dover | Boston–Dover | Dover, NH | June 30, 1967 |
| Hampton | Portsmouth Line | Hampton, NH | January 4, 1965 |
| North Hampton | Portsmouth Line | North Hampton, NH | January 4, 1965 |
| Portsmouth | Portsmouth Line | Portsmouth, NH | January 4, 1965 |

=== Stations dropped after the start of MBTA subsidies ===
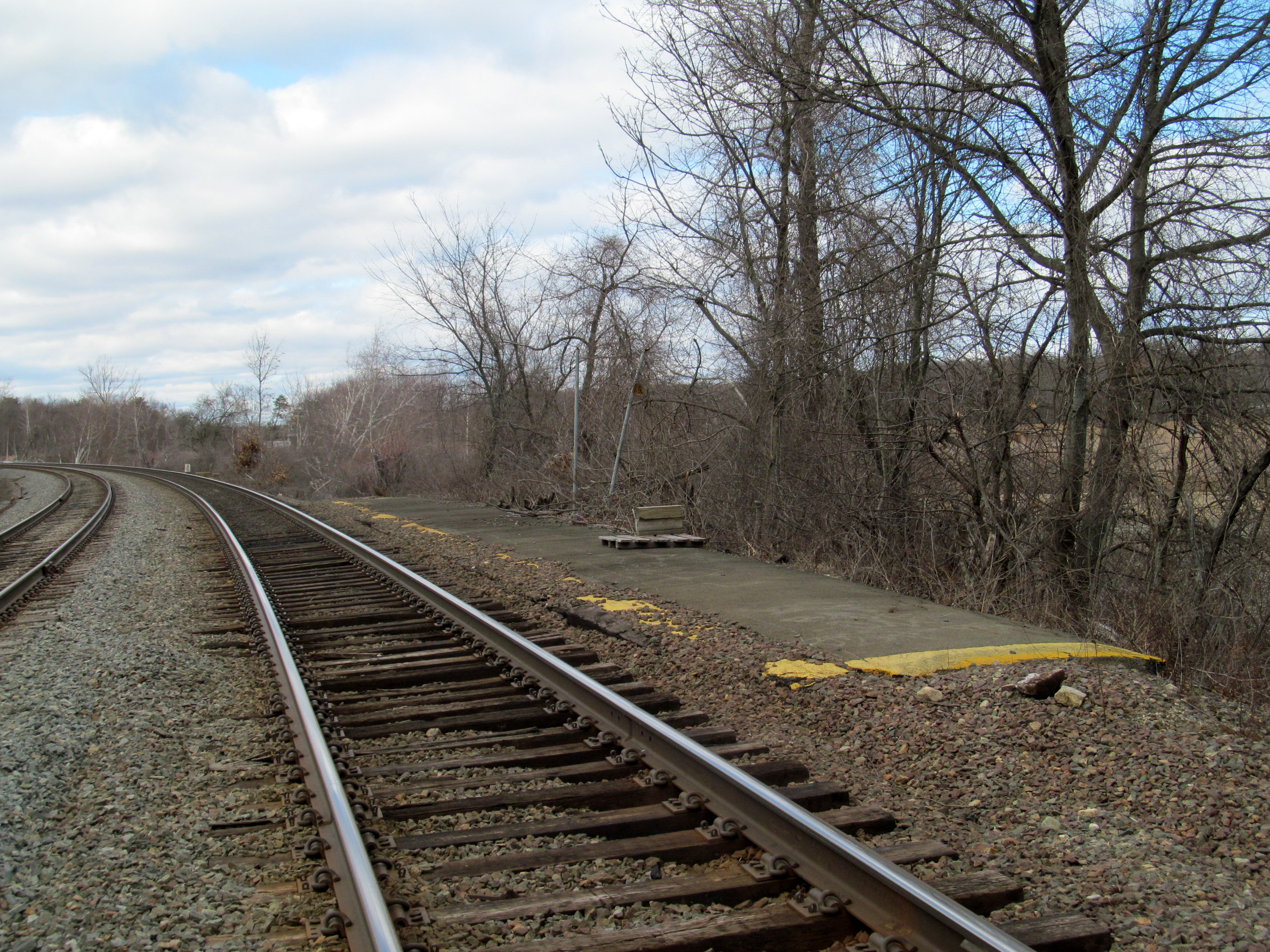
The abandoned outbound platform of Lechmere Warehouse station, the most recent station to permanently close

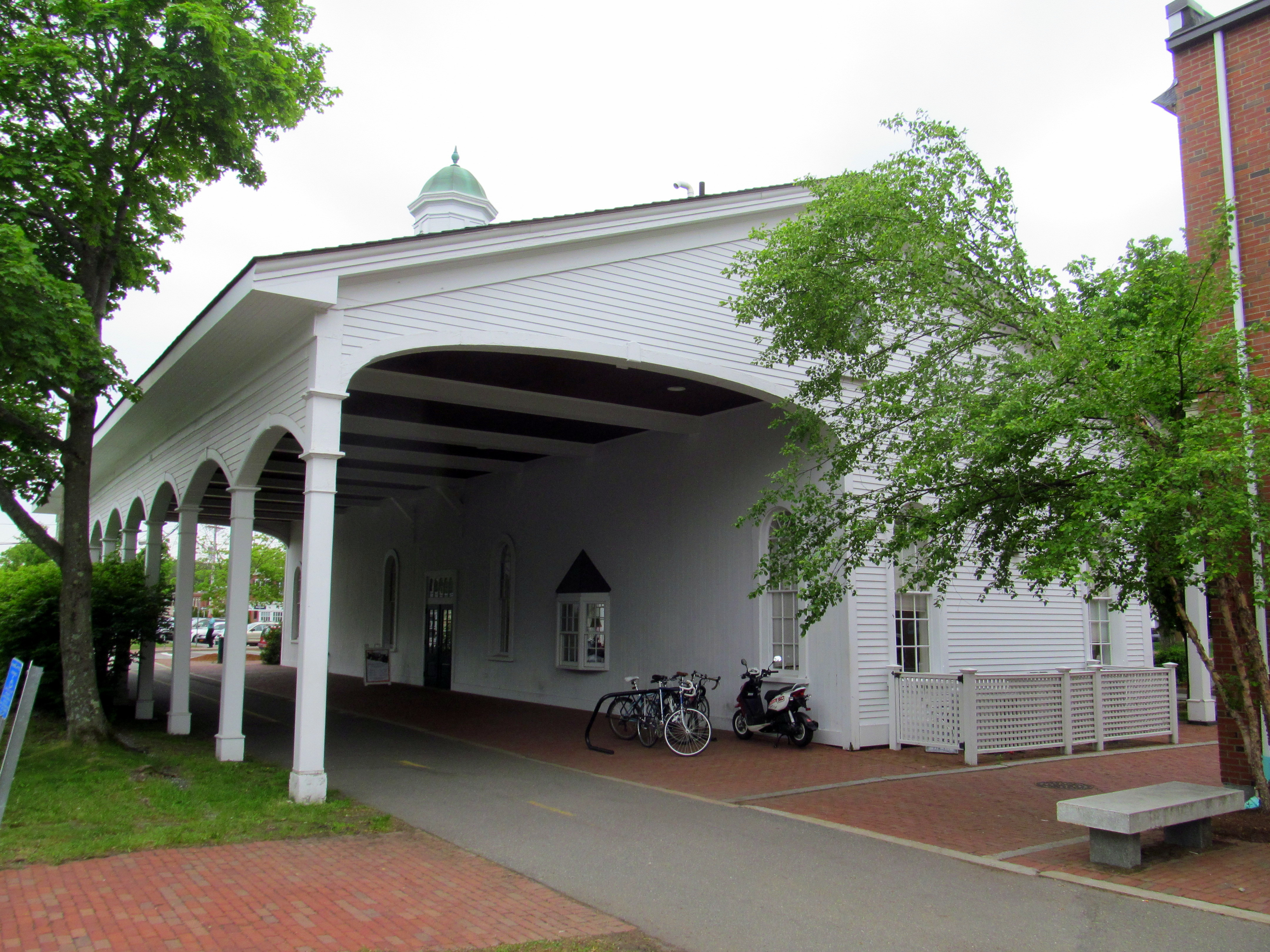
The Minuteman Bikeway now passes through the former trainshed of Lexington Depot

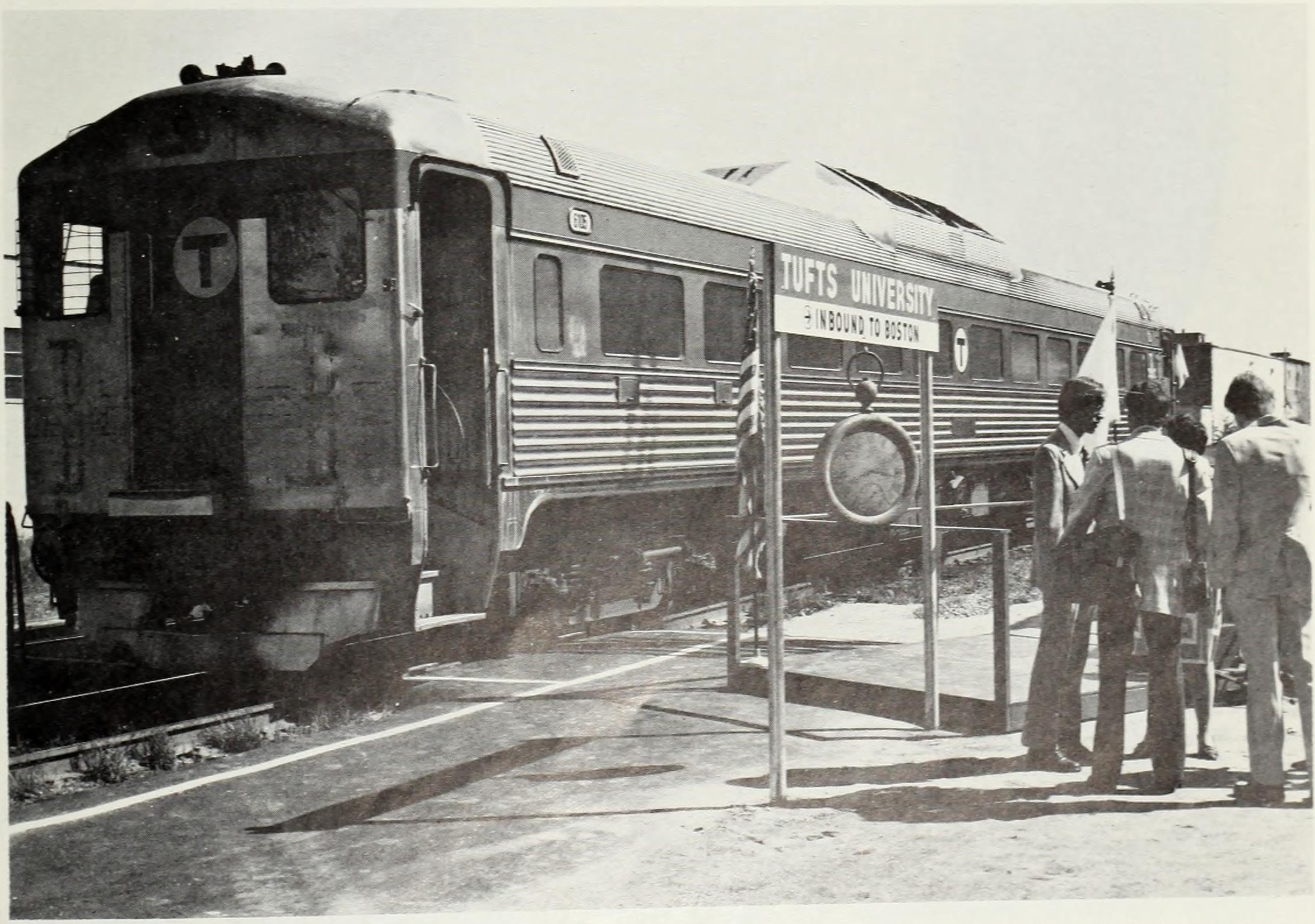
The short-lived Tufts University station

The following stations had MBTA-subsidized service at one point, but are no longer served by the MBTA. Most were closed between 1967 and 1981, as four limited-service lines and a number of low-ridership stations were dropped. Three additional low-ridership stations were dropped in the 1980s and 1990s.

| Station | Line | City | Date closed |
|---|---|---|---|
| Mount Hope | Providence/Stoughton Line | Boston/Roslindale | November 3, 1979 |
| East Foxboro | Providence/Stoughton Line | Foxborough | November 1977 |
| East Dedham | Dedham Branch | Dedham | April 21, 1967 |
| Stone Haven | Dedham Branch | Dedham | April 21, 1967 |
| Dedham | Dedham Branch | Dedham | April 21, 1967 |
| Charles River | Millis Branch | Dover | April 21, 1967 |
| Dover | Millis Branch | Dover | April 21, 1967 |
| Farm Street | Millis Branch | Medfield | April 21, 1967 |
| Medfield | Millis Branch | Medfield | April 21, 1967 |
| Clicquot | Millis Branch | Millis | April 21, 1967 |
| Millis | Millis Branch | Millis | April 21, 1967 |
| Riverside | Framingham/Worcester Line | Newton | October 28, 1977 |
| Waltham North | Central Mass Branch | Waltham | November 26, 1971 |
| Waltham Highlands | Central Mass Branch | Waltham | November 26, 1971 |
| Weston | Central Mass Branch | Weston | November 26, 1971 |
| Cherry Brook | Central Mass Branch | Weston | November 26, 1971 |
| Tower Hill | Central Mass Branch | Wayland | November 26, 1971 |
| Wayland | Central Mass Branch | Wayland | November 26, 1971 |
| East Sudbury | Central Mass Branch | Sudbury | November 26, 1971 |
| South Sudbury | Central Mass Branch | Sudbury | November 26, 1971 |
| Clematis Brook | Fitchburg Line | Waltham | June 1978 |
| Beaver Brook | Fitchburg Line | Waltham | June 1978 |
| West Acton | Fitchburg Line | Acton | March 1, 1975 |
| Littleton | Fitchburg Line | Littleton | March 1, 1975 |
| Gardner | Fitchburg Line | Gardner | December 31, 1986 |
| Lake Street | Lexington Branch | Arlington | January 10, 1977 |
| Arlington | Lexington Branch | Arlington | January 10, 1977 |
| East Lexington | Lexington Branch | Lexington | January 10, 1977 |
| Pierce's Bridge | Lexington Branch | Lexington | January 10, 1977 |
| Munroe | Lexington Branch | Lexington | January 10, 1977 |
| Lexington | Lexington Branch | Lexington | January 10, 1977 |
| North Lexington | Lexington Branch | Lexington | January 10, 1977 |
| Bedford | Lexington Branch | Bedford | January 10, 1977 |
| Tufts University | Lowell Line | Medford | October 1979 |
| Cross Street | Lowell Line – Woburn Branch | Woburn | January 30, 1981 |
| Woburn | Lowell Line – Woburn Branch | Woburn | January 30, 1981 |
| Winchester Highlands | Lowell Line | Winchester | June 1978 |
| Lechmere Warehouse | Lowell Line | Woburn | 1996 |
| Nashua | Lowell Line | Nashua, NH | March 1, 1981 |
| Merrimack | Lowell Line | Merrimack, NH | March 1, 1981 |
| Manchester | Lowell Line | Manchester, NH | March 1, 1981 |
| Concord | Lowell Line | Concord, NH | March 1, 1981 |
| Shawsheen | Haverhill Line | Andover | April 27, 1980 |
| North Andover | Haverhill Line | North Andover | November 1974 |
| Harbor | Newburyport/Rockport Line | Gloucester | January 7, 1985 |

=== Relocated stations ===
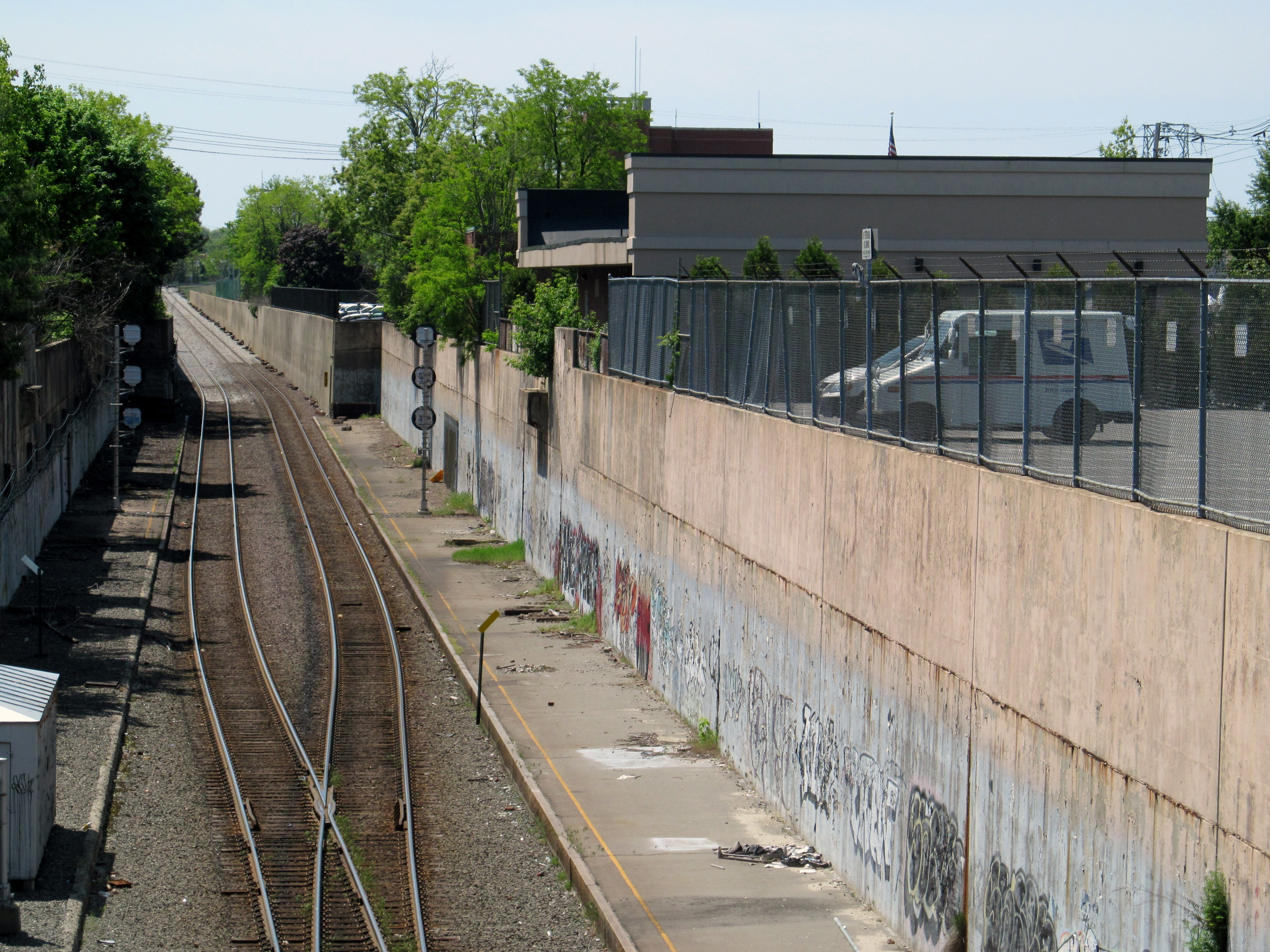
Remains of the former Salem station, disused since 1987, with the repurposed station building at right

Most stations reconstructed (or closed and reopened) during the MBTA era have been rebuilt on or adjacent to the site of the old station. However, several stations have been substantially relocated.

| Station | Line | City | Date closed | Notes |
|---|---|---|---|---|
| Pawtucket-Central Falls | Providence/Stoughton Line | Pawtucket, RI | February 20, 1981 | Pawtucket/Central Falls station opened 0.5 miles (0.8 km) southwest in 2023. |
| Providence | Providence/Stoughton Line | Providence, RI | February 20, 1981 | Amtrak service moved to Providence station on a new alignment 0.2 miles (0.3 km) north in 1986; MBTA service to Providence resumed in 1988 using the new station. |
| Lawrence | Haverhill Line | Lawrence | December 6, 2005 | Moved 0.4 miles (0.6 km) east |
| Salem | Newburyport/Rockport Line | Salem | August 10, 1987 | Moved 0.5 miles (0.8 km) north |
| Newburyport | Newburyport/Rockport Line | Newburyport | April 2, 1976 | MBTA service resumed in 1998 using a station 1.0 mile (1.6 km) south. |
| Chelsea | Newburyport/Rockport Line | Chelsea | November 15, 2021 | Moved 0.4 miles (0.6 km) west |
| Middleborough/Lakeville | Middleborough/Lakeville Line | Lakeville | March 24, 2025 | Commuter rail service was moved to Middleborough station 0.7 miles (1.1 km) north. The station was renamed to Lakeville station and is still served by the CapeFlyer. |
