= Pierce's Bridge station =

Former railway station in Lexington, MA

Pierce's Bridge
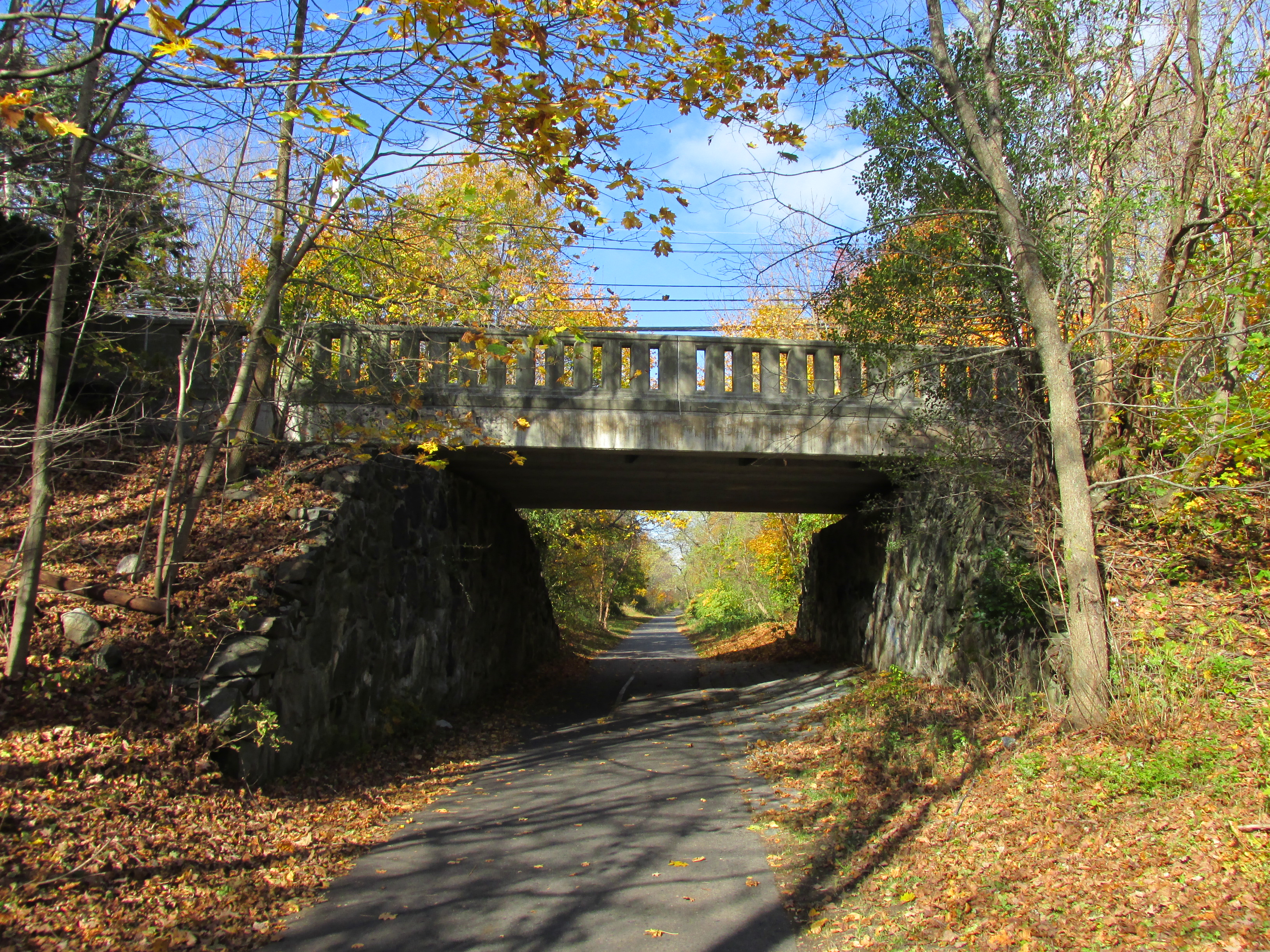
- The Minuteman Bikeway at the former station site

General information
- Location: Maple Street; Lexington, Massachusetts
- Coordinates: 42.4359°N 71.2092°W
- Line: Lexington Branch

Other information
- Fare zone: 2

History
- Opened: Between 1873 and 1884
- Closed: January 10, 1977

Services
Preceding station	MBTA	Following station
Munroe toward Bedford	Lexington Branch	East Lexington toward North Station
Location

Pierce's Bridge station was a railroad station on the Lexington Branch in Lexington, Massachusetts, United States. The line was built in 1873; Pierces Bridge station was open by 1884. That year, the railroad proposed to merge it with nearby East Lexington station, but withdrew the plan due to public objection. The name referred to Peletiah P. Pierce, a 19th-century dairy farmer whose farm was located nearby at the foot of Maple Street. By 1889, a small wooden station building was located on the west side of the tracks slightly north of Maple Street. It was extant until at least 1960. The station closed along with the Lexington Branch on January 10, 1977.
