= Arlington station (Lexington Branch) =

Former railway station in Arlington, Massachusetts

Arlington
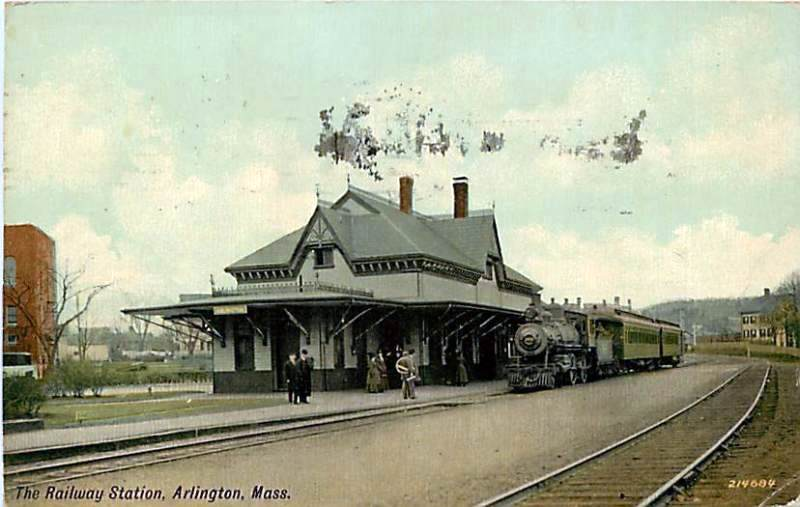
- Arlington station around 1910

General information
- Location: Mystic Street, Arlington, Massachusetts
- Coordinates: 42.416375°N 71.153432°W
- Owner: Boston and Maine Railroad until 1958, 1965–1976; MBTA 1976–1977
- Line: Lexington Branch

Other information
- Fare zone: 1

History
- Opened: 1846 (original); October 1965 (MBTA)
- Closed: May 16, 1958; January 10, 1977

Passengers
- 1976: 7–12 daily

Former services
Preceding station	MBTA	Following station
East Lexington toward Bedford	Lexington Branch	Lake Street toward North Station
Preceding station	Boston and Maine Railroad	Following station
Brattle toward Lowell or Reformatory	Lexington Branch	Lake Street toward Boston
Location

Arlington station (also known as Arlington Center and Arlington Centre) was a regional rail station in Arlington, Massachusetts. Located in downtown Arlington, it served the Lexington Branch. It was closed in January 1977 when service on the Lexington Branch was suspended.

== History ==
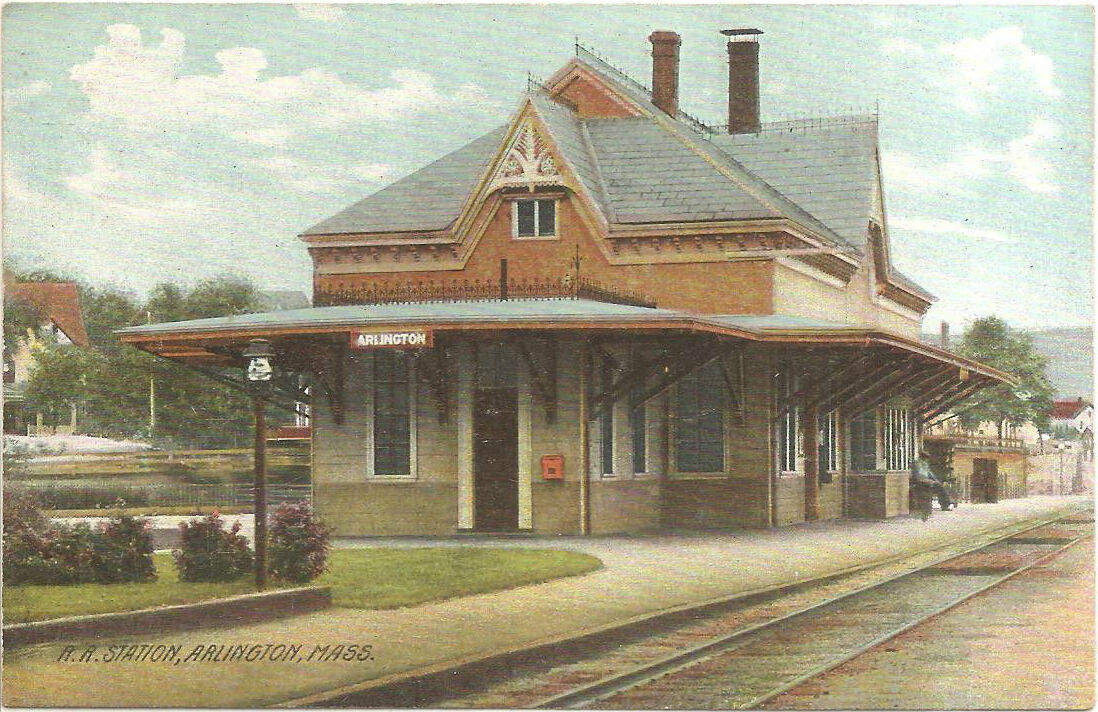
Arlington Center station on an early postcard

The Lexington and West Cambridge Railroad opened from West Cambridge to Lexington on September 1, 1846. Arlington station was located near the intersection of Massachusetts Avenue and Mystic Street in Arlington.

The B&L was leased by the Boston and Maine Railroad (B&M) in 1887. In the 1890s and 1900s, during the City Beautiful movement, the B&M held contests among its station agents to create floral displays at its station. Freight agent Joseph Trembly's displays at Arlington won prizes in several years.

Grade crossings from Grove Street in Arlington Center to Park Avenue at Arlington Heights were eliminated in 1900, with modifications to Arlington Heights and Brattles stations. The grade crossing of Mystic Street and Massachusetts Avenue at Arlington Center was not eliminated at that time due to difficult grades and the lengthy bridge that would be required.

=== Closure ===
On April 18, 1958, the Boston and Maine Railroad received permission from the Public Utilities Commission to drastically curtail its suburban commuter service, including abandoning branches, closing stations, and cutting trains. Among the approved cuts was the closure of the Lexington Branch's four stations in Arlington (Lake Street, Arlington, Brattles, and Arlington Heights), as Arlington was part of the funding district of the Metropolitan Transit Authority, which provided parallel bus service on Massachusetts Avenue. The four stations, with collective daily ridership around 200 passengers, were closed on May 16, 1958. By 1968, the station building was reused as a senior center.

Due to community input, Arlington Center station was reopened in October 1965, followed by Lake Street in March 1968. On a typical day, no more than 7 to 12 passengers used Arlington station; although taking the Lexington Branch allowed one to reach downtown faster than if one had used the 77 bus and the Red Line (transferring at Harvard, then the northwestern terminus of the Red Line), it had only one round trip per day (one train inbound to Boston in the morning, and then one back out to Bedford Depot in the evening) and was substantially more expensive.

In January 1977, following a major snowstorm which temporarily shut down the Lexington Branch, stranding a train at Bedford Depot, the MBTA announced that commuter rail service on the branch would not be restored. In the 1980s, the MBTA planned to extend the Red Line through Arlington and Lexington to Route 128 along the former path of the Lexington Branch as part of the Northwest Extension, including renewed service to Arlington Center station, but fierce opposition from Arlington residents scuttled this plan, and the Northwest Extension was cut short to Alewife in northwestern Cambridge.

The only surviving stations of the Lexington Branch are Bedford Depot and Lexington; Arlington was demolished at some point following the branch's closure.
