= Lake Street station (Arlington, Massachusetts) =

Former railway station in Arlington, Massachusetts, US

Lake Street
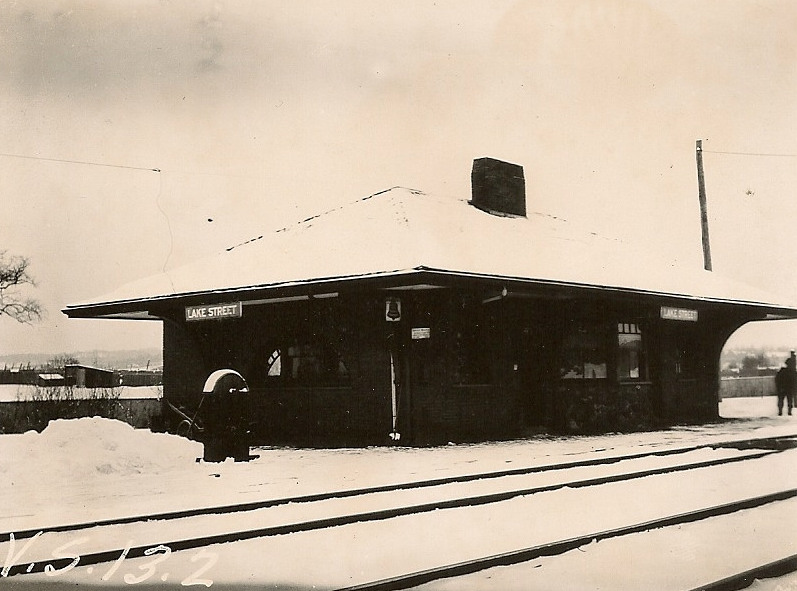
- Lake Street station around 1915

General information
- Location: Orvis Circle and Lake Street; Arlington, Massachusetts
- Coordinates: 42°24′16.3″N 71°8′49.1″W
- Line: Lexington Branch
- Platforms: 1 side platform
- Tracks: 1

Other information
- Fare zone: 1

History
- Opened: c. 1846; March 1968
- Closed: May 17, 1958; January 10, 1977
- Rebuilt: 1885

Passengers
- 1976: Fewer than 10 daily

Services
Preceding station	MBTA	Following station
Arlington toward Bedford	Lexington Branch	Cambridge toward North Station
Location

Lake Street station was a commuter rail station on the Lexington Branch, located in the East Arlington section of Arlington, Massachusetts. The line opened as the Lexington and West Cambridge Railroad in 1846, with a station at Ware Street among the earliest stops. It was renamed Pond Street by 1850 and Lake Street in 1867. The Boston and Lowell Railroad (B&L) acquired the line in 1870 and built a new station building in 1885. Service continued under the Boston and Maine Railroad (B&M) – successor to the B&L – though it declined during the 20th century. Lake Street station and three others on the line were closed in May 1958. The Massachusetts Bay Transportation Authority (MBTA) began subsidizing service in 1965, and Lake Street station reopened in March 1968. All passenger service on the Lexington Branch ended on January 10, 1977; it was converted into the Minuteman Bikeway in the early 1990s.

== History ==
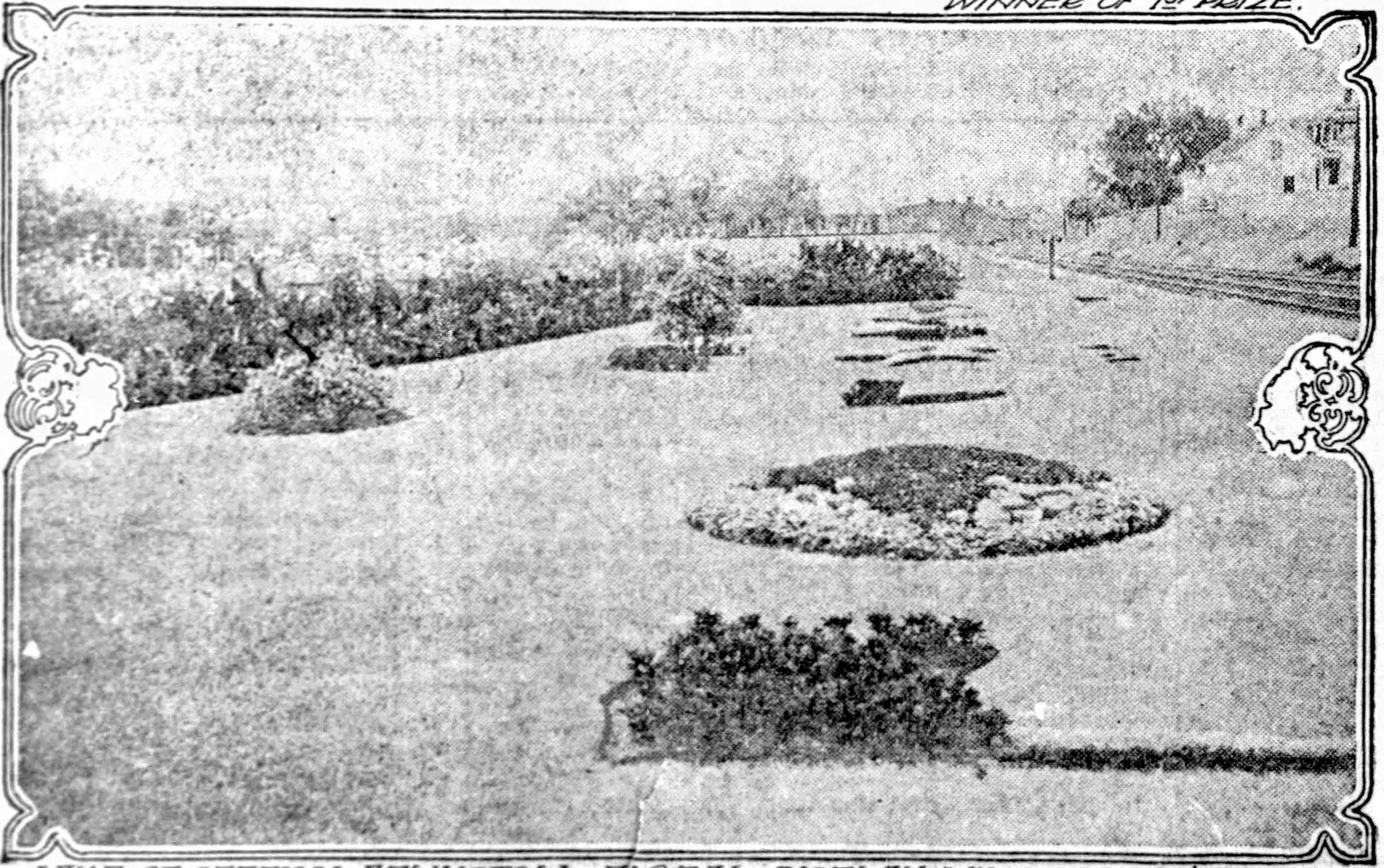
Floral display at Lake Street station in 1905

The Lexington and West Cambridge Railroad opened from West Cambridge station (on the Fitchburg Railroad) to Lexington through the town of West Cambridge on August 25, 1846. Among the intermediate stations was Ware Lane. It was renamed Pond Street by 1850. When the town of West Cambridge changed its name to Arlington in 1867, Spy Pond was renamed Lake Arlington. The street and soon the railroad station were renamed Lake Street, though Spy Pond soon returned as the pond's name. The railroad was acquired by the Boston and Lowell Railroad (B&L) in 1870 and a new line was constructed from Lake Street to Somerville Junction to connect with the B&L mainline. The new line opened on December 1, 1870, and the old route to West Cambridge was abandoned.

The original station was on the east side of the tracks on the north side of Lake Street. In 1876, residents voted for the town selectmen to push for the B&L to replace the station building. Not until June 1884, however, did the state railroad commissioners recommend immediate construction of a new station. The new station, on the west side of the tracks about 200 feet (61 m) north of Lake Street, opened in November 1885. The old station building was moved to Hill Crossing on the Central Massachusetts Railroad. By the late 19th century, Lake Street station was commonly used to reach Spy Pond for winter ice skating.

The B&L was leased by the Boston and Maine Railroad (B&M) in 1887. In the 1890s and 1900s, during the City Beautiful movement, the B&M held contests among its station agents to create floral displays around stations. Station agent Thomas P. Brosnahan's displays at Lake Street won prizes in several years. In 1926–27, the B&M rebuilt the abandoned line between Lake Street and West Cambridge to allow the Lexington Branch to use the Fitchburg mainline east of West Cambridge. On April 24, 1927, passenger service was rerouted over the rebuilt line. Most of the 1870-built connector was retained as the freight-only Fitchburg Cutoff.

=== Closure ===
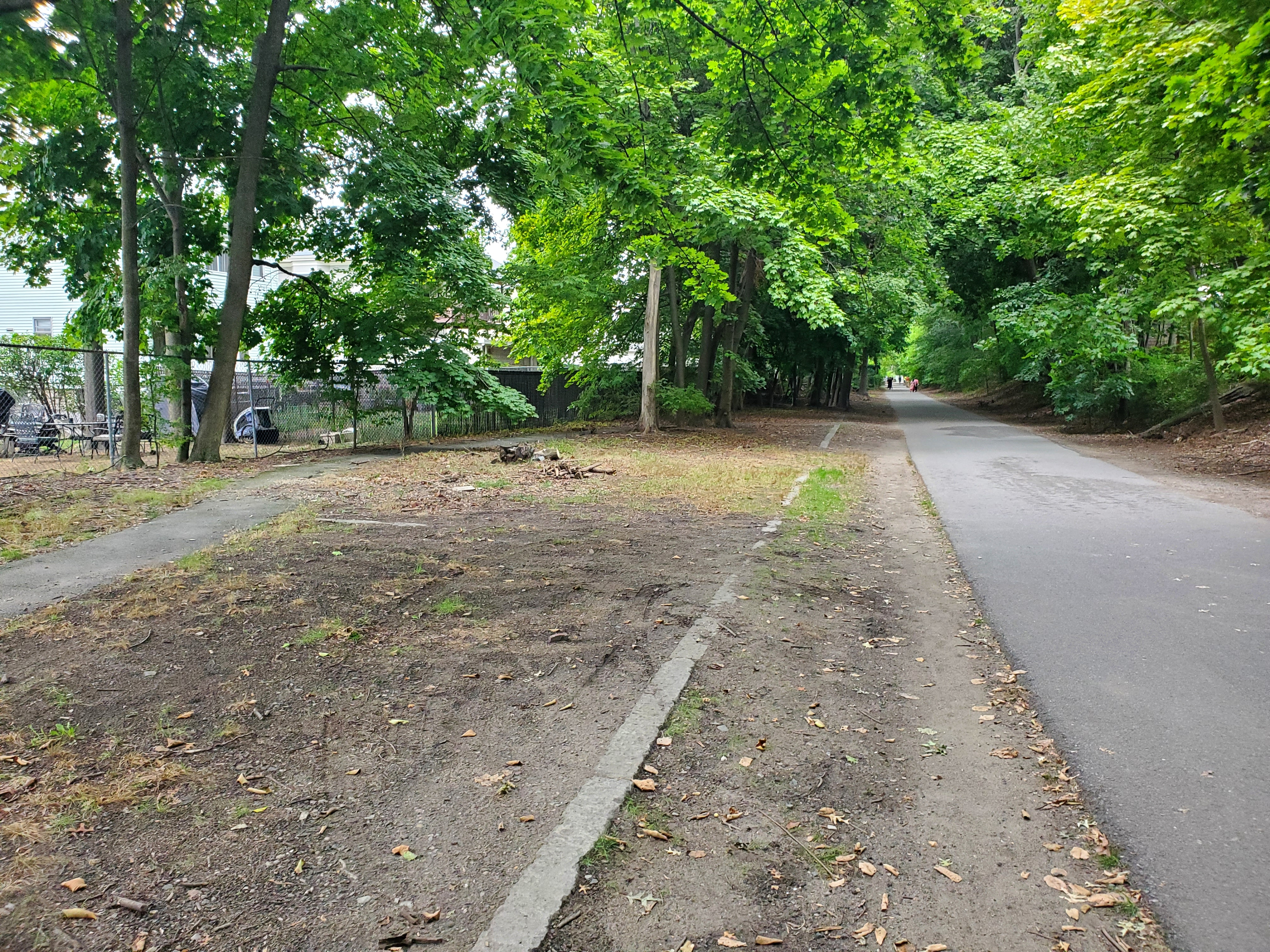
The former station site and the Minuteman Bikeway in 2022, with the old platform edge visible

By 1950, the Lexington Branch had three daily round trips, one of which was discontinued within several years. On April 18, 1958, the B&M received permission from the Massachusetts Public Utilities Commission to drastically curtail its suburban commuter service, including abandoning branches, closing stations, and cutting trains. Among the approved cuts was the closure of four stations on the Lexington Branch in Arlington—Lake Street, Arlington, Brattles, and Arlington Heights—because Arlington was part of the funding district of the Metropolitan Transit Authority, which provided parallel bus service on Massachusetts Avenue. The four stations, with collective daily ridership around 200 passengers, were closed on May 16, 1958. The Lexington Branch was reduced to a single daily round trip at that time.

Lake Street station was demolished prior to 1959; the only surviving stations of the Lexington Branch are Bedford and Lexington. The Massachusetts Bay Transportation Authority (MBTA) was formed in August 1964 to subsidize suburban rail service. MBTA subsidies for B&M service began on January 4, 1965. Although the MBTA initially planned to close the Lexington Branch, the single round trip was retained.

Due to community input, Arlington station was reopened in October 1965, followed by Lake Street in March 1968. Ridership at Lake Street station generally did not exceed 10 passengers per day. Although taking the Lexington Branch allowed a faster trip than taking a bus to Harvard (then the northwestern terminus of the Red Line) and then transferring to the Red Line to get to downtown Boston, it had only the single round trip and was substantially more expensive. The MBTA purchased most B&M commuter lines, including the Lexington Branch, on December 27, 1976.

After a major snowstorm temporarily closed the line on January 10, 1977, Lexington Branch passenger service was permanently ended. At that time, the MBTA planned to extend the Red Line along the Lexington Branch right-of-way to Arlington Heights. Stations were to be at Porter, Davis, Alewife, Arlington, and Arlington Heights; Lake Street would not have been a stop. However, by the time construction began in 1978, opposition in Arlington and reductions in federal funding had caused the MBTA to choose a shorter alternative with Alewife as the terminus. Freight service on the Lexington Branch continued until 1981; it was abandoned in 1991. The Minuteman Bikeway was constructed on the abandoned right-of-way, with the section through Arlington opening in 1992.
