= Lexington and West Cambridge Railroad =

Railroad in Massachusetts, US

Map of the Lexington and West Cambridge and later extensions

The Lexington and West Cambridge Railroad was a railroad company chartered in 1845 and opened in 1846 that operated in eastern Massachusetts. It and its successors provided passenger service until 1977 and freight service until 1980 or early 1981.

== History ==
=== 19th century ===
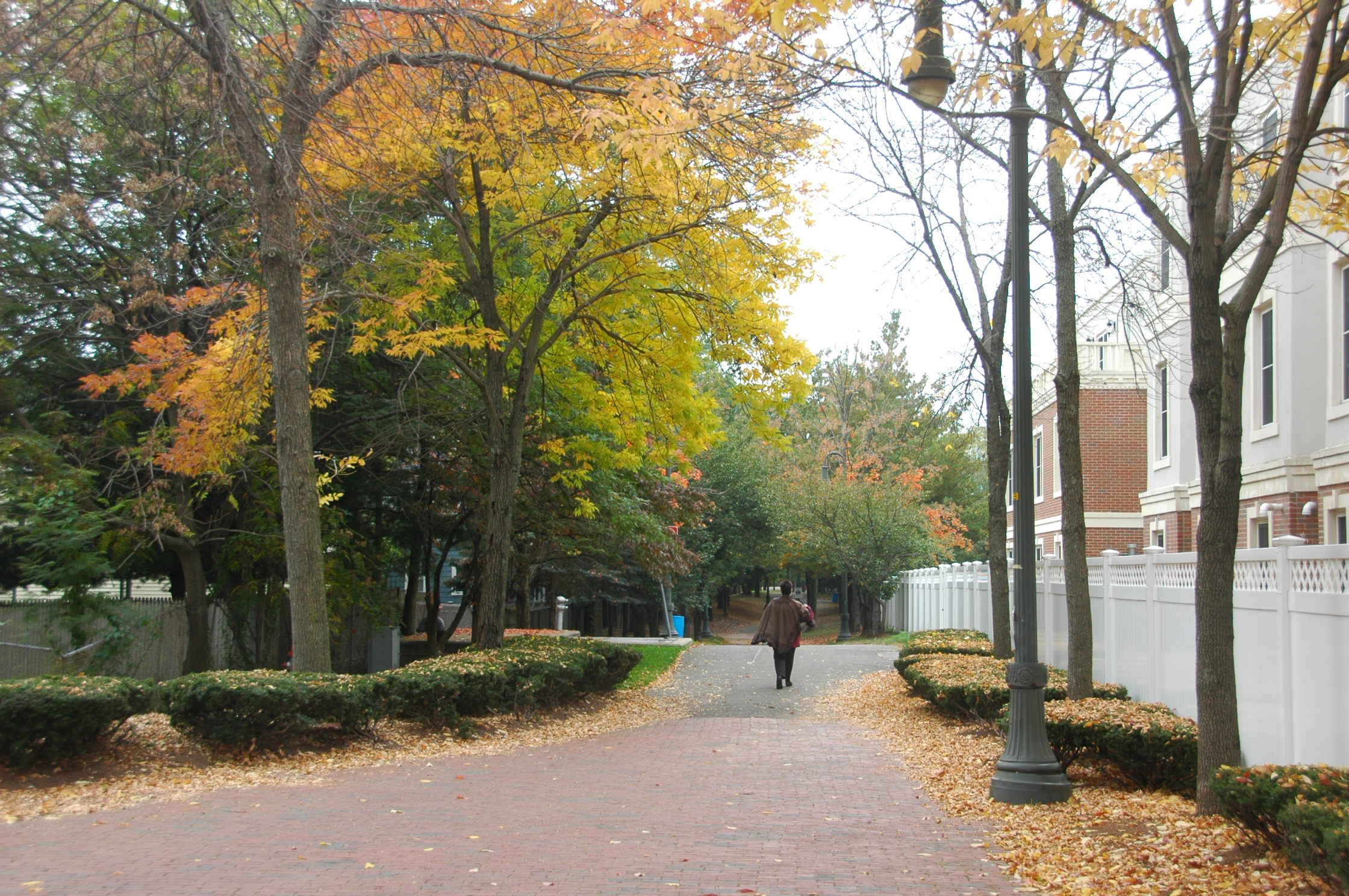
Alewife Linear Park, near the corner of Cedar Street and Massachusetts Avenue, Cambridge. When the passenger trains ran here, the North Cambridge station stood in the foreground, on the right, and the intersection was called "North Cambridge Junction".

A single track line was constructed in 1845–46, connecting Lexington Center to the Fitchburg Railroad, now the MBTA's Fitchburg Line) in West Cambridge (near the site of the modern Alewife Station). When the separate town of West Cambridge changed its name to Arlington in 1867, the railroad was also renamed, as the Lexington and Arlington Railroad.

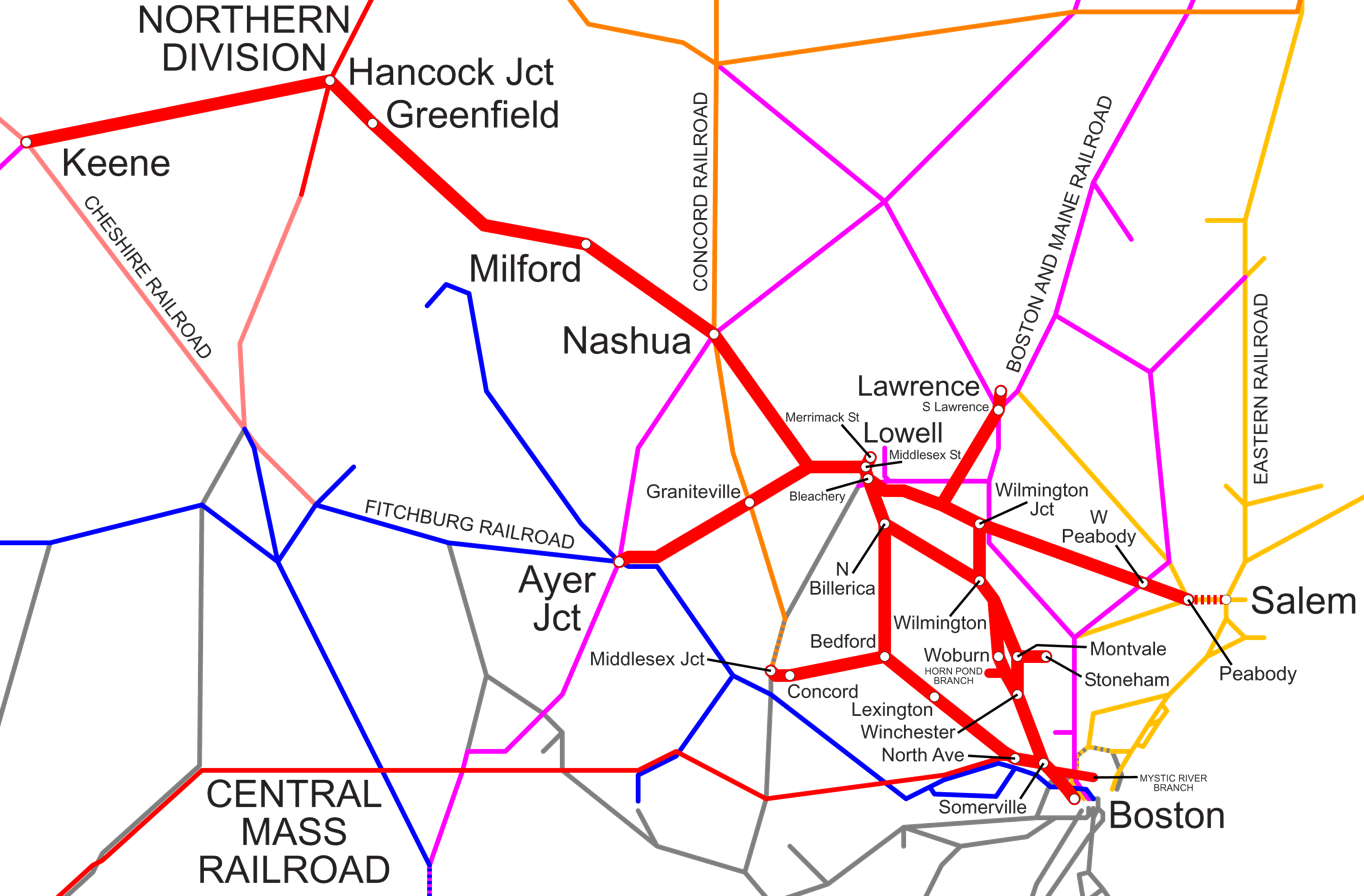
Boston and Lowell Railroad in 1887, just before its merger into the Boston and Maine Railroad

The Boston and Lowell Railroad purchased the line in 1870 and built a new connection (most of which would constitute a major portion of the later Fitchburg Cutoff) to their main line at Somerville Junction. The connection, from what is now the Magnolia Field-Varnum Street area in Arlington, ran through North Cambridge and West Somerville (Davis Square); a station was located at Somerville Junction, commemorated by a park near what are now Centre and Woodbine Streets. The Boston and Lowell created a subsidiary, the Middlesex Central Railroad, to build an extension from Lexington to Bedford and then Concord Center (Lowell Road), which opened in 1873. The Lowell Road station was adjacent to today's Minuteman National Historical Park. A 2.5-mile (4.0 km) extension from Concord Center to Concord Prison (Reformatory Station on Elm Street) would give the name Reformatory Branch to the Bedford-Concord segment in 1879. The branch continued another half mile further west to a junction (called "Concord Junction" or "Middlesex Junction" per different sources) with the Nashua, Acton & Boston Railroad and other rail lines.

The independent Billerica and Bedford Railroad built a connecting narrow-gauge line in 1877, but went bankrupt the next year. In 1885, the Middlesex Central purchased the right-of-way and used it to build a standard-gauge extension to North Billerica from Bedford. The North Billerica–Boston segment was known as the Lexington Branch. In 1888, Willow Street station and Somerville Highlands station (at Cedar Street) were consolidated at Highland Road, retaining the Somerville Highlands name.

The Boston and Maine Railroad purchased all of the Boston and Lowell in 1887. Double-tracking from Somerville Junction to Lexington was instituted just prior to the B&M era, in 1885–86, and discontinued in 1927. Double width bridge abutments can be found in Arlington. The branch eventually ended service, as it had begun, as a single track line. Grade crossings from Grove Street in Arlington Center to Park Avenue at Arlington Heights were eliminated in 1900, with modifications to Arlington Heights and Brattles stations.

=== 20th century ===
Around the turn of the 20th century, there were 19 daily round trips through Arlington. In January 1926, the B&M proposed to cut 7 of the 10 remaining round trips; all service to Lake Street, North Cambridge, West Somerville, and Somerville Highlands was to end. The B&M reached an agreement with a committee representing several municipalities in March, and with Somerville in April. Five daily round trips (six on Saturdays) were kept, including one round trip to Lowell; some service was maintained to the four stations. This schedule took effect on April 26, at which time two trains were given names - the Patriot and the Paul Revere Express. Later that year, the B&M began reconstruction of the original route between East Arlington and the Fitchburg mainline as part of reconstruction of its Boston terminal area. On April 24, 1927, passenger service was rerouted over the rebuilt line; the Fitchburg Cutoff became freight-only, with North Cambridge, West Somerville, and Somerville Highlands stations closed.

On April 24, 1926, the state approved discontinuance of passenger service on the Reformatory Branch. On February 5, 1927, the remaining freight service was abandoned on the short segment between Concord station and Reformatory station. On December 31, 1931, passenger service on the outer Lexington Branch from Bedford and North Billerica was discontinued. Remaining services were converted from steam to diesel trains in 1956. In 1958, all four stations in Arlington were closed as part of massive B&M service cuts; ridership was low because bus service on Massachusetts Avenue was more frequent and often faster. By popular request, Arlington Centre was reopened in October 1965, and Lake Street in March 1968.

In 1962, the Boston and Maine abandoned both segments north and west of Bedford. It was noted at the time that the Bedford-Concord section had only seen 19 trains in 19 years. The town of Bedford purchased the rights of way within its boundaries in 1963.

By 1965, the Massachusetts Bay Transportation Authority was subsidizing a single daily passenger train (using Budd Rail Diesel Cars) between Boston and Bedford. On December 26, 1976, the MBTA purchased the rights of way and passenger equipment from the Boston and Maine (which retained freight trackage rights). Operation of MBTA Commuter Rail was contracted at that time to the Boston and Maine, and later was awarded to other private companies. Beginning on January 10, 1977, a snowstorm blocked the line for a few days, after which the MBTA announced it would not resume passenger service.

The B&M filed for abandonment of the branch in March 1979; hearings were held a year later. The Interstate Commerce Commission soon gave permission for the B&M to stop running freights on the line. Common power on the branch at that time was SW # 1227. The last freight train to ply the line was hauled by a GP9, with 23 cars. According to one source the final trip was in 1980, and the same year the tracks were severed from the main line. Another source gives the date of the final run as January 31, 1981.

In 1980, a federal judge ruled that the Lexington Branch must be restored after construction of the parking garage at Alewife station over the right-of-way. In 1981, the MBTA entered into an agreement with the Town of Arlington to advocate that the Lexington Branch be abandoned. In return for the MBTA's support for converting the railroad to a bikeway, Arlington allowed the MBTA to use some of its land as a construction staging area for the Red Line extension project.

== Route maps ==
[left]: The full route of the Lexington and West Cambridge Railroad and its successors.

[right]: The final configuration of the Lexington Branch in MBTA service during the winter of 1976–77.

== Rail trails ==
The right-of-way was railbanked in 1991. Although the rails were removed, trackage can be relaid without objection if the MBTA should find it necessary.

The Minuteman Bikeway opened between Alewife and Bedford in 1993. A former Boston and Maine Rail Diesel Car (RDC) of the type used on the line was purchased and is on display at the western end of the trail at Bedford Depot Park.

The Alewife Linear Park (portions of which are also known as the Somerville Community Path and the Cambridge Linear Park) follows the right-of-way used by the Lexington Branch from 1870 to 1927, from Somerville nearly to Alewife. One of the main access points to the Linear Park is situated where the park crosses Massachusetts Avenue, at the intersection with Cedar Street, adjacent to which the North Cambridge station was located.

The Bedford Narrow Gauge Rail Trail connects at Bedford Depot and heads north toward Billerica, passing Fawn Lake (also known as Hayden Pond). The current connection is indirect; the Minuteman ends at South Road, but the Narrow Gauge begins at Loomis Street just east of Hartford Street. The Bedford DPW is planning a more direct, 10-foot (3.0 m) sidewalk connection. It is named after the Billerica and Bedford Railroad, even though a standard-gauge railroad succeeded it. A historical recreation of the narrow-gauge predecessor has been installed near Loomis Street. The trail is paved only from Loomis Street to Great Road; after that it is improved with stone dust. The public portion of the trail ends after five miles (8 km) at the Bedford/Billerica town line (marked with a pair of gates in the middle of the woods), after which it becomes sandy (requiring a mountain bike or walking on foot) and continues on private property. The Bedford section of the trail was originally constructed (with stone dust) in 1998.

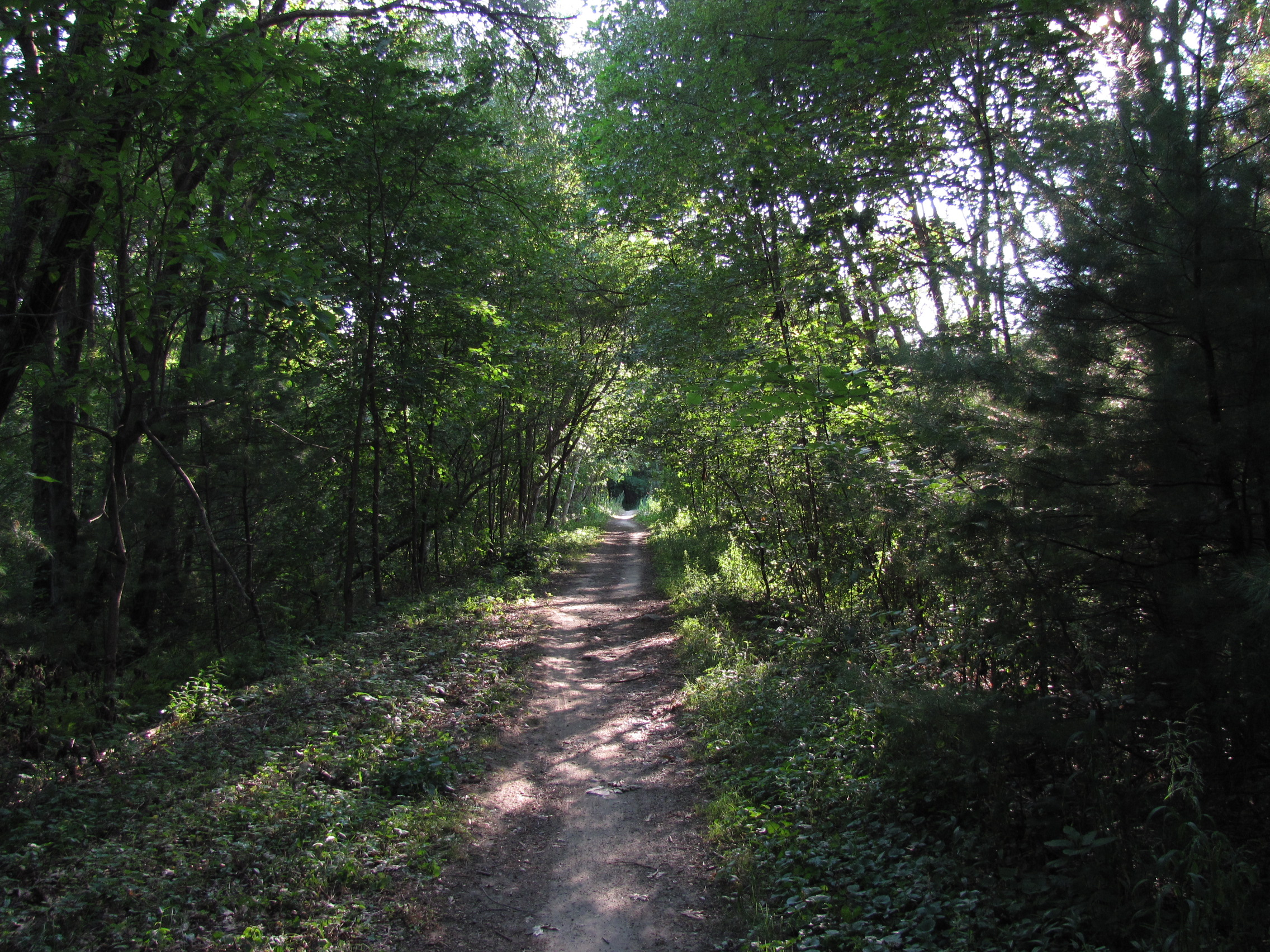
Reformatory Branch Rail Trail in Bedford

The Reformatory Branch Rail Trail follows the old right-of-way from Railroad Avenue at Bedford Depot Park to Concord, though the bridges over the Sudbury River and Assabet River near Egg Rock no longer exist. The unimproved dirt hiking trail passes the Great Meadows National Wildlife Refuge. From Railroad Avenue, it is 4 miles (6.4 km) to Lowell Road in Concord, and then another 2.5 miles (4.0 km) on the other side of the river to the Concord State Prison.

The Narrow Gauge and Reformatory Branch Rail Trails are part of the Bay Circuit Trail and Greenway.
