= Bedford Depot =

Railroad depot in Bedford, Massachusetts

Bedford
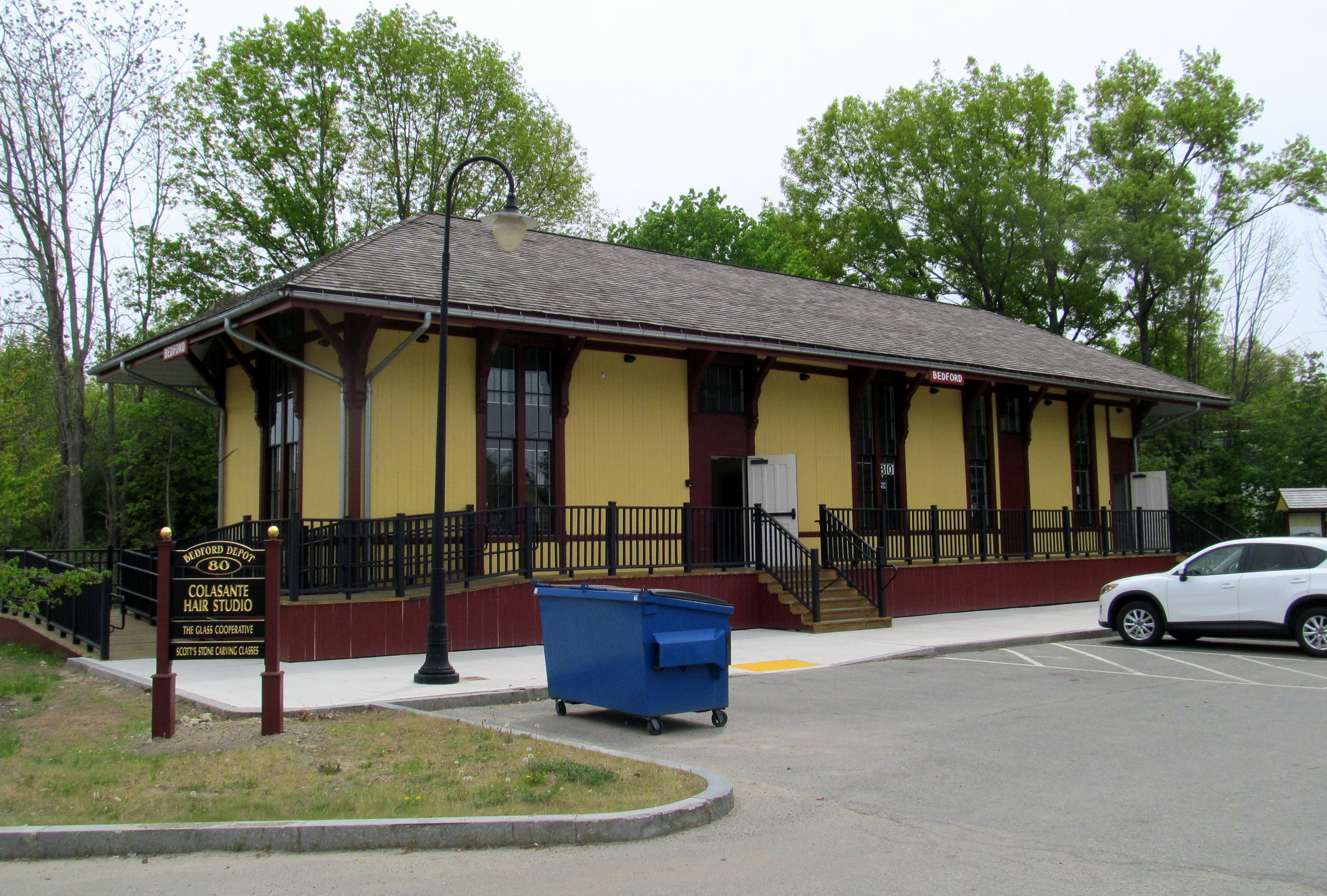
- The former station building in May 2015

General information
- Location: 80 Loomis Street, Bedford, Massachusetts, United States
- Coordinates: 42°29′9.45″N 71°16′33.65″W

Construction
- Architectural style: Late Victorian

Other information
- Fare zone: 3

History
- Opened: 1846
- Closed: January 10, 1977
- Rebuilt: 1874

Former services
Preceding station	MBTA	Following station
Terminus	Lexington Branch	North Lexington toward North Station
Preceding station	Boston and Maine Railroad	Following station
Bedford Springs toward Lowell	Lexington Branch	North Lexington toward Boston
Lowell Road toward Reformatory	Lexington Branch	North Lexington toward Boston
- Bedford Depot
- U.S. National Register of Historic Places
- U.S. Historic district
- NRHP reference No.: 03000791
- Added to NRHP: August 21, 2003
Location

Bedford Depot is a historic railroad depot in Bedford, Massachusetts, United States. Bedford was the junction of the Reformatory Branch and the Lexington Branch of the Boston and Maine Railroad; it saw passenger service until 1977 as the stub of the Lexington Branch. The original 1874 depot and 1877 freight house are listed on the National Register of Historic Places; along with a restored Budd Rail Diesel Car, they form the centerpieces of the Bedford Depot Park.

== History ==
=== Early service ===
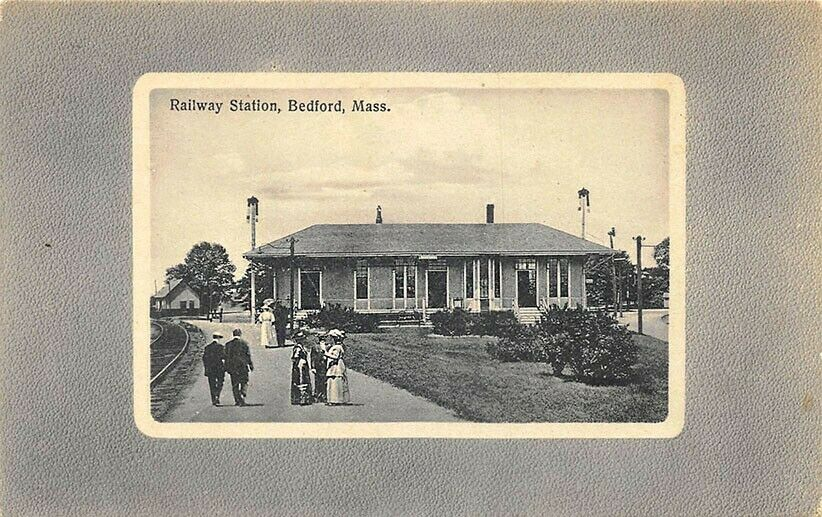
An early-20th-century postcard of the station

The Lexington and West Cambridge Railroad was built to what is now Lexington Center in 1845–46, and bought by the Boston and Lowell Railroad in 1870 in order to prevent the line from building an alternate route to Lowell via Bedford. In August 1873, the subsidiary Middlesex Central Railroad opened an extension to Concord Center via Bedford. A Victorian-style passenger station was built in 1874.

In 1877, the Billerica and Bedford Railroad, a 2 ft (610 mm) narrow-gauge line, opened from Bedford Depot to North Billerica. The line built a two-stall engine house and a turntable at the Bedford terminus. The Billerica and Bedford was markedly unsuccessful, and closed down in 1878. In 1879, the Middlesex Central was extended to Reformatory station in Concord; this permitted short-lived through service to Nashua via a connection to the Nashua, Acton, and Boston Railroad. In 1885, the Boston & Lowell rebuilt the route to Billerica as part of their standard gauge network. The depot, originally west of South Road, was moved to its present location at the junction. The narrow gauge engine house was also moved and turned into a freight depot. Two years later, the Boston and Maine Railroad absorbed the Boston & Lowell, including the two routes through Bedford.

=== Decline ===
After the Cambridge subway opened in 1912, streetcar lines connecting at Harvard Square began to siphon off passenger traffic from the northwestern suburban lines. Within six years, about half of Lexington Branch trains (through trains from Reformatory and Lowell, plus short turns from Bedford, Lexington, and Arlington) had been cut from schedules. Passenger service ended on the Reformatory Branch in 1926, and on the Lexington Branch beyond Bedford in 1933, though freight service continued for several more decades. A wye with an engine house in the center was built just west of the station around this time to turn trains. By 1950 service was down to three daily round trips from Bedford; this decreased to two several years later and one on May 18, 1958. When the newly formed MBTA began subsidizing B&M commuter service in 1965, the MBTA intended to drop the single Lexington Branch and Central Mass Branch round trips, but they were instead kept.

On January 10, 1977, a major snowstorm blocked the line for several days. The MBTA decided then to discontinue service on the lightly used and poorly maintained line. After lawsuits, the MBTA agreed to help construct the Minuteman Bike Path from Alewife to Bedford in exchange for being released from requirements to restore service. The trail was to be constructed so as not to preclude future restoration, nor an extension of the MBTA Red Line along the corridor. However, local opposition in Arlington prevented such a subway extension (which might have terminated in Arlington, Lexington, or even Bedford at a Route 128 park-and-ride station).

=== NRHP and RDC #6211 ===
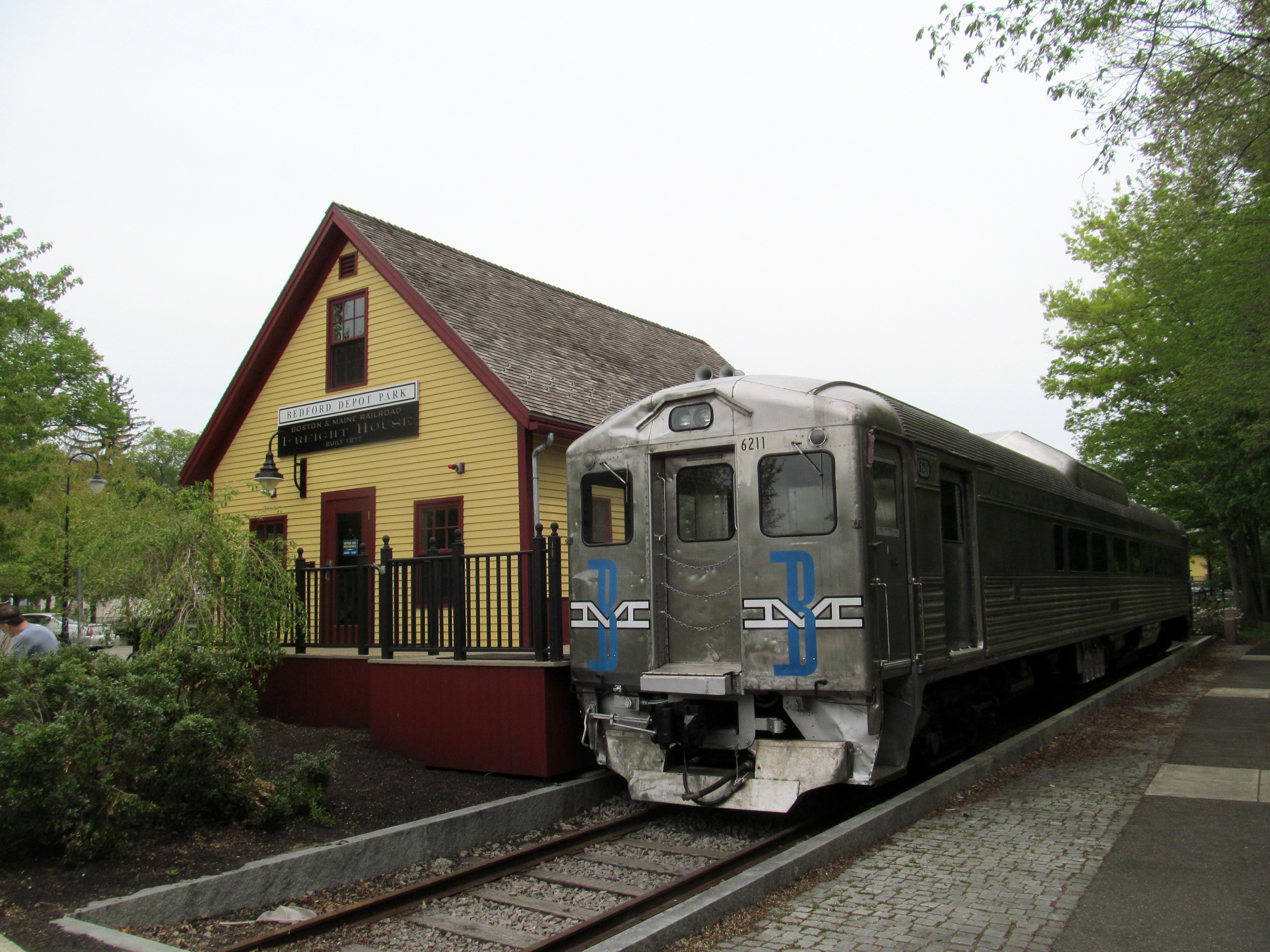
RDC #6211 and the former freight house next to the Minuteman Bikeway in 2015

The depot and freight house were sold by the B&M to private businesses in the 1950s, and a second story was added to the depot in the 1960s. The town of Bedford purchased both in 1999, following a four-year effort by the Friends of Bedford Depot Park, and restored them as the centerpieces of the Bedford Depot Park. They were listed on the National Register of Historic Places in 2003 as part of the Bedford Depot Park Historic District. The freight house received a $350,000 renovation from 2006 to 2008 and serves as a museum run by the Friends; the depot continues to house private businesses.

In 1998, Budd Rail Diesel Car #6211, an ex-B&M car that had been used for Lexington Branch service decades earlier, was brought from Billerica Repair Shops to the former railroad yard west of South Road for rehabilitation. The $125,000 project, funded by the town and done under the watch of a former B&M worker, restored the car to its original specifications but not to running condition. In 2003, the car was moved across South Road to its present location next to the freight house.
