= Tower Hill station (Boston and Maine Railroad) =

Former train station in Wayland, Massachusetts

Tower Hill
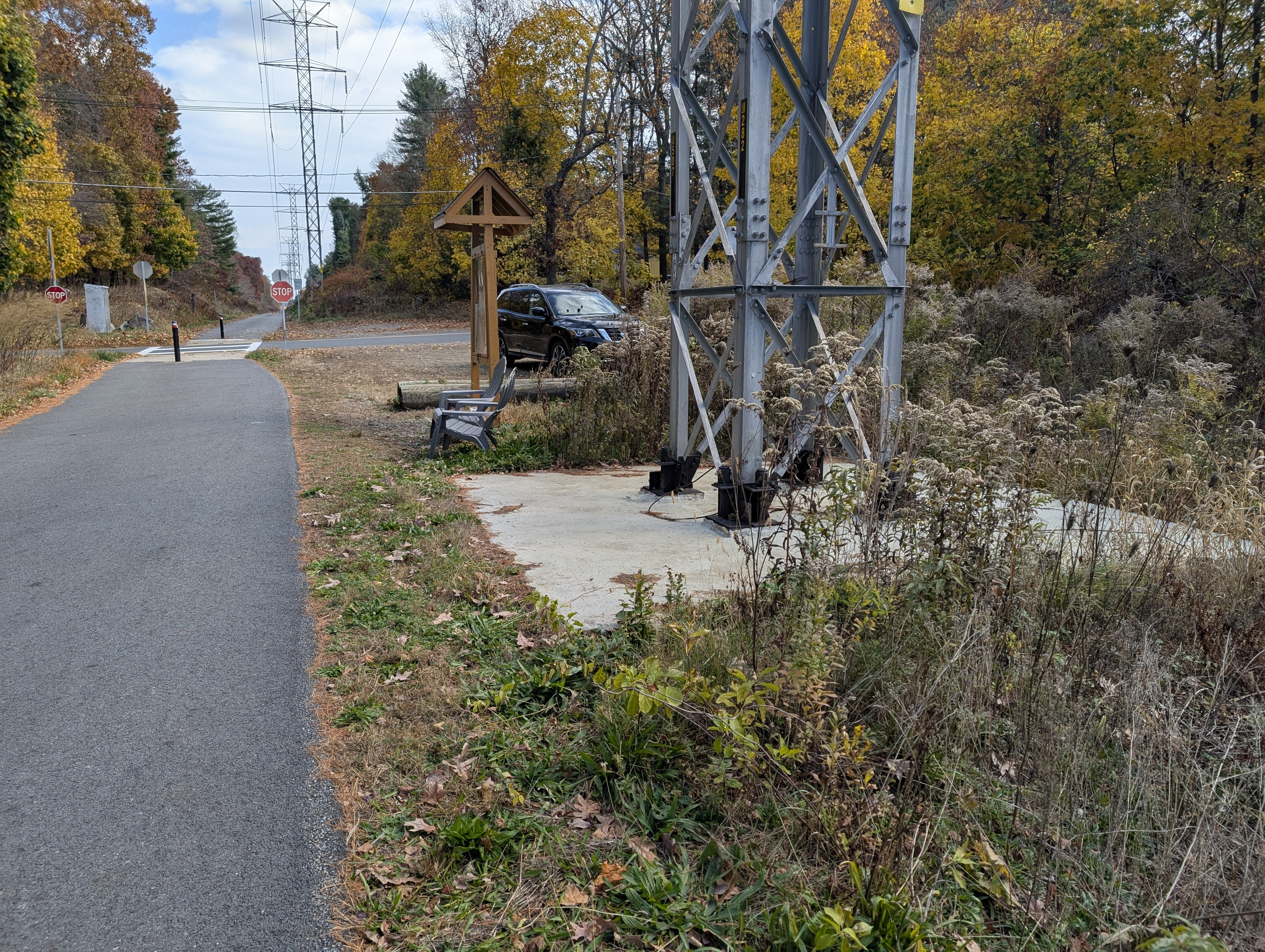
- The former site of Tower Hill station in November 2024

General information
- Location: Wayland, Massachusetts
- Coordinates: 42.367227°N 71.337854°W
- Owner: MBTA
- Lines: Massachusetts Central Railroad; Central Massachusetts Branch (Boston & Maine); Central Mass Branch (MBTA)
- Platforms: 1
- Tracks: 1

History
- Opened: October 1, 1881
- Closed: Closed December 31, 1920 (2nd station); Demolished 1960s (2nd station); Service ended November 26, 1971 (shelter); Demolished 1996 (shelter)
- Rebuilt: 1890s (2nd station); 1950s (shelter)

Former services
| Preceding station | MBTA | Following station |
|---|---|---|
| Wayland toward South Sudbury | Central Mass Branch (closed 1971) | Cherry Brook toward North Station |
| Preceding station | Boston and Maine Railroad | Following station |
| Wayland toward Northampton | Central Mass Branch | Cherry Brook toward Boston |
Location

Tower Hill station was a former train station in Wayland, Massachusetts near Plain Road.

== Background ==
Tower Hill station was created by the Massachusetts Central Railroad on October 1, 1881. By 1885 the successor Central Massachusetts Railroad provided service, and by 1887 the Boston and Maine Railroad (B&M) leased the ROW and named it the Central Massachusetts Branch. B&M service was subsidized by the MBTA and added to the MBTA Commuter Rail system in 1965.

The original station burned down in the 1890s. The replacement station was in operation until December 31, 1920. It was designed in the same general style as the nearby Weston and Wayland stations, but without roof overhangs on the ends. In the early 1950s B&M built a simple wooden open-air shelter for passengers between the closed station and the tracks. About ten years later B&M tore down the station but passengers could still use the shelter stop.

Service on the Central Mass Branch was terminated on November 26, 1971 due to poor track conditions and low ridership. Finally the derelict shelter was demolished in 1996 after years of neglect and vandalism.

In 2019, a paved section of the Mass Central Rail Trail—Wayside was built over the section of the ROW the station was built to service.

In 2024, the Tower Hill signal cabinet, formerly used to control lights and a bell warning vehicles on Plain Road that a train was approaching, was repaired and given an interpretive, historical vinyl wrap by the Wayland Cultural Council.
