= Weston station (Boston and Maine Railroad) =

Weston
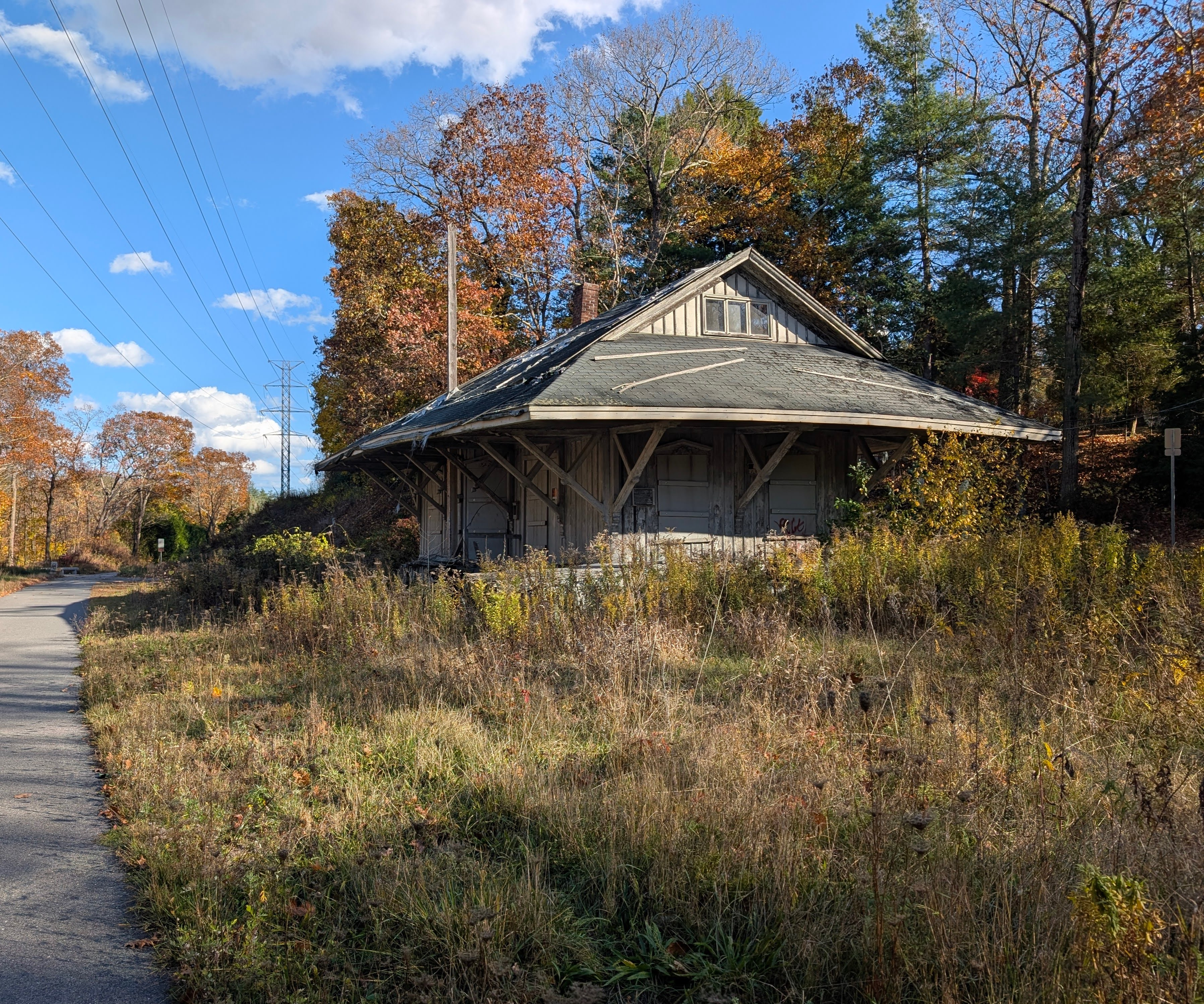
- The disused station building at Weston in November 2024

General information
- Location: 55 Church Street; Weston, Massachusetts
- Coordinates: 42.371809°N 71.293365°W
- Owner: Friends of the Weston Depot (nonprofit)
- Lines: Massachusetts Central Railroad; Central Massachusetts Branch (Boston & Maine); Central Mass Branch (MBTA)
- Platforms: 1
- Tracks: 1

History
- Opened: October 1, 1881
- Closed: November 26, 1971

Former services
Preceding station	MBTA	Following station
Cherry Brook toward South Sudbury	Central Mass Branch (closed 1971)	Waltham Highlands toward North Station
Preceding station	Boston and Maine Railroad	Following station
Cherry Brook toward Northampton	Central Mass Branch	Waltham Highlands toward Boston
Location

Weston station, also known as Weston depot, is a former railroad station in Weston, Massachusetts. Located at 55 Church Street in the Weston town center, it was originally built by the Massachusetts Central Railroad which constructed it in the board-and-batten style prior to the railroad's opening in 1881. By 1885 it was operated by the successor Central Massachusetts Railroad.

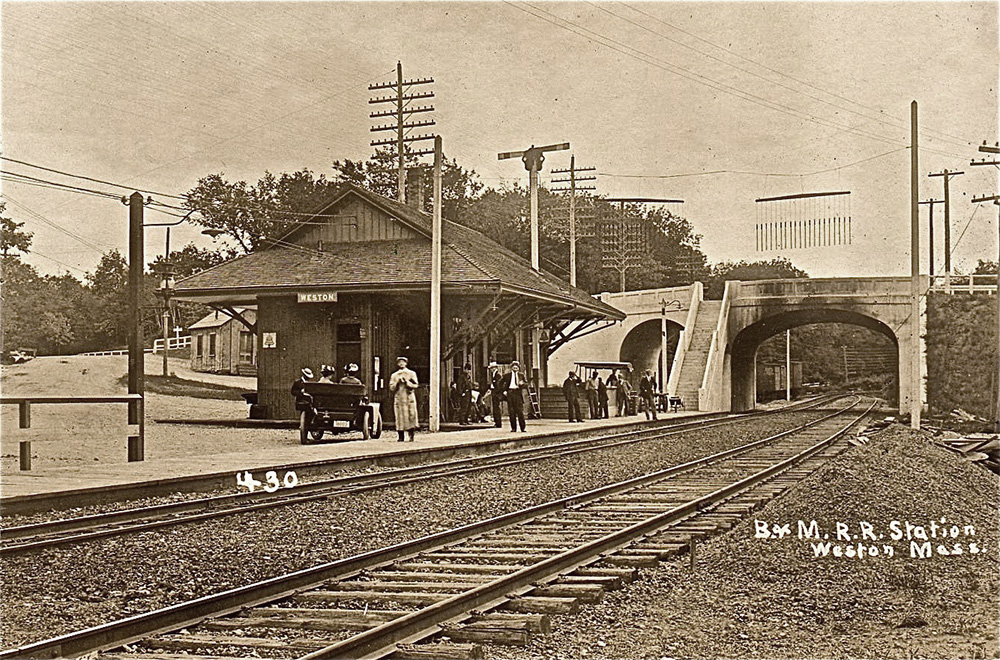
Weston Station, shortly after bridge construction.

The depot was initially located just west of two grade crossings, but was moved several hundred feet east along the track during a 1912 grade crossing elimination project by the Boston & Maine Railroad.

The depot no longer had a station agent as of February 11, 1954. The structure was then closed to passengers, although the platform remained active. The building was reused by a news agency by 1962, by which time it and Kendal Green station had the same private owner. Boston and Maine Railroad service was subsidized by the MBTA and added to the MBTA Commuter Rail system in 1965. The station closed on November 26, 1971, when passenger service on the Central Mass Branch was terminated due to poor track conditions and low ridership.

On June 10th, 1985 Weston was rented to Boston TV Channel 4 as the set for the final scene of an original drama, Tender Places. This episode of the For Kids' Sake series featured Jean Stapleton as a "kindly bag-lady", and premiered in December 1985.

The station is located below grade, with a staircase leading from the Church Street overpass to the station. The station building and staircase were still extant as of 2018, and are still in disrepair. In 2019, a paved section of the Mass Central Rail Trail—Wayside was built over the section of the ROW the station was built to service. In 2022, Weston station was listed on the Massachusetts Most Endangered Historic Resources Program, in an attempt to identify preservation opportunities.

In May 2025, a nonprofit Friends of the Weston Depot was formed, attempting to preserve the building and find a new use for it. The structure transferred to the ownership of the Friends of the Weston Depot on December 30, 2025.
