= East Sudbury station =

Former train station in Sudbury, Massachusetts

East Sudbury
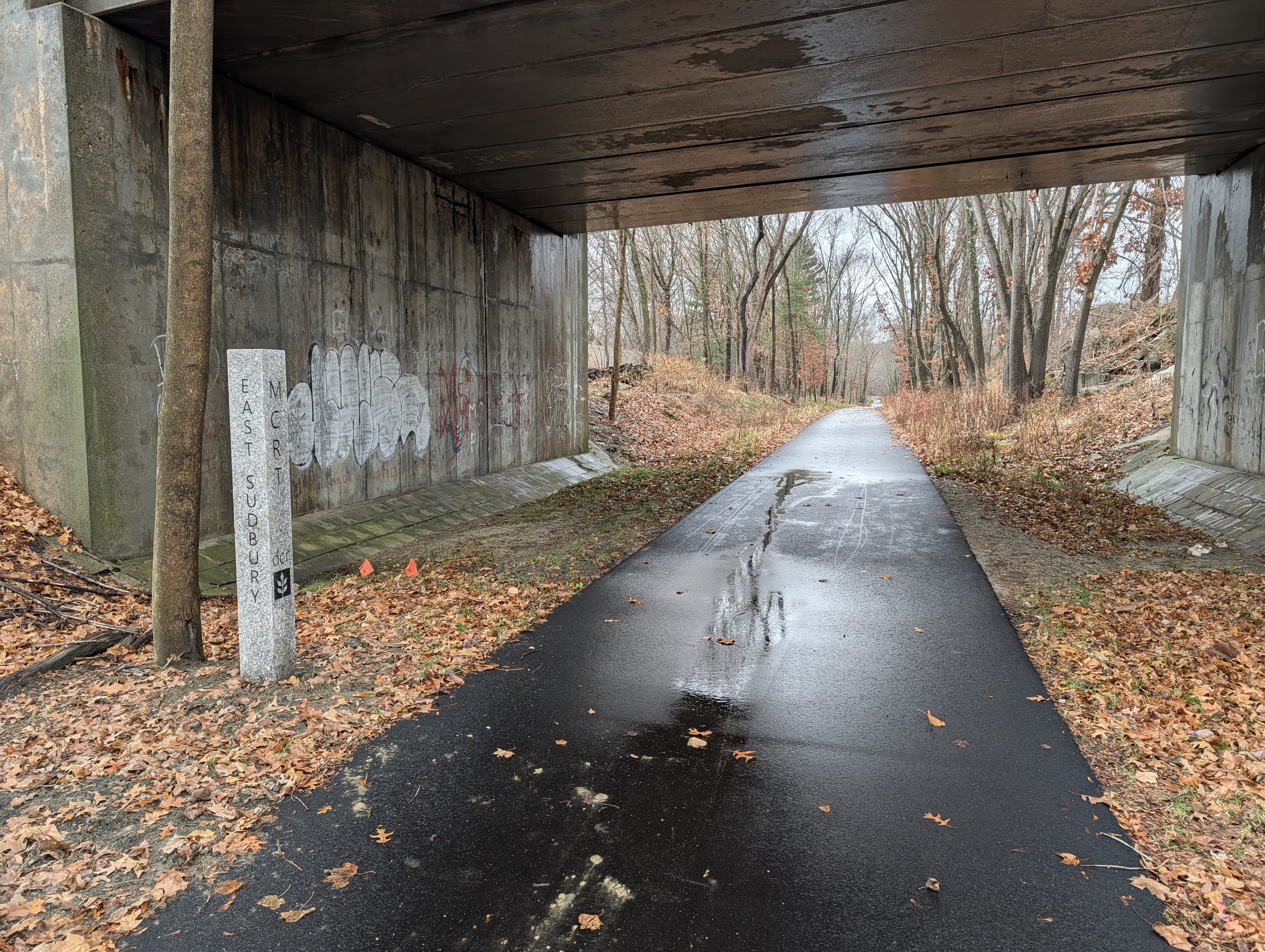
- The former station site in November 2025

General information
- Location: Sudbury, Massachusetts
- Coordinates: 42.360453°N 71.401746°W
- Owner: MBTA
- Lines: Central Massachusetts Branch (Boston & Maine); Central Mass Branch (MBTA)
- Platforms: 1 (former)
- Tracks: 1 (former)

History
- Opened: Before December 19, 1887
- Closed: November 26, 1971

Former services
Preceding station	MBTA	Following station
South Sudbury Terminus	Central Mass Branch (closed 1971)	Wayland toward North Station
Preceding station	Boston and Maine Railroad	Following station
South Sudbury toward Northampton	Central Mass Branch	Wayland toward Boston
Location

East Sudbury station was a train station in Sudbury, Massachusetts. It was located on the Central Massachusetts Railroad mainline east of the Landham Road overpass.

== History ==
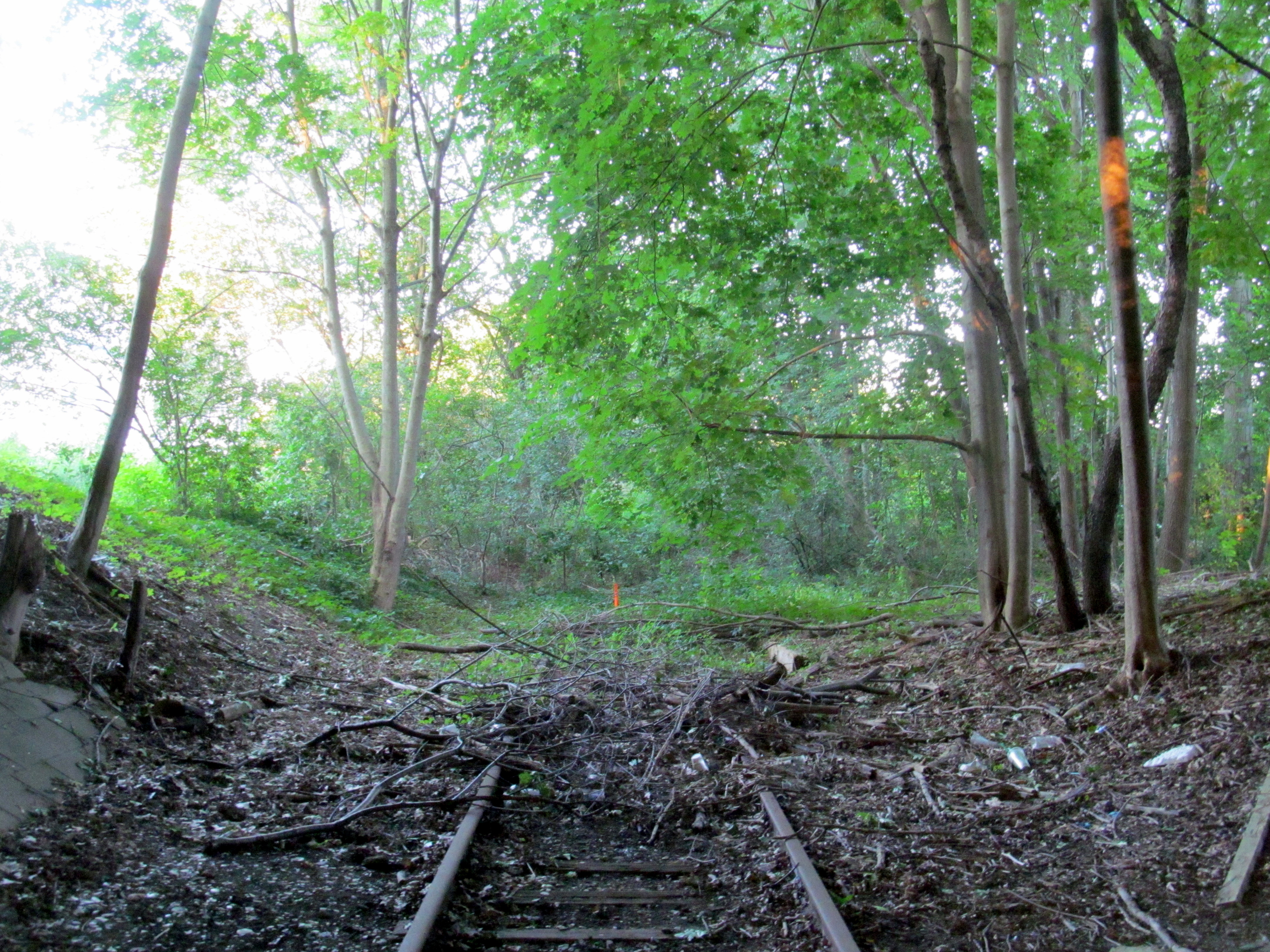
The former station site in 2015 prior to rail trail construction

East Sudbury station was created by the Boston and Maine Railroad (B&M) before December 19, 1887 on the Central Massachusetts Branch. It was unstaffed by 1913 and became a flag stop. B&M service was subsidized by the MBTA and added to the MBTA Commuter Rail system in 1965.

The station was a simple wooden open-air shelter for passengers with a small parking lot.

Service on the Central Mass Branch was terminated on November 26, 1971 due to poor track conditions and low ridership. The shelter has since been demolished.

In 2022, a buried transmission line project between Sudbury and Hudson began construction under the former Central Massachusetts Railroad ROW for which it provided service. This project subsidized the cost of building a section of the Mass Central Rail Trail—Wayside, which completed construction in 2025. As part of this project, DCR installed a granite marker to commemorate the archaeological site.
