= Central Massachusetts Railroad =

Former railroad in Massachusetts

Map

The Central Massachusetts Railroad was a railroad in Massachusetts. The eastern terminus of the line was at North Cambridge Junction where it split off from the Middlesex Central Branch of the Boston and Lowell Railroad in North Cambridge and through which it had access to North Station in Boston. From there, the route ran 98.77 miles west through the modern-day towns of Belmont, Waltham, Weston, Wayland, Sudbury, Hudson, Bolton, Berlin, Clinton, West Boylston, Holden, Rutland, Oakham, Barre, New Braintree, Hardwick, Ware, Palmer, Belchertown, Amherst, and Hadley to its western terminal junction at N. O. Tower in Northampton with the Connecticut River Railroad.

== History ==
=== Inception (1868–1883) ===
In the late 1860s citizens in the towns of Sudbury, Wayland, and Weston petitioned the General Court of Massachusetts to build a railroad through their towns. On February 21, 1868, the state chartered the Wayland and Sudbury Branch Railroad to run 6.75 miles from Mill Village in Sudbury through Wayland to a connection with the Fitchburg Railroad at Stony Brook in Weston. Later that year another group of citizens submitted a petition requesting that the new railroad extend further west to Northampton. On May 10, 1869, the General Court chartered the Massachusetts Central Railroad and united it with the Wayland and Sudbury Branch.

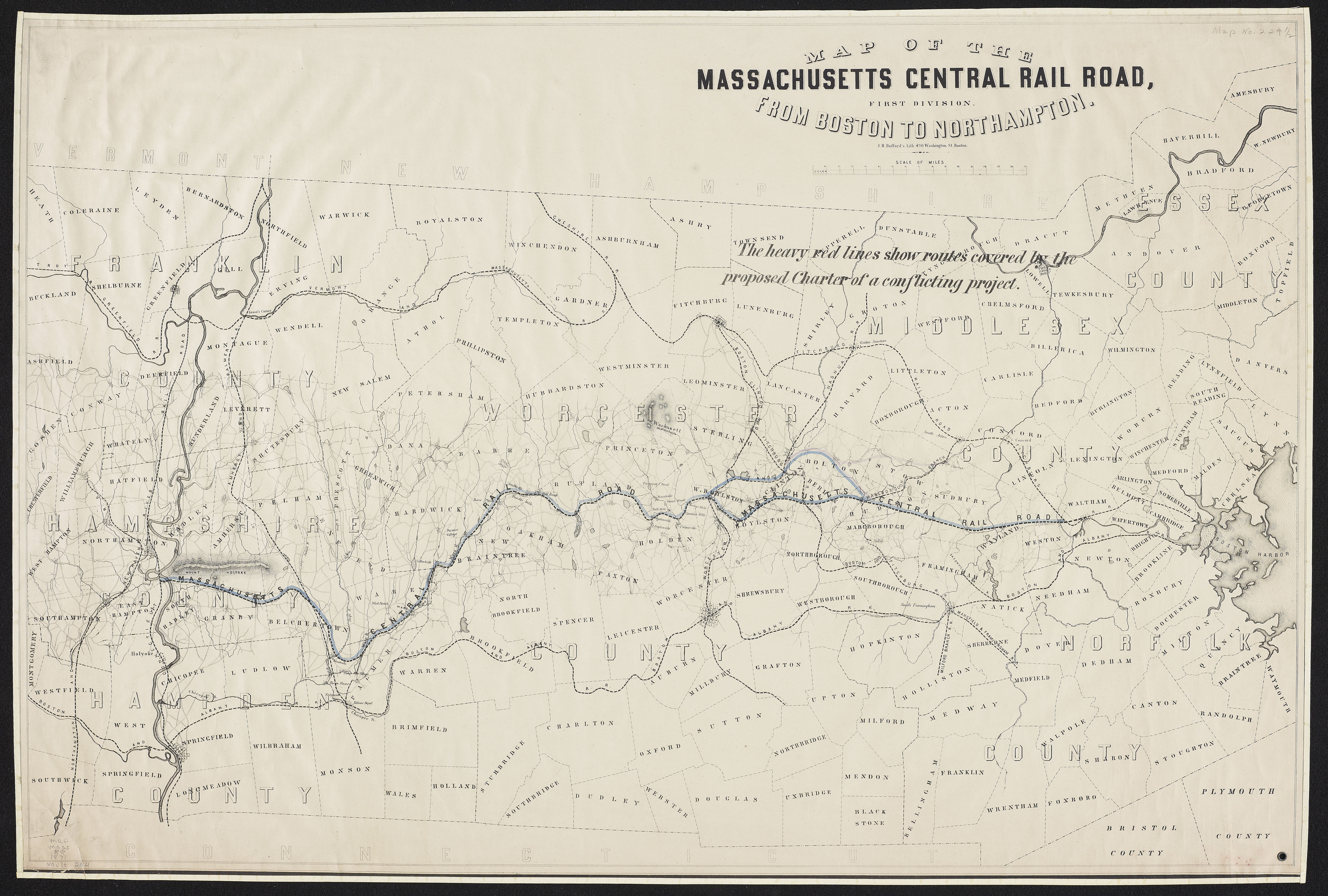
A map of the proposed route of the Massachusetts Central Railroad from 1871

The Massachusetts Central Railroad was organized on September 2, 1869, with James M. Stone of Charlestown elected as its first president. Construction began the following fall despite difficulty in raising capital. The company hired contractor Norman Munson to build the railroad in April 1871. By the summer of 1872 it was reported that work was being done at 30 places from Weston to Northampton. But the Panic of 1873 forced Munson into bankruptcy and halted construction. The railroad stagnated until June 5, 1878, when new president Silas Seymour called a stockholders meeting. The stockholders elected a new Board of Directors which appointed George S. Boutwell president in 1879 and rehired Munson to resume construction.

That same year, the Massachusetts General Court amended the railroad's charter to allow for several new expansions. The most significant was an extension east through Waltham and Belmont, which eliminated the connection with the Fitchburg at Stony Brook. From Beaver Brook to Hill Crossing, the line ran alongside the Fitchburg. Original plans called for the route to briefly parallel the Lexington Branch cutoff through North Cambridge and terminate at the Boston and Lowell Railroad (B&L) mainline at Willow Bridge. However, this was later changed to join the cutoff at North Cambridge Junction, west of North Avenue (now Massachusetts Avenue). Other amendments included a branch from Amherst to a connection with the Troy and Greenfield Railroad in West Deerfield and approval to connect with and build over the route of the never-constructed Holyoke and Belchertown Railroad through Granby and South Hadley.

With its new connection in the east the stockholders approved a 25-year lease of the Massachusetts Central to the B&L on March 21, 1880, pending its completion within two years. The first rails were finally laid in October that same year at the junction with the Framingham and Lowell Railroad in South Sudbury. The route from Cambridge to Hudson was complete by August 20, 1881, and inspected by state and company officials on September 21. Satisfied with the work the officials set the railroad's grand opening for October 1, 1881. The company appointed Munson as general manager and purchased five locomotives. The first schedule included four passenger round trips from Boston to Hudson, four passenger round trips from Boston to Waltham, and a daily freight from Boston to Hudson and back.

Meanwhile, westward construction continued, and the first through train from Jefferson left on December 19, 1881. The inaugural run was marred by a tragedy, striking and killing a 13 year old deaf boy who did not hear the train's approach. Track work west of Jefferson was suspended. In 1883 the selling agents for the company's bonds, Boston-based Charles A. Sweet and Co., declared bankruptcy. The railroad ceased operations and construction on May 16 and remained in limbo for the next 29 months.

=== Resurrection and operation under the Boston & Maine (1883–1902) ===
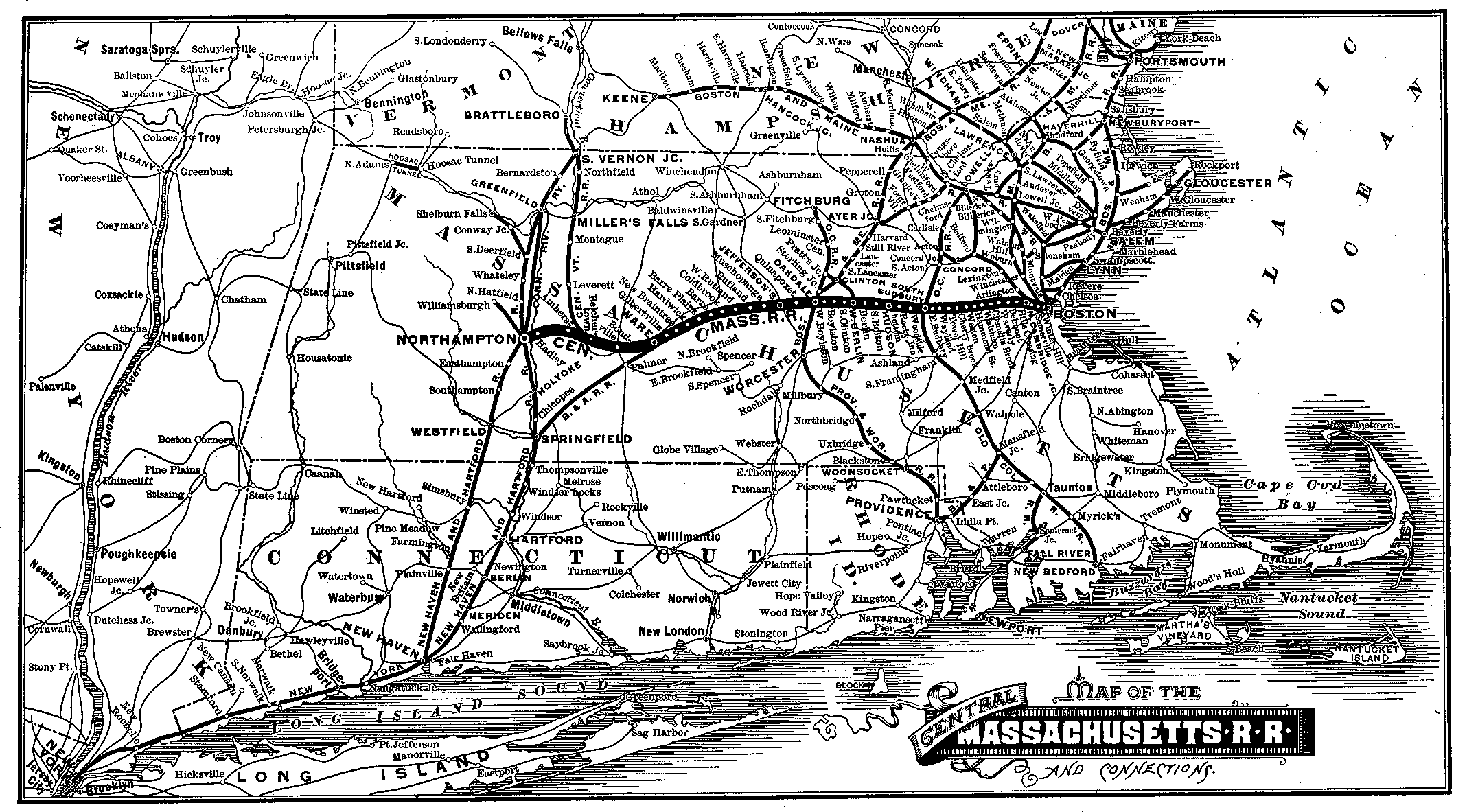
The Central Massachusetts Railroad in 1888.

To restore service to the line the Central Massachusetts Railroad was formed out of the failed Massachusetts Central Railroad Company on November 10, 1883. The directors contracted with the B&L to operate trains over the Central Massachusetts route in the fall of 1885 with service resuming from Boston to Hudson on September 28 and to Jefferson on December 14. The new schedule included seven daily round trips from Boston to Jefferson and another ten to Waltham.

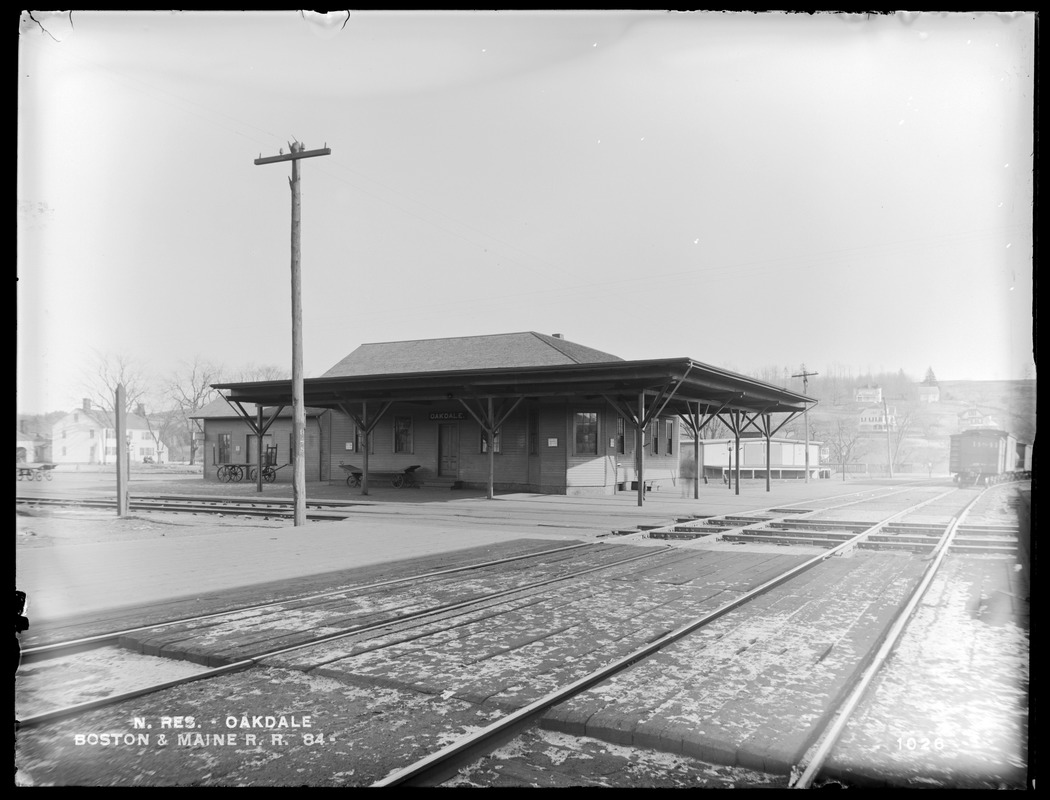
Oakdale Station on January 13, 1897. Accidents were common at the diamond on the right side of the photo where the Central Massachusetts Branch crossed the WN&P Division main line.

The B&L formally leased the Central Massachusetts on December 7, 1886, resuming work on the route to Northampton but abandoning any plans for branches to Holyoke or West Deerfield. Though considerable grading work had already been done along the original planned route in Hardwick, Greenwich, and Enfield the railroad's leadership decided to redirect the route through an easier terrain in the Ware River Valley, taking the line into Palmer and reconnecting with the original route in Belchertown. This turned out to be a fortuitous decision given that much of the disused portion of the line was flooded in the 1930s to construct the Quabbin Reservoir. Tracks were installed through Muschopauge in Rutland by November.

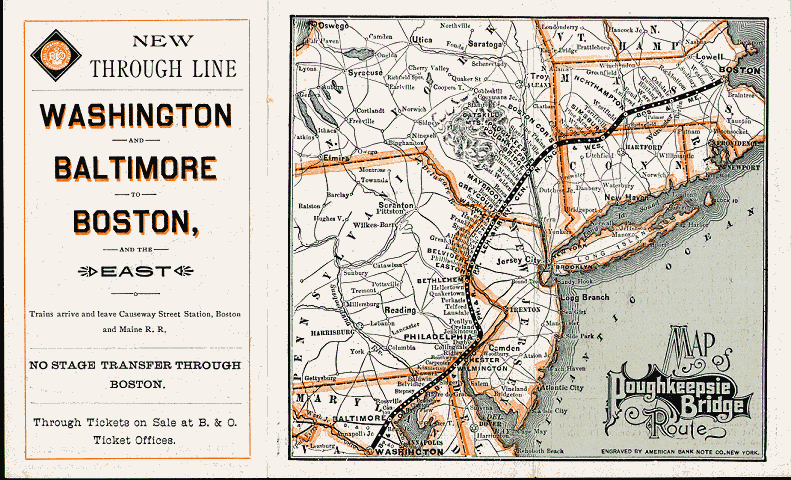
The Central Massachusetts Branch was a major part of the Poughkeepsie Bridge Route, which connected New England with cities beyond New York.

The Boston and Maine Railroad (B&M) leased the B&L on April 1, 1887, renaming the Central Massachusetts line as the Central Massachusetts Branch. The tracks reached Ware on June 27, 1887 and before the end of that year construction finished with the completion of the bridge over the Connecticut River. The first train to traverse the entire route, led by locomotive No. 238, Hudson, left Boston at 8:30 A. M. on December 12 and arrived in Northampton at 12:30 P. M. Revenue service commenced on December 19 with three daily passenger round trips between Boston and Northampton, two between Boston and Hudson, three between Boston and Wayland, and two between Ware and Northampton.

Although the Central Massachusetts Railroad never grew beyond Northampton as its early backers had hoped it nonetheless became an integral link for the B&M to points west and south. This was primarily due to the fact that no rail bridges spanned the North River in New York City, separating New England from major metropolitan areas such as Philadelphia, Baltimore, and Washington, D. C. In 1889 construction of the Poughkeepsie Bridge over the Hudson River at Poughkeepsie, New York completed the Poughkeepsie Bridge Route, the first all-rail route between New England and points south of New York City. Trains such as the Philadelphia and Washington Express and the Harrisburg Express traveled over the several railroads that composed the route, including the Central Massachusetts Branch of the B&M.

With the B&M suddenly such an important link into New England Archibald Angus McLeod, president of the Philadelphia and Reading Railroad (P&R), sought to use the line as part of his bid to control the coal mining traffic between eastern Pennsylvania and New England independent of the New York, New Haven and Hartford Railroad (NYNH&H). In 1892 McLeod took controlling interest of the B&M and of the New York and New England Railroad to fulfill his plan, electing himself president of the B&M on October 26. Early in 1893 the P&R went bankrupt and McLeod lost stock control of the B&M, resigning as president on May 23. With relatively stable local control restored the B&M was able to lease one of its major competitors, the Fitchburg Railroad, in 1900. Two years later, on February 20, 1902, the B&M outright purchased the Central Massachusetts Railroad and dissolved its corporate entity.

With the Central Massachusetts Branch now a part of its system the B&M set about improving the connections between the line and the rest of its network. The first change was in Oakdale where on March 30, 1902, the railroad shut down the accident-prone yard where the Central Massachusetts Branch crossed at grade over the Worcester, Nashua, and Portland Division (WN&P) main line. The next improvement was at Jefferson where the B&M rehabilitated a connecting track that split off of the Central Massachusetts Branch at Holden Junction and connected with the Worcester and Hillsboro Branch at Carr Junction to allow passenger service into Princeton, Hubbardston, Gardner, and Winchendon. Finally the B&M built a connection in Gleasondale from Gleason Junction on the Central Massachusetts Branch to C. M. Junction on the Marlborough Branch to enable passenger service into Marlborough. While traffic into Marlborough flourished, traffic along the connection in Jefferson languished, and in 1909 the B&M took up that track.

=== Wachusett Reservoir Relocation (1902–1907) ===
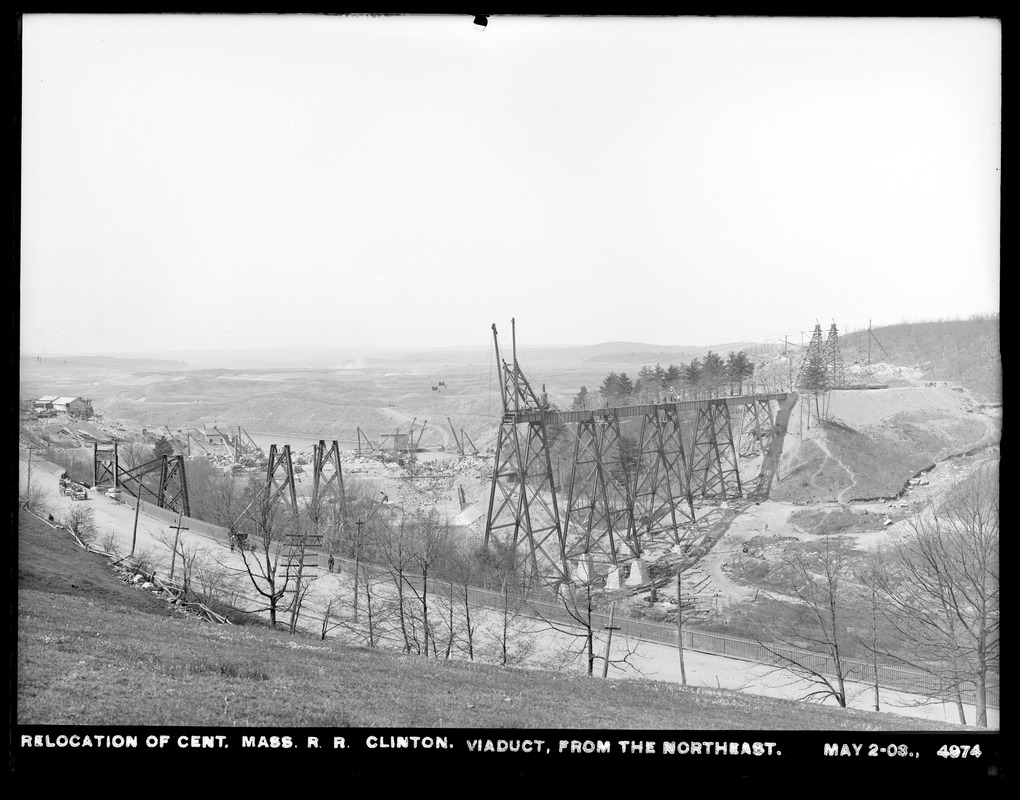
Construction of the Clinton Viaduct on May 2, 1902

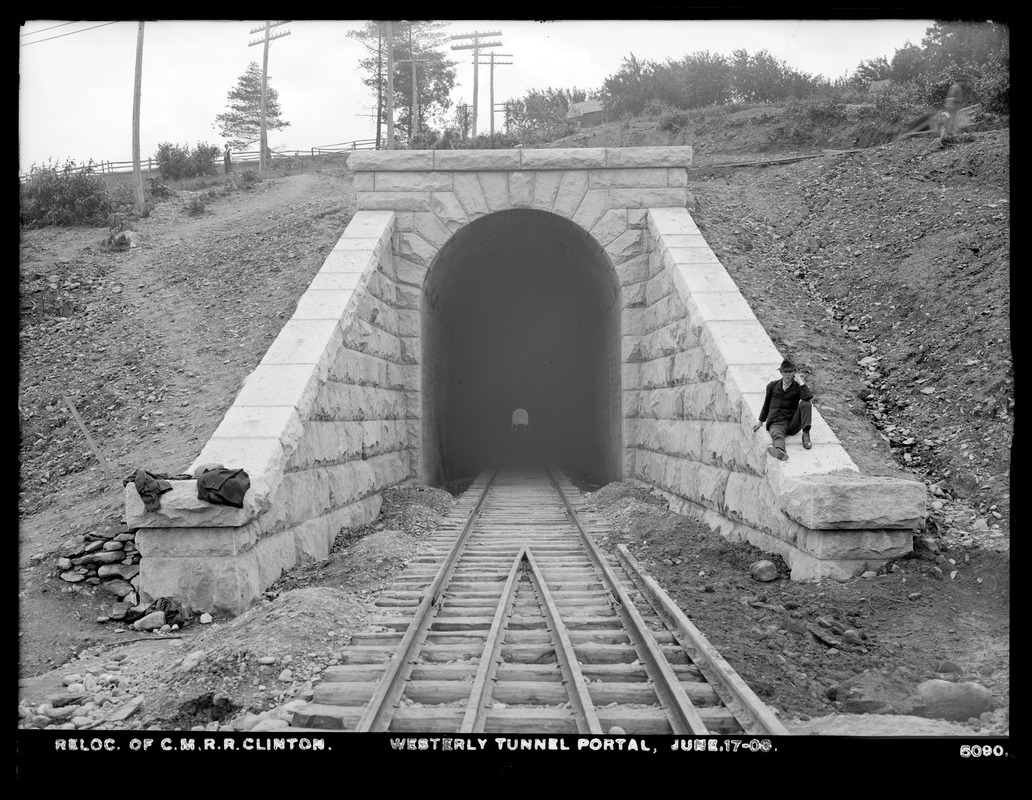
The west portal of the tunnel under Wilson Hill in Clinton on June 17, 1903.

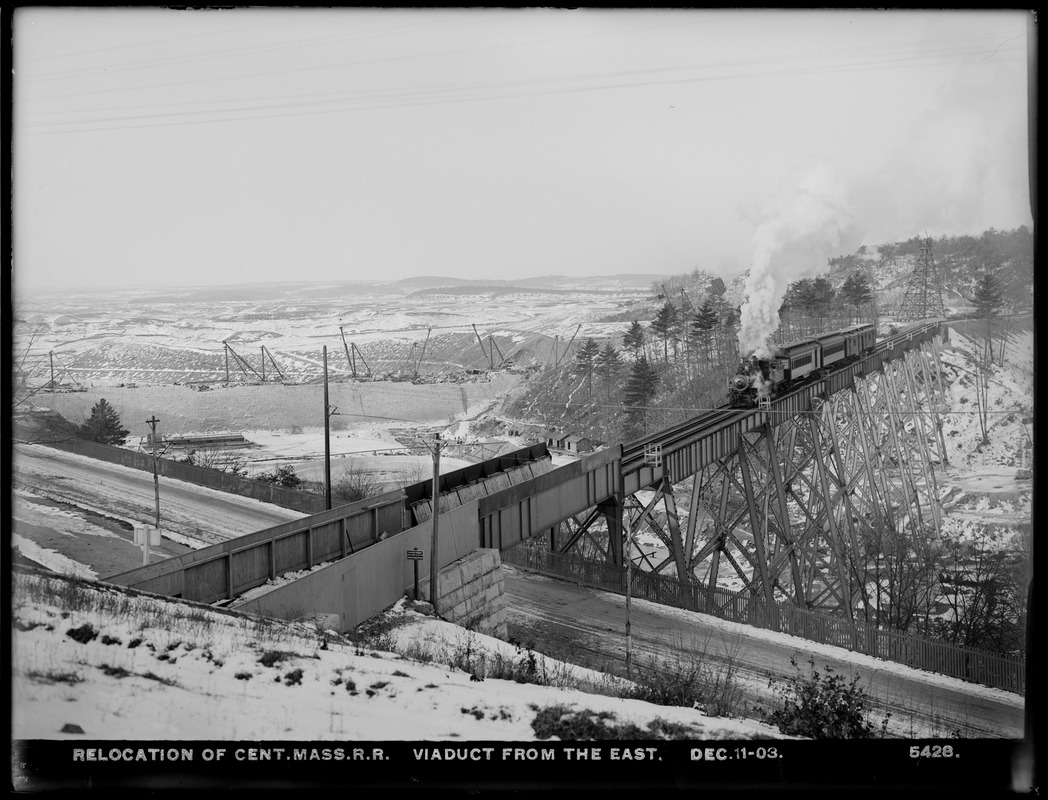
An eastbound passenger train passes over Clinton Viaduct on December 11, 1903, during work on the Wachusett Dam.

On June 5, 1895, the General Court of Massachusetts authorized the damming of the south branch of the Nashua River for the construction of the Wachusett Reservoir, flooding roughly 4,000 acres (1,600 ha) of land in the towns of Clinton, Boylston, and West Boylston. The Central Massachusetts Branch needed to be rerouted as the new reservoir would cover 7.01 miles (11.28 km) of track as well as the stations at South Clinton, Boylston, and West Boylston. Two proposals for the new route emerged. The first proposal called for a connection to the defunct Lancaster Railroad in Hudson that would route traffic through Bolton to a connection with the WN&P Division main line in South Lancaster and leave Berlin at the end of a four-mile branch. The second proposal would build a new route through Clinton and connect with the WN&P Division main line there. On April 3, 1902, the Metropolitan Water and Sewerage Board reached an agreement with the B&M to reroute the Central Massachusetts Branch according to the latter plan.

The new portion of the Central Massachusetts Branch started just west of West Berlin Junction in Berlin where the Central Massachusetts Branch connected with the Fitchburg Line of the NYNH&H. From there it ran northwest into Clinton through a 1,110-foot (340 m)-long tunnel. The western portal of the tunnel opened onto a 917-foot viaduct near the site of the Wachusett Dam that passed over Route 70 and the Nashua River before connecting with the WN&P Division main line at Clinton Junction. Traffic over the Central Massachusetts Branch followed the WN&P Division main line through Sterling into Oakdale where a redesigned junction routed it back onto the original Central Massachusetts Branch. Just before Clinton Junction an additional connection branched off at Reservoir Switch leading to East Switch on the WN&P Division to allow traffic to approach the Central Massachusetts Branch from the north or continue from the Central Massachusetts Branch north along the WN&P Division main line. The first train passed over the new route on June 2, 1903, while the old track was officially removed from through service on June 15 but remained in place and used during the remainder of the reservoir construction, some of it being re-gauged to 3' to allow construction trains to utilize it. Under this arrangement the WN&P main line between Oakdale and Sterling Junction became exceptionally busy as it accommodated B&M traffic from the WN&P Division and the Central Massachusetts Branch as well as NYNH&H traffic heading between Worcester and Fitchburg along the tracks of the original Fitchburg and Worcester Railroad.

=== Operation under Charles Mellen (1907–1913) ===
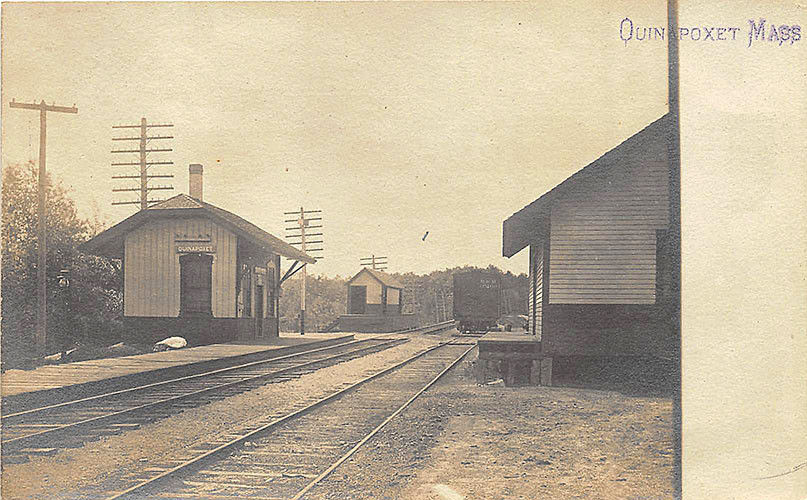
A postcard showing Quinapoxet Station circa 1907.

In 1907 Charles Sanger Mellen, the president of the NYNH&H and protégé of J. P. Morgan, gained control of the B&M to form a near monopoly on all rail traffic in southern New England. Mellen sought to build a direct route through Springfield that would funnel traffic into Boston along the Central Massachusetts Branch and away from the Boston and Albany Railroad (B&A), which was controlled by William H. Vanderbilt’s New York Central Railroad (NYC). Legal proceedings brought against Mellen by Louis D. Brandeis to break up his monopoly meant Mellen could not build the route himself so he befriended a railroad contractor from Westfield named Ralph D. Gillett and made him president of the Hampden Railroad with the intent to lease the new route upon its completion.

The Massachusetts General Court incorporated the Hampden in July 1910. It started at Hampden Junction on the Central Massachusetts Branch about two miles east of Bondsville and continued 14.82 miles southwest through Belchertown, Ludlow, and Chicopee to the B&A main line at Athol Junction about two miles east of Springfield. Construction finished by May 9, 1913, with service between New York and Boston scheduled to commence on June 23. Just days before its grand opening operations were suspended indefinitely as Mellen faced a hearing before the Interstate Commerce Commission (ICC) regarding his questionable business practices. He abruptly resigned from the presidencies of both the NYNH&H and B&M on July 9 leaving the Hampden a bridge between two suddenly competing railroads. Despite one more tour by B&M officials in November 1914 neither they nor the NYNH&H wished to lease the line, which was shut down for good in 1925.

=== Severance (1913–1939) ===
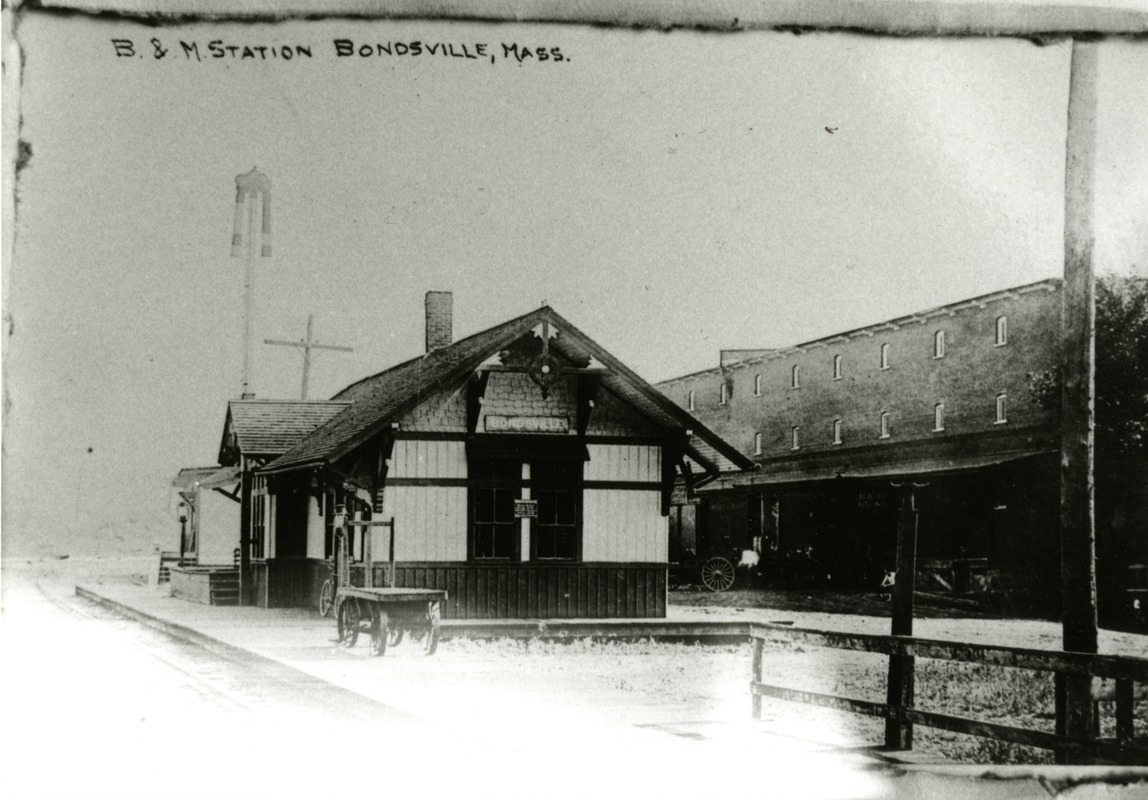
Bondsville Station around 1923.

The failure of the Hampden and Mellen's empire marked the beginning of the downturn of the Central Massachusetts Branch. Much of the traffic routed through Northampton under Mellen's empire vanished or was rerouted by the B&M along the parallel Fitchburg Division via Mechanicville. In August 1917 the B&M discontinued passenger service between Ware and Northampton and downsized the terminal in Ware significantly. The line enjoyed a brief upswing in traffic between World War I and the early 1920s but the Great Depression and increased competition from automobiles and trucks began to take their toll in the latter half of the decade. By 1928 no freights and only one passenger train ran the length of the line from Boston to Northampton.

The struggling economy and reduction in business forced the B&M to take austerity measures and cut back on less profitable lines including the Central Massachusetts Branch. To keep the line open but defray some of the operation and maintenance costs the B&M obtained trackage rights to the Central Vermont Railway's Southern Division in 1931, which ran parallel to the Central Massachusetts Branch for several miles between Belchertown and Amherst. Connections at Canal Junction in Belchertown and at Norwottuck Junction in Amherst allowed the B&M to route all of its trains over the Southern Division and abandon the parallel Central Massachusetts Branch tracks. The railroad pulled off a similar maneuver in January 1933, obtaining trackage rights to the Ware River Branch of the B&A. In order to maintain service to customers in Gilbertville and Wheelwright the B&M build three connections to the Ware River Branch at Barre Junction in Barre, Forest Lake Junction in Palmer, and Creamery in Hardwick. The railroad routed trains on the Central Massachusetts Branch along the Ware River Branch and made the sections from Creamery to Gilbertville and Wheelwright spurs, taking the tracks south of Gilbertville to Forest Lake and north of Wheelwright to Barre Junction out of service. The ICC approved the abandonments in 1941 and the B&M took up all of the abandoned tracks.

To further cut costs the B&M also reduced service on the Central Massachusetts Branch, discontinuing passenger service to Northampton on April 23, 1932. In 1943 the B&M abandoned the Marlborough Branch between its original connection with the Fitchburg Division in South Acton through Maynard and Stow to Gleason Junction, making the Central Massachusetts Branch the exclusive route into Marlborough. By 1938 most of the traffic on the Central Massachusetts Branch was east of Clinton. The only business on the western end of the line was local freight service between Northampton and Rutland. Since no trains passed over the middle of the route the B&M took the tracks between Oakdale and Muschopauge out of service on June 1, 1938. Later that year on September 21 the Hurricane of 1938 badly damaged the tracks, particularly near the Quinapoxet, Ware, and Swift Rivers where washouts severed the line at Coldbrook and knocked out a bridge in Gilbertville. The B&M could not justify the cost to make repairs to an area it was hardly using and so on January 30, 1939, the railroad formally submitted a request to the ICC to abandon the Central Massachusetts Branch tracks between Oakdale and Barre Junction, abandon the B&A Ware River tracks between Creamery and Gilbertville, and discontinue operations on the B&A Ware River Branch between Creamery and Barre Junction. The ICC approved the abandonments on November 7 and then the discontinuance of service on the Ware River Branch a month later on December 17. With the line officially cloven in two the B&M renamed the line between Northampton and Wheelwright as the Wheelwright Branch and retained the Central Massachusetts Branch moniker for the eastern half of the line between Boston and Oakdale.

=== Abandonment of the Wheelwright Branch ===
On the Wheelwright Branch freight service continued between Northampton and Wheelwright at least three times per week until 1973 when the paper mill in Wheelwright closed. In April 1974 the B&M cut freight service to once per week, took the tracks between Creamery and Wheelwright out of service, and embargoed all traffic on the line east of Bondsville. With only one customer in Bondsville the railroad petitioned the ICC to abandon the remainder of the Wheelwright Branch in June 1979, reasoning that that business could be better served by the new Massachusetts Central Railroad which the General Court had chartered on October 16, 1975, to run along the Ware River Secondary of the bankrupt Penn Central Railroad after that line was to be excluded from the government's reorganization of the northeast railroads into Conrail. The ICC approved the plan and operations east of Amherst ceased by August and on the rest of the line by November.

On February 14, 1980, the B&M officially took line from Northampton to Norwottuck out of service. Later that month the Massachusetts Central assumed responsibility for the customer in Bondsville but had to stop after about a year due to the poor condition of the tracks. The ICC finally approved the abandonment of the Wheelwright Branch in 1982 and the B&M took up the tracks between Northampton and Norwottuck later that year. This left only two sections of B&M-owned track on the Wheelwright Branch: between Canal Junction and Bondsville and between Creamery and Wheelwright. The Massachusetts Central could not afford to acquire either property and so in 1983 the B&M took up both. As of 2006 the last remaining portion of the Central Massachusetts Railroad still in revenue service is in Ware where the Massachusetts Central uses what remains of the yard in that town as well as a small section that provides access to a paper plant customer.

=== Decline in the east (1939–2006) ===
In 1939 the B&M ended passenger service to Marlborough leaving the four daily trains between Boston and Clinton the last of the passenger service on the Central Massachusetts Branch. Freight service, however, continued to all three communities and saw a major uptick as World War II intensified. In 1942 the United States Government built the Fort Devens-Sudbury Training Annex which connected to the Central Massachusetts Branch at Mirror Lake Junction just east of Ordway station in Hudson. B&M trains transported huge quantities of ammunition to and from the bunker with inbound ammunition from Boston being dropped in a yard just north of Mirror Lake Junction and outbound ammunition being brought to the NYNH&H in South Sudbury. This business ended with the war as the government repurposed the facility and removed the yard and connection to the Central Massachusetts Branch.

Further east the B&M worked with the state and other railroads to modernize and streamline the rail infrastructure in and around Boston between 1951 and 1952. Rather than have the Central Massachusetts Branch and Fitchburg Division run parallel to one another from Clematis Brook to their connection at Fens in Cambridge, the B&M decided to connect the two lines at Clematis Brook and route all Central Massachusetts Branch traffic onto the Fitchburg Division. After upgrading the Fitchburg Division to handle the increase in traffic the railroad took up the tracks of the Central Massachusetts Branch tracks between Clematis Brook and Hill Crossing. The remaining track between Hill Crossing and North Cambridge Junction became a part of the Freight Cutoff to the yards in Boston. Around the same time the B&M also modernized its motive power, adopting diesel locomotives throughout its system. The last of the steam locomotive operations for scheduled passenger revenue service on the B&M took place between Boston and Clinton on the Central Massachusetts Branch. On May 5, 1956, the last steam-powered train on the line departed Clinton for Boston and shortly thereafter the railroad closed the engine house in Clinton and began using Budd self-propelled railcars for passenger service along the route.

By 1958, freight and passenger business between Clinton and Boston dwindled to nearly nothing. The B&M cut all service west of Berlin early that year with only two weekday passenger trains running as far as Hudson on the Marlborough Branch. On August 11 the railroad removed all track between Berlin and Clinton Junction, including East Switch, from service. The viaduct in Clinton remained in place until 1974 when the Metropolitan District Commission removed it. On June 14, 1959, the B&M further cut passenger service to Hudson back to one daily round trip, after attempting to abandon all service on the line.

=== MBTA purchase and discontinuance ===
Central Mass Branch

Overview
- Status: Inactive
- Owner: Boston and Maine Railroad
- Locale: East-Central Massachusetts
- Termini: Hudson, Massachusetts; North Station, Boston, Massachusetts
- Stations: 14

Service
- Type: Commuter Rail
- System: MBTA Commuter Rail
- Rolling stock: Budd RDCs

History
- Opened: 1964
- Closed: November 26, 1971

Technical
- Line length: 28 miles
- Character: Surface
- Track gauge: Standard (1,435 mm (4 ft 8 1/2 in))

In 1959, the NYNH&H discontinued passenger service on its lines in the former Old Colony Railroad network, triggering calls for state intervention. In response, the Mass Transportation Commission tested fare and service levels throughout the NYNH&H and B&M systems, concluding that commuter rail service was important enough to warrant continued operation, but was unlikely to be financially self-sustaining. Based on this conclusion, the state created the Massachusetts Bay Transportation Authority (MBTA) on August 3, 1964, and merged it with the existing Metropolitan Transportation Authority to serve a larger part of the state and subsidize commuter rail service. The MBTA immediately set to work optimizing the commuter rail networks of the NYNH&H, NYC, and B&M. On the Central Massachusetts Branch, this included cutting passenger service back to South Sudbury starting on January 18, 1965.

In spite of the subsidies, ridership continued to decline on the Central Massachusetts Branch, and by 1969 the MBTA recommended an end to all service on the line. Devoted riders managed to briefly delay the decision, but in December 1970 the B&M filed for bankruptcy. On July 30, 1971, the state renewed the B&M's annual subsidy but without funding for the Central Massachusetts Branch. A group of citizens from Wayland argued that the single train along the route was too inconvenient for commuters and so on October 1 the MBTA announced that it would temporarily schedule more trains to determine whether the line was still viable. After two months, the MBTA concluded that the modest increase in ridership was not sufficient to warrant continued funding; on November 26, all passenger service ended on the Central Massachusetts Branch. The MBTA examined the possibility of restoring passenger service to the line in 1972 and again in 1975, but neither study led to the resumption of passenger service.

Despite the end of passenger service on the Central Massachusetts Branch freight service continued well into the 1970s. Trains ran to South Sudbury 3–4 times each week and traveled as far as Hudson when needed, usually 1–2 times per week. With no business in Marlborough the B&M took this segment of the Marlborough Branch out of service in 1974. On December 27, 1976, the B&M sold the Central Massachusetts Branch as well as its Budd RDC fleet and several other lines to the MBTA but retained the rights to freight service. Business continued to decline however, and by 1977 the B&M had to reduce service to runs as needed. That same year the railroad removed the track between Berlin and Hudson from service as it had deteriorated to the point of being unsafe. In August 1979 the B&M petitioned the ICC to abandon the Central Massachusetts Branch between Berlin and Waltham North Station and the remaining segment of the Marlborough Branch. The last train to Hudson ran on June 19, 1980, and the last train west of Waltham on August 14. The B&M officially took the track west of Bacon Street in Waltham out of service on September 11 and the United States District Court overseeing the B&M's bankruptcy instead approved a permanent discontinuance in October. More recently, two Massachusetts courts and a state agency refer to the ROW's status as "inactive". Around the same time the B&M and MBTA increased vertical height clearances along the New Hampshire Route main line. This made the Hill Crossing Freight Cutoff obsolete and in 1980 the B&M and MBTA took up the Central Massachusetts Branch track between Hill Crossing and North Cambridge Junction to make room for the MBTA's Red Line.

In 1983 Guilford Rail System purchased the B&M and began to transfer all operations to the B&M subsidiary Springfield Terminal Railway. The Springfield Terminal took over operations on the last piece of the Central Massachusetts Branch between Clematis Brook and Bacon Street in Waltham in 1987 and continued them until the last customer shut down in 1994. In 1996 State Representative Nancy Evans of Wayland proposed restoring commuter service on the Central Massachusetts Branch between Interstate 495 in Berlin and Boston to alleviate traffic on Route 20 but was met with substantial backlash from residents of new homes built along the dormant line in the time since its operations had ceased. The Executive Office of Transportation carried out a feasibility study anyway estimating that restoring service to the route as far as Berlin would cost in excess of $103 million and that any benefit gained was unlikely to outweigh the costs. In 1999 Evans, now the Director of Planning for the MBTA, proposed converting the Central Massachusetts right of way into a busway. In 2011, a joint trail/busway study was produced by the Metropolitan Area Planning Council, a public agency. The state rejected the busway portion of the proposal.

==== Rail to trail conversion ====
As of 2024, most of the tracks between Clematis Brook and Berlin have been removed, and most of the bridges have been restored or are funded for restoration as part of the Mass Central Rail Trail—Wayside. In 2026, the American Public Works Association honored the rail trail's Sudbury to Hudson segment with a Project of the Year award, in the Small Cities/Rural Communities: Historical Restoration/Preservation category.

== Mass Central Rail Trail ==
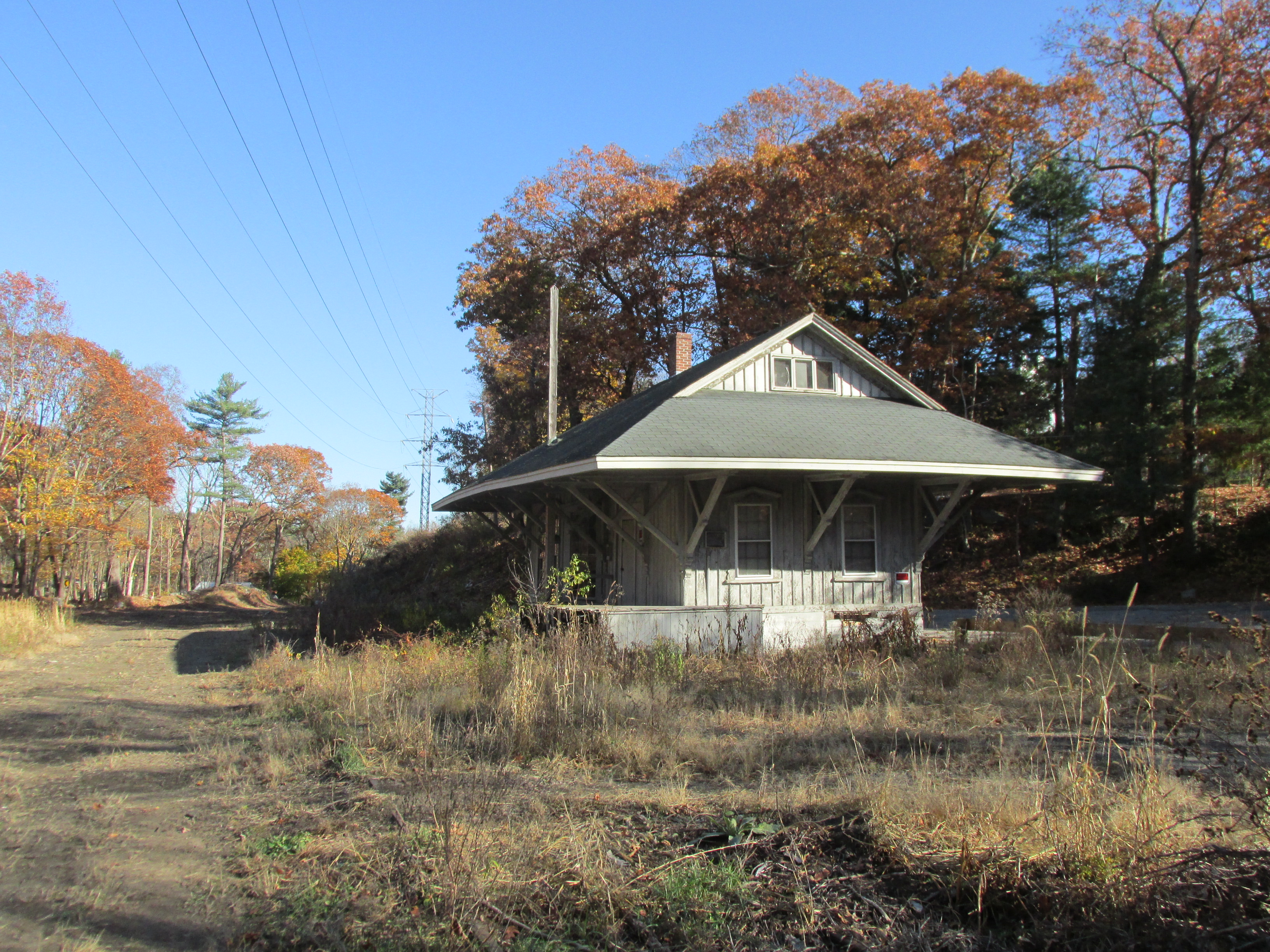
Weston Station is one of the few former Massachusetts Central Railroad Stations still standing.

In 1996 the towns along the eastern portion of the Central Massachusetts Branch requested permission to convert the route between Clematis Brook and Berlin into what was then proposed as the Wayside Rail Trail. The MBTA agreed to lease the property for the project with the stipulation that it would retain the right to revert it to a commuter rail line and that the trail would be policed and maintained by the communities themselves.

Every town along the route except for Weston accepted the terms, but without unanimous approval the trail took a while to come to fruition. Waltham moved ahead to convert the property in that city, reasoning that even if service were restored it would start from a new connection at Stony Brook west of their city limits.

In 2010, the Massachusetts DCR executed a 99-year lease with the MBTA to build what was renamed the Mass Central Rail Trail—Wayside, 23 miles from Berlin to Waltham. However, construction took significantly longer and is still planned or ongoing in various sections, as DCR funding was limited and various funding sources were identified.

Waltham eventually completed the main Waltham section in 2023, except for the Linden Street Bridge that DCR completed restoration of in 2025. DCR moved forward in Weston and Wayland; in 2019 it opened a 4.5 mile paved section of the trail from Stony Brook Bridge over the MBTA Fitchburg line at the Waltham-Weston border as far west as Wayland Station near the intersection of Route 126 and US 20. A crushed stone continuation connects the fully paved portion with the shopping center at the intersection of US 20 and Andrew Ave in Wayland. In 2024, in Sudbury and Hudson, a 7.6 mile paved section was completed, in partnership between DCR and Eversource's buried power line project.

Efforts to convert the property to recreational trails also found success elsewhere along the route. The portion of the Marlborough Branch between Gleason Junction and Marlborough became the Assabet River Rail Trail. In Boston the former Central Massachusetts Branch section of the Hill Crossing Freight Cutoff between Hill Crossing and North Cambridge Junction became the Fitchburg Cutoff Path.

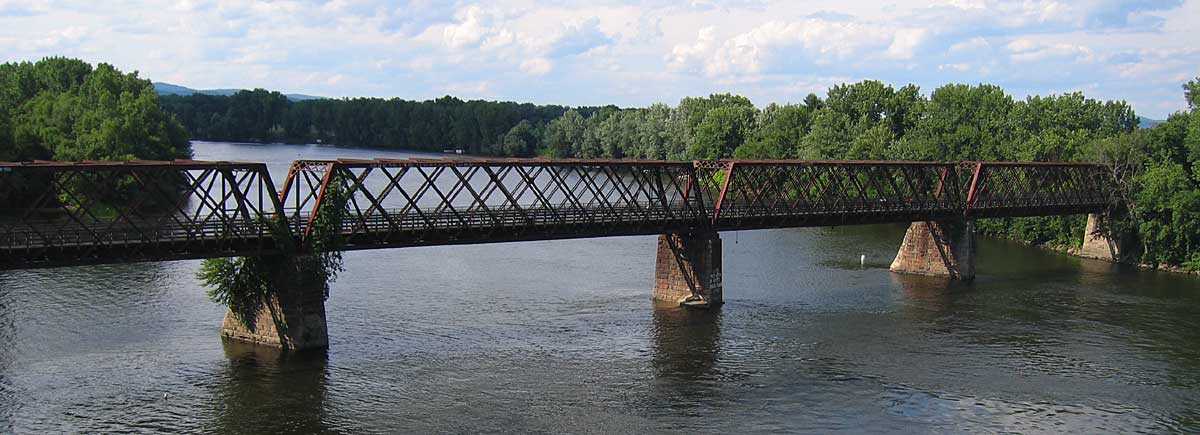
A photo of the Central Massachusetts Railroad bridge over the Connecticut River, which is now a part of the Norwottuck Branch Rail Trail.

The towns along the former Wheelwright Branch exhibited similar enthusiasm for recreational trails along the property. In March 1985 with support from the local governments and regional planning agency the state purchased 10 miles of the line between the west end of the Connecticut River Bridge in Northampton and Amherst with the intent to convert it into a rail trail. Work began in 1992 and on July 29, 1993, the Massachusetts Department of Environmental Management officially opened the Norwottuck Branch Rail Trail, now the Norwottuck Branch of the Mass Central Rail Trail. By 1997 the trail extended as far as Belchertown where progress halted due to a concerted effort from private landowners who had taken over the long-abandoned property. In 2006 the western end of the trail was extended to N. O. Tower. In West Boylston, Holden, and Rutland a volunteer organization called Wachusett Greenways began to convert the roughly 30 miles of property between Oakdale and Rutland to the Mass Central Rail Trail.

The Sterling Spur of the Mass Central Rail Trail is a portion of the former Fitchburg and Worcester Railroad in Sterling between Sterling Junction and Sterling Center; however this route was never a part of the Central Massachusetts Branch. It does not connect with the rest of the trail since the former WN&P Division main line tracks remain in service as the Worcester Main Line of Pan Am Railways.

== Locomotives ==
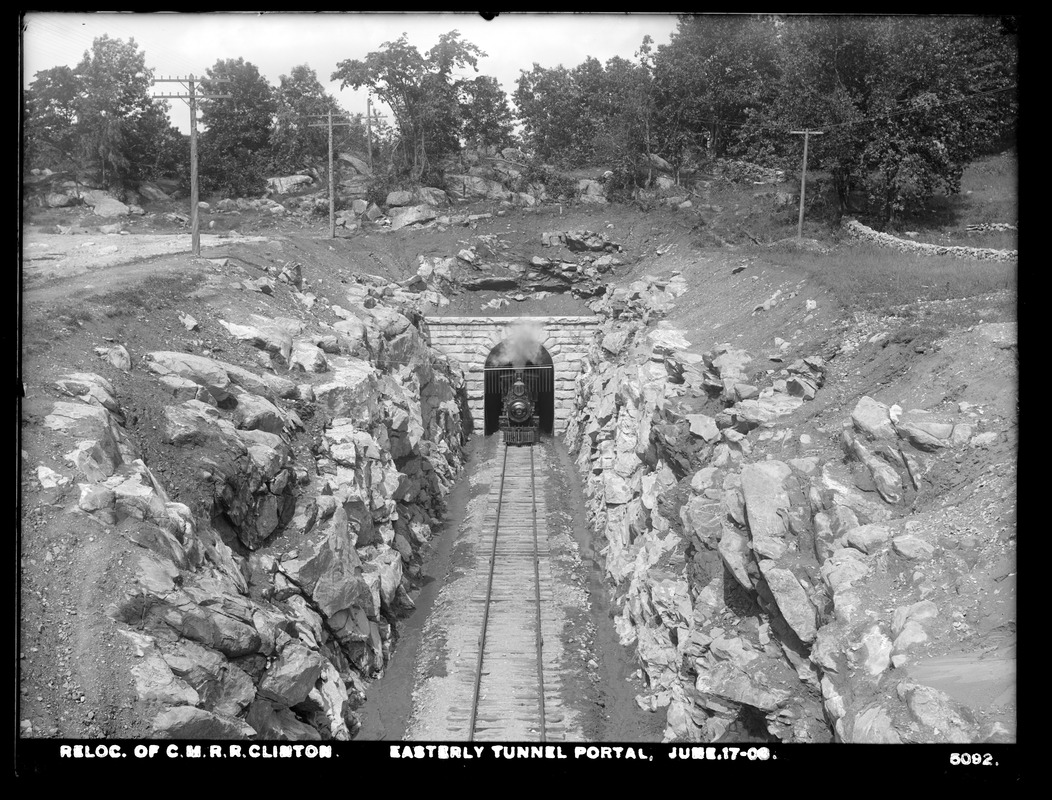
Engine 404 emerges from the eastern tunnel portal in Clinton on June 17, 1903, two days after it opened.

The Massachusetts Central Railroad operated five locomotives between 1881 and 1883. These were the only five locomotives that the company ever owned with other railroads providing motive power later in the line's history.

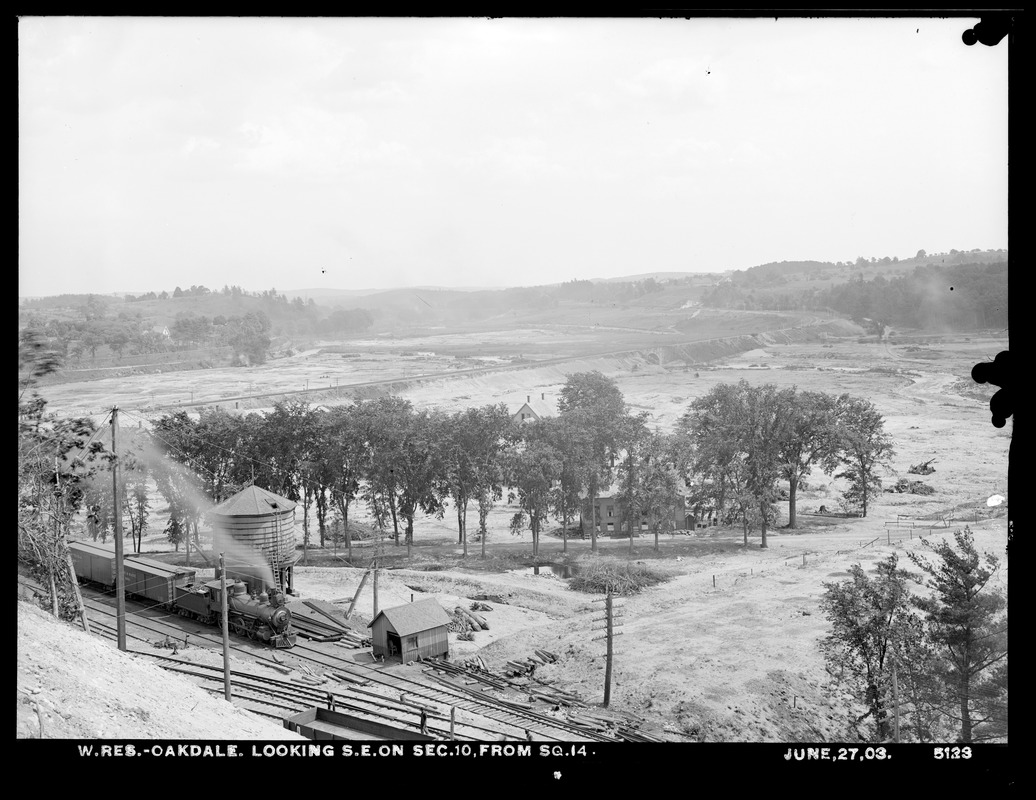
Engine 513 pulls a westbound freight over the Central Massachusetts Branch in Oakdale on June 27, 1903.

- No. 1
  - Model: 4-4-0
  - Manufacturer: Rogers Locomotive and Machine Works
  - Manufacturer Number: 2308
  - Cylinders: 15 x 24
  - Date Manufactured: 1873

Rogers Locomotive and Machine Works built locomotive No. 1 for the Indiana, Bloomington and Western Railway (IB&W) as their No. 70. In 1880 the IB&W returned the locomotive to Rogers which sold it to the Housatonic Railroad as their No. 21. The Massachusetts Central Railroad purchased the locomotive in 1881 then sold it to the St. Johnsbury and Lake Champlain Railroad (SJ&LC) in 1883 where it became No. 11, Col. Jewett. The locomotive became a part of the B&L following its merger with the SJ&LC in 1885. The B&L renumbered it as No. 163, Highgate. The locomotive returned to the SJ&LC 1887 when the B&M leased the B&L and became No. 8, Highgate. The SJ&LC scrapped the locomotive in May 1892.

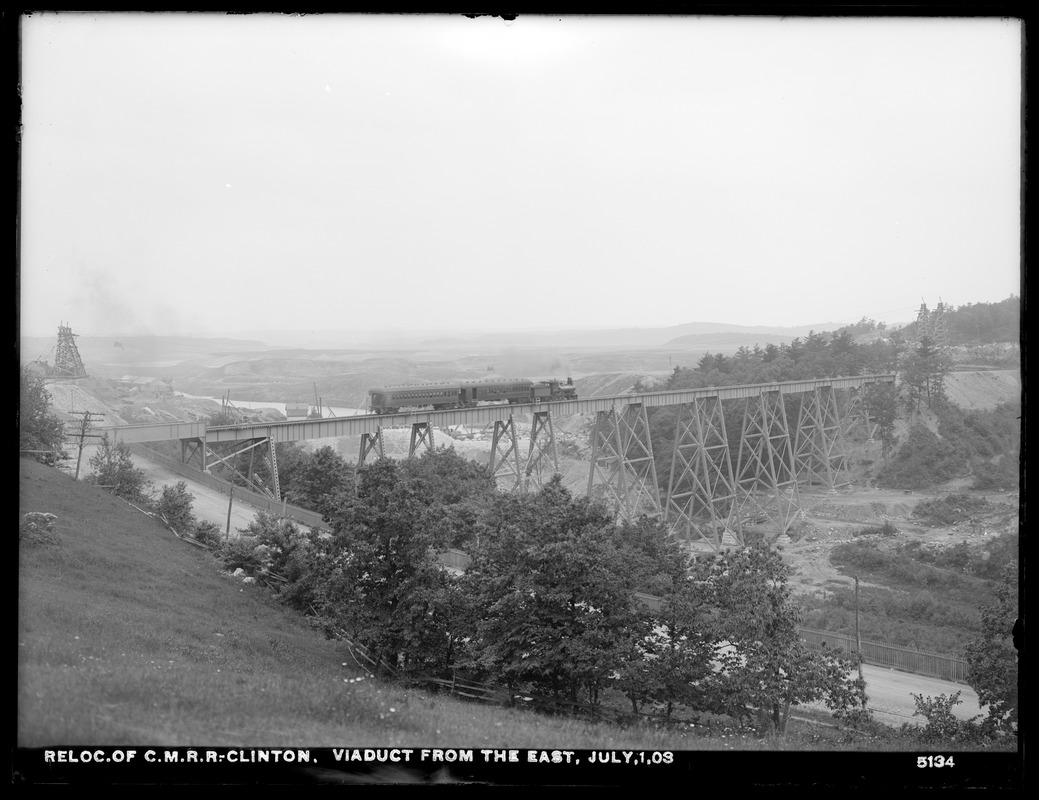
A 4-4-0 locomotive passes over the Clinton Viaduct on July 1, 1903.

- No. 2
  - Model: 4–4–0
  - Manufacturer: Rogers Locomotive and Machine Works
  - Manufacturer Number: 2310
  - Cylinders: 15 x 24
  - Date Manufactured: July 26, 1873

Rogers built locomotive No. 2 for the IB&W as their No. 71. In 1880 the IB&W returned the locomotive to Rogers which sold it to the Housatonic as their No. 22. The Massachusetts Central Railroad purchased the locomotive in 1881 then sold it to the SJ&LC in 1883 where it became No. 12, Col. Fairbanks. The locomotive became a part of the B&L in 1887, which renumbered it as No. 164, Col. Fairbanks. The B&M took possession of the locomotive in 1895, renumbering it as No. 629 and then No. 555 on February 29, 1904. The B&M scrapped the locomotive on March 20, 1907.

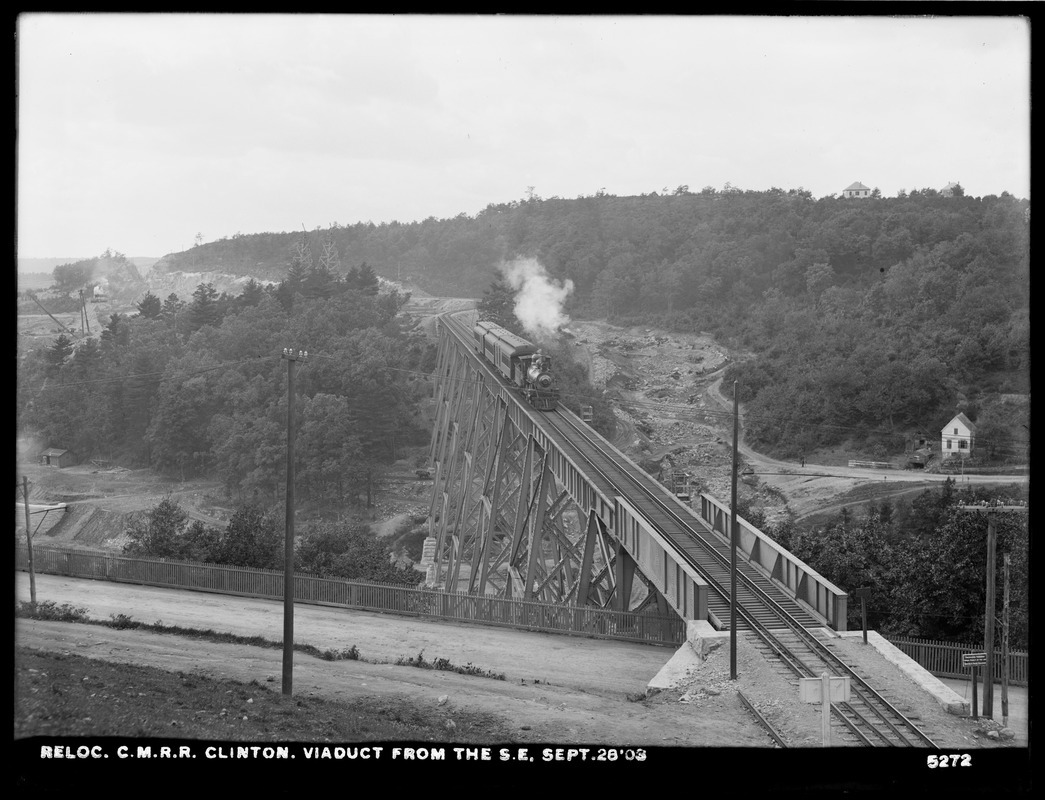
A 4-4-0 locomotive passes over the viaduct on September 28, 1903.

- No. 3
  - Model: 4–4–0
  - Manufacturer: Schenectady Locomotive Works
  - Manufacturer Number: 1443
  - Cylinders: 17 x 24
  - Date Manufactured: October 1881

Schenectady Locomotive Works built locomotive No. 3 for the Massachusetts Central Railroad. In 1887 the locomotive became B&L No. 10, Woburn, and later that year it became B&M No. 310, Woburn. The B&M rebuilt the locomotive in 1898 and renumbered it No. 680 in 1911 before scrapping it in August 1920.

Massachusetts Central No. 4 at the Pope Street crossing in Hudson, likely in fall of 1881.

- No. 4
  - Model: 4–4–0
  - Manufacturer: Schenectady Locomotive Works
  - Manufacturer Number: 1444
  - Cylinders: 17 x 24
  - Date Manufactured: October 1881

Schenectady built locomotive No. 4 for the Massachusetts Central Railroad. In 1887 the locomotive became B&L No. 65, Marlboro, and later that year it became B&M No. 365, Marlboro. Manchester Locomotive Works rebuilt the locomotive in 1904 and the B&M renumbered it No. 683 in 1911, scrapping it before 1923.

Massachusetts Central No. 5 'N.C. Munson', pictured here on Feb. 9, 1875 as N.C. Munson Construction's No. 11.

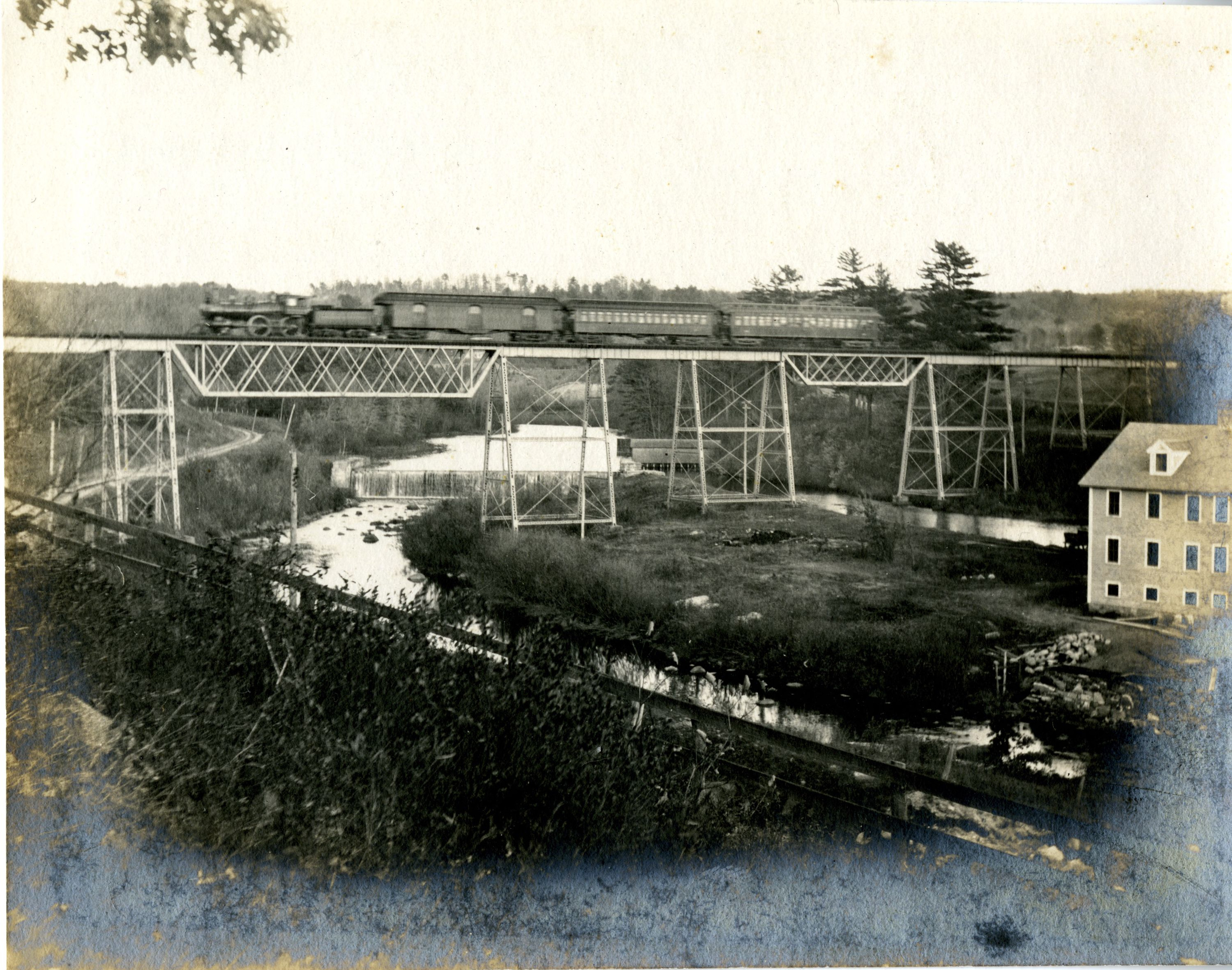
A 4-4-0 locomotive pulls passengers across the Bondsville Trestle in 1910.

- No. 5
  - Model: 4–4–0
  - Manufacturer: Hinkley & Williams
  - Manufacturer Number: 809
  - Cylinders: Unknown
  - Date Manufactured: October 1867

Prior to its time with the Massachusetts Central Railroad Locomotive No. 5 was No. 11, N. C. Munson, of the N. C. Munson Construction Company (incidentally the original contractor for the Massachusetts Central Railroad). It was sold to the Massachusetts Central around 1882 and sold at auction in 1886.

=== Other Power ===
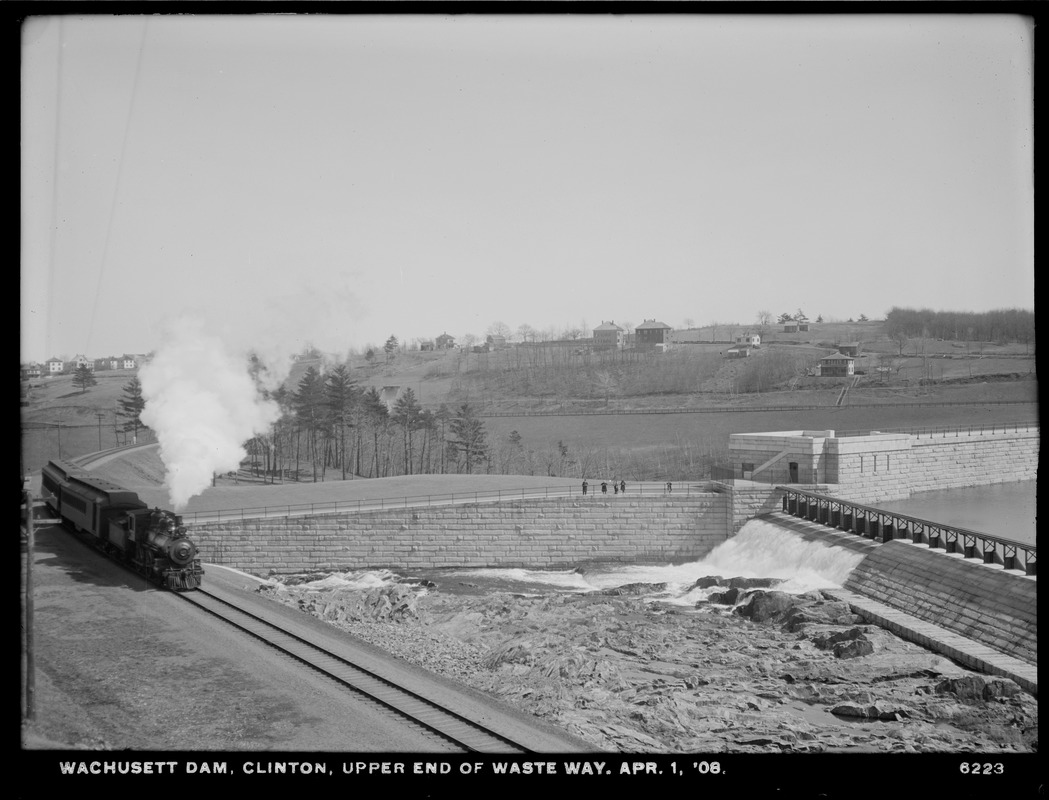
A 4-4-0 locomotive pulls a pair of coaches near the Wachusett Dam Waste Weir in Clinton on April 1, 1908.

In addition to the above locomotives the Massachusetts Central Railroad would on occasion lease power from the B&L. Small 4–4–0, 4-6-0, and 0-4-0 locomotives predominated through 1900 partially due to weight restrictions over the line's bridges. After 1900 the 4-4-0 locomotives continued to provide the bulk of the power for passenger service with class B-14 and B-15 2-6-0, class L-1 4-8-0, and class A-41-f 4-4-0 locomotives mixed in for longer and freight trips. During WWII K-8-b and K-8-c class 2-8-0 locomotives worked the larger ammunition trains on the eastern end of the line. J-1 class 4-4-2 locomotives generally handled passenger service during the war and into the 1950s. Diesel power arrived in the mid-1950s with EMD SW9 switchers regularly assigned to the Marlborough local freight starting in June 1953. Road switchers equipped with steam generators took over passenger service on the Central Massachusetts Branch starting in 1956. Budd Rail Diesel Cars quickly replaced the road switchers for passenger service beginning in the late 1950s and continued service in that capacity until passenger service ceased in 1971.

== Stations and junctions ==
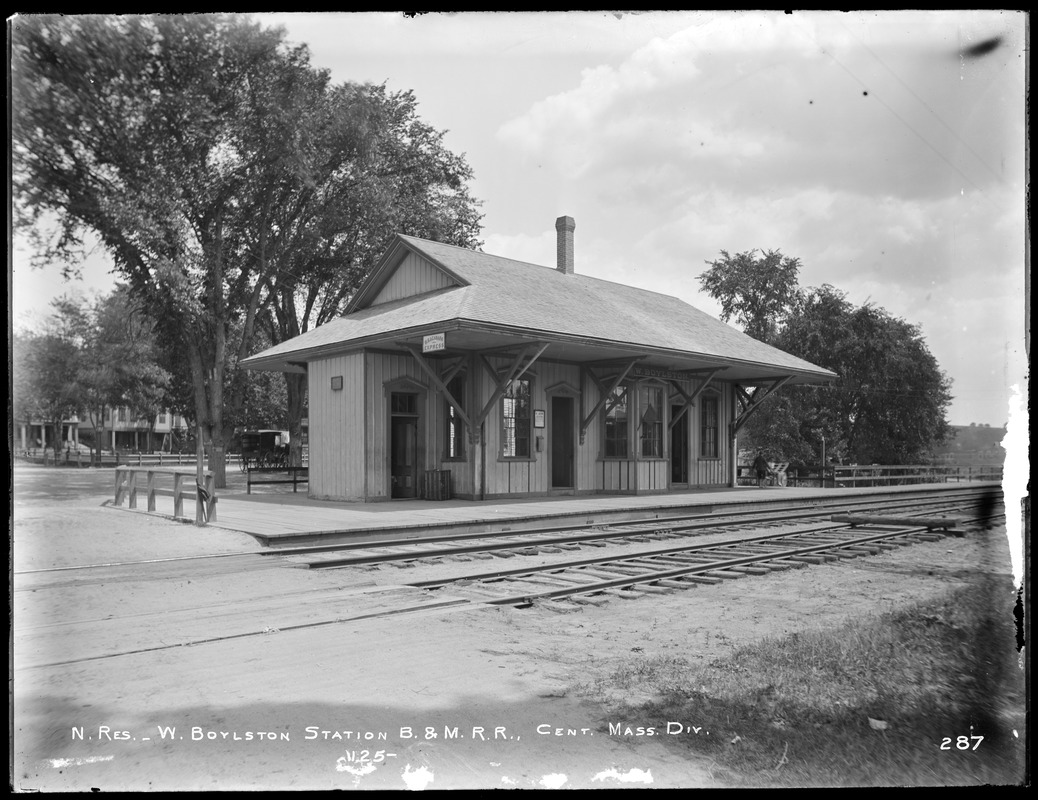
West Boylston Station on July 11, 1896.

The Central Massachusetts Railroad built its stations in the Gothic-inspired Victorian style of architecture popular during the 1870s. The name of the architect responsible for their design has been lost to time. Cost restrictions played heavily into the station designs though the railroad added decorations such as painted wainscotting and gables for aesthetics. All of the stations were wooden and based on one of two basic plans for smaller or larger communities. Individual stations were often tailored to their location, including additions such as attached or separate freight houses and milk sheds which were similarly decorated to appear presentable to the public. Other structures such as engine houses, water towers, section houses, and crossing shanties were not decorated. To create the illusion of variety the railroad never used the same design on two consecutive stations except at Waverly and Belmont where the consistent design helped passengers distinguish the Central Massachusetts Railroad stations from those of the parallel Fitchburg Railroad.

The station listing on the Central Massachusetts Railroad changed many times over the line's history thanks to leases, ownership changes, and rerouting. The list below is from the 1920 Boston and Maine Southern Division employees' timetable. The listings with grayed-out backgrounds are the stations between West Berlin Junction and Oakdale that the railroad abandoned during the construction of the Wachusett Reservoir. The italicized mileage numbers for these stations indicate their position on the line in the 1892 employees' timetable.

City	Milepost	Station/ Junction	Date Opened	Date Agency Closed	Date Closed	Train Order Office	Telegraph Symbol	Notes
Boston	0.00	North Union Station	1893		1927	Continuous	HO	Preceded by Boston and Lowell Railroad (B&L) terminal Replaced by North Station
Cambridge	4.39	North Cambridge	October 1, 1881	April 23, 1927	April 24, 1927	Continuous	AU	Splits off of the Lexington Branch at North Cambridge Junction; Lexington Branch before 1932; North Cambridge Junction before 1910; North Avenue before the 1880s
Belmont	5.80	Hill Crossing	Before December 19, 1887		Before August 1964	N/A	N/A	Begins running parallel with Fitchburg Division
Belmont	6.70	Belmont	October 1, 1881		1952	N/A	N/A	Parallel with Fitchburg Division
Belmont	7.68	Waverley	October 1, 1881	1918	1952	Day	WY	Parallel with Fitchburg Division
Waltham	8.58	Clematis Brook	Before December 19, 1887		Before August 1964	N/A	N/A	Connection with the Fitchburg Division; Stops running parallel with Fitchburg Division; Also known as Blue Hill Station around 1909
Waltham	10.05	Waltham North	October 1, 1881		November 26, 1971	N	WA	Waltham before April 1912
Waltham	10.64	Waltham Highlands	October 1, 1881		November 26, 1971	N/A	N/A	Hammond Street before 1899; West Waltham before 1883; Station intact as of 2017 as a privately owned office building
Weston	13.24	Weston	October 1, 1881		November 26, 1971	Day	WS	Station intact and privately owned
Weston	13.97	Cherry Brook	Before October 9, 1882	1913	November 26, 1971	N/A	N/A	Passenger shelter demolished in 1996
Wayland	15.53	Tower Hill	October 1, 1881	December 31, 1920	November 26, 1971	N/A	N/A	Original station burned down around 1890; Passenger shelter demolished in 1999
Wayland	16.77	Wayland	October 1, 1881	November 29, 1949	November 26, 1971	Day	ND	Station intact and owned by the Town of Wayland, housing a non-profit volunteer gift shop Freight house intact and owned by Town of Wayland
Sudbury	18.84	East Sudbury	Before December 19, 1887	1913	November 26, 1971	N/A	N/A	Ticket sales discontinued in 1888
Sudbury	19.99	South Sudbury	October 1, 1881		November 26, 1971	Continuous	BU	Connection with the Framingham-Lowell Branch (NYNH&H); Original section house restored in 2000; New station built in 1952 still intact and used by local business
Sudbury	21.93	Wayside Inn (later Wayside Inn Railroad Waiting Room)	October 1, 1881	None	Before 1944	N/A	N/A	Flag stop, originally simple platform Japanese style building by 1897; Burned by vandals sometime in the 1940s.
Hudson	23.34	Mirror Lake Junction	1942	None	1945	N/A	N/A	No station Connection to the Fort Devens-Sudbury Training Annex
Hudson	24.14	Ordway	1902		January 17, 1965	N/A	N/A	Ordway's Crossing before 1909; Passenger shelter demolished in 1972
Hudson	25.64	Gleasondale	October 1, 1881	December 1, 1924	January 17, 1965	N/A	N/A	Rockbottom before April 2, 1900.
Hudson	26.28	Gleason Junction	1902		January 17, 1965	Day	N/A	No station Connection with the Marlborough Branch; Provided access to stations in Hudson and Marlborough
Marlborough Branch
Hudson		Hudson	1850		January 17, 1965	N/A	N/A	Chartered as a part of the Lancaster and Sterling Railroad in 1846 then leased by the Fitchburg Railroad that same year The B&M assumed operations from the Central Massachusetts Branch in 1902
Marlborough		Marlborough	1855		1939	N/A	N/A	Chartered as a part of the Marlborough Branch Railroad in 1852 then leased by the Fitchburg Railroad in 1853; The B&M assumed operations from the Central Massachusetts Branch in 1902
Hudson	28.00	Hudson	October 1, 1881		December 30, 1950	Day	HD	Original depot replaced in the 1930s Passenger traffic moved to Hudson Station on the Marlborough Branch until January 17, 1965; Station intact but appears very different due to extensive remodeling
Bolton	29.78	South Bolton	Before October 9, 1882	January 10, 1921	Before 1944	N/A	N/A	Formerly Bolton
Berlin	31.71	Berlin	Before December 29, 1881		January 30, 1931	Day	BE	
Berlin	32.78	West Berlin Junction	Before October 9, 1882	None	August 11, 1958	N/A	N/A	No station Connection with the Fitchburg Line (NYNH&H)
Pre-1903 Wachusett Reservoir Alignment
Clinton	35.60	South Clinton	Before December 29, 1881		June 1903	N/A	N/A	Closed due to construction of Wachusett Reservoir
Boylston	36.85	Boylston	Before December 29, 1881		June 1903	N/A	N/A	Closed due to construction of Wachusett Reservoir
West Boylston	39.96	West Boylston	Before December 29, 1881		June 1903	Day	CN	Closed due to construction of Wachusett Reservoir
West Boylston	41.30	Oakdale	Before December 29, 1881		June 1903	Day	OD	Remained in place but all surrounding trackage was reconfigured due to construction of Wachusett Reservoir; Freight telegraph symbol "FA"
Clinton	35.62	Reservoir Switch	1903	None	August 11, 1958	Day	N/A	No station Formed wye leading to Worcester, Nashua, and Portland (WN&P) Division main line South branch connected at Clinton Junction; North branch connected at East Switch
Clinton	36.38	East Switch	1903	None	August 11, 1958	Day	N/A	No station Connection at north end of WN&P Division main line
Clinton	36.80	Clinton Junction	1903		August 11, 1958	Continuous	N/A	Connection at south end of WN&P Division main line
Sterling		Sterling Junction				Day	SJ	Station on WN&P Division main line
West Boylston	41.56	Oakdale	1903	June 30, 1932		Continuous	OD	Split off from the WN&P Division main line Freight telegraph symbol "FA"
Holden	43.00	Springdale	1882		Before 1892	N/A	N/A	
Holden	44.79	Canada Mills Siding	1882	None	Before June 1, 1938	N/A	N/A	No station Passing siding
Holden	46.09	Quinapoxet	Before December 29, 1881	October 1925	November 13, 1928	N/A	N/A	Holden before the 1880s
Holden	47.00	Holden Junction	Before December 29, 1881	None	1909	N/A	N/A	No station Connection with the Worcester & Hillsboro Branch
Holden	48.38	Jefferson	June 1882		Before June 1, 1938	Day	JF	Jefferson's before 1898
Rutland	51.66	Muschopauge	1898		June 25, 1925	N/A	N/A	
Rutland	53.05	Summit Siding	Before December 19, 1887	None	January 30, 1939	N/A	N/A	No station Formerly Rutland Summit; Passing siding Highest point on the Central Massachusetts Branch (1,061 feet)
Rutland	54.29	Rutland	Before December 19, 1887	September 6, 1934	January 30, 1939	Continuous	RU	
Rutland	56.29	West Rutland	Before December 19, 1887	August 11, 1927	January 30, 1939	Day	RD	
Oakham	59.96	Coldbrook	Before December 19, 1887		August 12, 1926	Day	CB	
Barre	61.68	Barre	Before December 19, 1887	July 27, 1928	January 30, 1939	Day	RE	Agency discontinued
Barre		Barre Junction	1933	None	January 30, 1939	N/A	N/A	No station Connection with the Ware River Branch (B&A)
Barre	63.46	Barre Plains	Before December 19, 1887	January 31, 1940	1933	Day	BS	
Hardwick	65.85	Wheelwright	Before December 19, 1887	April 11, 1935	April 1974	Day	RW	Hardwick prior to 1894; Passenger agency discontinued Freight agency discontinued 1973
New Braintree	66.77	New Braintree	Before December 19, 1887	1918	Before April 1974	Day	Z	
Hardwick		Creamery	1933	None	April 1974	N/A	N/A	No station Connection with the Ware River Branch (B&A)
Hardwick	70.57	Gilbertville	Before December 19, 1887	Assumed by B&A October 1, 1939	1938	Day	GR	Station intact and houses a pizza shop
Ware	74.91	Ware	June 27, 1887	Joint with B&A	1975	Continuous	AR	Ware Union Station jointly operated with the B&A
Ware		Forest Lake Junction	1932	None	1975	N/A	N/A	No station Connection with the Ware River Branch (B&A)
Palmer		Hampden Junction	1913	None	1913	N/A	N/A	No station Connection with the Hampden Railroad
Palmer	79.14	Gates Siding	1887	None	1975	N/A	N/A	No station
Palmer	82.58	Bondsville	Before December 19, 1887	Also served Wheelwright beginning in 1960s, closed September 28, 1973	August 1979	Day	BV	Station demolished in 1980 as part of a fire department training exercise
Belchertown	87.18	Canal Junction	1931	None	August 1979	N/A	N/A	No station Connection with the Southern Division (CV)
Belchertown	87.90	Belchertown	Before December 19, 1887	Joint with CV	1931	Day	BN	
Belchertown	92.47	Pansy Park	Before 1890	1913	1931	N/A	N/A	
Amherst	94.80	Norwottuck	Before December 19, 1887		May 26, 1924	Day	RS	South Amherst before 1910; Dwight between 1910 and 1912; Norwottuck Junction built in 1931, connected with Southern Division
Amherst	97.29	Amherst	Before December 19, 1887	April 24, 1938	November 1979	Day	MH	Station and freight sheds now used by Amherst Farmer's Supply
Hadley	99.41	East Hadley	1896		April 23, 1932	N/A	N/A	
Hadley	101.60	Hadley	Before December 19, 1887		March 25, 1955	Day	HY	Ticket sales discontinued October 18, 1928; Freight house remains intact Water tower remains, now municipal water supply
Northampton	103.64	N. O. Tower	Before December 19, 1887	None	November 1950	Continuous	NO	Connection with the Connecticut River Division main line
Northampton	104.67	Northampton	1897			Day	NA/ NR	Located on the Connecticut River Division main line Station intact and houses several restaurants Passenger service from the Central Massachusetts Branch discontinued April 23, 1932; All Central Massachusetts Branch operations discontinued November 1979

== See also ==
- CSX Transportation
- Norfolk Southern Railway
- Grand Trunk Railway
- Canadian National Railway
