= Waltham North station =

Waltham North
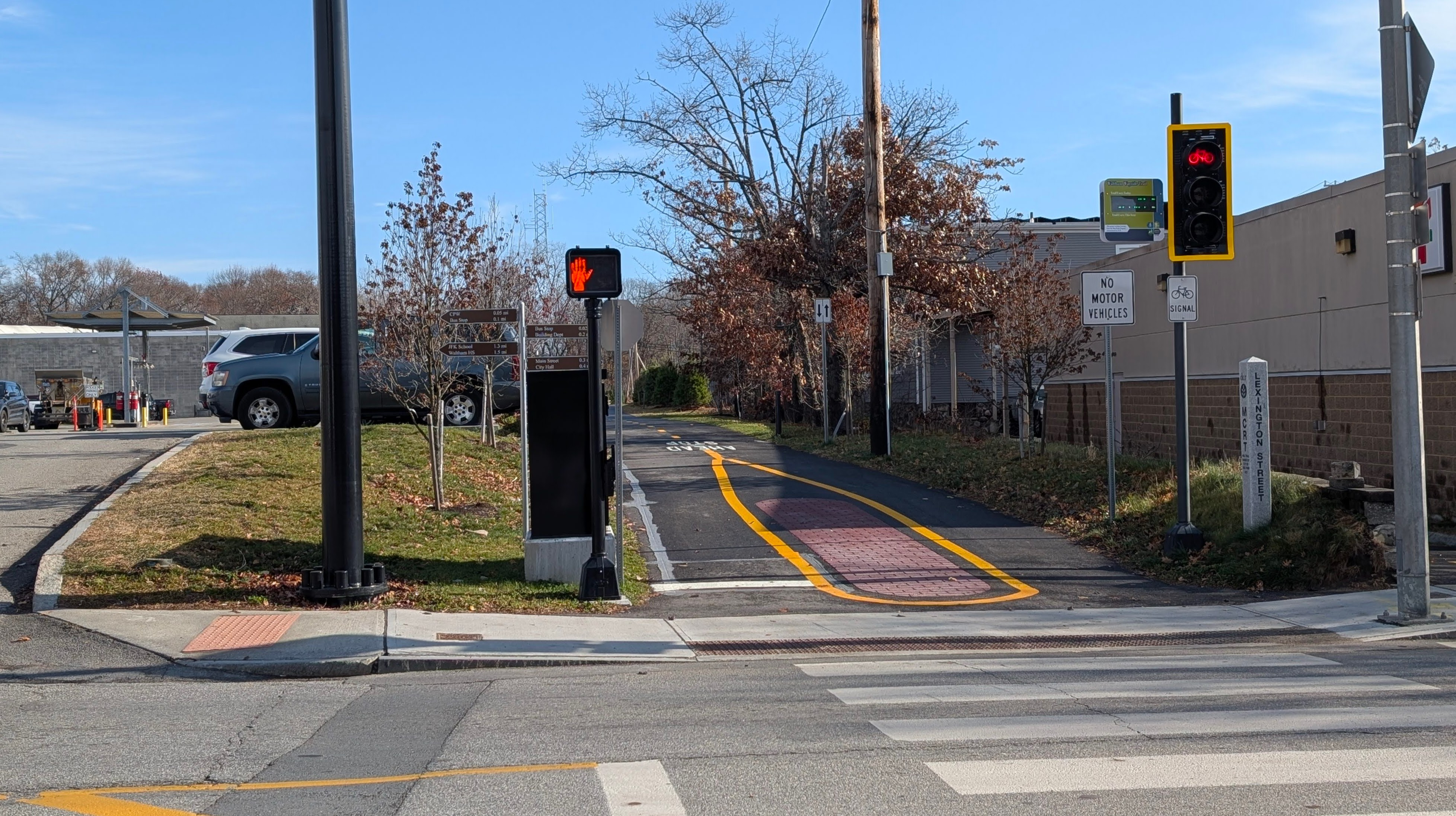
- Site of Waltham North station in November 2024

General information
- Location: Lexington Street; Waltham, Massachusetts
- Coordinates: 42.381254°N 71.236483°W
- Owner: MBTA
- Lines: Massachusetts Central Railroad; Central Massachusetts Branch (Boston & Maine); Central Mass Branch (MBTA)
- Platforms: 1
- Tracks: 2

History
- Opened: 1881
- Closed: November 26, 1971

Former services
Preceding station	MBTA	Following station
Waltham Highlands toward South Sudbury	Central Mass Branch (closed 1971)	Clematis Brook toward North Station
Preceding station	Boston and Maine Railroad	Following station
Waltham Highlands toward Northampton	Central Mass Branch	Clematis Brook toward Boston
Location

Waltham North station is a former railroad station in Waltham, Massachusetts. It was originally built by the Massachusetts Central Railroad which constructed it 1881, and by 1885 it was operated by the successor Central Massachusetts Railroad. It was part of the MBTA Commuter Rail system from 1965 to 1971. It was located on Lexington Street in north-central Waltham. It was closed on November 26, 1971, when service on the Central Mass Branch was terminated due to poor track conditions and low ridership. The station building is no longer extant, having been demolished at some point after the end of service on the branch. In 2023, a paved section of the Mass Central Rail Trail—Wayside was built along the railbed past the former station site.
