= Wayland station =

Former railroad station in Wayland, Massachusetts

Wayland
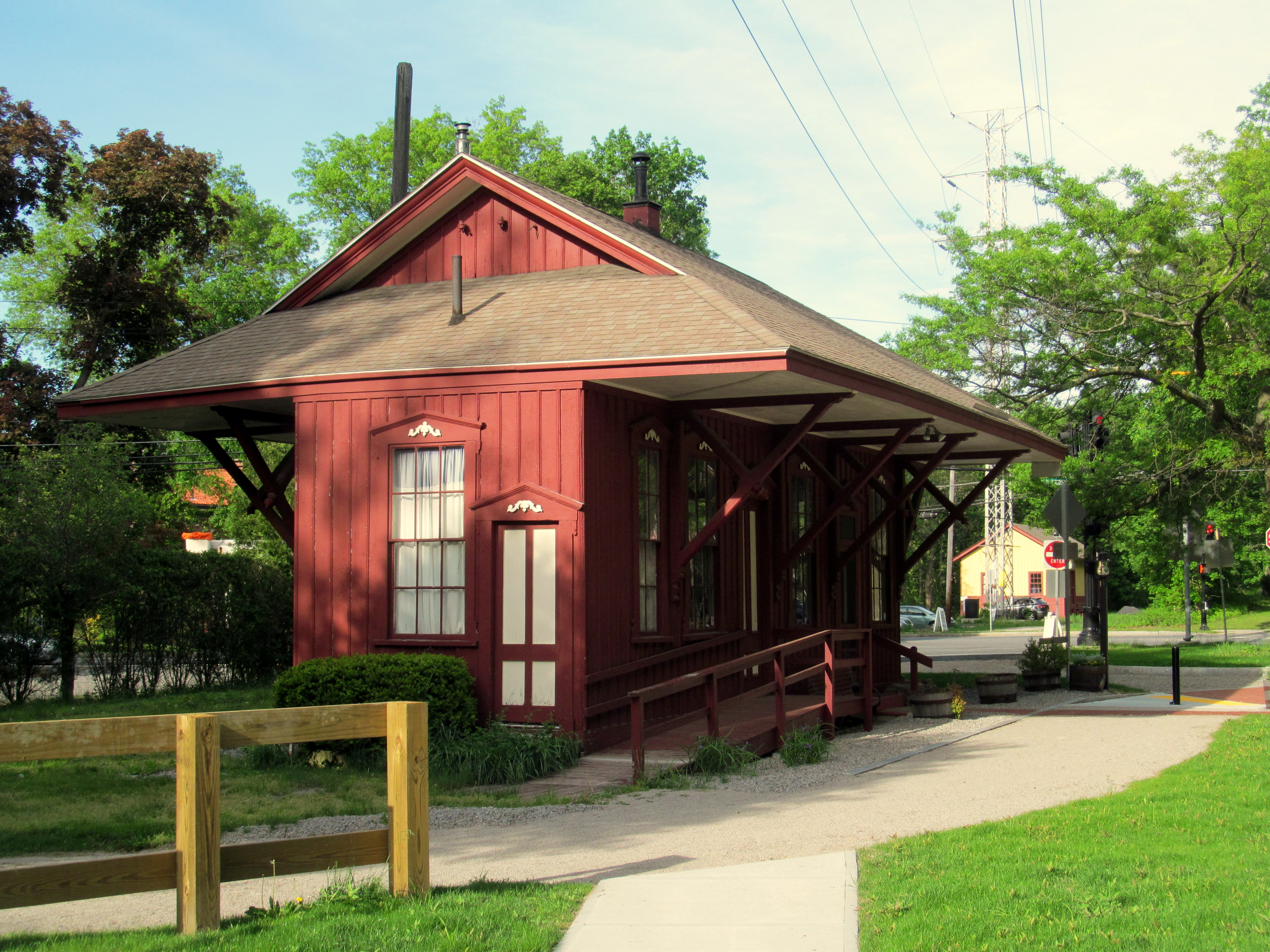
- The station building at Wayland in May 2017

General information
- Location: Old Sudbury Road at Concord Road; Wayland, Massachusetts
- Coordinates: 42.364314°N 71.36179°W
- Owner: Town of Wayland
- Lines: Massachusetts Central Railroad; Central Massachusetts Branch (Boston & Maine); Central Mass Branch (MBTA)
- Platforms: 1
- Tracks: 1

History
- Opened: 1881
- Closed: 1971

Former services
Preceding station	MBTA	Following station
East Sudbury toward South Sudbury	Central Mass Branch (closed 1971)	Tower Hill toward North Station
Preceding station	Boston and Maine Railroad	Following station
East Sudbury toward Northampton	Central Mass Branch	Tower Hill toward Boston
Location

Wayland station is a former railroad station in Wayland, Massachusetts. Originally built by the Massachusetts Central Railroad in 1881, by 1885 it was operated by the Central Massachusetts Railroad, and it was later part of the Boston and Maine Railroad. The MBTA subsidized service at the station beginning in 1965. It was closed in 1971 when service on the Central Mass Branch was terminated due to poor track conditions. Since 1980, The Wayland Depot, a charitable women's consignment craft shop, has operated out of the station, which is now owned by the Town of Wayland. The Wayland Depot's mission includes preservation of the historic station. In 2017, a stone dust section of the Mass Central Rail Trail—Wayside was built over the section of the ROW the station was built to service, which is planned to be paved in 2027.

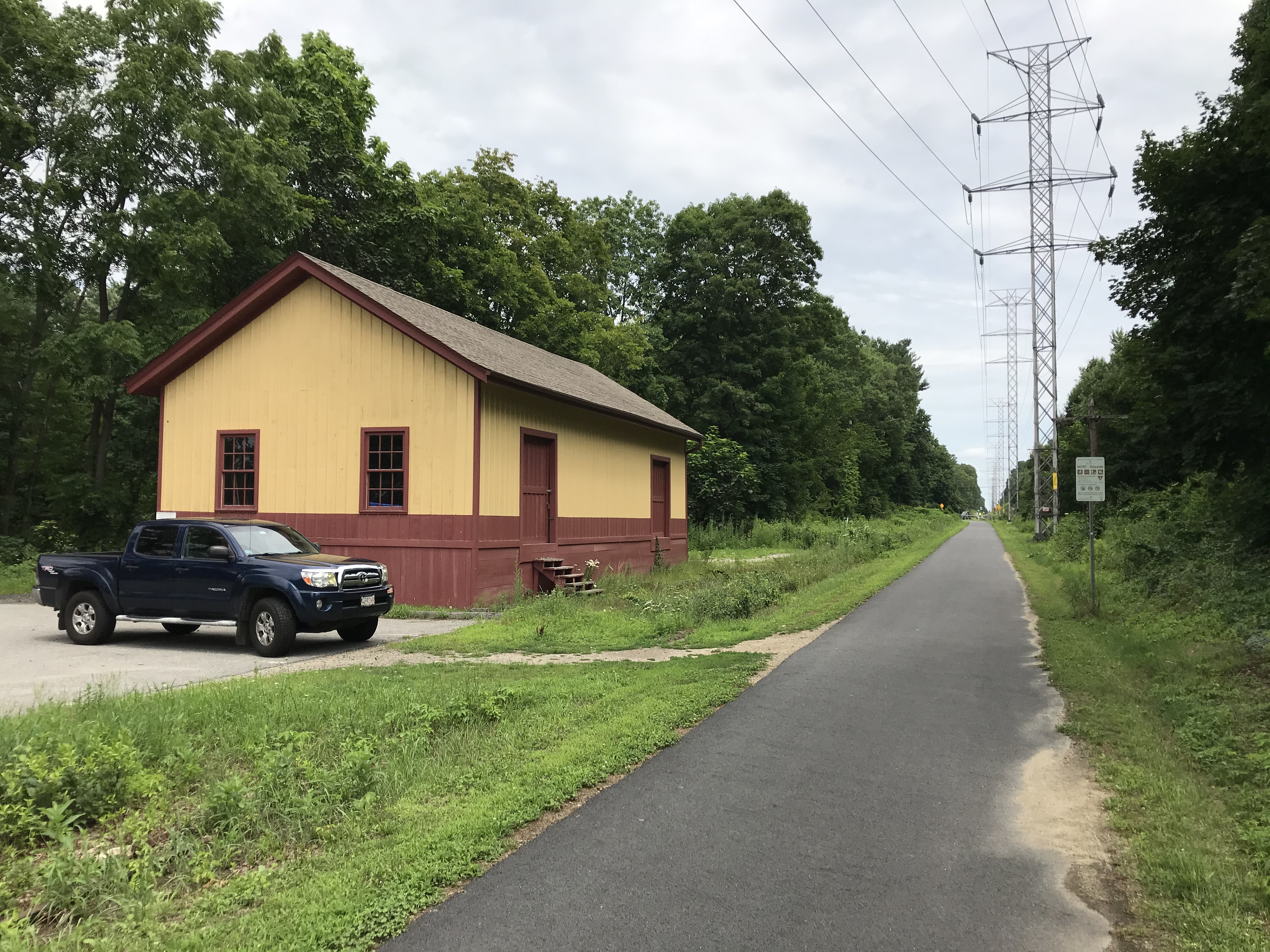
Massachusetts Central Railroad Freight House next to MCRT—Wayside

Wayland had separate buildings for passengers and freight. Approximately 300 feet from the station, the Wayland Freight House is the only freight house still standing on the Central Mass line. It was built in 1881 at the same time as the station, and would store items of freight that were to be sent or had arrived and were waiting to be claimed by recipients. It is owned by the Town of Wayland and was restored with original paint colors. This section of the Mass Central Rail Trail—Wayside was paved in 2019.
