= Waltham Highlands station =

Former railway station in Waltham, MA

Waltham Highlands
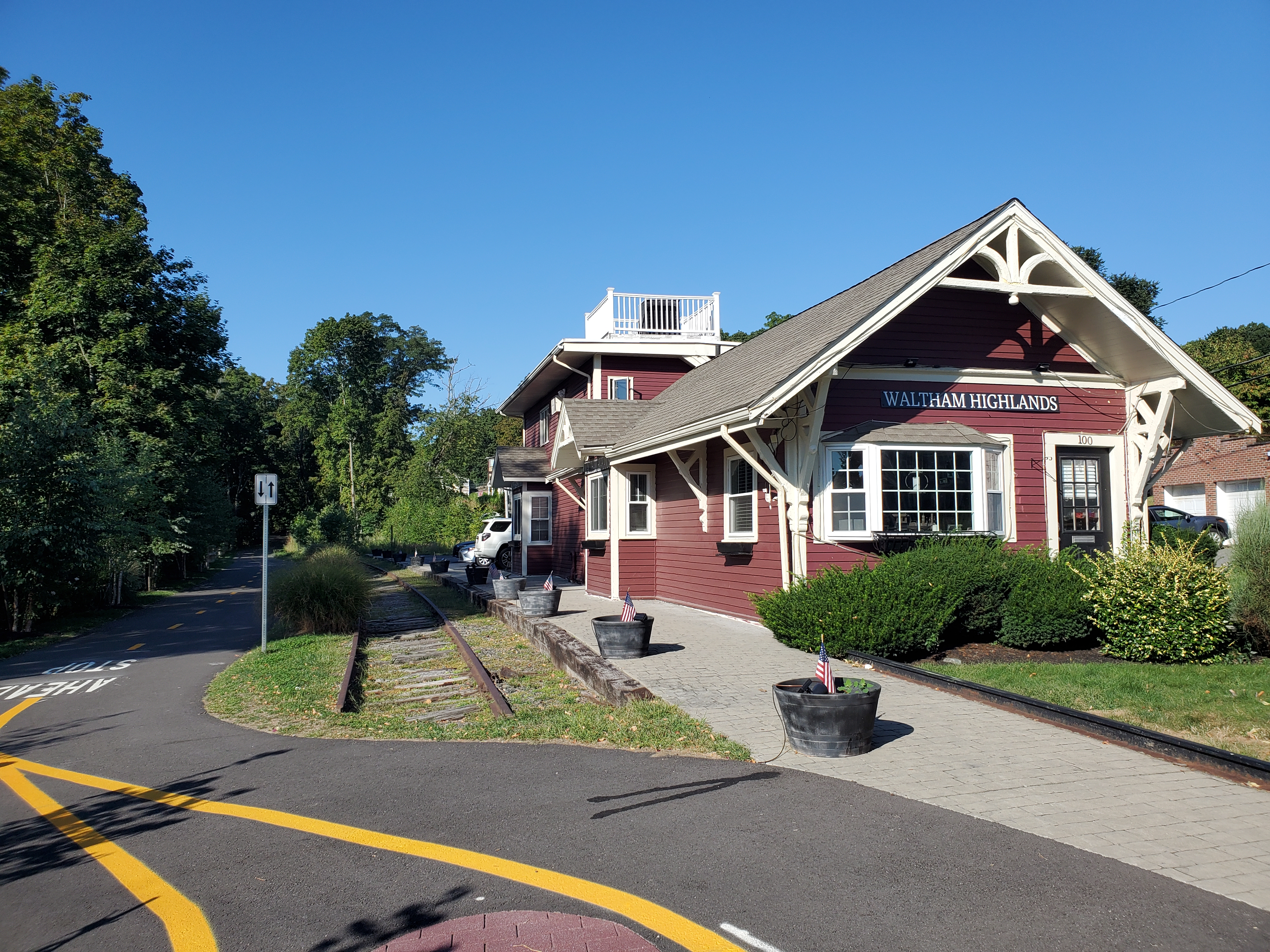
- The former Waltham Highlands station building in 2024

General information
- Location: 100 Hammond Street; Waltham, Massachusetts
- Coordinates: 42.379896°N 71.246971°W
- Lines: Massachusetts Central Railroad; Central Massachusetts Branch (Boston & Maine); Central Mass Branch (MBTA)
- Platforms: 1
- Tracks: 1

History
- Opened: 1881
- Closed: November 26, 1971

Former services
Preceding station	MBTA	Following station
Weston toward South Sudbury	Central Mass Branch (closed 1971)	Waltham North toward North Station
Preceding station	Boston and Maine Railroad	Following station
Weston toward Northampton	Central Mass Branch	Waltham North toward Boston
Location

Waltham Highlands station is a former railroad station in Waltham, Massachusetts. Originally established by the Massachusetts Central Railroad in 1881 and operated by the Central Massachusetts Railroad in 1885, it was incorporated into the MBTA Commuter Rail with MBTA subsidies in 1965. It was located on Hammond Street north of the Waltham town center. It was closed on November 26, 1971, when service on the Central Mass Branch was terminated due to poor track conditions and low ridership. The station building remains, with some modifications, and is used as an insurance agency. In 2023, a paved section of the Mass Central Rail Trail—Wayside was built on the railbed past the former station.
