= Cherry Brook station =

Railway station in Weston, Massachusetts

Cherry Brook
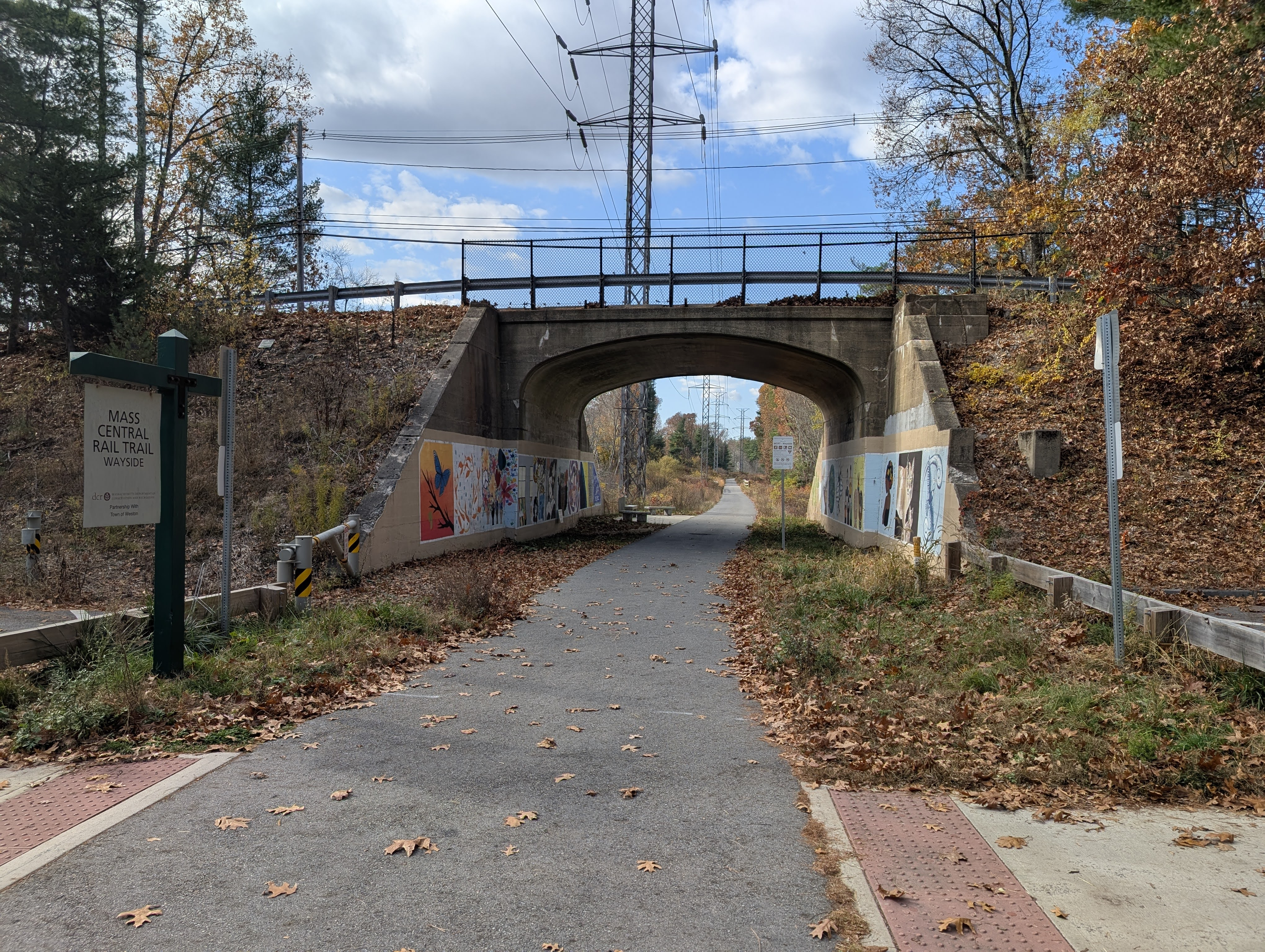
- Former site of Cherry Brook station in November 2024

General information
- Location: Weston, Massachusetts
- Coordinates: 42.37163°N 71.30816°W
- Owner: MBTA
- Lines: Massachusetts Central Railroad; Central Massachusetts Branch (Boston & Maine); Central Mass Branch (MBTA)
- Platforms: 1
- Tracks: 1

History
- Opened: Before October 9, 1882
- Closed: Unstaffed after 1913, permanently closed November 26, 1971, demolished 1999

Former services
Preceding station	MBTA	Following station
Tower Hill toward South Sudbury	Central Mass Branch (closed 1971)	Weston toward North Station
Preceding station	Boston and Maine Railroad	Following station
Tower Hill toward Northampton	Central Mass Branch	Weston toward Boston
Location

Cherry Brook station was a former train station in Weston, Massachusetts, named for the nearby Cherry Brook flowing north-south.

== Background ==
Cherry Brook station was created by the Massachusetts Central Railroad by 1882. By 1885 the successor Central Massachusetts Railroad provided service, and by 1887 the Boston and Maine Railroad (B&M) leased the ROW and named it the Central Massachusetts Branch. B&M service was subsidized by the MBTA and added to the MBTA Commuter Rail system in 1965.

Never more than a simple shelter, Cherry brook station had various versions in different shapes and sizes. The adjacent underpass at Concord Road was constructed in 1911.

During much of its lifetime, this station was a flag stop, so the train would stop for passengers a piece of metal on top of a pole was rotated. The station was not staffed after 1913, but it continued as a flag stop until November 26, 1971, when service on the Central Mass Branch was terminated due to poor track conditions and low ridership. After years of neglect and vandalism, it was demolished in 1999.

In 2019, a paved section of the Mass Central Rail Trail—Wayside was built over the section of the ROW the station was built to service.
