= For Kids Sake =

American television campaign

- Genre: Educational
- Presented by: Various (see below)
- Narrated by: Various (see below)
- Country of origin: United States

Production
- Production location: Various locations throughout the United States
- Running time: 30-90 minutes

Original release
- Network: WBZ-TV; Syndication
- Release: March 4, 1985 – 1996

For Kids' Sake is an American public service announcement (PSA) campaign launched by Westinghouse Broadcasting and Boston's then-NBC television station WBZ-TV in March 1985, featuring educational, health, and safety messages for children. The campaign encourages parents to "take the time to give and care" to ensure a brighter future for children across the United States. Despite the show targeting at adults age 25 and 54, For Kids' Sake is a two-year campaign (multi-year on some stations) that aired in most television markets throughout the 1980s, with a small number of stations continuing into portions of the 1990s. The campaign, by market, was sponsored by various national corporations, such as McDonald's and True Value, and local businesses such as dealerships, hospitals, and regional grocery store chains.

== History ==
For Kids' Sake started life as a special three-part series produced by WBZ's Channel 4 Eyewitness News team on March 4, 1985, encouraging viewers on why growing up in the future was more difficult "than what it used to be". The series explains the pressures of experiencing drugs, alcohol, and sex, as well as contending struggles with family life, racial harmony, and technology with an uncertain future. Later that year, WBZ and Westinghouse produced its own primetime television series based out of its context. Throughout the 1985 season, the campaign was so successful that Group W expanded For Kids' Sake to all of its owned-and-operated stations at the start of 1986, beginning with then-NBC affiliate KYW-TV in Philadelphia that January. By the end of the year, the show expanded to non-Westinghouse stations and became a stable in local television across the United States, airing in a total of 115 stations from Big Four networks, independent stations, and superstations. Over a span of four years between 1988 and 1992, Group W created three more public service vignette campaigns, A Time to Care, Thanks to the Teachers, and Celebrate America, with A Time to Care being the concept's sequel to For Kids' Sake.

== List of affiliates ==
As of 1987 and 1988 combined, a total of 115 television stations carried the campaign, one station by each market and covering nearly 70% of the country's viewership.

State	Media market	Station	Channel	Affiliation	Launch of campaign
Alabama	Birmingham	WBMG	42	CBS	1987
Alabama	Huntsville	WAFF-TV	48	NBC	1987
Alabama	Mobile	WKRG-TV	5	CBS	1987
Alabama	Montgomery	WSFA	12	NBC	1987
Arizona	Phoenix	KPNX	12	NBC	1987
Arkansas	Fort Smith	KFSM-TV	5	CBS	1987
Arkansas	Little Rock	KATV	7	ABC	1987
California	Fresno	KSEE-TV	24	NBC	1987
California	Los Angeles	KTTV	11	FOX	1987
California	Sacramento	KTXL-TV	40	FOX	1987
California	San Francisco	KPIX-TV	5	CBS	1986
California	Santa Cruz	KMST	46	CBS	1987
Colorado	Denver	KWGN-TV	2	IND	1987
Connecticut	Hartford	WFSB	3	CBS	1987
District of Columbia	Washington, D.C.	WTTG-TV	5	FOX	1987
Florida	Fort Myers	WINK-TV	11	CBS	1987
Florida	Jacksonville	WJKS-TV	17	NBC	1987
Florida	Miami	WPLG	10	ABC	1987
Florida	Orlando	WOFL-TV	35	FOX	1987
Florida	Panama City Beach	WMBB-TV	13	ABC	1987
Florida	Tampa	WXFL	8	NBC	1987
Florida	West Palm Beach	WPTV	5	NBC	1987
Georgia	Atlanta	WXIA-TV	11	NBC	1986
Georgia	Augusta	WRDW-TV	12	CBS	1987
Hawaii	Honolulu	KHON-TV	2	NBC	1987
Idaho	Idaho Falls	KIFI-TV	8	ABC	1987
Illinois	Chicago	WGN-TV	9	IND	1987
Illinois	Moline	WQAD-TV	8	ABC	1987
Indiana	Evansville	WFIE-TV	14	NBC	1987
Indiana	Indianapolis	WTHR-TV	13	NBC	1987
Indiana	South Bend	WNDU-TV	16	NBC	1987
Iowa	Cedar Rapids	KCRG-TV	9	ABC	1987
Iowa	Des Moines	KCCI-TV	8	CBS	1987
Kansas	Topeka	WIBW-TV	13	CBS	1987
Kansas	Wichita	KAKE-TV	10	ABC	1987
Kentucky	Louisville	WAVE-TV	3	NBC	1986
Kentucky	Lexington	WKYT-TV	27	CBS	1987
Louisiana	Baton Rouge	WBRZ-TV	2	ABC	1986
Louisiana	New Orleans	WDSU	6	NBC	1987
Louisiana	Shreveport	KSLA-TV	12	CBS	1987
Maine	Bangor	WLBZ-TV	2	NBC	1987
Maine	Portland	WCSH-TV	6	NBC	1987
Maryland	Baltimore	WJZ-TV	13	CBS	1986
Massachusetts	Boston	WBZ-TV	4	NBC	1985
Michigan	Detroit	WJBK-TV	2	CBS	1987
Michigan	Flint	WNEM-TV	5	CBS	1987
Michigan	Grand Rapids	WOTV	8	NBC	1987
Minnesota	Duluth	KDLH-TV	3	CBS	1987
Minnesota	Minneapolis	KARE-TV	11	NBC	1987
Missouri	Kansas City	KCTV-TV	5	CBS	1987
Missouri	Springfield	KYTV-TV	3	NBC	1987
Missouri	St. Louis	KMOV-TV	4	CBS	1987
Montana	Billings	KTVQ	2	CBS	1987
Montana	Great Falls	KRTV	3	CBS	1987
Nebraska	Omaha	WOWT-TV	6	NBC	1987
Nevada	Reno	KOLO	8	ABC	1987
New Mexico	Albuquerque	KOB-TV	4	NBC	1987
New York	Albany	WNYT-TV	13	NBC	1987
New York	Buffalo	WGRZ-TV	2	NBC	1986
New York	New York City	WNYW-TV	5	FOX	1987
New York	Rochester	WHEC-TV	10	CBS	1987
New York	Syracuse	WSTM-TV	3	NBC	1987
North Carolina	Charlotte	WBTV	3	CBS	1987
North Carolina	Greensboro	WGHP	8	ABC	1987
North Carolina	Raleigh	WTVD-TV	11	CBS	1987
Ohio	Cincinnati	WLWT-TV	5	NBC	1987
Ohio	Cleveland	WJW-TV	8	CBS	1987
Ohio	Toledo	WTOL-TV	11	CBS	1987
Oklahoma	Lawton	KSWO-TV	7	ABC	1987
Oklahoma	Oklahoma City	KOCO-TV	5	ABC	1987
Oklahoma	Tulsa	KJRH-TV	2	NBC	1987
Oregon	Eugene	KVAL-TV	13	CBS	1987
Oregon	Portland	KPTV-TV	12	IND	1987
Pennsylvania	Harrisburg	WGAL-TV	8	NBC	1986
Pennsylvania	Philadelphia	KYW-TV	3	NBC	1986
Pennsylvania	Pittsburgh	KDKA-TV	2	CBS	1986
Pennsylvania	Scranton	WNEP-TV	16	ABC	1987
Rhode Island	Providence	WPRI-TV	12	ABC	1987
South Carolina	Charleston	WCSC-TV	5	CBS	1987
South Carolina	Greenville	WYFF-TV	4	NBC	1986
South Carolina	Myrtle Beach	WBTW-TV	13	CBS	1987
Tennessee	Memphis	WREG-TV	3	CBS	1987
Tennessee	Knoxville	WBIR-TV	10	NBC	1987
Tennessee	Nashville	WSMV-TV	4	NBC	1987
Texas	Amarillo	KAMR-TV	4	NBC	1987
Texas	Austin	KTVV	36	NBC	1987
Texas	Beaumont	KFDM-TV	6	CBS	1987
Texas	Corpus Christi	KRIS-TV	6	NBC	1987
Texas	Dallas	KTVT	11	IND	1987
Texas	El Paso	KVIA-TV	7	ABC	1987
Texas	Houston	KRIV-TV	26	FOX	1988
Texas	Lufkin	KTRE	9	ABC	1987
Texas	San Antonio	KMOL	4	NBC	1986
Texas	Tyler	KLTV	7	ABC	1987
Utah	Salt Lake City	KTVX-TV	4	ABC	1987
Vermont	Burlington	WCAX-TV	3	CBS	1987
Virginia	Bristol	WCYB-TV	5	NBC	1987
Virginia	Richmond	WTVR-TV	6	CBS	1987
Virginia	Roanoke	WDBJ	7	CBS	1987
Virginia	Virginia Beach	WAVY-TV	10	NBC	1987
Washington	Seattle	KOMO-TV	4	ABC	1987
Washington	Spokane	KXLY-TV	4	ABC	1987
West Virginia	Charleston	WOWK-TV	13	CBS	1987
Wisconsin	Green Bay	WFRV-TV	5	ABC	1987
Wisconsin	Madison	WISC-TV	3	CBS	1987
Wisconsin	Milwaukee	WCGV-TV	24	FOX	1987

== See also ==
- Children's television series
- List of local children's television series (United States)
