= Marlborough =

Marlborough or the Marlborough may refer to:

== Places ==
=== Australia ===
- Marlborough, Queensland
- Principality of Marlborough, a short-lived micronation in 1993
- Marlborough Highway, Tasmania; Malborough was an historic name for the place at the southern end, also known as Bronte.

=== Canada ===
- Marlborough, Calgary, neighbourhood in Calgary
- Marlborough Park, Calgary, neighbourhood in Calgary
- Marlborough Mall, shopping center in Calgary
- Marlborough Township, Ontario

=== Indonesia ===
- Fort Marlborough, a fortress in the city of Bengkulu, from the British era
- Jalan Malioboro, the main street (jalan) of the city of Yogyakarta, the name of which is believed to be an Indonesianised version of Marlborough

=== Ireland ===
- Marlborough Street, Dublin, a street running parallel to O'Connell street in Dublin

=== Malaysia ===
- Marlborough College Malaysia, an international school in Johor

=== New Zealand ===
- Marlborough District, a local government district
- Marlborough Province, from 1859 to 1876
- Marlborough Sounds
- Marlborough wine region
- Marlborough, part of the Glenfield suburb of Auckland

=== United Kingdom ===
- Marlborough (ward), Harrow, London
- Marlborough, Wiltshire
  - Marlborough College, public school
- Marlborough (UK Parliament constituency)
- The Marlborough C of E School, Woodstock, Oxfordshire
- The Marlborough Science Academy, a secondary school and sixth form college in St Albans, Hertfordshire

=== United States ===
==== California ====
- Marlborough School (Los Angeles), all-girl college prep school

==== Connecticut ====
- Marlborough, Connecticut, town in Hartford County

==== Massachusetts ====
- Marlborough, Massachusetts, city in Middlesex County
- New Marlborough, Massachusetts, town in Berkshire County

==== Missouri ====
- Marlborough, Missouri, village in St. Louis County

==== New Hampshire ====
- Marlborough, New Hampshire, town in Cheshire County
  - Marlborough (CDP), New Hampshire, the main village in the town

==== New York ====
- Marlborough, New York, town in Ulster County

==== Pennsylvania ====
- Marlborough Township, Pennsylvania
- East Marlborough Township, Chester County, Pennsylvania
- West Marlborough Township, Pennsylvania

=== Zimbabwe ===
- Marlborough, a suburb of Harare
  - Marlborough High School, a secondary education school in Harare

== People ==
- John Churchill, 1st Duke of Marlborough (1650–1722), 18th-century British commander
  - For subsequent dukes, see Duke of Marlborough (title)
- Earl of Marlborough, a title in the peerage of England
- Henry Marlborough, 14th-century English politician, MP for Guildford
- Morgan Marlborough (born 1990), American footballer
- Norm Marlborough (born 1945), Australian politician
- Thomas of Marlborough (died 1236), English monk and writer

== Cars ==
- Marlborough (Anglo-French car), made between 1906 and 1926
- Marlborough (New Zealand car), made between 1912 and 1920
- Marlborough-Thomas, British, made between 1923 and 1924

== Ships ==
- HMS Marlborough, the name of several Royal Navy ships
  - HMS St Michael (1669), a second-rate, renamed Marlborough 1706–1762
  - HMS Marlborough (1767), a third-rate, 1767–1800
  - HMS Marlborough (1807), a third-rate, 1807–1835
  - HMS Marlborough (1855), a first-rate, 1855–1924
  - HMS Marlborough (1912), a battleship, 1912–1932
  - HMS Marlborough (F233), a frigate, 1989–2008 (sold to the Chilean Navy)
- Marlborough (1876 ship), British merchant sailing ship, 1876–1890

== Other uses ==
- The Marlborough, an apartment building in Kalamazoo, Michigan, U.S.
- Marlborough (New Zealand electorate), centered on the Marlborough region
- Marlborough (wine), a wine region in New Zealand
- Marlborough Fine Art, an international art gallery headquartered in London, England
- Marlborough House, London, England
- Old Marlborough Road, in Massachusetts
  - "The Old Marlborough Road", a poem by Henry David Thoreau
- Toronto Marlborough Athletic Club, an ice hockey team in Toronto, Ontario

== See also ==
- Malborough, village in Devon, England
- Marlborough College (disambiguation) (includes all schools)
- Marlboro (disambiguation)
