= Torsion bar suspension =

Vehicle suspension that uses a torsion bar

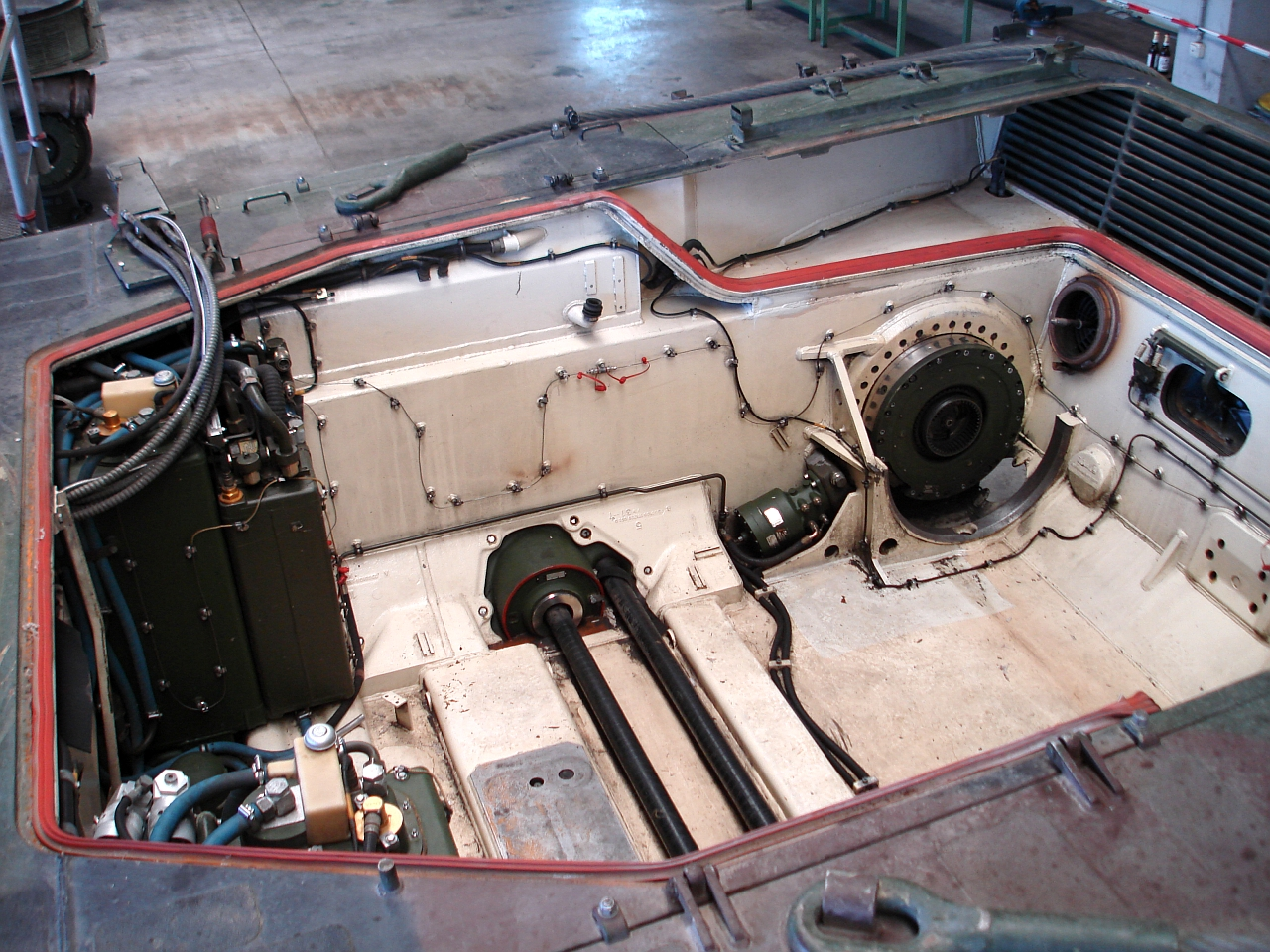
Torsion bar suspension inside Leopard 2

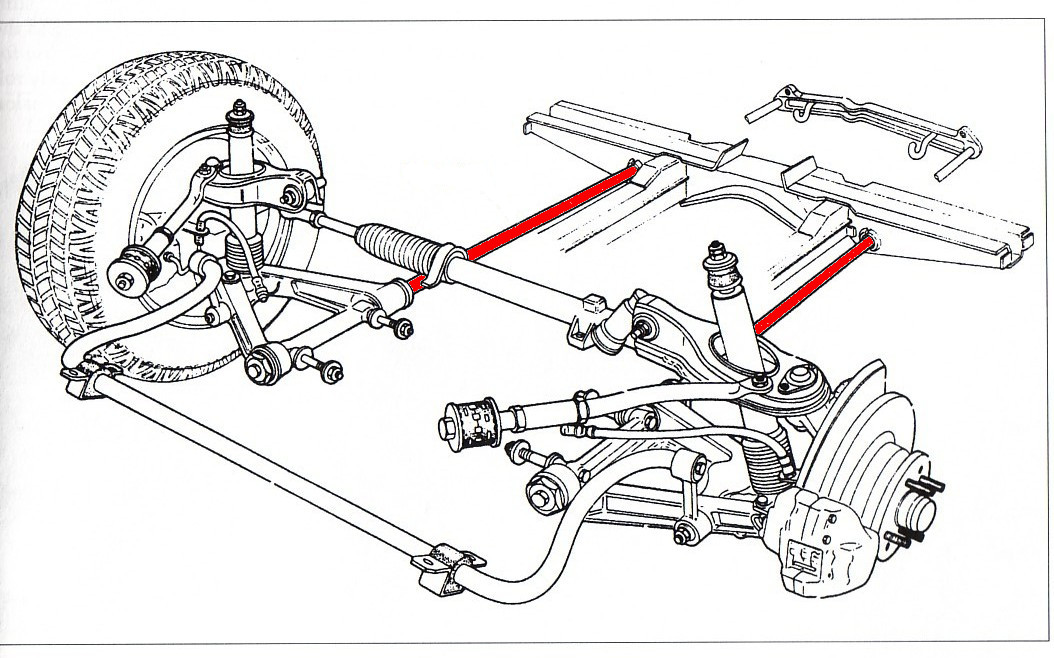
Schematic of a front axle highlighted to show torsion bar.

A torsion bar suspension, also known as a torsion spring suspension, is any vehicle suspension that uses a torsion bar as its main weight-bearing spring. One end of a long metal bar is attached firmly to the vehicle chassis; the opposite end terminates in a lever, the torsion key, mounted perpendicular to the bar, that is attached to a suspension arm, a spindle, or the axle. Vertical motion of the wheel causes the bar to twist around its axis and is resisted by the bar's torsion resistance. The effective spring rate of the bar is determined by its length, cross section, shape, material, and manufacturing process.

== Historical development ==
The concept of the torsion bar suspension gained prominence in the automotive industry in the early 20th century, with notable advancements occurring around World War II when it was adopted in military armored fighting vehicles (AFVs) due to its robustness and ability to navigate rough terrain. Early designs of automobiles relied heavily on leaf springs, but innovations such as those developed by manufacturers like Citroën introduced torsion bars, which allowed for greater flexibility and comfort compared to traditional systems.

== Usage ==
Torsion bar suspensions are used on combat vehicles and tanks like the T-72, Leopard 1, Leopard 2, M26 Pershing, M18 Hellcat, M46/M47/M48 Patton, M60 and the M1 Abrams (many tanks from World War II used this suspension), and on modern trucks and SUVs from Ford, Chrysler, GM, Mitsubishi, Mazda, Nissan, Isuzu, LuAZ, and Toyota. Class 8 truck manufacturer Kenworth also offered a torsion bar suspension for its K100C and W900A models, up to about 1981.

Manufacturers change the torsion bar or key to adjust the ride height, usually to compensate for engine weight.

== Advantages and disadvantages ==
The main advantages of a torsion bar suspension are soft ride due to elasticity of the bar, durability, easy adjustability of ride height, and small profile along the width of the vehicle. It takes up less of the vehicle's interior volume than coil springs.

Torsion bars reached the height of their popularity on mass-production road cars in the middle of the 20th century at the same time that unitary construction was being adopted. At a time when the mechanics of stress and metal fatigue in unitary body frames was poorly understood, torsion bars were very attractive to vehicle designers as the bars could be mounted to reinforced parts of the central structure, typically the bulkhead. Using MacPherson struts to achieve independent front suspension with coil springs meant providing strong turrets in the frontal structure of the car.

A disadvantage is that torsion bars, unlike coil springs, usually cannot provide a progressive spring rate. In most torsion bar systems, ride height (and therefore many handling features) may be changed by simply adjusting bolts that connect the torsion bars to the frame cross member. In most cars with this type of suspension, swapping torsion bars for a different spring rate is usually an easy task. Longitudinal torsion bars extend under the passenger compartment, cutting into interior space by raising the floor, while in transverse systems, torsion bar length is limited by vehicle width.

== Leveling ==
Some vehicles use torsion bars to provide automatic leveling, using a motor to pre-stress the bars to provide greater resistance to load and, in some cases (depending on the speed with which the motors can act), to respond to changes in road conditions. Height adjustable suspension has been used to implement a wheel-change mode where the vehicle is raised on three wheels so that the remaining wheel is lifted off the ground without the aid of a jack.

== History ==
The first vehicle to use torsion bars was the Leyland Eight designed by J. G. Parry-Thomas and produced from 1920 to 1923, however its rear suspension, patented in 1919, was retrospectively named "torsion bar assisted" by Leyland in a 1966 publication because the bars only complemented the leaf springs. Less than two dozen cars (including racing variants) were produced, and the suspension was only ever used again on Marlborough-Thomas racing cars few years later.

In 1923 Parry-Thomas patented an updated design featuring a true torsion bar design with no leaf springs, however the inventor's death in a car crash in 1927 prevented its further development. Therefore the invention is often credited to the Porsche GmbH, which patented it in 1931 and later used it in many designs.

In 1934, the front wheel drive Citroën Traction Avant was the first to implement the idea in a serially produced car, featuring independent front torsion bar suspension and a flexible trailing dead axle, also sprung by torsion bars. The flexibility of the axle beam provided wheel location features like a twist beam axle. Also in the 1930s, Porsche's prototypes of the first Volkswagen Beetle incorporated torsion bars—especially their transverse mounting style. Czechoslovak Tatra's 1948 T600 Tatraplan employed rear torsion bar suspension, the only Tatra to do so.

The system first saw military use in the Swedish Stridsvagn L-60 tank of 1934. Its suspension was developed by German engineers, including Porsche employee Karl Rabe who also held patents on torsion bar suspensions personally.

It was used extensively in European cars like Renault, Citroën and Porsche/Volkswagen, by less known producers like Mathis and Röhr in the 1930s, as well as by American Packard in the 1950s. The Packard used torsion bars at both front and rear, and interconnected the front and rear systems to improve ride quality. Morris Minor and Oxford from the late 1940s onwards used a front torsion bar system very similar to the Citroën, as did the Riley RM models. The revolutionary Jaguar E-Type introduced in 1961 had a torsion bar front suspension very similar to the Citroën and Morris Minor, and an independent coil spring rear suspension using four shock absorbers with concentric springs (coilover).

An early application of a torsion bar in an American car was by Hudson Motor Car Company of Detroit who had introduced the innovative front axle flex suspension in 1934 Hudson and Terraplane cars and realized for 1935 that a transverse torsion bar linked to the rear axle was needed as an anti-roll bar to stabilize the cars. The single torsion bar was mounted through the frame sides behind the rear axle and then attached by arms and links to the front side of the spring U-bolt plates. Axle flex was discontinued for the 1936 model year.

Gladeon M. Barnes and Warren E. Preston filed a US patent application for a torsion bar suspension in 1934, which was approved two years later. The original feature of the patent was what is now called tube-over-bar (TOB) design which only saw limited use in the 1960s (for example, on LVTP-7). Even though Barnes was employed by the US Army Ordnance Department, torsion bars were not used in American armor designs until the T70 GMC in 1943, which suspension was derived from Pz. III by GM engineer Robert Schilling.

Post-war the use of torsion bar front suspension was a defining feature of British Morris cars, starting with the Morris Minor of 1948, its larger Morris Oxford MO counterpart and the upmarket Morris Six MS, plus the Wolseley-badged upmarket variants of the latter two models. The designer of these cars, Alec Issigonis, was inspired by the Traction Avant's suspension, although the Morris cars were rear-wheel drive and used conventional leaf springs for their rear axles. The Minor used lever arm dampers with its torsion bars while the Oxford and the Six used innovative telescopic dampers. The Minor remained in production largely unchanged until 1972 and was replaced by the Morris Marina which also used the torsion bar-lever arm damper system for its front suspension—one of the last new cars worldwide to be introduced with the system and which remained in production until 1984. The Oxford/Six platform was developed through several revised series which used Issigonis' torsion bar system until 1959 when the new Farina Oxford was introduced using front suspension with coil springs, lower wishbones and lever arm dampers.

The most famous American passenger car application of the torsion bar, was the Chrysler system used beginning with all Chrysler products starting with the 1957 model year in cars such as the Imperial Crown series, Chrysler Windsor, DeSoto Firedome, Dodge Coronet and Plymouth Belevedere although Chrysler's "Torsion-Air" suspension was only for the front axle; the same basic system (longitudinal mounting) was maintained until the 1981 introduction of the K-car. A reengineered torsion bar suspension, introduced with the 1976 Dodge Aspen, introduced transverse-mounted torsion bars (possibly based on the Volkswagen Type 3 passenger car) until production ended in 1989 (with Chrysler's M platform). Some generations of the Dodge Dakota and Durango used torsion bars on the front suspension.

General Motors first used torsion bars on their light-duty pickup trucks in 1960 until it was phased out in 1963 where traditional coil springs are used up front for their 2WD trucks. Its first use in a passenger car was in 1966, starting with the E-platform vehicles (Oldsmobile Toronado, Cadillac Eldorado), 4WD S-10 pickups and Astro vans with optional AWD, and since 1988, full size trucks and SUVs with 4WD (GMT400, GMT800, and GMT900 series).

Porsche used four-wheel torsion bar suspension for their 356 and 911 series from 1948 until 1989 with the introduction of the 964. They are also used in the front suspension of the 914 as well as the rear suspension of the 924, 944, and 968. Honda also used front torsion bars on the third generation Civic and other variants built on the same platform including the Ballade and first generation CRX.

== Variations ==
The German World War II Panther tank had double torsion bars. Needing bars longer than the width of the tank to get the required spring rate and maximum elastic bend angle from available steel alloys, designer Ernst Lehr created a suspension that effectively folded the bars in half. For each wheel, one rod was attached to the suspension arm, while another was mounted to a nearby point on the frame. On the opposite side of the tank, the two rods were attached to each other and fitted into a pivot. Deflection of the suspension arm caused both halves of the double torsion bar to twist. A disadvantage of the torsion bar suspension used in Tiger and Panther tanks (and many other WWII-era tanks and other AFVs) was the inability to incorporate an escape hatch through the bottom of the hull, a common feature of WWII-era tanks, as the torsion bar arrangement would have blocked crew access to such a hatch; however, the absence of leaf, coil or volute springs often left a large expanse of the side of the hull clear to include a side-escape hatch, and it was rare for a tank to be flipped over in such a way that all top-side hatches were unable to open, which is the purpose of ventral hatches.

Many contemporary main battle tanks use torsion bar suspension, including the American M1 Abrams, German Leopard 2, and Chinese MBT-3000, though the newest generation of tanks such as the Russian T-14 Armata utilize an adjustable hydraulic suspension. Due to their small size, tremendous load capacity, and relative ease of service, torsion bar suspension has been ideal for tanks, though it is not without disadvantage. The large travel and high elasticity of the torsion bars results in a "rocking" motion when the tank is moving or coming to a sudden stop. A gun stabilizer must be used to compensate for the rocking motion. Due to the massive weight of a main battle tank, compared to an automobile, there is a much greater risk of breaking a torsion bar on sudden bumps or maneuvers, and if it is not replaced in short order the reduced suspension can affect the maneuverability of the vehicle, and in extreme cases risk immobilizing the vehicle as the reduced capacity of the suspension causes additional torsion bars to break.

== Other uses ==
Torsion bars were sometimes used instead of conventional coil valve springs in some older motorcycles, such as the Honda CB450, and also on the Panhard Dyna X and Panhard Dyna Z cars of the 1950s. They were also used in the door mechanism of the DMC DeLorean automobile and trunk lids of some Toyota Corolla (E30) models.

== Bibliography ==
- United States Army Materiel Command (1963). "Chapter 11: The Suspension System". The Automotive Assembly: Research and Development of Materiel. Vol. 3. U.S. Government Printing Office.
- Xu, Guoying; Xue, Dabing; Wang, Tao (2017). Development and main research status of tracked vehicle suspension system (PDF). Advances in Engineering Research. Vol. 138. Academy of Armored Force Engineering.
- Merhof, Wolfgang; Hackbarth, Ernst-Michael (2015). Fahrmechanik der Kettenfahrzeuge (Driving mechanics of tracked vehicles) (PDF). Universität der Bundeswehr, Universitätsbibliothek. ISBN 978-3-943207-13-2.
