= André (car) =

Overview
- Manufacturer: T. B. André Ltd
- Production: 1933-1934; 6 made

Body and chassis
- Class: Light sports car

Powertrain
- Engine: 728 cc V-twin
- Transmission: 4 speed manual

André was a lightweight English two-seater sports car manufactured from 1933 to 1934 in London W11 by T. B. André.

== The cars ==
Only six of the automobiles, called the V6, which confusingly used a V-twin ohv JAP engine of 728cc, were ever built. Drive to the rear wheels was via a four speed gearbox. The floor pan acted also as the chassis and the suspension was by transverse leaf spring at the front and cantilevered springs at the rear. The car weighed 1170 pounds (531 kg) and was said to be able to achieve 65 mph (105 km/h) with an economy of 45 mpg_{‑imp} (6.3 L/100 km; 37 mpg_{‑US}).

== T. B. André ==
Theodore Bernard André had previously been involved in the manufacture of the Marlborough car produced by Malicet et Blin between 1909 and 1926, having taken over the UK dealership in 1909. He was also involved in the manufacture of Silent-bloc rubber bushed bearings; Hartford shock absorbers; Len Brake Co brake shoes; plus the Marlborough-Thomas from 1923 to 1924.

== See also ==
- List of car manufacturers of the United Kingdom
