= Marlborough College (disambiguation) =

Marlborough College is an English public (fee-charging) secondary school in Marlborough, Wiltshire, England.

Marlborough College or Marlborough School may also refer to:

== New Zealand ==
- Marlborough Boys' College, a state secondary school in Blenheim, New Zealand
- Marlborough Girls' College, a state secondary school in Blenheim, New Zealand
- Marlborough Primary School in Glenfield, New Zealand

== United Kingdom ==
- The Marlborough C of E School, a school in Woodstock, Oxfordshire, UK
- The Marlborough Science Academy, a secondary school in St Albans, Hertfordshire, England

== Other countries ==
- Marlborough College Malaysia, a British international school in Malaysia, sister school to Marlborough College in Wiltshire, England
- Marlborough Elementary School in Marlborough, British Columbia, Canada
- Marlborough High School, a secondary school in Harare, Zimbabwe
- Marlborough School (Los Angeles), an all-girl college prep school in Los Angeles, California. U.S.

== See also ==
- Marlboro College, a former private college in Marlboro, Vermont, U.S.
- Marlborough (disambiguation)
