= Malboro =

Malboro may refer to:

- Malborough, a village in the south of England
- a misspelling of Marlboro
- a monster in the Final Fantasy game series and spin-offs
