= Toyota Corolla (E30) =

Third generation of Toyota Corolla

Toyota Corolla (E30/E50)
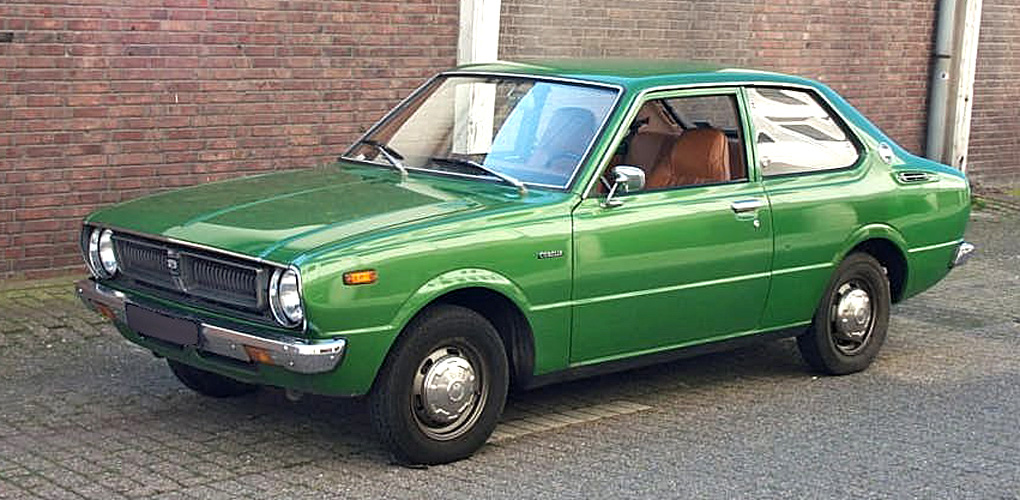

Overview
- Manufacturer: Toyota
- Model code: E30/E50
- Production: Aug 1974 – July 1981
- Assembly: Japan: Toyota City (Takaoka plant); Australia: Port Melbourne, Victoria (Australian Motor Industries); Indonesia: North Jakarta (Toyota Astra Motor); Malaysia: Shah Alam (UMW Toyota Motor); New Zealand: Thames (Toyota New Zealand); Philippines: Parañaque (Delta Motors Corporation); Thailand: Samut Prakan (Toyota Motor Thailand)
- Designer: Shiro Sasaki (1971)

Body and chassis
- Body style: 2/4-door sedan; 2-door coupé; 2-door hardtop coupé; 3-door liftback coupé; 3/5-door station wagon; 3-door van
- Layout: FR layout
- Related: Toyota Sprinter; Daihatsu Charmant

Powertrain
- Engine: 1.2 L 3K I4; 1.3 L 4K I4; 1.4 L T I4; 1.6 L 2T I4; 1.6 L 12T I4
- Transmission: 4-speed manual K40/T40; 5-speed manual K50/T50; 2-speed automatic A20; 3-speed automatic A30/A40; 3-speed automatic Trimatic T180, Australia)

Dimensions
- Wheelbase: 2,370 mm (93.3 in)
- Length: 3,995 mm (157.3 in)
- Width: 1,570 mm (61.8 in)
- Height: 1,375–1,390 mm (54.1–54.7 in)
- Curb weight: 785–955 kg (1,730.6–2,105.4 lb)

Chronology
- Predecessor: Corolla E20
- Successor: Corolla E70

The Corolla E30/E50 was the third generation of cars sold by Toyota under the Corolla nameplate. It was built from August 1974 to July 1981 and marked Toyota's greatest growth in the United States in the wake of the fuel crisis. In addition to its sister model, the Sprinter, there was a redesigned-body version built by Toyota affiliate Daihatsu, called the Daihatsu Charmant. While there were certain fourth-generation models with a longer model life, this generation, when considered as a whole, was the longest-lived one, possibly due to the worldwide recession in the 1970s. A large range of cars was built using this chassis, including Corollas, Sprinters, Daihatsu, and the sporty Levin and Trueno models with the DOHC motor, with a fuel injection upgrade added to Japanese Levin models in January 1977.

Even though the E30 and E50 series were replaced by the E70 series in August 1979 in most markets, the original E30 series and the facelifted E50 series both continued to be produced until July 1981.

== Design ==
The 3K engine was used in certain markets and later the 4K, while most Japanese and American models had the bigger 2T engine. A "Toyoglide" 2/3-speed automatic transmission was added as well as a four-speed (K40/T40) and five-speed (K50/T50) manual transmission, driving to the rear wheels. A three-door "liftback" (E50) and sports coupé (E51) was added in 1976. The E40 and E60 series were assigned to the Sprinter variants. In 1975, Toyota introduced the TTC-L (Toyota Total Clean-Lean Burn) on the 12T engine only, using a lean burn implementation. in 1976, Toyota introduced the TTC-C (Toyota total clean-Catalyst) on the 3K-U engine, using single bed catalytic converter and lambda close-loop oxygen sensor with a supercharger smog pump.

This generation offered as standard equipment a new windshield wiper and headlight switch installation, operated by levers attached to the steering column.

== Japan ==
Japanese market engines:

- 3K-B — 1.2 L (1166 cc) I4, 8-valve OHV, high compression, dual carb, 77 PS (57 kW) (SL grade KE30/35)
- 3K-BR — 1.2 L (1166 cc) I4, 8-valve OHV, low compression, dual carb, 74 PS (54 kW) (SL grade KE30/35)
- 3K-C — 1.2 L (1166 cc) I4, 8-valve OHV, carb, 55 PS (40 kW) (KE30/35)
- 3K-U — 1.2 L (1166 cc) I4, 8-valve OHV, carb, 1976/01-1979/08 (KE50)
- 3K-H — 1.2 L (1166 cc) I4, 8-valve OHV, carb, 71 PS (52 kW) (KE30 sedan and commercial vehicles only)
- T — 1.4 L (1407 cc) I4, 8-valve OHV, carb, 86 PS (63 kW) (TE30/35)
- T-B — 1.4 L (1407 cc) I4, 8-valve OHV, high compression, dual carb, 95 PS (70 kW) (SL grade TE30/35)
- T-BR — 1.4 L (1407 cc) I4, 8-valve OHV, low compression, dual carb, 91 PS (67 kW) (SL grade TE30/35)
- T-U — 1.4 L (1407 cc) I4, 8-valve OHV, carb, 82 PS (60 kW) (TE50)
- 2T-B — 1.6 L (1588 cc) I4, 8-valve OHV, high compression, dual carb, 105 PS (77 kW) (GSL/SR grade TE31/37)
- 2T-BR — 1.6 L (1588 cc) I4, 8-valve OHV, low compression, dual carb, 100 PS (74 kW) (GSL/SR grade TE31/37)
- 2T-C — 1.6 L (1588 cc) I4, 8-valve OHV, carb, 75 PS (55 kW)
- 2T-G — 1.6 L (1588 cc) I4, 8-valve DOHC, carb, 110 PS (81 kW) (Levin/GT grade)
- 2T-U — 1.6 L (1588 cc) I4, 8-valve OHV, carb, 90 PS (66 kW) (GSL/SR grade TE51)
- 12T — 1.6 L (1588 cc) I4 8-valve OHV, carb and TTC-L lean burn system, 85 PS (63 kW) (TE52)
- 12T-U — 1.6 L (1588 cc) I4 8-valve OHV, carb and TGP, 88 PS (65 kW) (TE56)

Japanese market chassis:

- E30 — Sedan, 2-door/4-door (3K, T)
- E31 — Sedan, 2-door/4-door (2T)
- E35 — Hardtop coupé (3K, T)
- E37 — Hardtop coupé (2T)
- E50 — Sports coupé (3K, T)
- E51 — Sports coupé (2T)
- E52 — Sports coupé (12T)

The 40- and 60-series model codes were reserved for the Corolla's slightly more expensive Sprinter sibling.

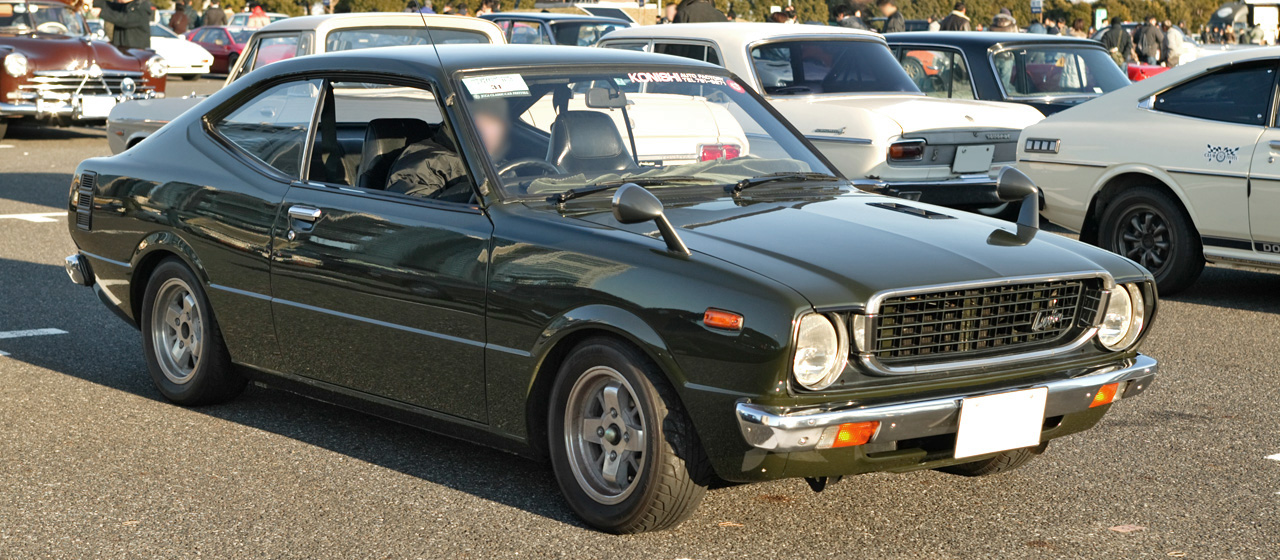
1974–1977 Corolla (TE37) Levin coupé

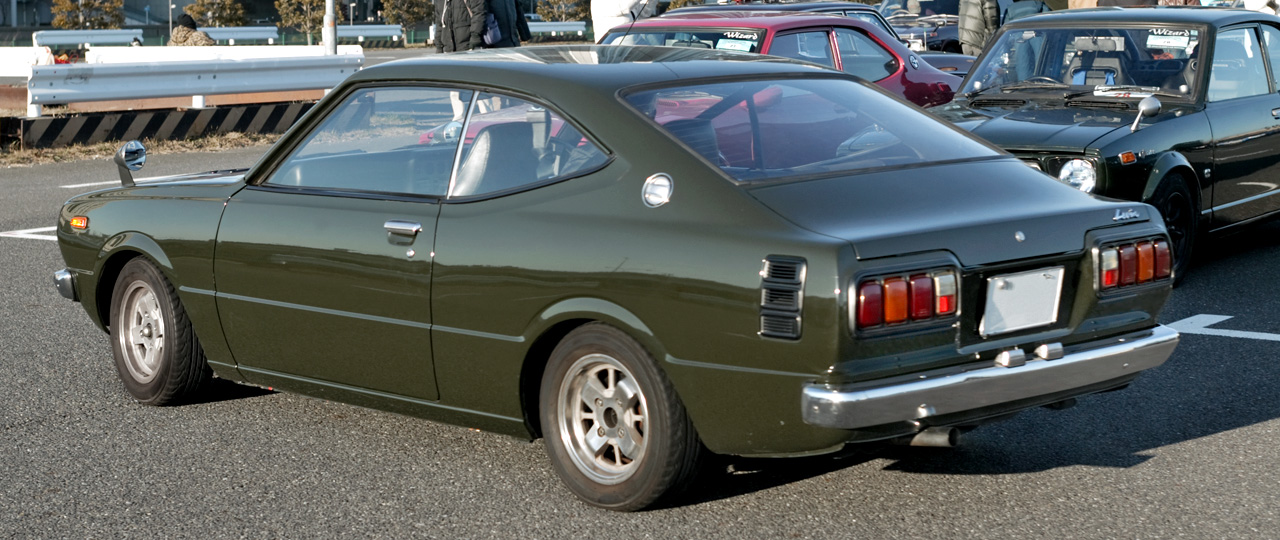
1974–1977 Corolla (TE37) Levin coupé

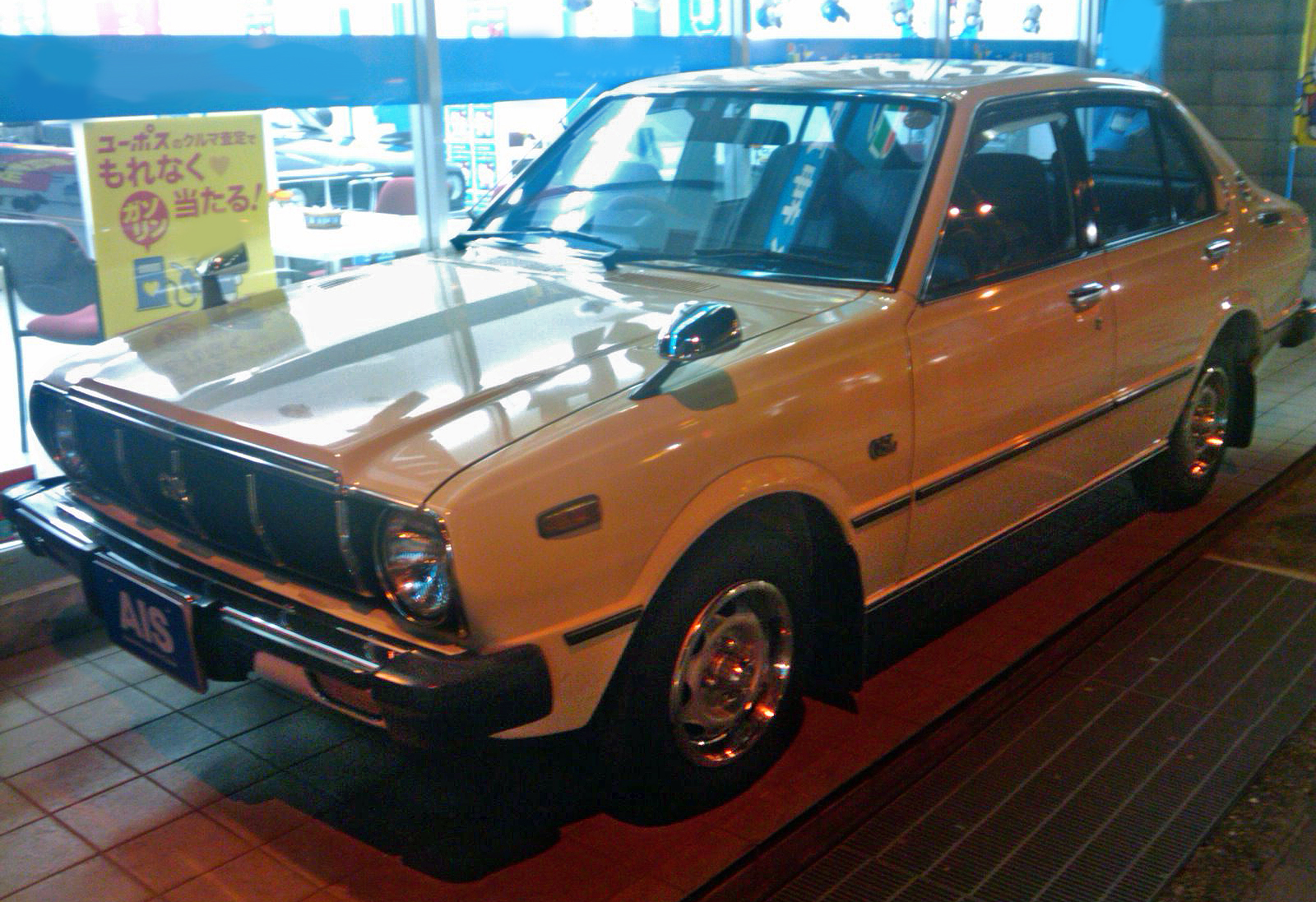
Corolla 1600 GSL (TE31) four-door sedan

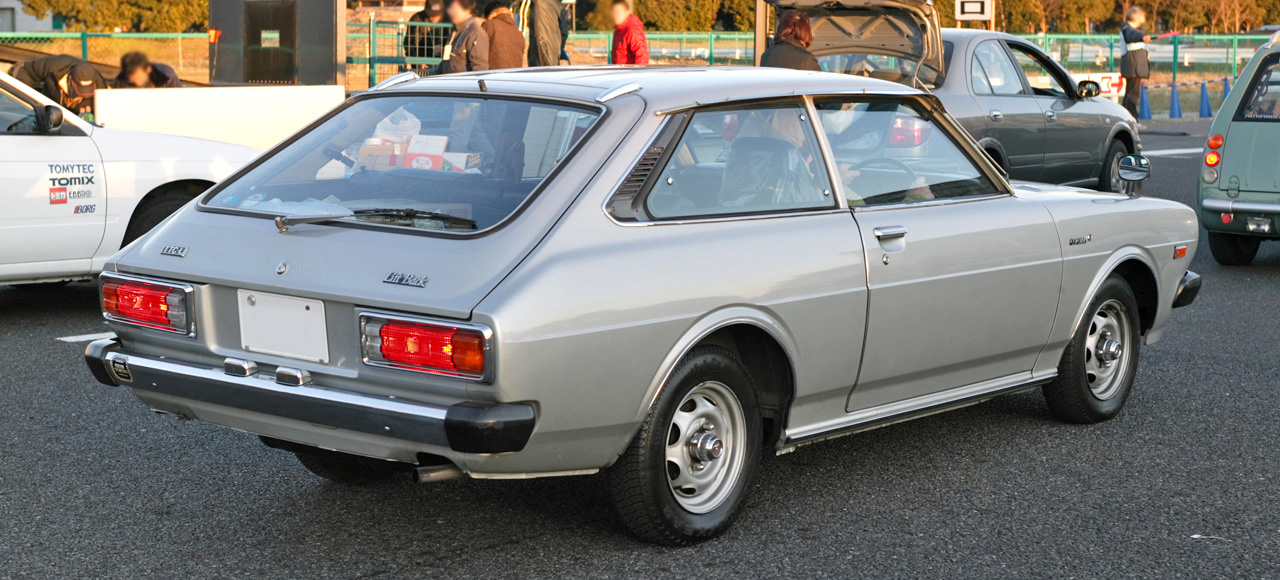
Corolla 1600 (TE52) liftback

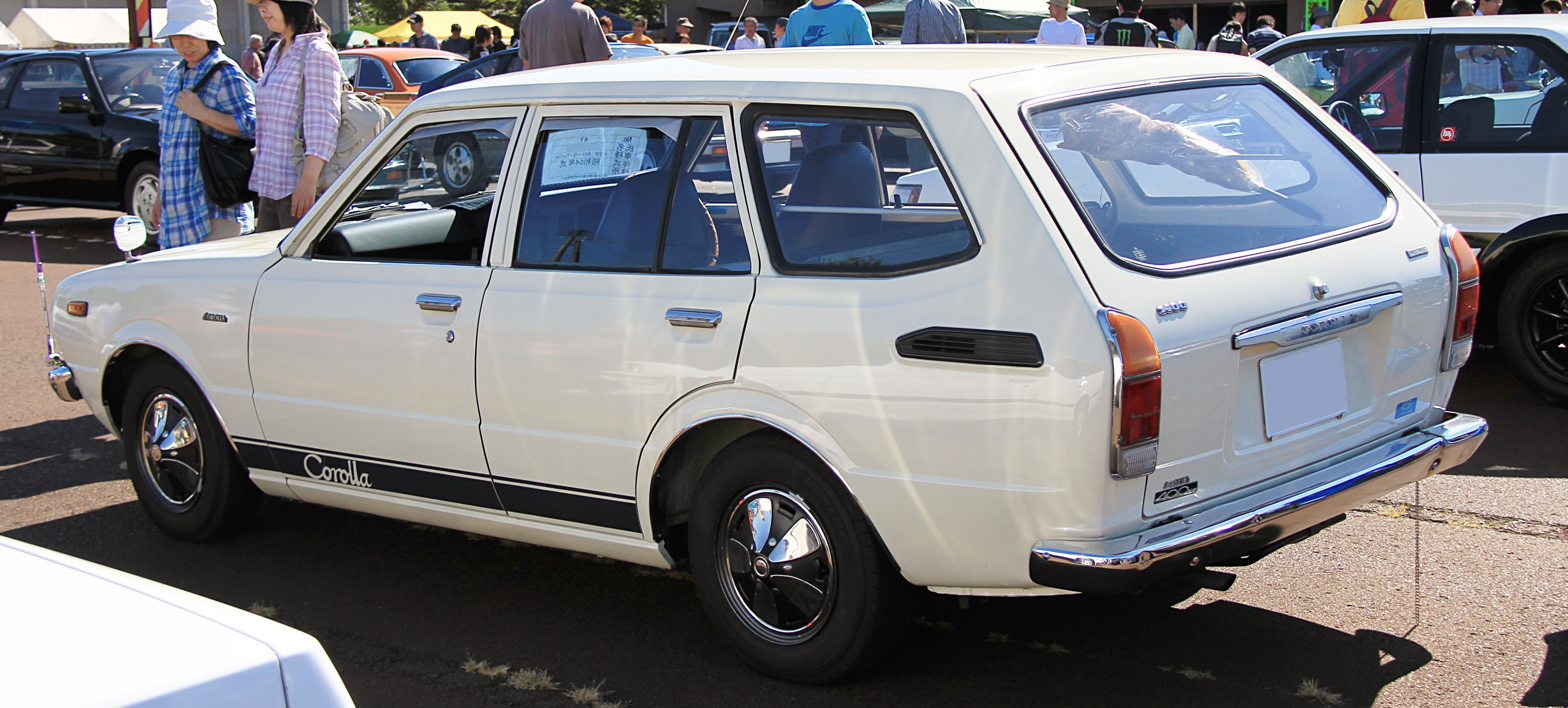
1979 Corolla 1400 Deluxe (TE36V) five-door van

== North America ==
Introduced to North America in late 1974, for the 1975 model year, the base model cost US$2,711 (equivalent to $16,221 in 2025), but only the Deluxe model had features comparable to the contemporary pack listed at US$2,989 (equivalent to $17,884 in 2025). The SR5 models included a tachometer, more sporty steel wheels, and were only available with the 2T-C engine and T50 5-Speed transmission. Additionally, the differential was shorter, resulting in better acceleration.

In 1975, for the 1976 model year, the Corolla received a minor facelift, including a revised grille and new bonnet with a raised centre section and a single, offset vent. Additionally, two new body styles were added: the Liftback and Sport Coupe. These had a different body and design language, but shared most mechanical parts with the sedans.

In 1978, for the 1979 model year, the Corolla received another minor facelift, which included a more squared-off grille and raised bonnet section. The asymmetrical bonnet vent was replaced with 2 at the side.

The E30 series 2T-C engines outmatched the rival Datsun B210's engine output.

North American market engines:

- 3K-C — 1.2 L (1166 cc) I4, 8-valve OHV, carburetor, 41 kW (55 hp)
- 4K-C — 1.3 L (1290 cc) I4, 8-valve OHV, carburetor, 45 kW (60 hp)
- 2T-C — 1.6 L (1588 cc) I4, 8-valve OHV, carburetor, 56 kW (75 hp)

North American market chassis:

- E31 — Sedan, 2-door/4-door (Std, DX)
- E38 — Wagon, 5-door (Std, DX)
- E37 — Hardtop coupé (DX, SR5)
- E51 — Sports coupé (Std, SR5)
- E51 — Liftback, 3-door (Std, SR5)
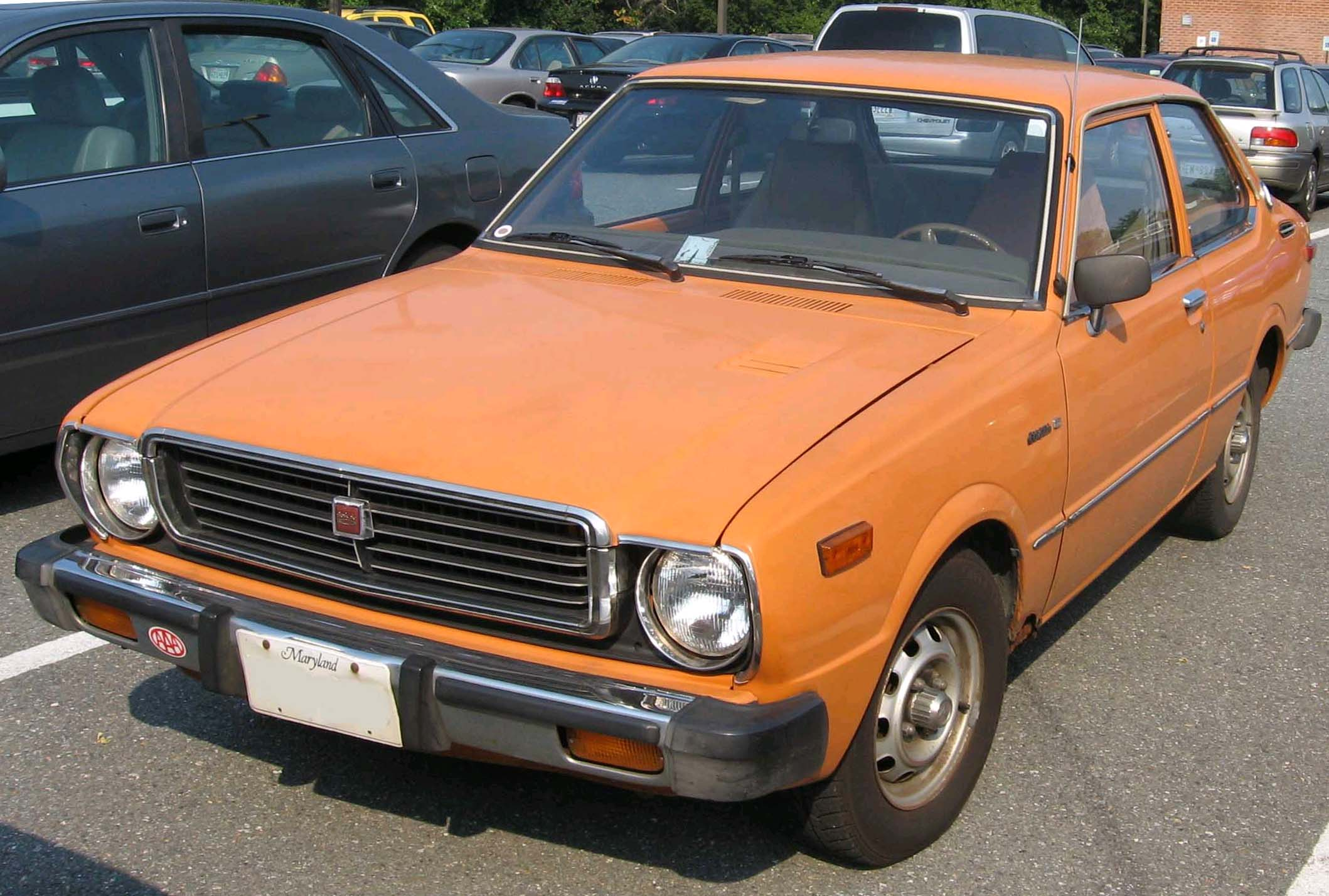
1976–1978 Corolla Deluxe 2-door sedan (US, MY 1977–1978)

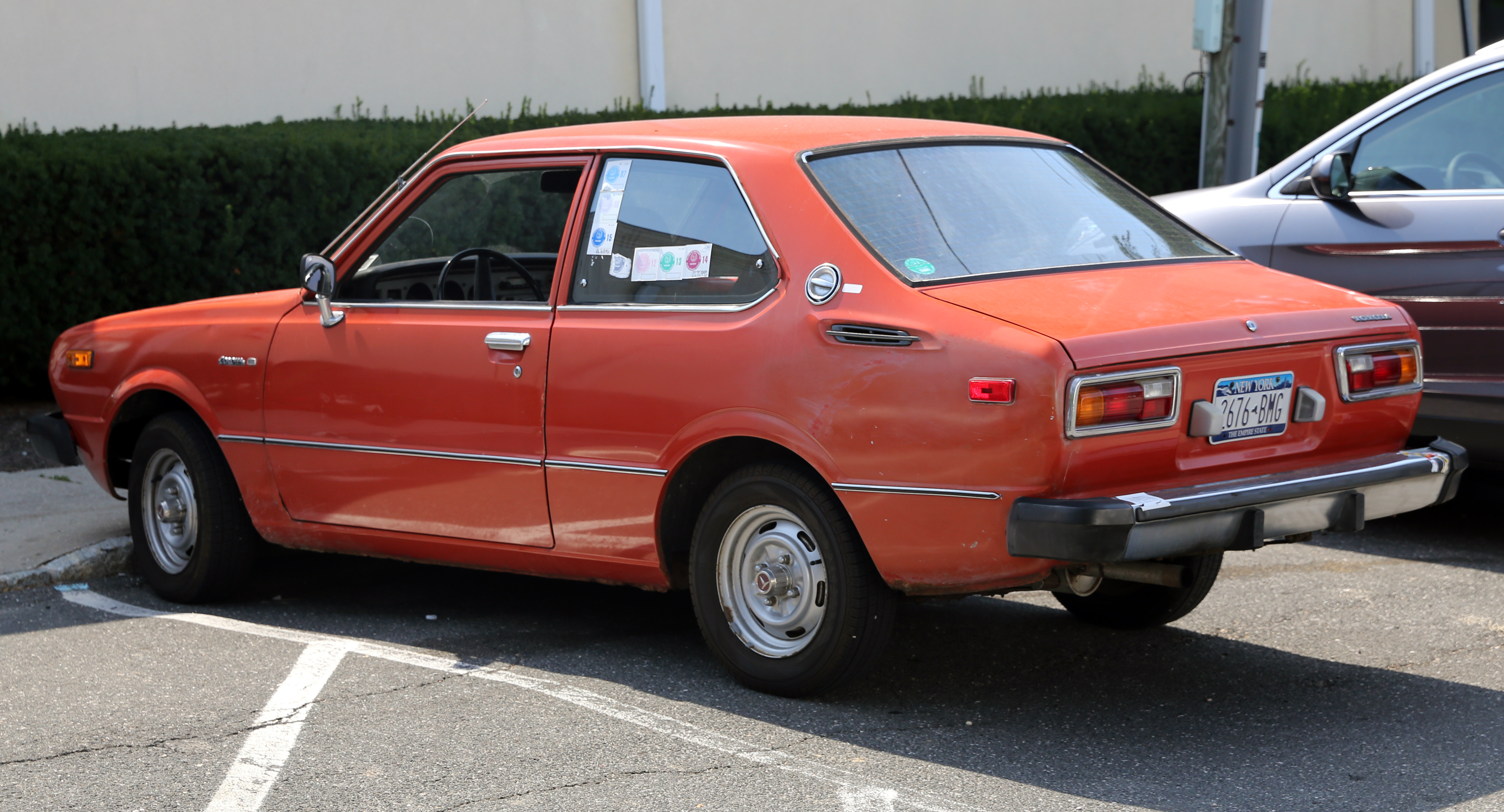
1977 Corolla Deluxe 2-door sedan (US)

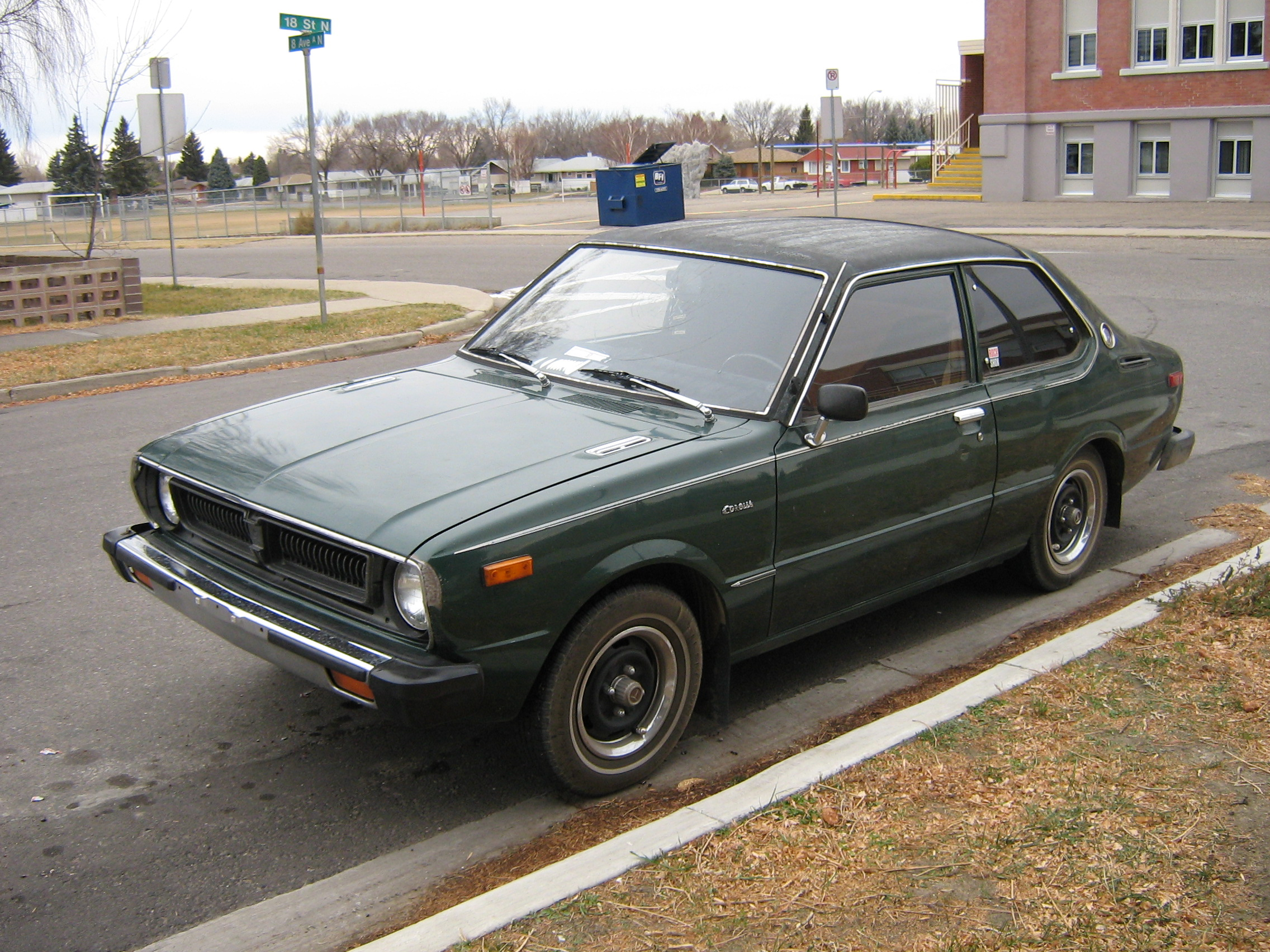
1974–1976 Corolla Deluxe 2-door sedan (Canada, MY 1975/1976)

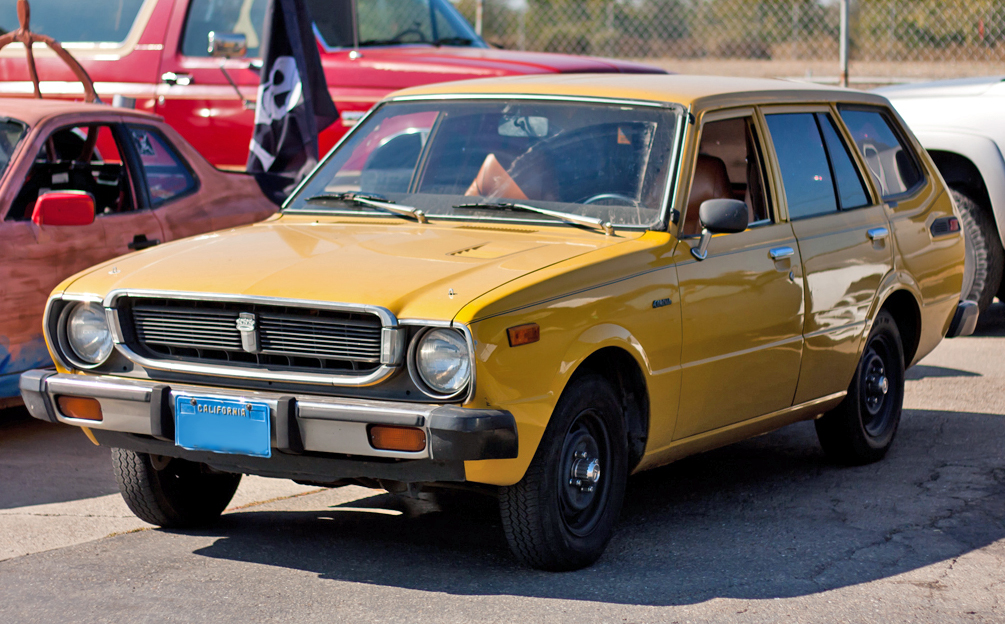
1976 Corolla Deluxe Wagon (US)

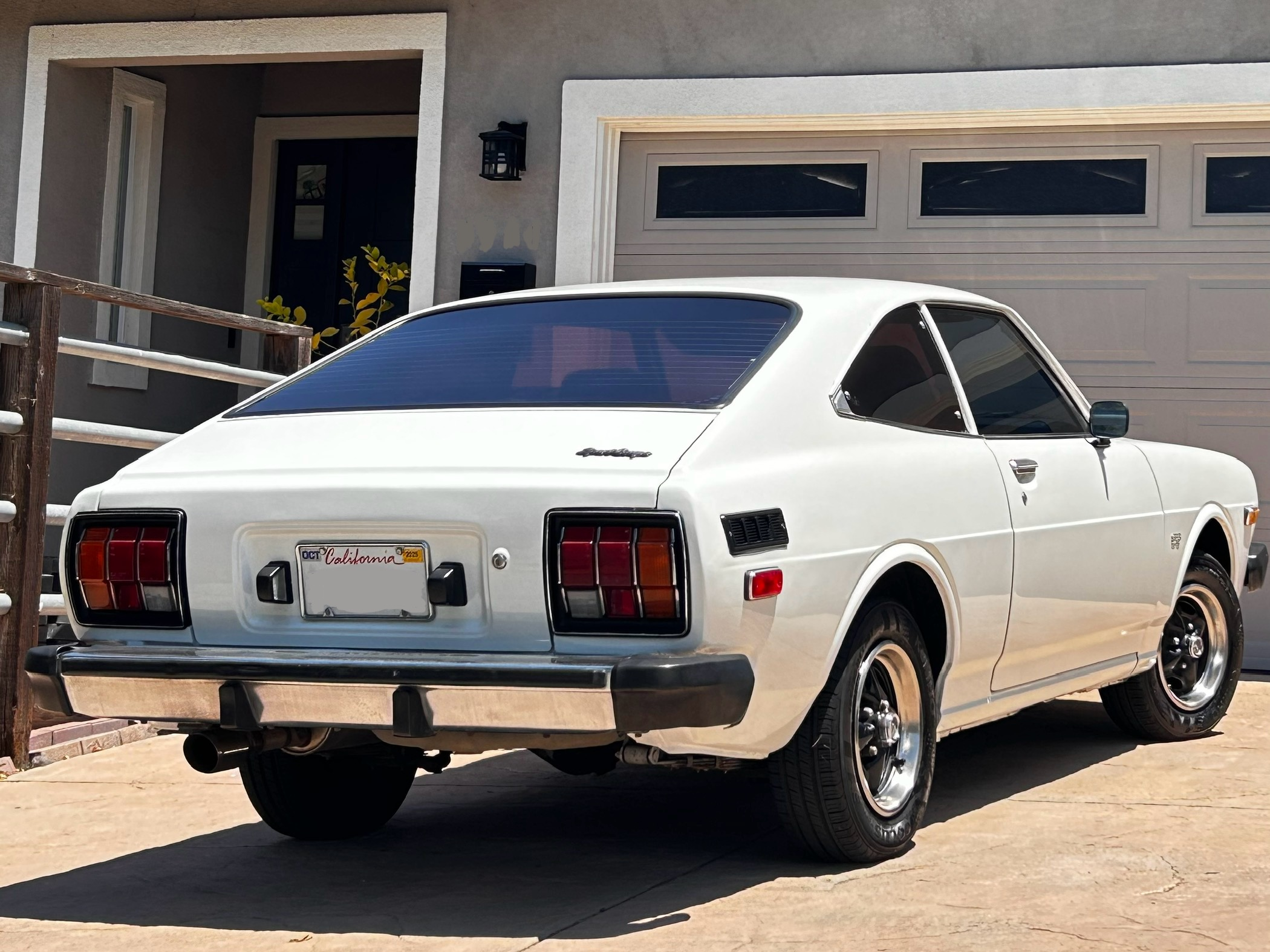
1976 Corolla SR5 Sport Coupe TE51 (US)

=== Reception ===
Road & Track was critical of the 1975 Corolla, calling it "large and heavy" and "expensive" compared to the Honda Civic and Datsun B210. They also criticized the "relatively crude rear suspension", lack of interior space, and poor fuel economy when compared to the VW Rabbit.

Emissions became a problem further into the 1970s (especially with the 3K engine), which became popular because of its low fuel consumption. Its replacement, the 4K engine, came with Toyota TTC emissions equipment but only produced 60 hp (45 kW), despite a greater 1,290 cc displacement.

== Europe ==
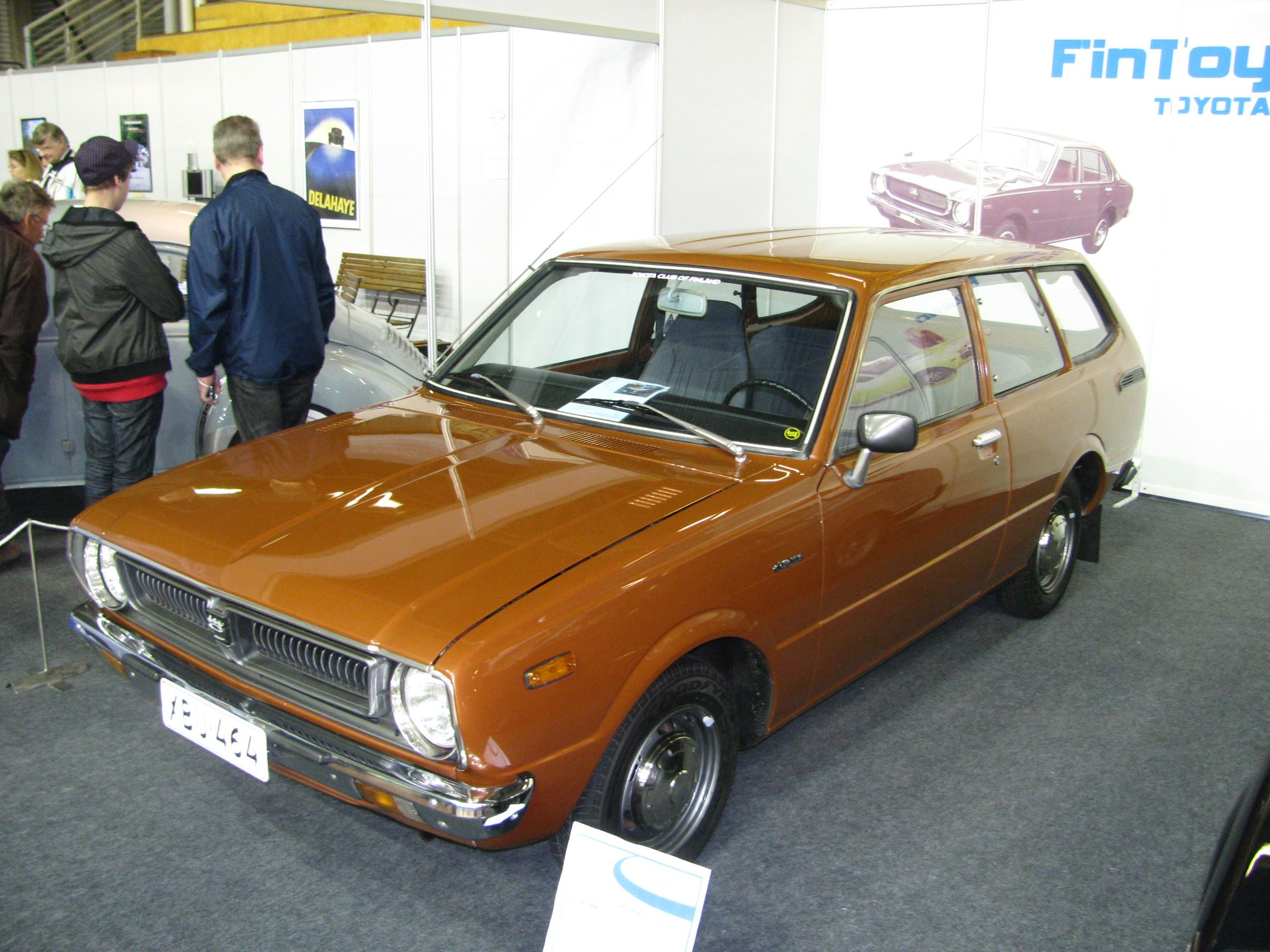
Toyota Corolla Wagon (KE36)

In Europe, the third generation Corolla was offered in the same body styles as in the US. All the sedans and wagons, along with the Hardtop coupé, were only offered with the 1.2-litre 3K, while the Liftback occasionally had the bigger 2T engine. The preceding 20-series Corolla continued to be available for as much as two years as a cheaper alternative, only with the two-door sedan body. A small facelift for the 1977 model year saw a redesigned dashboard and additional trim colours for the interior, and a new grille with small twin horizontal steel beams across it. For the 1979 model year, the last year of the E30 in Europe, the sedan's exterior trim was redesigned for the Deluxe model option with new tail lights (without the plastic chromed surrounds) and another new grille.

== Australia ==
The Corolla was manufactured in Australia at AMI-Toyota's Port Melbourne production facility. It was a popular car on the Australian market and most body styles available elsewhere were utilized. All variants originally came with Toyota's 1166 cc 3K-C engine, which was replaced by the 1290 cc 4K-C engine for the update released in November 1978.

Originally released in the SE trim, a luxury CS model was later released in February 1976. The CS featured carpeting, a clock, and reclining cloth seats. From July 1976, government regulated anti-pollution rules resulted in a loss of power for the further curtailed the 1166 cc 3K-C engine.

The first facelifted version of the Corolla in Australia was released in November 1978. Among the changes were a new grille and dashboard, along with revised interior trim. The previous 3K-C engine was superseded by the locally built 4K-C. At the same time, an entry-level SE version of the wagon was made available, with a range-topping XX coupé released in October 1979.

Due to the expenditure of manufacturing of the car in Australia, the production continued for several years after it was replaced by the next generation model everywhere else, although the TE72 Corolla Liftback was sold alongside as the Toyota T-18. A second facelift was released in July 1980, giving the car a new squared-off grille and rectangular headlamps, along with different tail lights on both sedan and hardtop; however it could not conceal the car's dated styling. This facelift coincided with minor interior trim changes, new seats, revised suspension settings, and a five-speed manual option. Production continued until July 1981, when the already aged fourth-generation E70 range replaced it.

Australian market engines:

- 1.2 L (1166 cc) 3K-C I4, 8-valve OHV, carb, 40 kW (54 hp)
- 1.3 L (1290 cc) 4K-C I4, 8-valve OHV, carb, 45 kW (60 hp)

Australian market chassis:

- KE30: two-door/four-door sedan
- KE35: two-door hardtop coupé
- KE36: three-door van, five-door wagon
- KE38: three-door van, five-door wagon
- KE50: two-door Liftback
- KE55: two-door hardtop coupé, four-door sedan, two-door Liftback
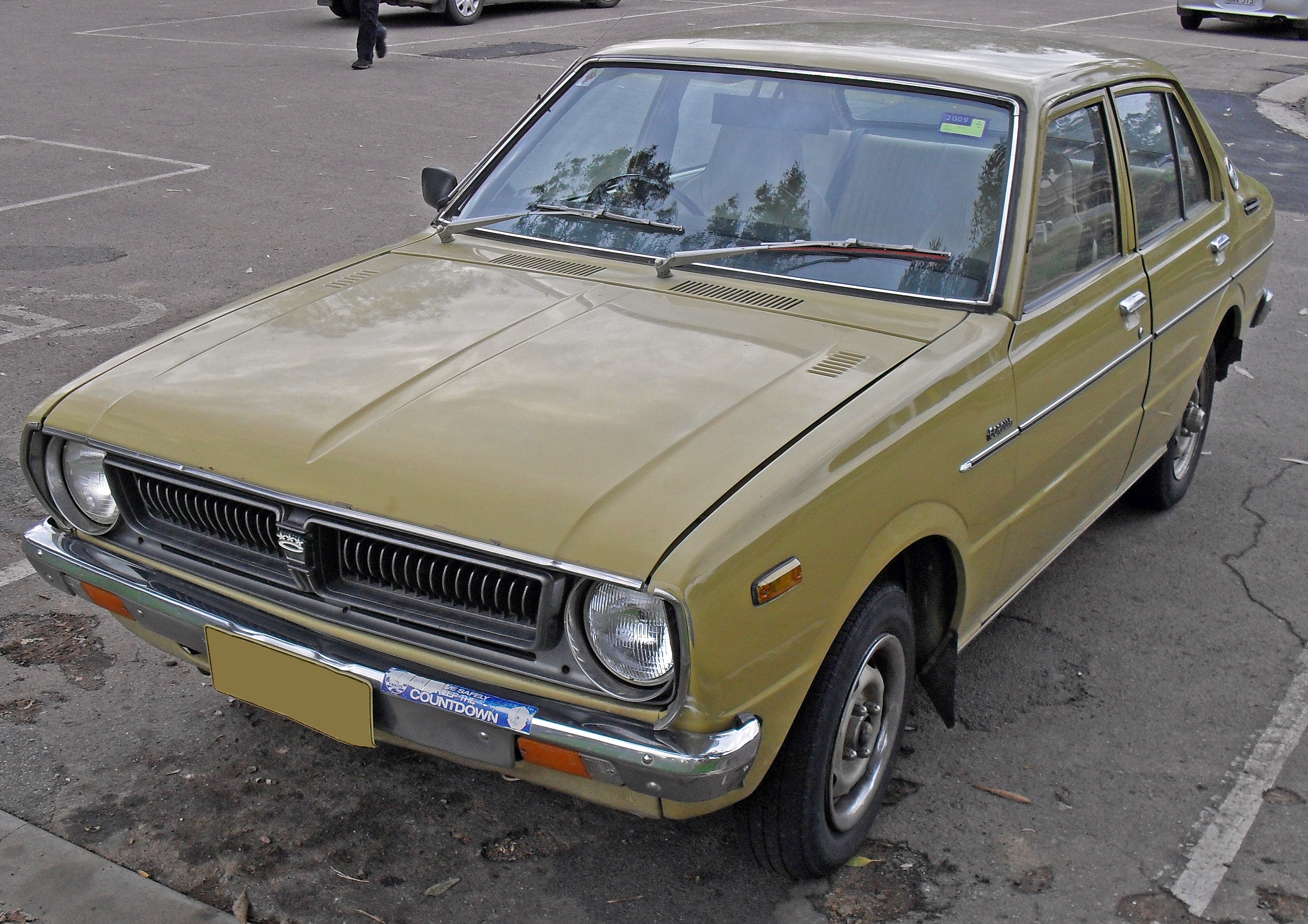
1976 Corolla (KE30R) CS sedan

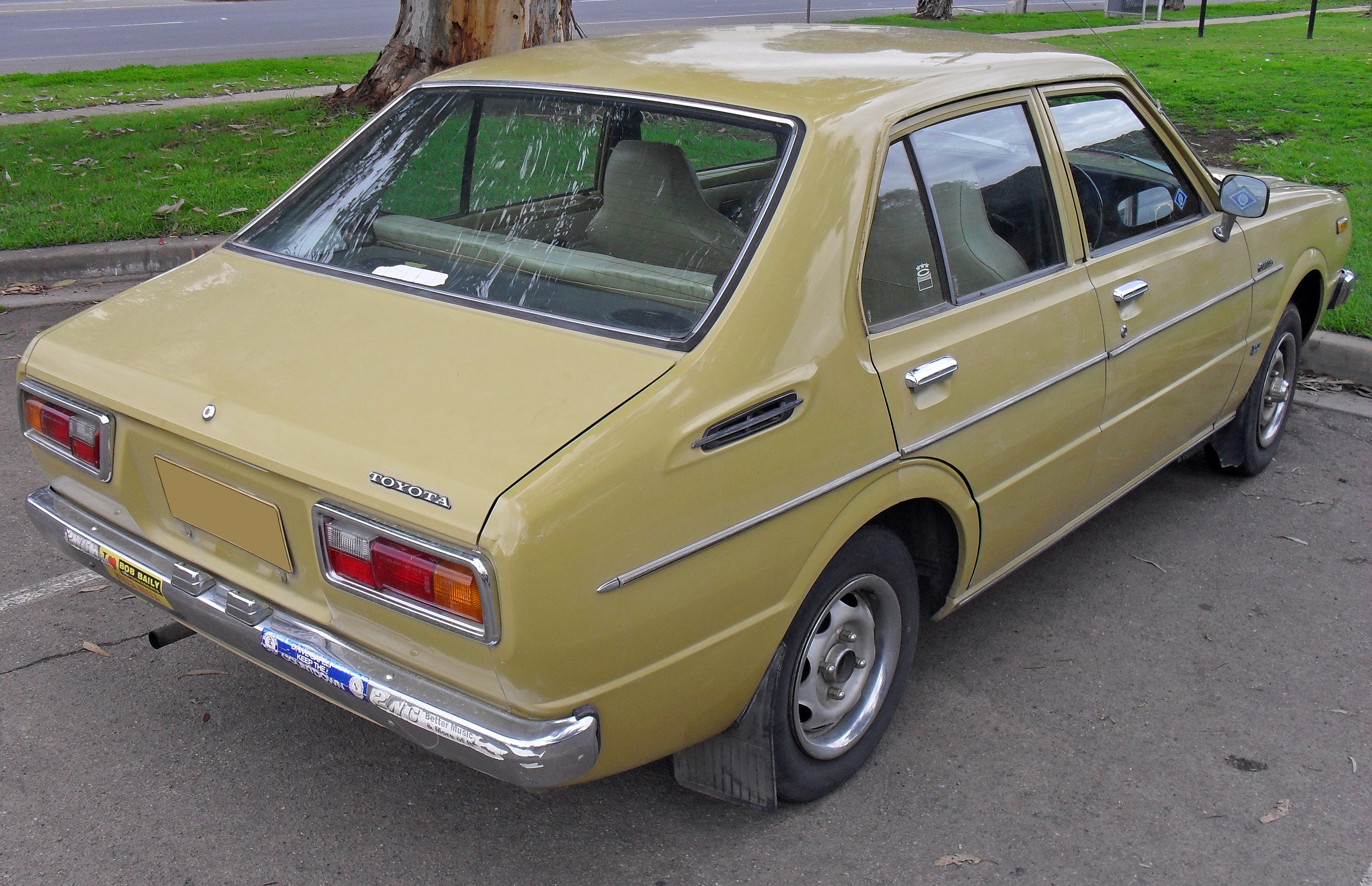
1976 Corolla (KE30R) CS sedan

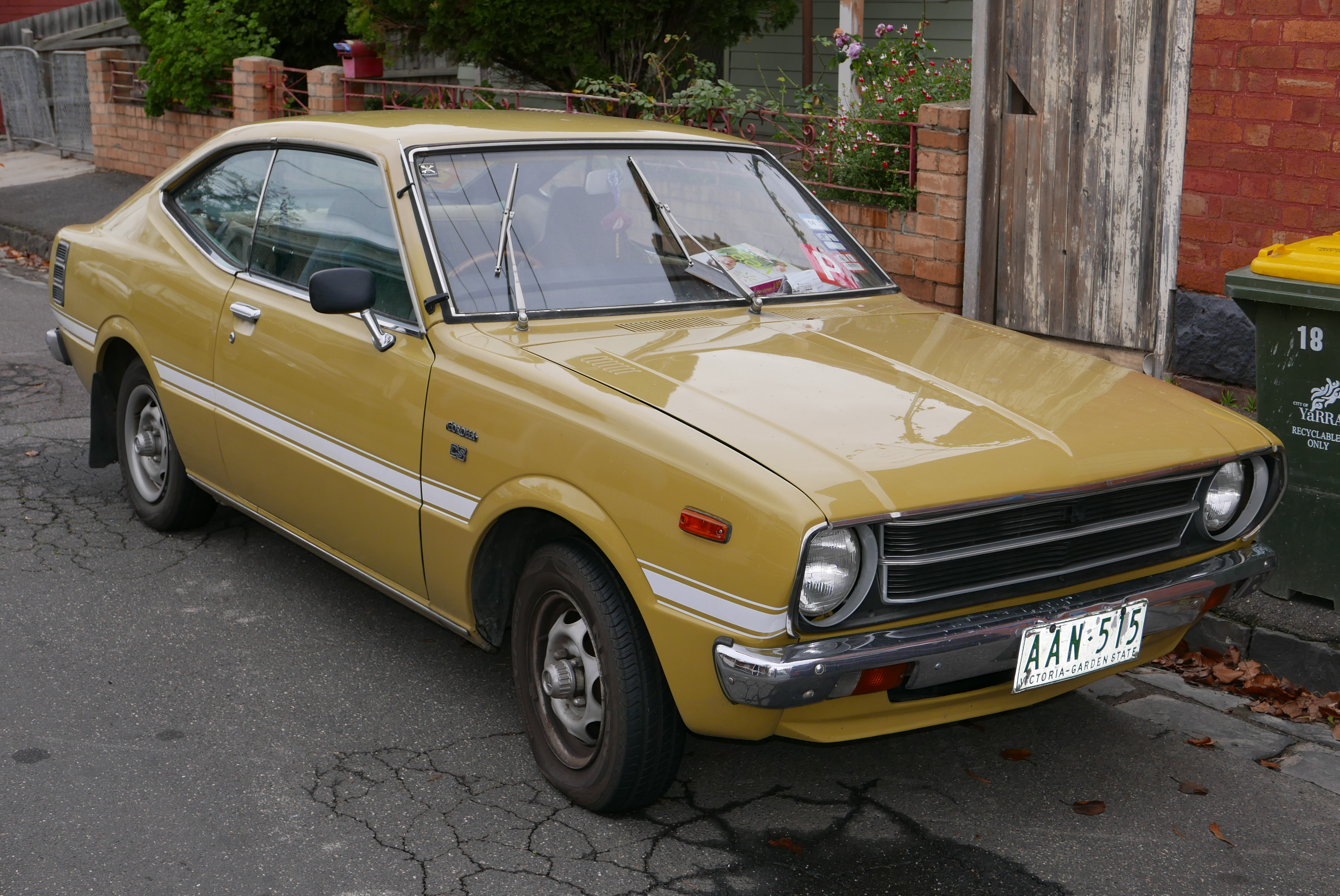
1976–1978 Toyota Corolla (KE35R) CS coupe

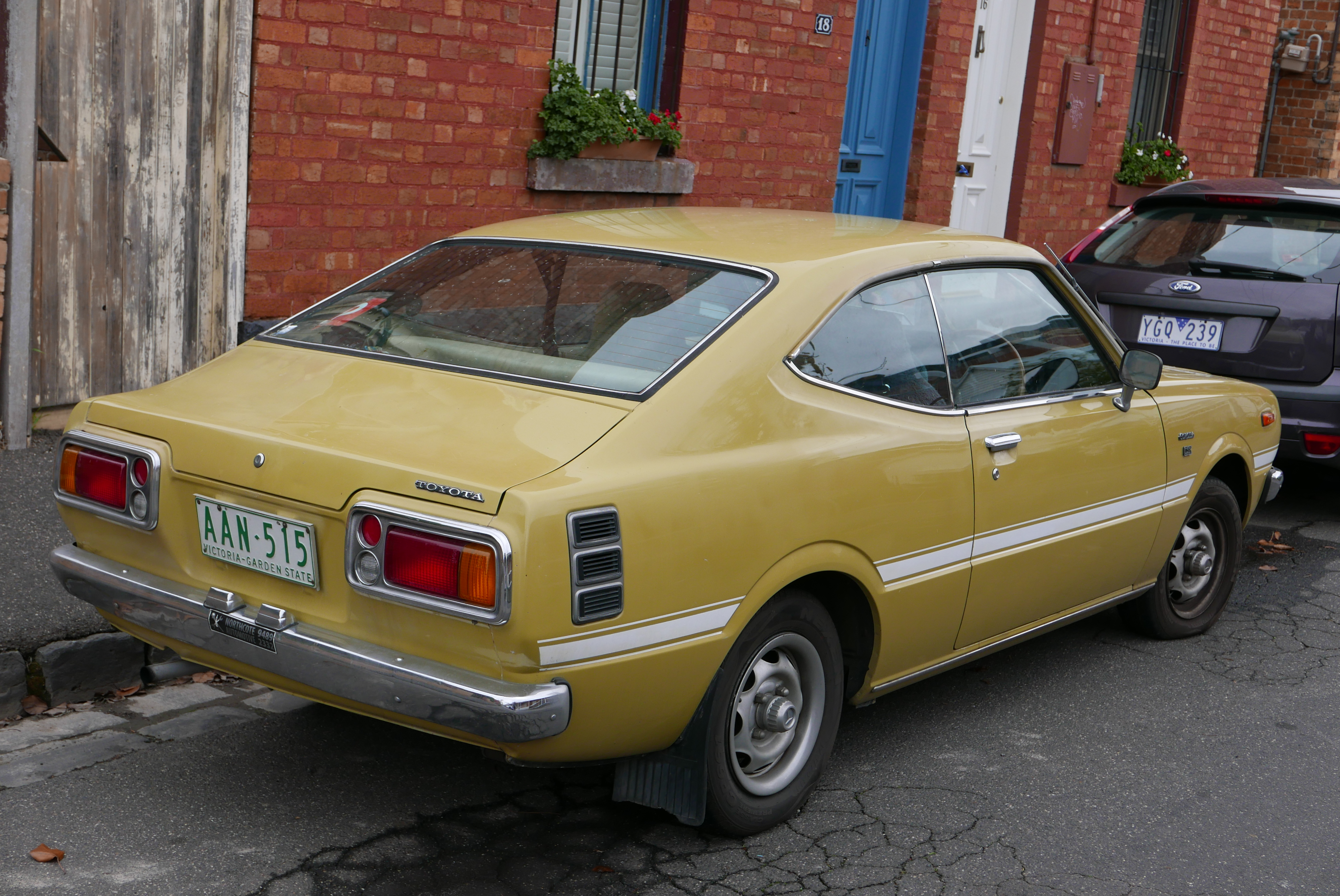
1976–1978 Toyota Corolla (KE35R) CS coupe

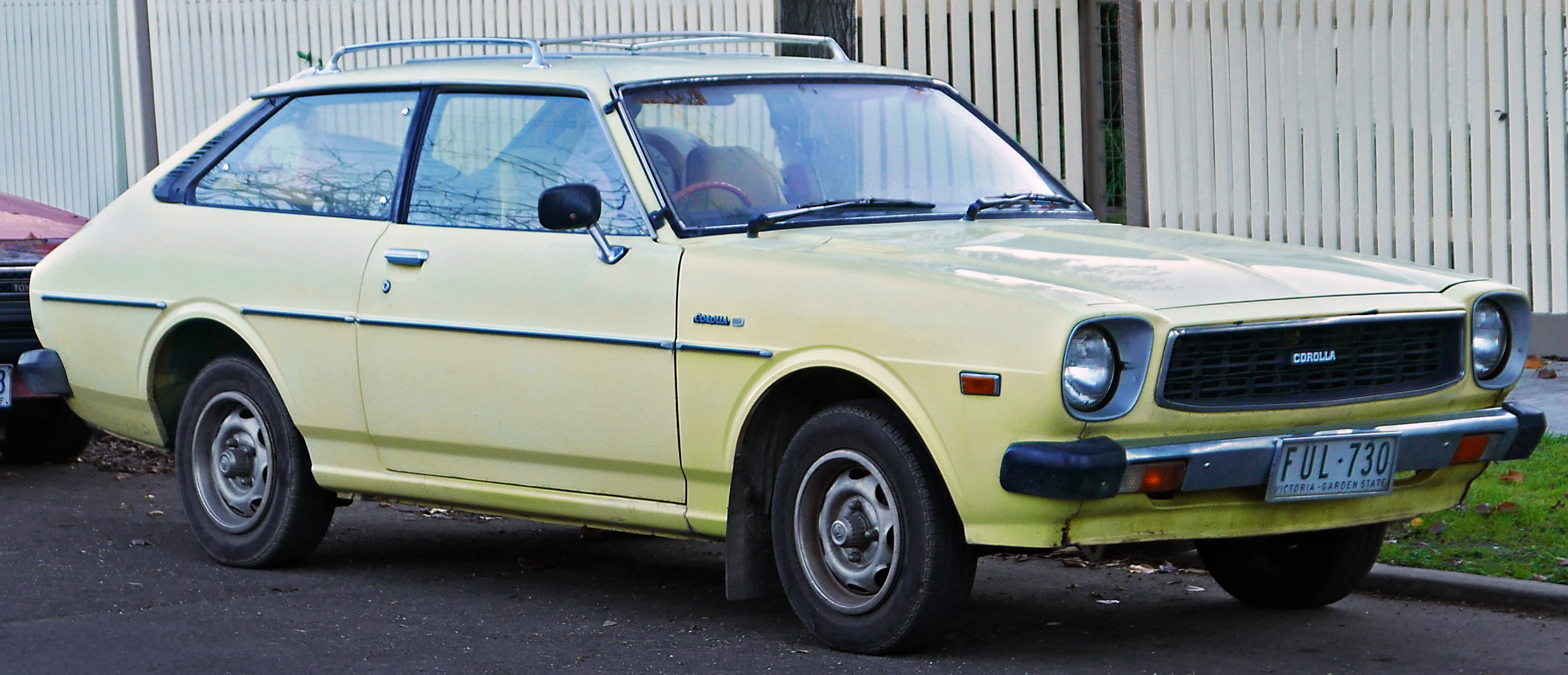
1977–1978 Toyota Corolla (KE50R) liftback

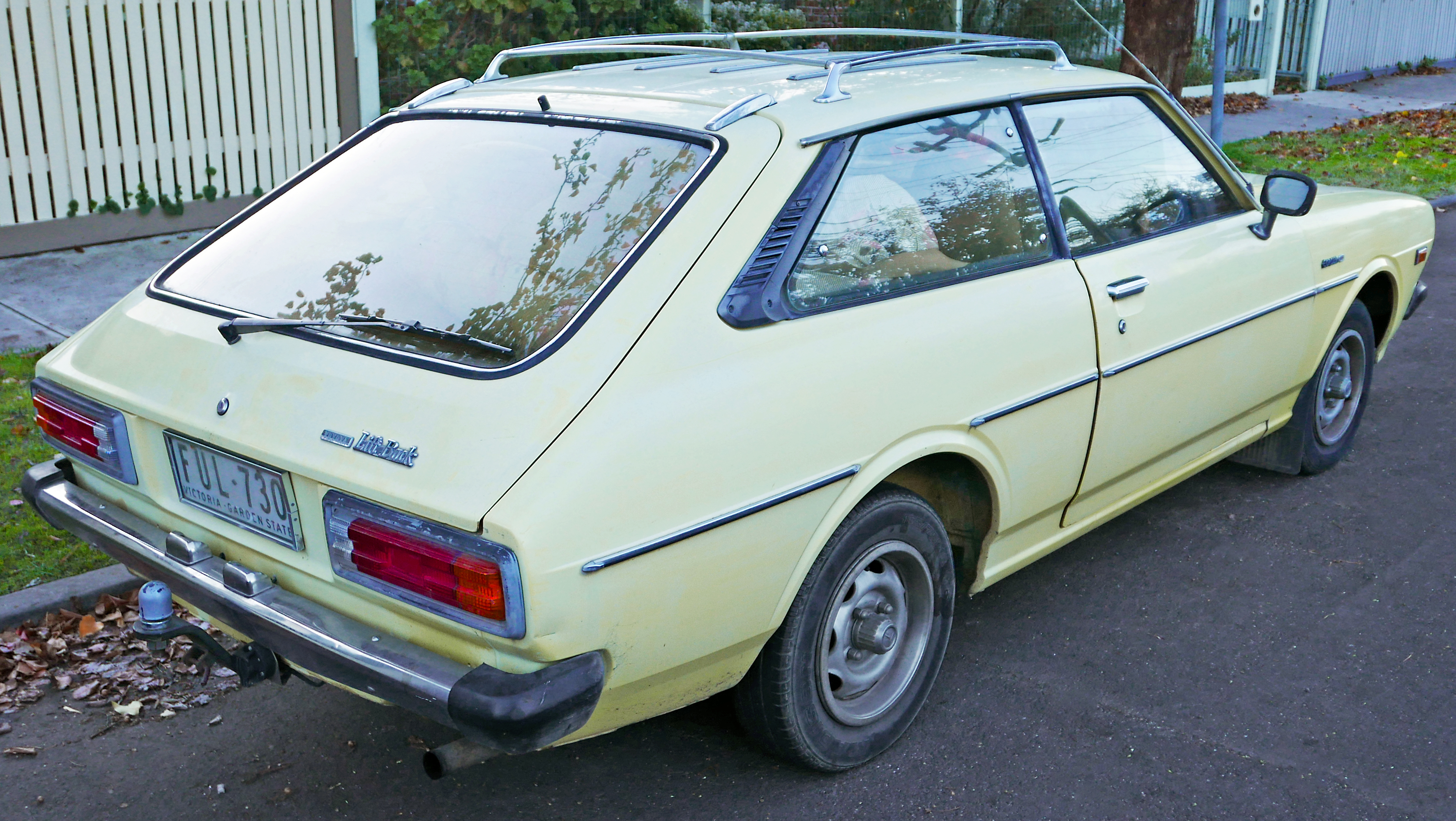
1977–1978 Toyota Corolla (KE50R) liftback

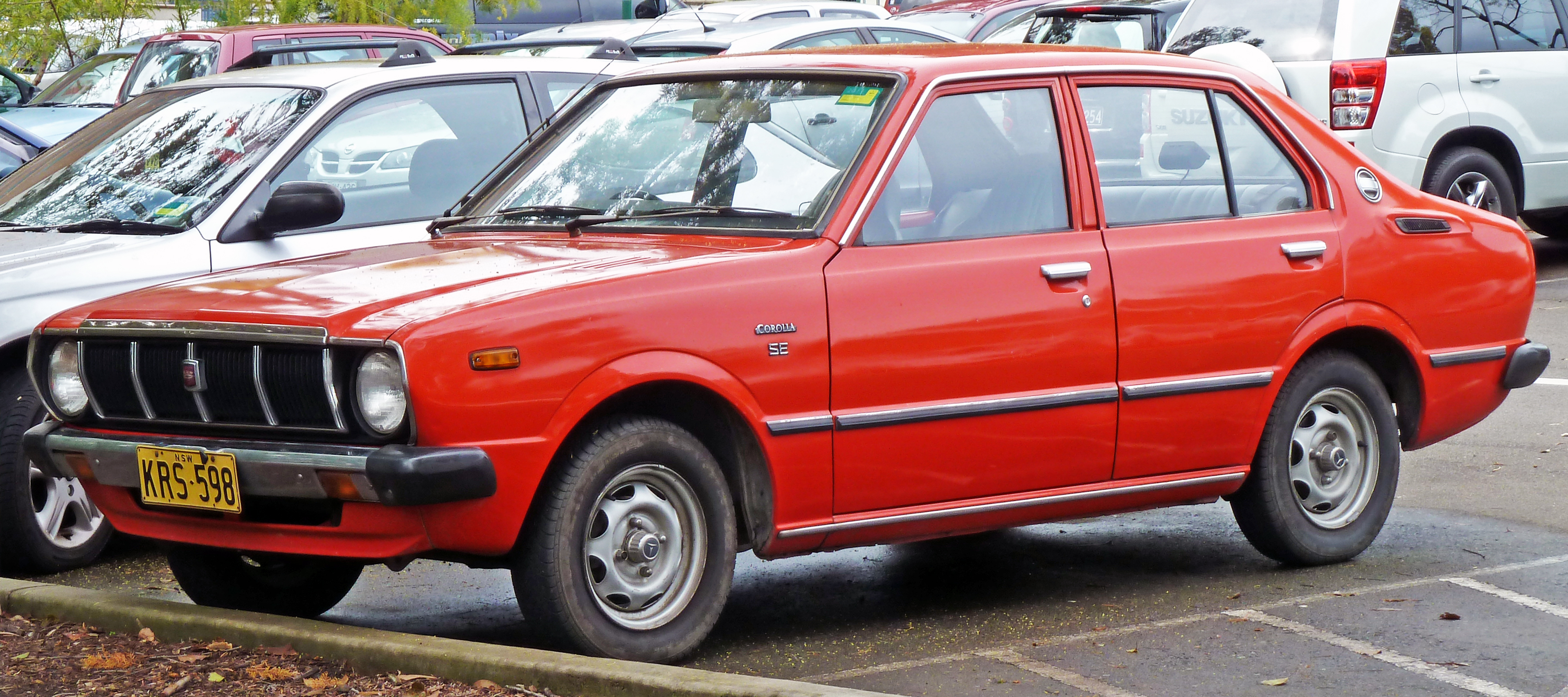
1978–1980 Corolla (KE55R) SE sedan

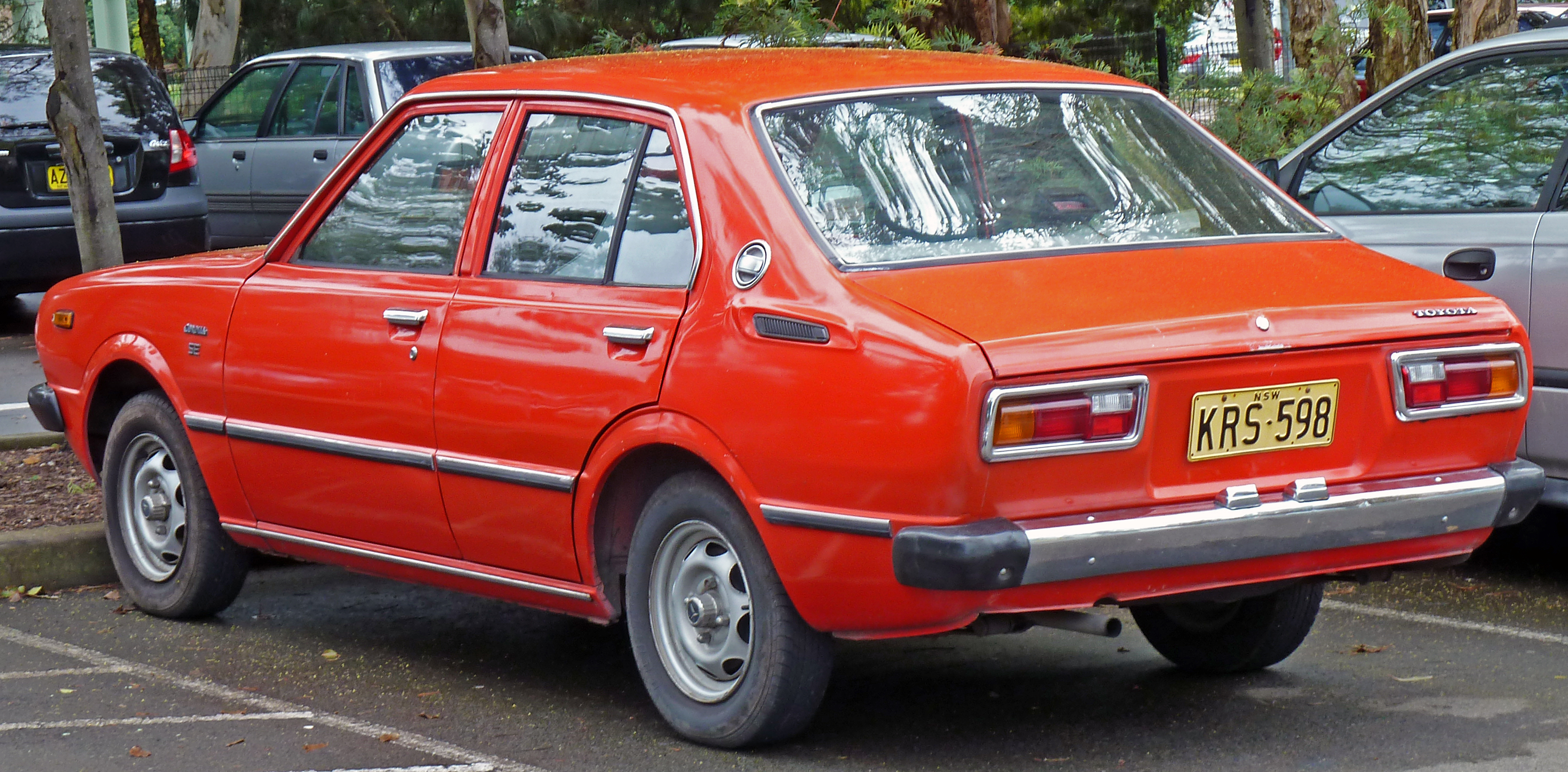
1978–1980 Corolla (KE55R) SE sedan

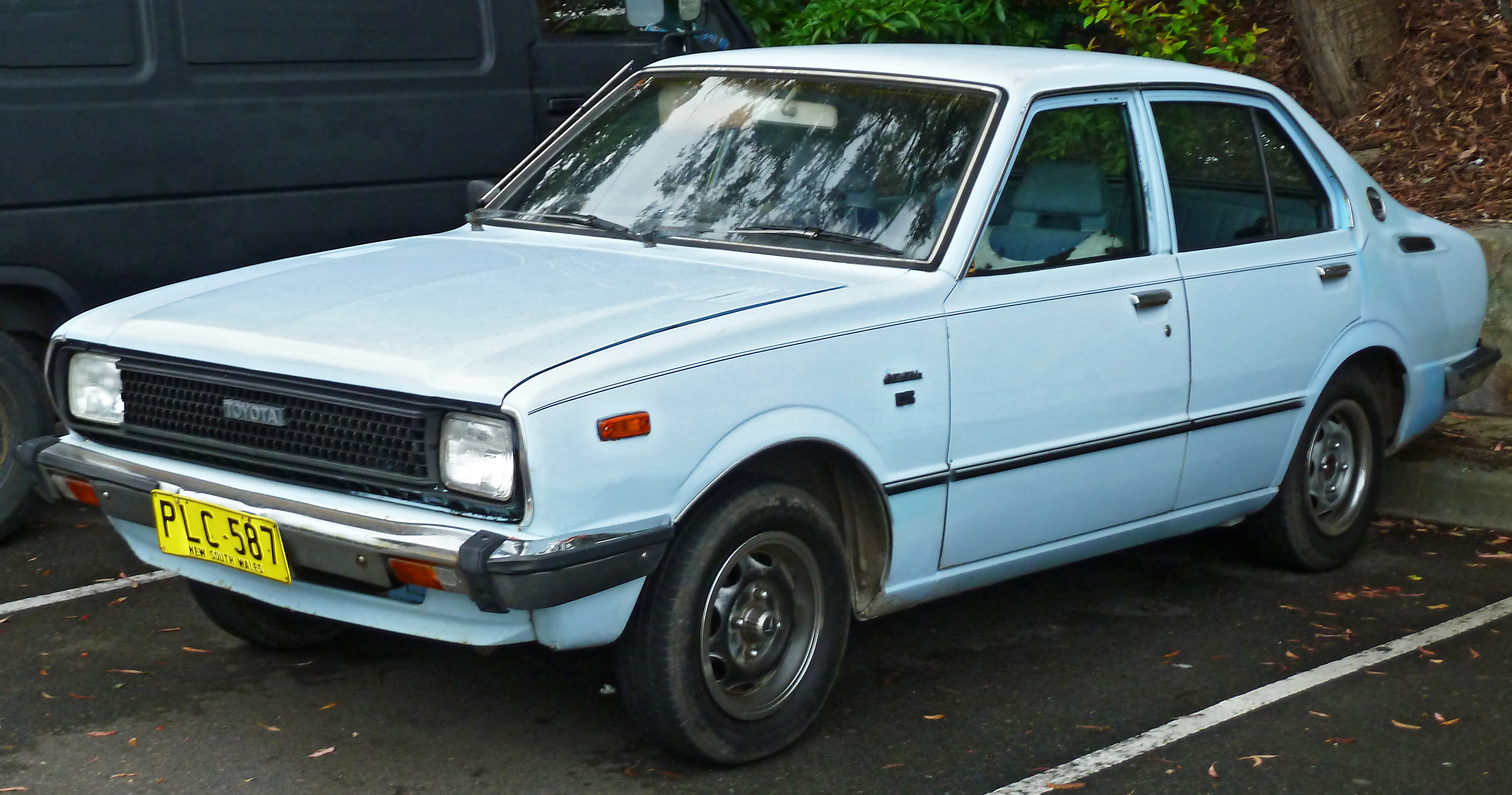
1980–1981 Corolla (KE55R) CS sedan

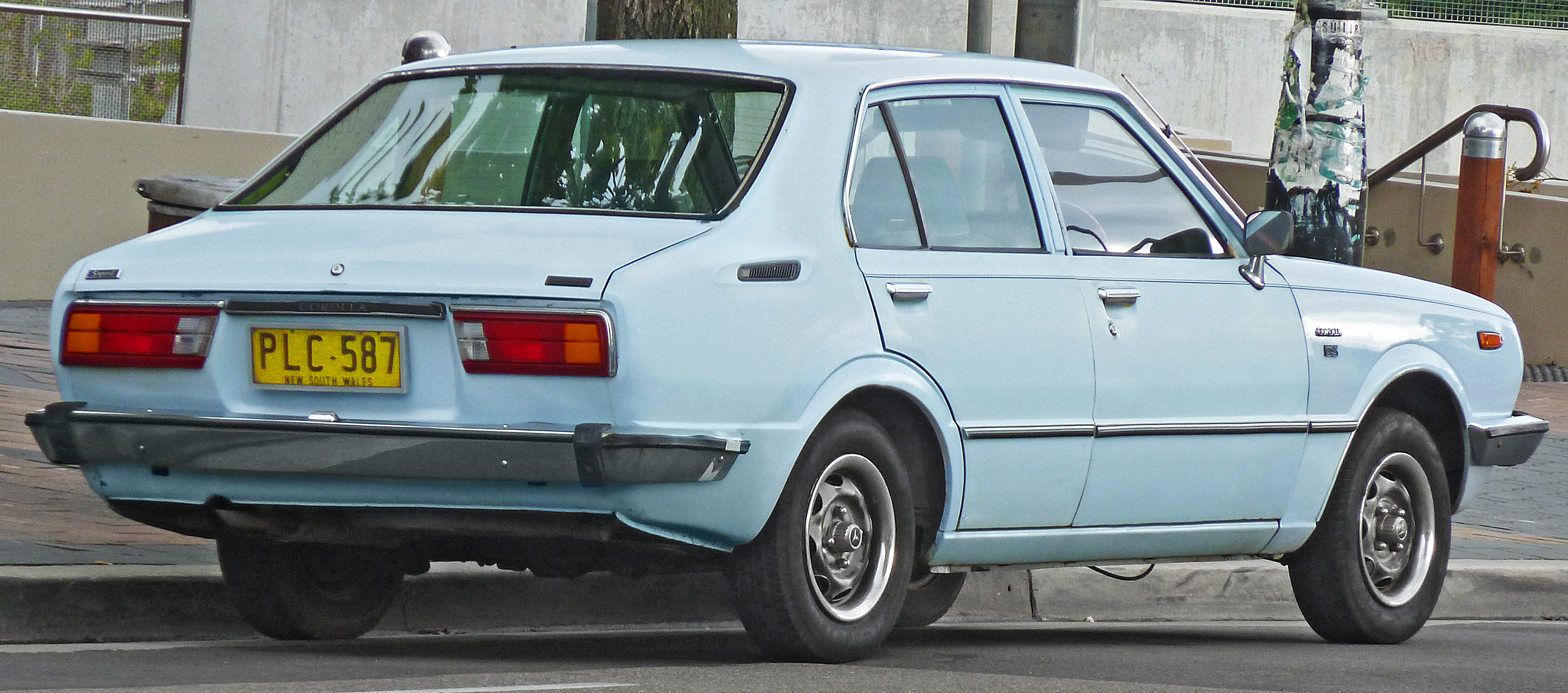
1980–1981 Corolla (KE55R) CS sedan

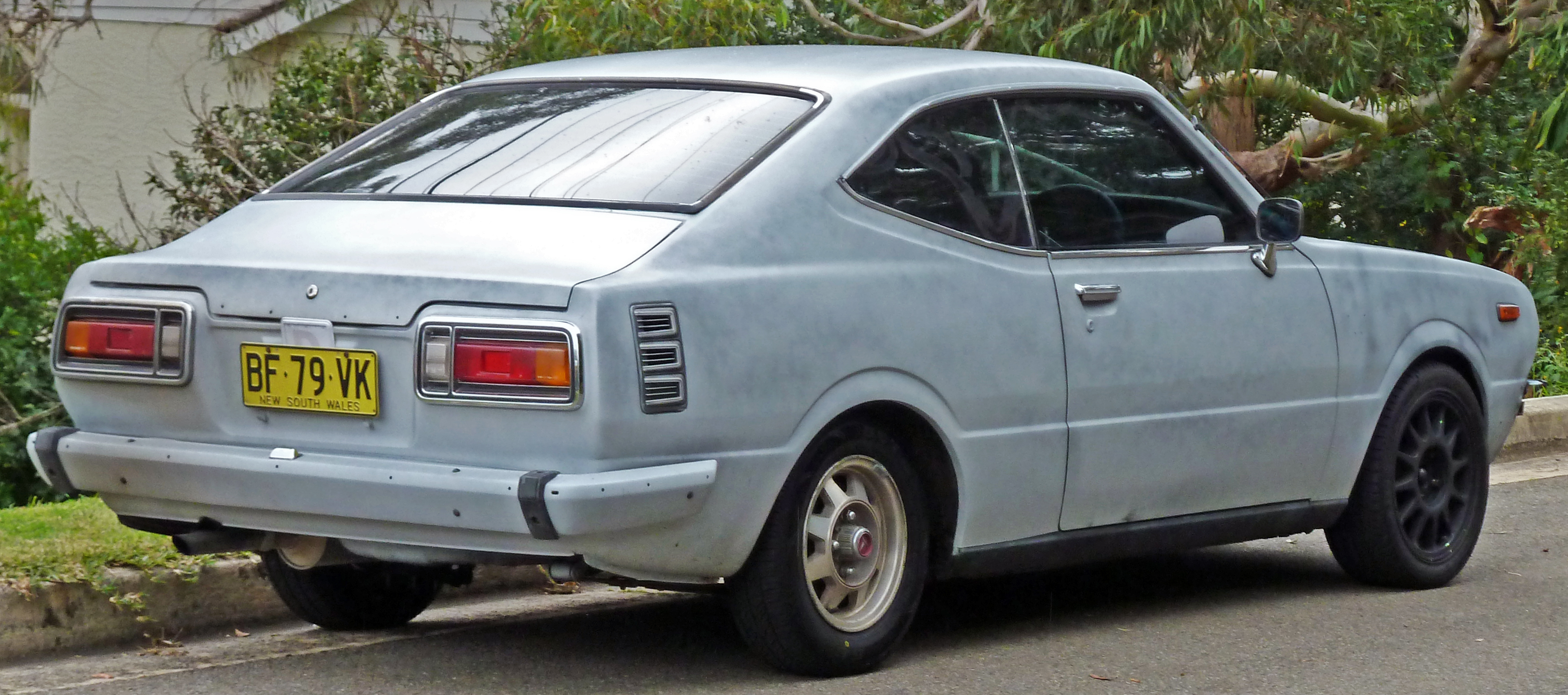
1980–1981 Corolla (KE55R) coupe

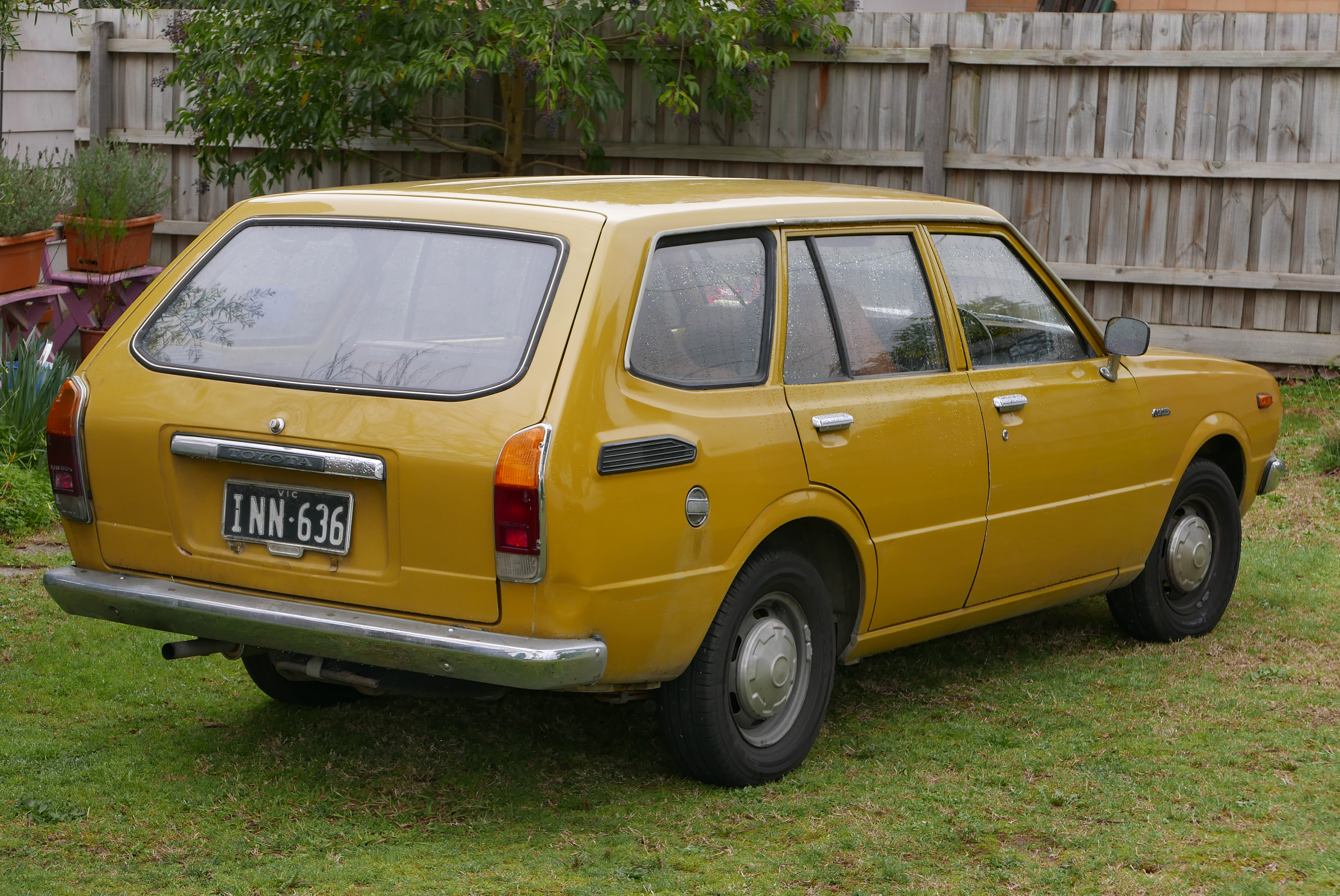
1976 Corolla (KE36RV) wagon
