= Alatac =

The Alatac was a Belgian automobile manufactured by Automobiles Catala of Braine-le-Comte from 1913 to 1914.

The company had its headquarters in the Rue de Tenbosch in Brussels and its manufacturing plants in Braine-le-Comte.

Two models were made, one being a 9/12CV and the other 12/16CV, both having four-cylinder, side-valve Chapuis-Dornier monobloc engines. They had a conventional Malicet & Blin chassis, a V-radiator, and detachable wire wheels.

Production ended in 1914 with the invasion of Belgium and the escalation of World War I.
