= Toyota P transmission =

The Toyota P transmission is a family of light/medium-duty transmissions made for Toyota cars. They use Porsche-type synchronizers.

== P51 ==
Ratios
First gear	3.525:1
Second gear	2.054:1
Third gear	1.396:1
Fourth gear	1.00:1
Fifth gear	0.859:1

=== Applications ===
- 1973-1981 Celica with 18R-G engine
- 1974-1981 Carina with 18R-G engine
- 1974-1981 Corona with 18R-G engine
- 1974-1981 Mark II / Cressida with 18R-G engine

== See also ==
- List of Toyota transmissions
- Toyota W transmission
- Toyota T transmission
