= The Old Marlborough Road =

1850 poem by Henry David Thoreau

"The Old Marlborough Road" is a poem written by transcendentalist philosopher Henry David Thoreau in 1850.

Thoreau lived near the disused Old Marlboro Road in Concord, Massachusetts, and frequently walked along it, which inspired him to write the poem. It first appeared as a journal entry in 1850; it was extensively revised before being incorporated into Walking, published posthumously in 1862.

== Historical background and composition ==
Henry David Thoreau composed "The Old Marlborough Road" in August 1850. The composition of the poem occurs during a period of Thoreau's career when he was walking and journaling extensively in the woods that surrounded his home in Concord, Massachusetts. Originating as a journal entry, the poem began as one of many observations Thoreau recorded during his daily excursions along the disused road that provided the inspiration for the poem's title. Between 1849 and 1852 Thoreau made frequent visits to the Old Marlborough Road, a once-traveled road that had effectively been abandoned by the mid-nineteenth century. His fascination with the particular landscape of the road was based in its disuse and abandonment, which rendered the road unserviceable for the commercial purposes for which it was originally built, having been replaced by newer and more efficient routes connecting Marlborough to neighboring towns.

Thoreau's composition of the poem reflects his philosophical and ideological interests during the period in which the poem was written. A transcendentalist, Thoreau was deeply interested in locating spiritual significance and meaning in the natural world and everyday landscapes. The Old Marlborough Road, decaying and largely unused, provided Thoreau with exactly the sort of overlooked and isolated natural space that fueled his transcendentalist philosophy. In a journal entry from September 19, 1850, Thoreau observed that the "Red stemmed Cornel" and other flowers growing alongside the road, which would later inform his poetic rendering of the place. On August 17, 1851, Thoreau noticed a wild apple tree by the road, which became symbolic of the natural reclamation of the road, wild vegetation growing precisely where society is absent.

The poem references a myriad of historical persons from Concord, Massachusetts and its surrounding areas. "Martial Miles" was a landowner who resided near the road. "Elijah Wood" was a prominent citizen of Concord, descending from one of Concord's founders. Wood's son, Elijah Wood Jr., was a contemporary of Thoreau. Scholars remain unsure why Thoreau refers to the elder Wood stating, "I fear for no good" within the text of the poem. "Elisha Dugan" was a free African-American residing in Concord, the son of a formerly enslaved person who had escaped and become a landowner. The history of the Dugan family is discussed in detail in Elise Lemire's Novel Black Walden. "The Irishman Quin" referenced in the text has been speculated to refer to the descendants of James Quin, who records say owned a house on the Old Marlborough Road.

The poem was later heavily revised before being posthumously published in Walking, which was published in 1862, over a decade after its initial composition. The integration of the poem into the larger essay gave the poem additional meaning in relation to the content of Walking, which is focused on the act of walking itself, American identity, and wildness.

Interestingly located within his essay, Walking, some scholars suggest that "The Old Marlborough Road" is connected to the style and forms of the British Romantic literary tradition from which Thoreau drew a great deal of inspiration for his transcendentalist philosophy. The poem is primarily composed of short lines of dimeter and trimeter, making heavy of use of rhyming couplets and slant rhymes. Scholars have observed that this serves as an example of Thoreau's stylistic preference for short lines, abrupt line endings, and metrical irregularity.

Thoreau makes use of wordplay throughout the poem, notably in his invocation of "Martial Miles" (a real historical figure), whose name also suggest a play on "marshal" or a military march, whom the text depicts as "singly filing".

== Text and analysis ==
Where they once dug for money,
But never found any;
Where sometimes Martial Miles
Singly files,
And Elijah Wood,
I fear for no good:
No other man,
Save Elisha Dugan --
O man of wild habits,
Partridges and rabbits
Who hast no cares
Only to set snares,
Who liv'st all alone,
Close to the bone
And where life is sweetest
Constantly eatest.
When the spring stirs my blood
With the instinct to travel,
I can get enough gravel
On the Old Marlborough Road.
Nobody repairs it,
For nobody wears it;
It is a living way,
As the Christians say.
Not many there be
Who enter therein,
Only the guests of the
Irishman Quin.
What is it, what is it
But a direction out there,
And the bare possibility
Of going somewhere?
Great guide-boards of stone,
But travelers none;
Cenotaphs of the towns
Named on their crowns.
It is worth going to see
Where you might be.
What king
Did the thing,
I am still wondering;
Set up how or when,
By what selectmen,
Gourgas or Lee,
Clark or Darby?
They're a great endeavor
To be something forever;
Blank tablets of stone,
Where a traveler might groan,
And in one sentence
Grave all that is known
Which another might read,
In his extreme need.
I know one or two
Lines that would do,
Literature that might stand
All over the land
Which a man could remember
Till next December,
And read again in the spring,
After the thawing.
If with fancy unfurled
You leave your abode,
You may go round the world
By the Old Marlborough Road.

== Critical response ==
Some scholars suggest that Thoreau has been overlooked by critics as a result of his unorthodox poetic style which, while taking inspiration from British Romantics such as William Wordsworth, ultimately deviates from the popular style of both Thoreau's American and British 19th-century contemporaries. Thoreau's poetry has been observed to be rough, and at times unpolished, a fact which is sometimes attributed to his choice to focus on prose writing, particularly towards the end of his life and career. However, scholars note that Thoreau's poetry seems to anticipate poetic trends of the 20th century, espousing complexity, symbolism, and inconsistency rather than the poetic styles of the 19th century. Critics and scholars taking this point of view read Thoreau's poetry as something entirely new, borrowing from previous poets and traditions in order to create his own unique mode of expression.
