= Marlboro (disambiguation) =

Marlboro is an American brand of cigarettes owned by Philip Morris USA.

Marlboro may also refer to the name of various geographical locations, frequently named after the town of Marlborough in Wiltshire, England:

== Places ==
=== United States ===
Alphabetical by state

- Marlboro, Burlington County, New Jersey
- Marlboro (CDP), New Jersey, in Cumberland County
- Marlboro Township, New Jersey, in Monmouth County
- Marlboro, New York
  - Marlboro Mountains, a group of hogbacked mountains in New York
- Marlboro, Ohio
- Marlboro Township, Delaware County, Ohio
- Marlboro Township, Stark County, Ohio
- Marlboro County, South Carolina
- Marlboro, Vermont
  - Marlboro College
  - Marlboro Music School and Festival, an annual summer retreat
- Marlboro, Virginia
- Upper Marlboro, Maryland

=== Other countries ===
- Marlboro, Alberta, Canada
- Marlboro, Gauteng, a suburb of Sandton in South Africa
  - Marlboro (Gautrain station), a rapid transit station

== People ==
- DJ Marlboro, Brazilian DJ
- Marlboro Jones, American slave
- Marlboro Packard (1828–1904), master shipbuilder

== Other uses ==
- Marlboro College, located in Marlboro, Vermont
- Marlboro Colored High School in Upper Marlboro, Maryland
- Marlboro Man, a figure used in advertising campaigns for Marlboro cigarettes
- Toronto Marlboros, a minor league hockey team located in Toronto, Ontario, Canada from 1904–1989

== See also ==
- Marlborough (disambiguation)
