= Malicet et Blin =

French automobile manufacturer

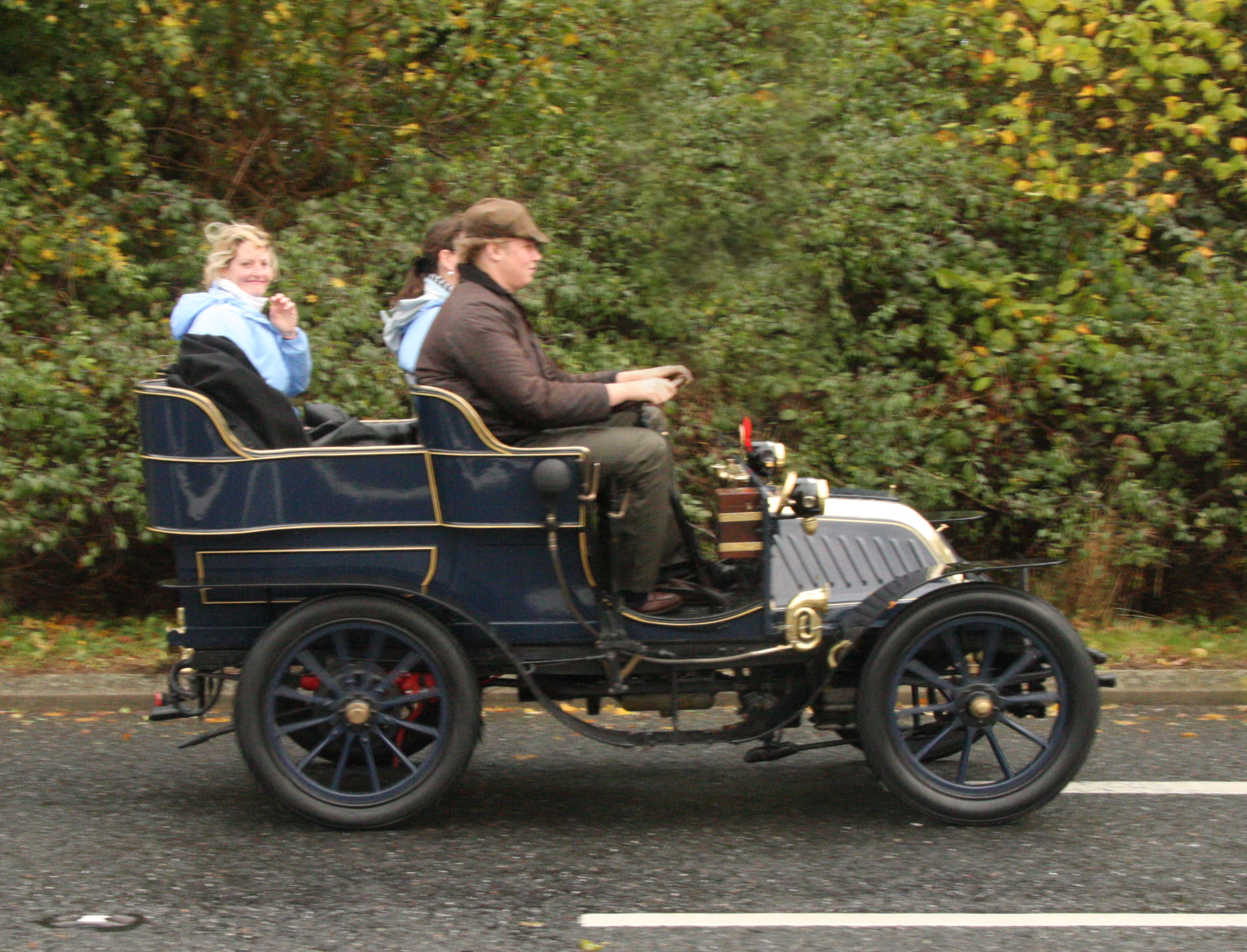
1903 Malicet & Blin on the London to Brighton Veteran Car Run in 2009

Malicet & Blin (M.A.B.) was a French manufacturer of bicycles, automobiles, auto components, and aeronautical engines from 1890 until 1925. It expanded into the motor industry in 1897 and aero engines in 1914. They produced both incomplete and entire cars for the UK market, which were badged as Marlborough.

== History ==
Paul Malicet and Eugène Blin founded the company in 1890 to manufacture bicycles in the north east Paris suburb of Aubervilliers. By 1897 they had increased their range to include motor car accessories and components such as chassis and steering gear, where they became one of the leaders in France. By 1903 they produced complete cars which were badged Malicet & Blin, but production was limited. The business continued until 1925, supplying components to other car manufacturers under the name MAB.

Paul Malicet died in October 1923.

== Cycles ==
In 1893 Malicet et Blin filed a patent application (Brevet), number 230674, for a captive ball-bearing race for bicycle gears. This was marketed as Regina. system, and lead to the company becoming a specialist supplier to other manufacturers. This business was acquired by SKF in 1967.

The company was awarded a silver medal at the Paris Cycle Exposition in September 1900.

== Cars ==
In 1897 they produced a Vis-à-vis (face to face) four seater with a 4 cv (horsepower) engine.

Later the range included 4 CV (horsepower), 6 CV and 8 CV models powered by a single cylinder engine.

An 1897 4 hp Vis-à-vis and a 1903 Tonneau with a 6 hp De Dion-Bouton engine occasionally perform in the London to Brighton Veteran Car Run in England.

== Accessories and components ==
In 1893 Malicet et Blin filed a patent application (Brevet), number 230674, for a captive ball-bearing race for bicycle gears. This was marketed as the Regina. system, and lead to the company becoming a specialist supplier to other manufacturers. This business was acquired by SKF in 1967.

Malicet & Blin variously supplied components, chassis and complete cars to: Alatac, Bridgwater Motor Company (aka CCC), Ernst, Excelsior, Eysink, Garage Moderne, Ivor, La Torpille, Lucerna, Marlborough, Mutel, Sigma, and Tuar.

== War production ==
=== Armaments ===
The factory, with over 500 employees, manufactured artillery shell warheads during World War I.

=== Aircraft engines ===
In 1914 Eugene Blin and Pierre Clerget also became involved in building aircraft engines at the factory. They manufactured engines for the Sopwith 1½ Strutter, bombers, and the seaplane fighter of Louis Schreck's Franco-British Aviation.
