= Old Marlboro Road =

Historic road in Massachusetts, United States

Old Marlboro Road, also spelt Old Marlborough Road, is a historic road in Massachusetts, United States. Today it runs through Concord, Sudbury, and Maynard, Massachusetts.

"The Old Marlborough Road" is a poem about the road by Henry David Thoreau, published in his work, Walking.

== History ==
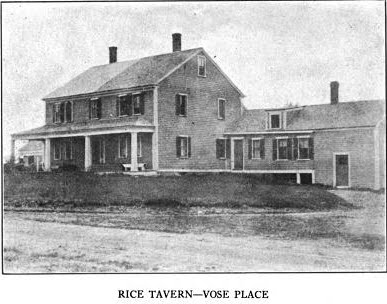
Rice Tavern

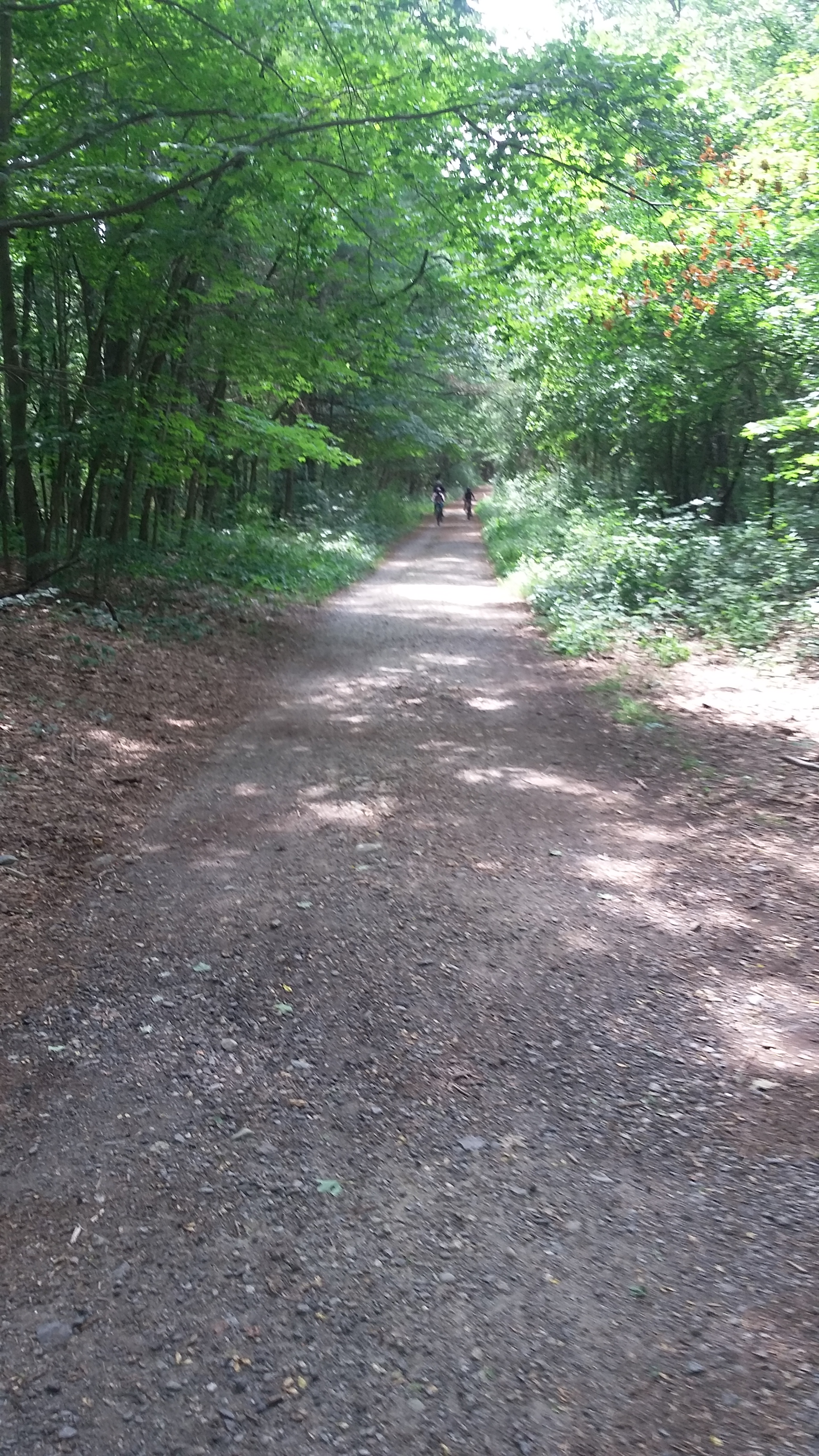
Winterberry Way near the Old Marlboro Road entrance to Assabet River National Wildlife Refuge in Maynard

The road likely originated as an Indian path, being the "shortest course through the domain of Tantamous (Maynard) to Occogoogansett (Marlboro)."

Colonists settled along the road in the seventeenth century. During the Revolutionary War, ammunition wagons traveled along Old Marlboro/Concord Road to provide George Washington arms for his defense of Trenton. Rice Tavern existed from 1685 to 1815 at the crossing of the Concord-Marlborough and Sudbury-Lancaster roads. It was run for many years by Jonathan Rice. Only some foundations remain.

In the nineteenth century, Transcendentalist Thoreau] lived near the disused road in Concord, and frequently walked along it, before writing a poem entitled "The Old Marlborough Road."

== Today ==
Parts of the route exist as road anew, from Concord, near Emerson Hospital, into Sudbury and then Maynard, where it terminates at the Assabet River National Wildlife Refuge. The route continues in the Refuge as Winterberry Way and Powerline Trail. Beyond the Refuge, the route continues as roads by various names, ending as Concord Road in Marlborough.
