= The Marlborough =

- U.S. National Register of Historic Places
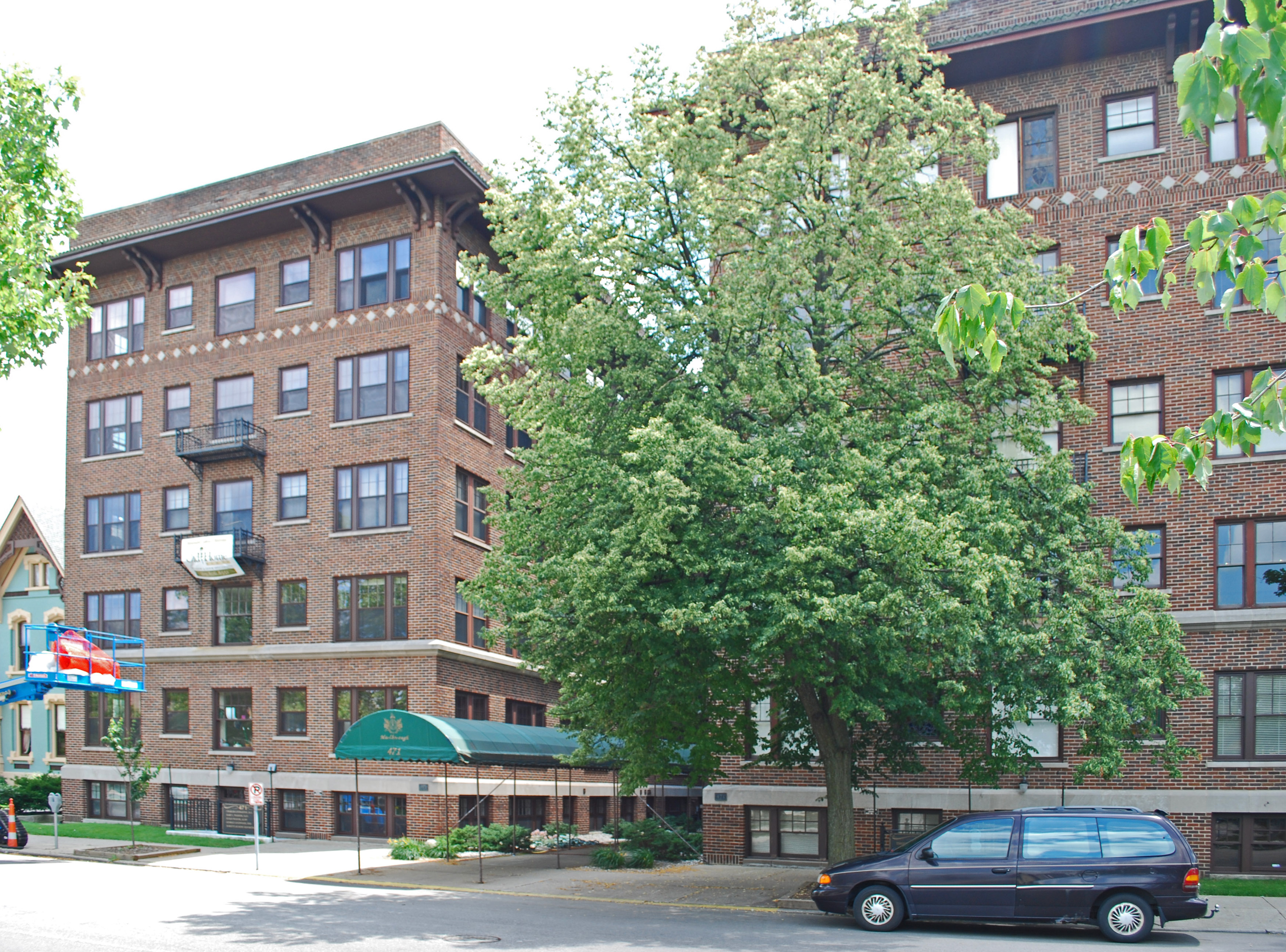

- Location within Michigan Location within the United States
- Interactive map
- Location: 471 W. South St., Kalamazoo, Michigan
- Coordinates: 42°17′22″N 85°35′21″W
- Area: 1 acre (0.40 ha)
- Built: 1923
- Built by: Henry L. Vanderhorst
- Architect: Billingham & Cobb
- MPS: Kalamazoo MRA
- NRHP reference No.: 83000863
- Added to NRHP: May 27, 1983

The Marlborough is a condominium building located at 471 West South Street in Kalamazoo, Michigan. It was listed on the National Register of Historic Places in 1983.

== History ==
Planning for the Marlborough lasted several years, with local architectural firm Billingham & Cobb drawing up the plans. Construction started in 1923, inder the supervision of contractor Henry L. Vanderhorst, and lasted until 1924. The building reportedly cost over a quarter of a million dollars to construct; when it opened, it was the city's finest and most luxurious apartment building, with utilities, ice, telephone, laundry, maid, and janitor services included in the rent. The Marlborough was converted into condominiums in the late 1970s.

== Description ==
The Marlborough is a six-story, H-shaped, brown brick apartment building. The first floor of the building contains office space, with the upper floors devoted to housing. The building has Mediterranean bracketing and tile work at the roofline. The entranceway is recessed in the center of the H, and surrounded with delicate colored glass windows. A small courtyard on one side of the structure visually complements the building.
