= Toyota T transmission =

Toyota transmission family

Toyota Motor Corporation's T family is a family of 4/5/6-speed light/medium-duty transmissions found in Toyota cars.

== T40 ==
Ratios:

- First Gear: 3.587:1
- Second Gear: 2.022:1
- Third Gear: 1.384:1
- Fourth Gear: 1.00:1

Applications:

- 1982 Corona with 3A engine
- 1983 Corona with 1S/3T-E engine
- -1981 TA40, 1983 Carina with 3A/2T engine
- 1983 Celica with 1S engine
- 1975-1979 Corolla with 2TC engine (shorter shifter in tail shaft in this version)
- 1980-1982 Corolla with 3TC engine
- 1983-1984 Corolla Panel Van with 4AC engine
- KA67 Carina Station Wagon with 5K engine (22 spline) K bell housing with hydraulic clutch.

== T50 ==
Ratios:

- First Gear: 3.587:1
- Second Gear: 2.022:1
- Third Gear: 1.384:1
- Fourth Gear: 1.00:1
- Fifth Gear: 0.861:1

Applications:

- 1982-1983 Carina with AA60 - 3A. /1S/3T-E/2T engine
- 1982 Corona with 1S engine
- 1983 Celica with 3T-E/2T-E engine
- 1984 Corolla with 2A engine
- 1980-1982 Corolla with 3TC engine
- 1983-1987 Corolla with 4AC/ 4AGEU/ 3AU/ 4AU engine
- 1975-1979 Corolla with 2TC/2TGEU engine (shorter shifter on tail shaft in this version)

Notes:

- Comes in two varieties: 20 and 22-splines on the output shaft.
- There are several aftermarket companies, like Toyota Racing Development (TRD) and Quaife, who sell different gears for the T50 transmission.

TRD package #1 ratios:

- First Gear: 2.630:1
- Second Gear: 1.891:1
- Third Gear: 1.384:1
- Fourth Gear: 1.00:1
- Fifth Gear: 0.861:1

TRD package #2 ratios:

- First Gear: 2.341:1
- Second Gear: 1.607:1
- Third Gear: 1.195:1
- Fourth Gear: 1.00:1
- Fifth Gear: 0.886:1

Quaife ratios:

- First Gear: 2.347:1
- Second Gear: 1.733:1
- Third Gear: 1.379:1
- Fourth Gear: 1.144:1
- Fifth Gear: 1.00:1

TecArt's N2-1 ratios:

- First Gear: 2.341:1
- Second Gear: 1.607:1
- Third Gear: 1.383:1
- Fourth Gear: 1.000:1
- Fifth Gear: 1.196:1 (3.5-speed)

BattleGarage/MFactory

- Fifth Gear: 0.737:1

== TLxx ==
=== TL70 ===
Longitudinal 6 Speed Transmission

1st	2nd	3rd	4th	5th	6th	Reverse
3.626	2.188	1.541	1.213	1.000	0.767	3.437

Applications (calendar years):

- 2012- Scion FR-S/Subaru BRZ/Toyota 86/Toyota GR86

== See also ==
- Toyota P transmission
