= Marlborough (Anglo-French car) =

The Marlborough was a make of car sold on the British market between 1906 and 1926. For most of its life the cars were made by Malicet et Blin in France, but after World War I they were partially assembled (finished) in London and an increasing number of British parts used.

== History ==
The first cars were probably supplied completely built by the French company Malicet et Blin, but over time the British content increased such that the final 2 litre car was made completely in England. (Note: Some sources cast doubt over whether complete cars were ever imported, or whether French components were assembled in a workshop in Notting Hill, London. (Baldwin, N. (1994). A-Z of Cars of the 1920s. Devon, UK: Bay View Books. ISBN 1-870979-53-2.))

Malicet & Blin were established suppliers to the French automobile industry, including engines, gearboxes and chassis.

In 1909 T.B. André, owner of Hartford Friction disk shock absorbers, took control of the dealership, and introduced a new range of larger cars with engines ranging in size between 2210 cc and 3617 cc.

Although the company survived World War 1, they did not introduce a new model until 1922 when they used a British Anzani engine. This model was short-lived and was superseded by a French CIME powered car which continued in production until the company's demise in 1926. By 1924 T.B. Andre put his main sporting efforts into the Marlborough-Thomas which was built at Brooklands in partnership with J. G. Parry-Thomas.

== The cars ==
In 1906 the first model was introduced in Britain, when C.C.C. of Taunton (Chassis Construction Company) exhibited at the London Agricultural Hall Motor Show. It was a 7 hp single-cylinder-engined car.

In 1909 a new range of larger cars was introduced by T.B. André with engines ranging in size between 2210 cc and 3617 cc. The 12 hp model was priced at £120 and had a 2.8-litre four-cylinder engine with the cylinders cast in pairs, magneto ignition, a cone clutch driving the 3-speed gearbox, with shaft drive to the rear wheels. The range included a 3.1-litre model with four cylinders, plus a 3.6-litre six-cylinder model which was priced at £350. This range was marketed until 1911.

In 1912 the company introduced one of the first cyclecars which was priced at £185 and was mostly French built. It had a 1130 cc four-cylinder, water-cooled engine, a sharp V-shaped radiator and shaft drive to the rear wheels. Its sporting potential was demonstrated when it was driven in the Cyclecar Grand Prix by Sir Francis Samuelson. The electrically equipped version with a 1.2-litre engine was priced at £275. This model was marketed again after World War I, although the specification also included rounded radiator, increased engine capacity (100cc) and four-speed gearbox.

In 1921 the pre-war light car was replaced by a 1496 cc British Anzani engined model which was equipped with rod brakes and a flat radiator. This model was replaced one year later. The Roadspeed sports version was guaranteed to exceed 60 mph.

In 1922 a smaller light car was launched with a French 1100 cc C.I.M.E. engine. By 1924 this was priced at £175. This stayed in production until the company closed in 1926.

The last model never reached customer production, but it was a British made sports car capable of 75 mph and fitted with four-wheel braking. It was equipped with a 2-litre, six-cylinder, overhead-valve Coventry Climax engine.

== T.B. André ==
Theodore Bernard André, from Essex, took over the UK dealership in 1909. He was also involved in the manufacture of Silentbloc rubber bushed bearings; Hartford shock absorbers; Len Brake Co brake shoes; the Marlborough-Thomas from 1923 to 1924; plus the André car between 1933 and 1934.

== See also ==
- List of car manufacturers of the United Kingdom
