= Marlborough School, Woodstock =

The Marlborough C of E School

Location
- Shipton Road; Woodstock, Oxfordshire, OX20 1LP; England; 51.8491°N 1.3411°W

Information
- Type: Academy
- Religious affiliation: Church of England
- Established: 1939
- Local authority: Oxfordshire County Council
- Trust: River Learning Trust
- Department for Education URN: 138817 Tables
- Ofsted: Reports
- Principal: Andrew Hanlon
- Gender: Coeducational
- Age: 11 to 18
- Enrollment: 1041
- Colours: Navy & White
- Publication: Marlborough News
- Website: Marlborough C of E School

The Marlborough C of E School is a coeducational Church of England secondary school in the market town of Woodstock, about 8 miles (13 km) northwest of Oxford. The school's catchment area includes Woodstock and surrounding villages. It is named after the Duke of Marlborough whose ancestral home, Blenheim Palace, is in Woodstock.

== History ==
The Marlborough C of E School was built in 1939 as a secondary modern. It was opened by the Bishop of Dorchester, suffragan bishop of the Anglican Diocese of Oxford. The original school was one single-storey building which became known as the main block. There is a foundation stone bearing the details of the opening of the school at the main entrance. The interior of the main block has been remodelled extensively over the years. Pam Maynard was heavily involved in the progression and development of the school.

After World War II, pre-fabricated ex-army barracks were erected at the west end of the site. At various times these were used for home economics teaching and as a sixth form common room. This block was finally replaced in 2009. The music and science buildings, sports hall, library and cafeteria were added in the 1970s as part of the ROSLA (Raising of the School Leaving Age) building programme.

=== 1970s to 1990s ===
From the 1970s through to 1985, the school had a reputation as a progressive comprehensive, with a focus on teaching how to learn and how to socialise, which it did with varying degrees of success. Former headmaster, Gerry O'Hagan, favoured CSEs (Certificate of Secondary Education, achievement graded by 1–5, 5 the lowest and 1 an equivalent to a C grade or above at O Level) over GCE (General Certificate of Education) O Level examinations as he prioritised cumulative and cooperative learning over competition. O'Hagan could be said to have been ahead of his time: The two examinations have since been replaced by the modern GCSE (General Certificate of Secondary Education).

The school suffered particularly badly from the underfunding of English state education in the 1980s and early 1990s under the Conservative government of Margaret Thatcher. Some of the Foreign Language Department and some parts of the English and Science Departments were based in temporary Portakabin classrooms on the east of the site. The largest of these, "the battleship" erected in the late 1980s was only replaced by a permanent building almost a decade later. Starting in the late 1980s, new language, mathematics and sixth form blocks were built to complement the existing science, music, library/cafeteria buildings and sports hall.

O'Hagan was replaced by Ed McConnell, who resigned in 2005 to reorganise Kent Education.

=== 21st century ===
In 2007, plans were unveiled for a £1-million school building with a new theatre, cinema and conference venue. This building, the Marlborough Enterprise Centre, opened in early 2007 and saw a student-led production of Joseph and the Amazing Technicolour Dreamcoat in July of the same year.

In 2010, a £3.8-million science center, dedicated to the memory of Oxfordshire County Councillor Brian Hodgson, was opened by Prof. Peter Dobson, director of Oxford University's Begbroke Science Park, and was blessed by the Bishop of Dorchester, Rev. Colin Fletcher.

In the 2008–2009 academic year the school enrolled more than a thousand pupils. It was the second most over-subscribed school in Oxfordshire, after Cherwell.

The school received the British Council's International School Award for 2009–2012 and 2012–2015. This is "an accreditation framework for schools to record and evaluate their international work and embed it into the curriculum and whole school ethos".

On 1 October 2012 the school converted to academy status.

Since 2018 and as of 2023 the school is sponsored by the River Learning Trust.

== Activities ==
The Marlborough School Chamber Choir has toured in Europe a number of times; visiting places such as Venice, Prague, the Santa Maria de Montserrat, and Barcelona. In July 2009 they travelled to Strasbourg and performed three concerts in and around the city. The Choir has also performed Christmas Carols at Blenheim Palace in 2007 and 2008, and released several recordings.

Every other year the School produces a Summer Show. These have included Oliver!, Grease, The Wizard of Oz, High School Musical, Bugsy Malone and School of Rock.

Marlborough students enjoy outdoor sports in Blenheim Park as well as a yearly "Fun Run" which pays for The Woodstock Pensioners Annual Christmas Dinner, and also donations to charities.

== Elective system ==
All students in years 7 to 10 enrol in the Electives system; only year 8 and upwards can choose desired options. An introductory programme exists for the Year 7 students. The school dedicates two hours on Wednesday afternoons for pupils for extra-curricular activities. At the end of a school term, students receive an Electives Brochure, and an Electives form, which allows students to choose an extra curricular activity for the following term. The students can choose from up to six options, putting listing them in order of preference. Three preferences will be allocated: Normally, the first preference is offered the first term, the second in the second term, and the third preference in the last term.

While most electives are free, some electives have transportation fees and course costs. Students can choose a variety of electives, from ones that help to improve fitness, to tutoring and personal leisure. The system is broad and ranges from the Duke of Edinburgh Award to needlework and equestrian sports.

== Ormerod department ==
Since 2005, The Marlborough School has included an embedded unit from the Ormerod School in Headington.

Ormerod School was named after the physician Arthur Latham Ormerod, who from 1901 until 1929 Sir Arthur was Oxford's first Medical Officer for Health. In 1928 he instigated the founding of the Ormerod School in Headington, on the site of the present John Radcliffe Hospital.

== The sixth form ==
The sixth form at Marlborough is an essential and integral body of the school. The students are mostly non-leavers from previous years; however, newcomers are welcomed. The Sixth Formers are allowed privileges which Year 7–11 students are denied, such as, a free dress code, meaning no school uniform is required. Students are allocated free periods in which they are expected to study.
