= Marlborough-Thomas =

The Marlborough-Thomas (possibly a.k.a. Marlborough) was a British car manufactured in a garage at Brooklands, Weybridge, Surrey between 1923 and 1924. It was a joint venture between T.B. André and J. G. Parry-Thomas from Wales, but only a handful of cars were made.

== The Cars ==
The 1493 cc four-cylinder engine had leaf spring valve gear as used on the Leyland Eight which Parry Thomas was also involved with. The car had an advanced specification with torsion bar suspension and four-wheel brakes. There was also a promised version with a double overhead cam engine. The cars were advertised at £575 but few appear to have reached customers.

== T.B. André ==
Theodore Bernard André was involved in the manufacture of Silent-bloc rubber bushed bearings; Hartford shock absorbers; Len Brake Co brake shoes; the Anglo/French Marlborough from 1906 until 1926; plus the André car between 1933 and 1934.

== See also ==
- List of car manufacturers of the United Kingdom
