= Boon Lake =

Boon Lake may refer to:

== Cities, towns, townships etc. ==
- Boon Lake Township, Minnesota

== Lakes ==
- Boon Lake (Minnesota), a lake in Renville County
- Boon Lake (Rhode Island)

== Other ==
- Boonlake (board game)

== See also ==
- Boone Lake (Tennessee)
- Lake Boon (Massachusetts)
