= Matthew Boon =

First English settler in current Stow, Massachusetts

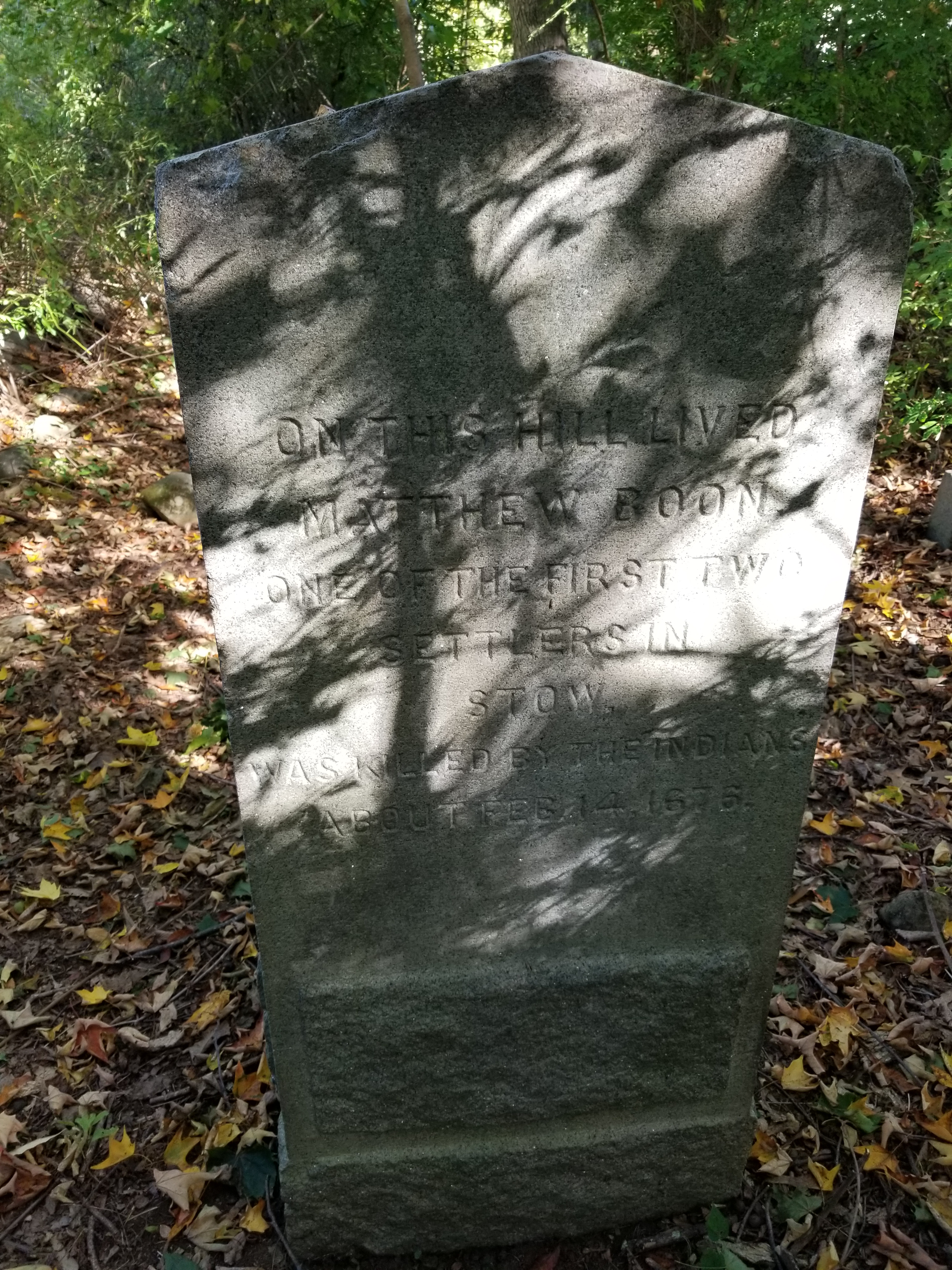
Matthew Boon Monument near 40 Barton Road in Stow Massachusetts

Matthew Boon (died 1676) was the first English settler in what is now Stow, Massachusetts. After his murder in 1676 by Native Americans, he became the namesake of what is now Lake Boon.

== Life and Death ==
Boon originally resided in Charlestown, Massachusetts. He moved to the area which is now Stow around 1660 and established a farm. Boon supposedly traded a jack knife to the local Nipmuc people for the right to reside on the land there. Settler John Kettell joined Boon around this same time, and the small settlement became known as Pompositticut Plantation. During King Philip's War in mid-February 1676 Boon and his family were sheltering at a garrison house in Sudbury, Massachusetts, but Boon and his son and a Thomas Plympton returned to his farm for provisions in an ox cart when he was alleged killed by Native Americans in the area between his pond and White's Pond. This area was "called Red Slough, near White Pond, which is also near [Hudson] and Sudbury lines." His body was never found.

== Legacy ==
After walking through the area on September 4, 1851, Henry David Thoreau wrote in his journal about Boon's death. At that time the pond was referred to as Boon's Pond, but after being purchased by Amory Maynard and enlarged by construction of a dam in order to add to the water supply for his woolen mill, it came to be known as Lake Boon. In 1883, the Town of Stow dedicated a monument near Lake Boon to mark the supposed spot of his home on a hill off what is now Barton Road.

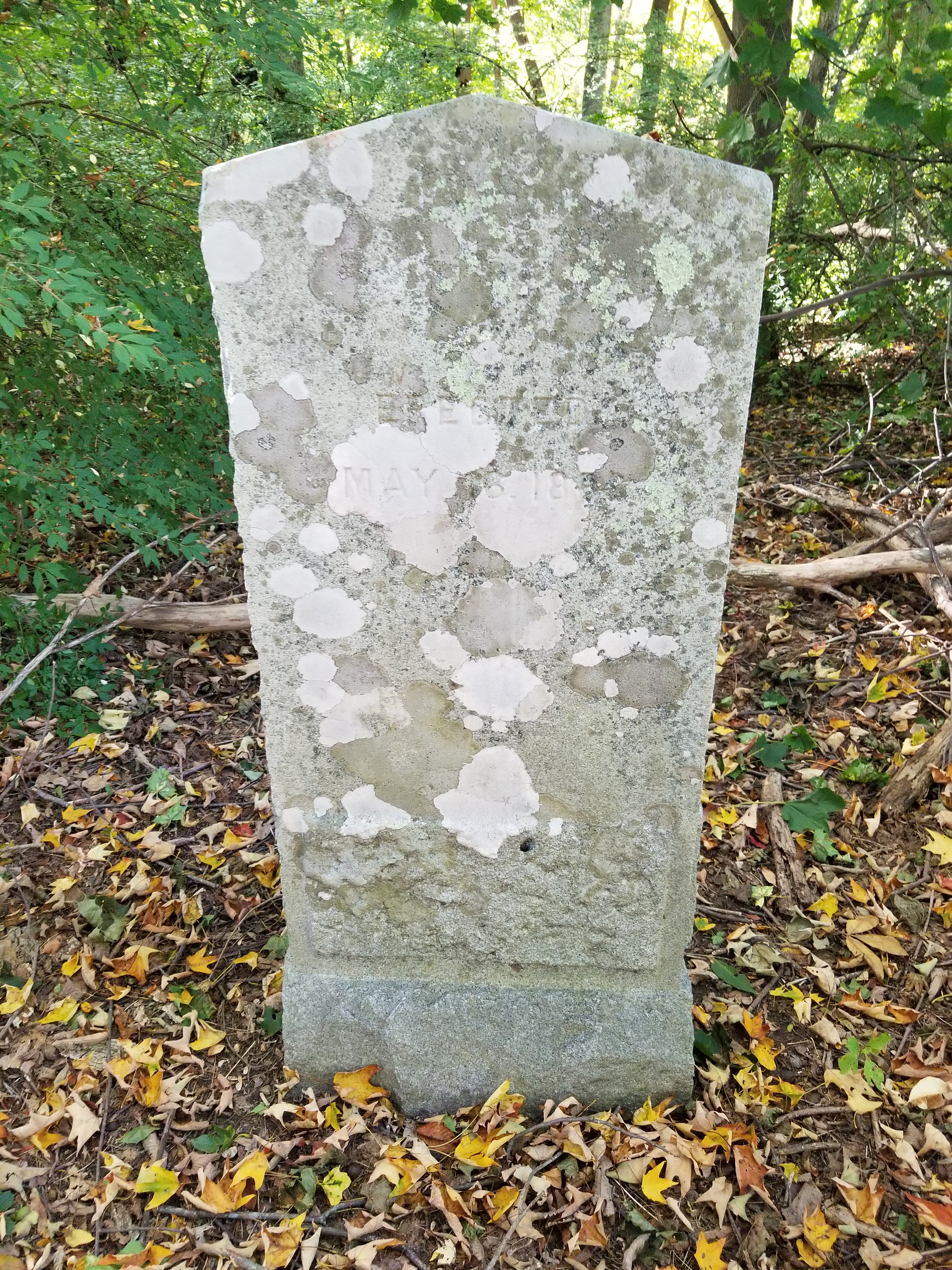
Reverse of Boon's Monument near 40 Barton Road in Stow Massachusetts

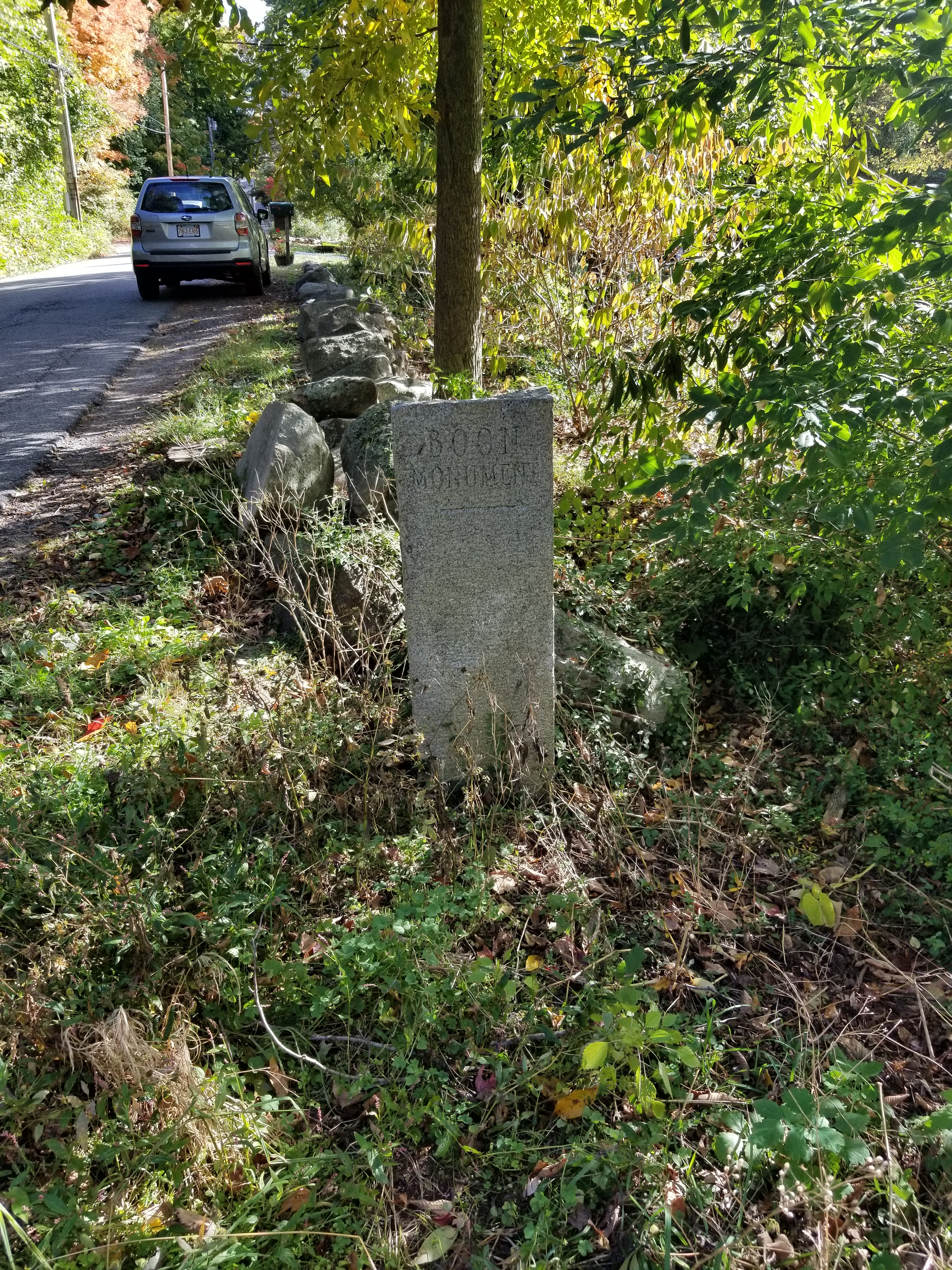
Granite marker pointing to the Boon Monument about 150 feet from the road in Stow Massachusetts
