= Crow Island Airport =

Crow Island Airpark
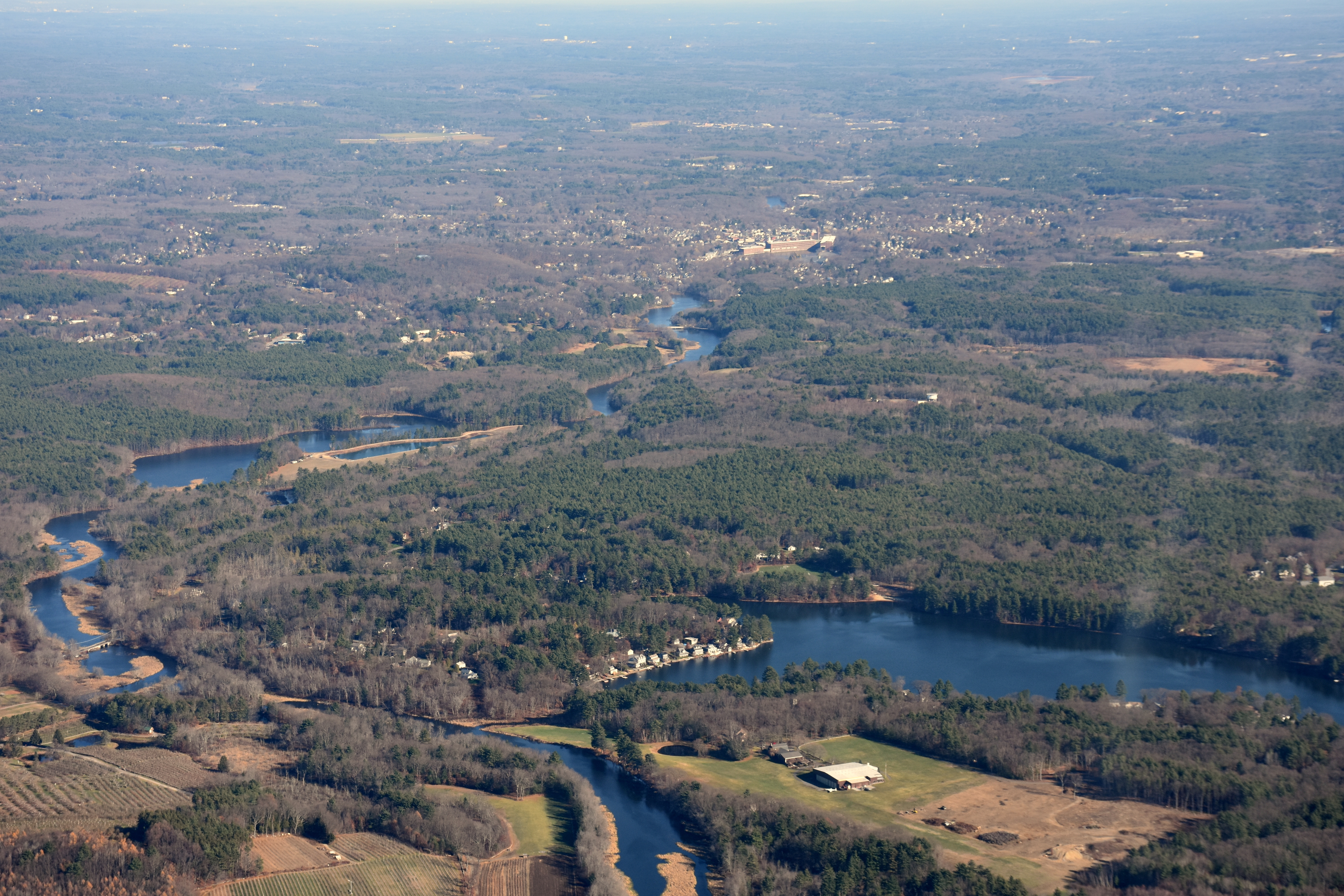
- Crow Island is located along the river just to the left of the center of the photo.
- IATA: 8MA4; ICAO: none

Summary
- Airport type: Private
- Owner: Robert Albright
- Serves: Stow
- Location: Stow, Massachusetts
- Coordinates: 42.417115°N 71.494420°W
- Website: www.crowislandairpark.com

Map
- Location of airport in Massachusetts

Runways
Direction	Length		Surface
Direction	ft	m	Surface
11/29	2,350	716	Turf
12W/30W	3,000	914	Water

Crow Island Airport (also known as Crow Island Airpark) is a private airport along the Assabet River in Stow, Massachusetts, United States, used by "pilots flying a variety of aircraft including, trikes, ultralights, vintage taildraggers, seaplanes, hang gliders, powered paragliders, powered parachutes, RC aircraft and more."

== History ==
Crow Island had previously been used for a gravel business operated by George Morey. In 1978 Rob Albright, an ultralight enthusiast, began flying there. By 1983, Albright had purchased the island and created the runway and pond.

In 2015, the town building inspector issued a cease and desist order to the airport. After an appeal, the town Zoning Board of Appeals overturned the order, as flight activities at Crow Island had been ongoing prior to the 1982 bylaw prohibiting flying in town and the nature of the activities had not changed.

As of 2020, about 30 planes rented space at Crow Island.
