= Walcott-Whitney House =

Historic house in Massachusetts, United States

- U.S. National Register of Historic Places
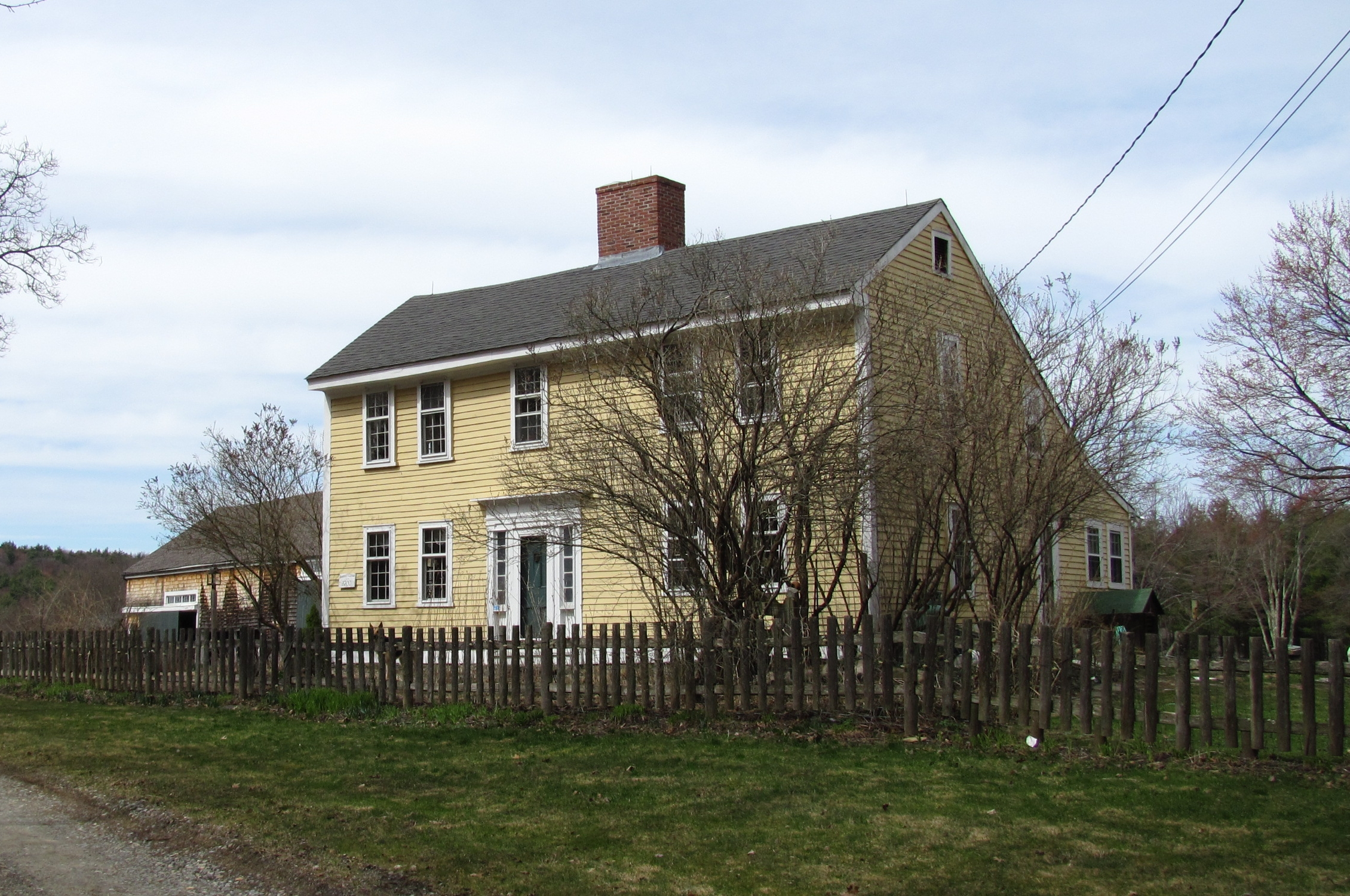
- Walcott-Whitney House

- Location within Massachusetts Location within the United States
- Location: 137 Tuttle Lane, Stow, Massachusetts
- Coordinates: 42°27′5″N 71°29′10″W
- Architectural style: Colonial
- MPS: First Period Buildings of Eastern Massachusetts TR
- NRHP reference No.: 90000183
- Added to NRHP: March 9, 1990

The Walcott-Whitney House is a historic late First Period house in Stow, Massachusetts. It is a 2 1/2-story timber-frame house, five bays wide, with a side gable roof, clapboard siding, and a large central chimney. A leanto extends to the rear, giving it a saltbox profile. The front facade is asymmetrical, with a roughly centered entrance that has a Federal period surround of sidelights, pilasters, and entablature with cornice. The house was built c. 1720–30, and is a well-preserved example of the period. It is particularly noted for its well-preserved front staircase.

The house was listed on the National Register of Historic Places in 1990.

== See also ==
- National Register of Historic Places listings in Middlesex County, Massachusetts
