= Randall–Hale Homestead =

Historic house in Massachusetts, United States

- U.S. National Register of Historic Places
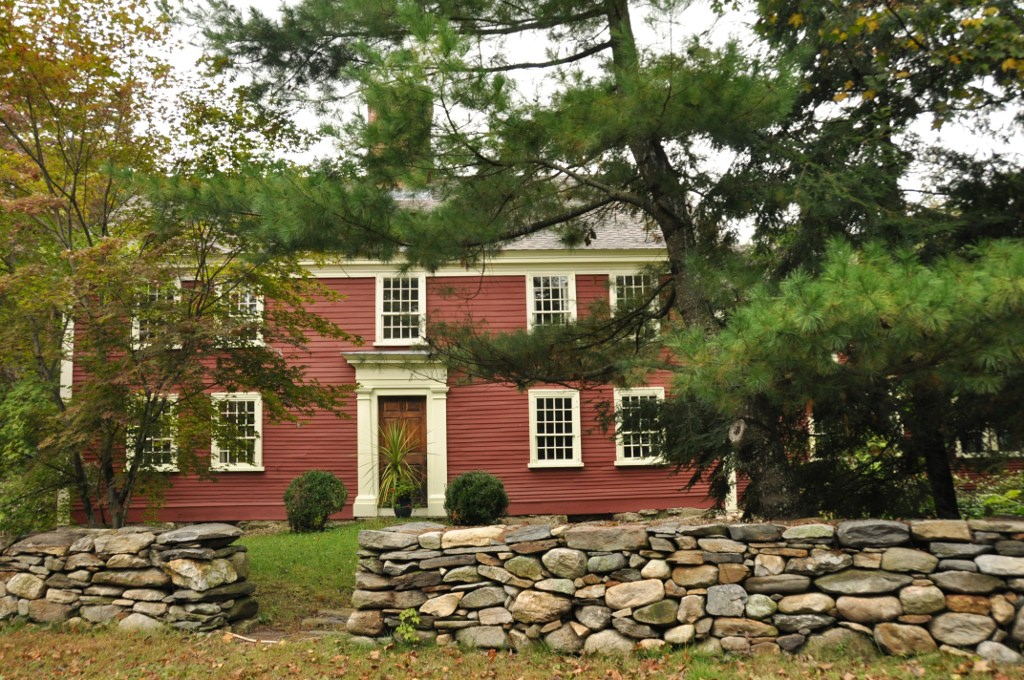

- Location within Massachusetts Location within the United States
- Location: Stow, Massachusetts
- Coordinates: 42°24′28″N 71°31′26″W
- Built: 1710
- Architect: Randall, Stephen
- Architectural style: Georgian
- NRHP reference No.: 96000277
- Added to NRHP: March 22, 1996

The Randall–Hale Homestead is a historic First Period house at 6 Sudbury Road in Stow, Massachusetts. The oldest portion of this 2 1/2-story timber-frame house was built c. 1710, making it one of Stow's oldest buildings. The main block, which is most prominently visible from the street, was enlarged to its present size c. 1760, and the building has had several further additions in the following 200+ years. The house was built by Stephen Randall, one of Stow's first landowners.

The house was listed on the National Register of Historic Places in 1996.

== See also ==
- National Register of Historic Places listings in Middlesex County, Massachusetts
