= Hapgood House =

Historic house in Massachusetts, United States

- U.S. National Register of Historic Places
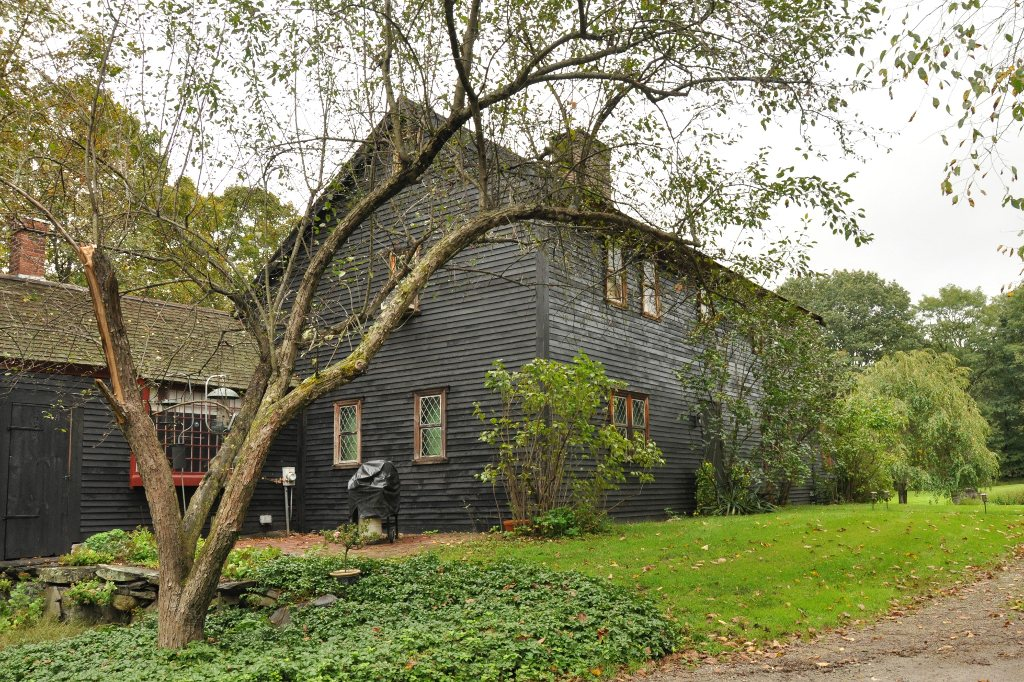

- Location within Massachusetts Location within the United States
- Location: 76 Treaty Elm Lane, Stow, Massachusetts
- Coordinates: 42°25′14″N 71°30′35″W
- Area: 1.3 acres (0.53 ha)
- Built: 1726
- Architectural style: Colonial
- MPS: First Period Buildings of Eastern Massachusetts TR
- NRHP reference No.: 90000180
- Added to NRHP: March 9, 1990

The Hapgood House is a historic house in Stow, Massachusetts. Built c. 1726, it is a well-preserved late First Period, including a rare surviving stairway balustrade from the period. The house was listed on the National Register of Historic Places in 1990.

== Description and history ==
The Hapgood House is set on the east side of Treaty Elm Lane, a rural residential dead-end street in central Stow, near a stream that descends to the Assabet River. It is a 2 1/2-story wood-frame structure, five bays wide, with a side-gable roof, large central chimney, and clapboard siding. A leanto section was added to the rear, giving the house a saltbox profile, and an ell extends to the right. The front eave is deeper than is typical for the period. The front rooms of the first floor have exposed beams with quirk beading, a late First Period feature, and the left room's fireplace includes the remains of a beehive oven. The entrance vestibule has a narrow winding staircase, with its original balustrade, a feature that rarely survives from houses of this period. The upstairs front chambers were probably plastered, also a late First Period feature. In the upper level of the leanto section, original exterior siding is visible, indicating the leanto was added later.

The oldest portion of this 2 1/2-story timber-frame house was probably built c. 1726, not long after Hezekiah Hapgood's marriage. It has a history of 200 years of association with his descendants.

== See also ==
- National Register of Historic Places listings in Middlesex County, Massachusetts
