= John Kettell =

American settler

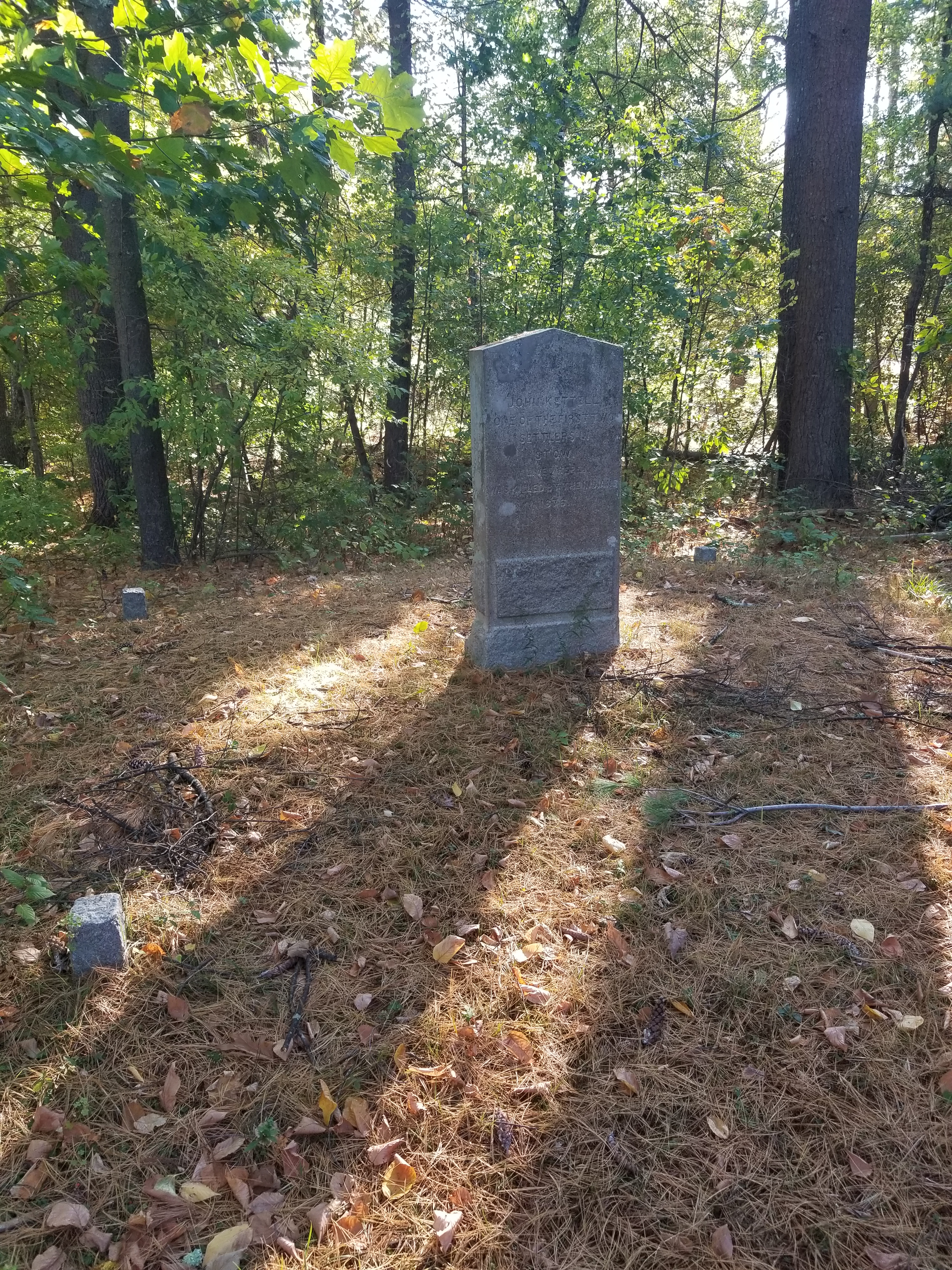
John Kettell Monument on Stiles Farm Road off Maple Road in Stow near his alleged cellar hole. The monument references his disputed death during an Indian attack in 1676

John Kettell (c.1639-c.1676 or 1685 or c.1690) (also known as John Kettle) was an early settler, cooper, and explorer in what is Maynard, Massachusetts and Stow, Massachusetts. Kettell's family was taken captive by Native Americans in King Philip's War in 1676.

== Biography ==
John Kettell was born in Charlestown, Massachusetts to Richard Kettell, a cooper, and Esther (Ward) and was baptized there in December 1639. Kettell had several siblings including Nathaniel, Joseph, Jonathan, Samuel, and Hannah. Kettell was likely a cooper. Kettell first married Sarah Goodnow, the daughter of Edmund Goodnow of Sudbury, Massachusetts, and they had three children, John, Sarah, and Joseph. After Sarah's death, John married Elizabeth Ward of Ipswich and had more children, including Jonathan, possibly James, and another daughter.

Around 1660 Kettell and Matthew Boon settled in what later became Stow and Maynard as the first settlers in that area. Kettle likely lived "in the vicinity of Pompassiticutt Hill, on land now included in Maynard" while others have controversially claimed that he lived closer to where his monument is located today. By 1663 Kettell was spending significant time in Portsmouth, New Hampshire. According to some disputed accounts, during King Philip's War in 1676 the Kettles fled to Rowlandson's garrison where John Kettle and his sons John and Joseph were killed in the Lancaster raid, and John's wife Elizabeth, and children, Sarah, Jonathan, and another daughter were taken captive and later redeemed with Mary Rowlandson and two other daughters escaped to Marlborough after almost starving.

In 1883 John Robbins of Stow conveyed to the town "land by an old cellar on Kettell Plain, which tradition informs us was the place where Kettell lived, and is about a quarter of a mile from the Bolton line." Today in Stow off the easterly side Maple Road on Stiles Farm Road, "there is...a large granite marker (1883) for John Kettell and family on Maple Street (near the Hudson/Bolton line), a[n]...early family who 'escaped' to the Lancaster Garrison during the Indians raids." A public right of way reserved by the town exists along Stiles Farm Road to visit the monument.

== Disagreement about later life ==
According to one source Kettell's monument also "inaccurately states that he was killed during the Indian raids. He did not die from this attack." Historian Rev. George F. Clark claimed it is "a doubtful story about Kettle himself having been captured and killed by the [Indians]. He probably died at sea about 1690" after spending much of his life as a cooper in Portsmouth, New Hampshire according to probate and tax records in both Massachusetts and New Hampshire. Clark points to primary sources showing that Indian scribe James Printer wrote to Kettell negotiating for the release of Kettell's family, so Kettell was likely alive for some time after the Lancaster raid. Clark also disputes the evidence that John Kettell owned the land in Stow where his monument was erected due to local tradition, but agrees that Kettell (Kittle) does appear to have lived in the general area for a period on one of the farms of mariner Abraham Joslin according to Joslin's will probated in 1671, and the several Joslins were killed and abducted in the Lancaster raid along with the Kettells. According to Clark, "[i]n March 1675–76, just after the Lancaster raid, [Kettell] was a culler [and packer] of fish at Great Island, now New Castle, N.H. and made a deposition in Exeter in 1678 stating he was about 38 years old which lines up with the birth date of John Kettell of Charlestown. In 1720-21 Nathaniel Kettell requested a commission appraise his brother, John's, estate and stated that his brother disappeared at sea about thirty years prior.

There is also a source that mentions a John Kettell of Gloucester who died in Salem, Massachusetts on 12 October 1685 with probate records showing he owned 300 acres of land at Nashaway (likely including the monument site in what is now Stow on what was referred to later as Kettell farm), but this John was about eighteen years older than the John born in Charlestown; it doesn't seem like he would have been the Mr. Kettle living on Joslin's land if he had his own large farm. In the 1890s Rev. George F. Clark and Abraham G.R. Hale engaged in an influential published debate in The New England Historical and Genealogical Register regarding genealogical methodology, specifically using original documents (Clark) versus tradition (Hale), and the subject of their debate was life and death of John Kettell, the cooper from Charlestown, and his family and the inaccurate monument.

Besides the monument, Kettell's name is memorialized in several places, including Kettell Plain Road and the Kettell Farm Conservation Property in Stow.

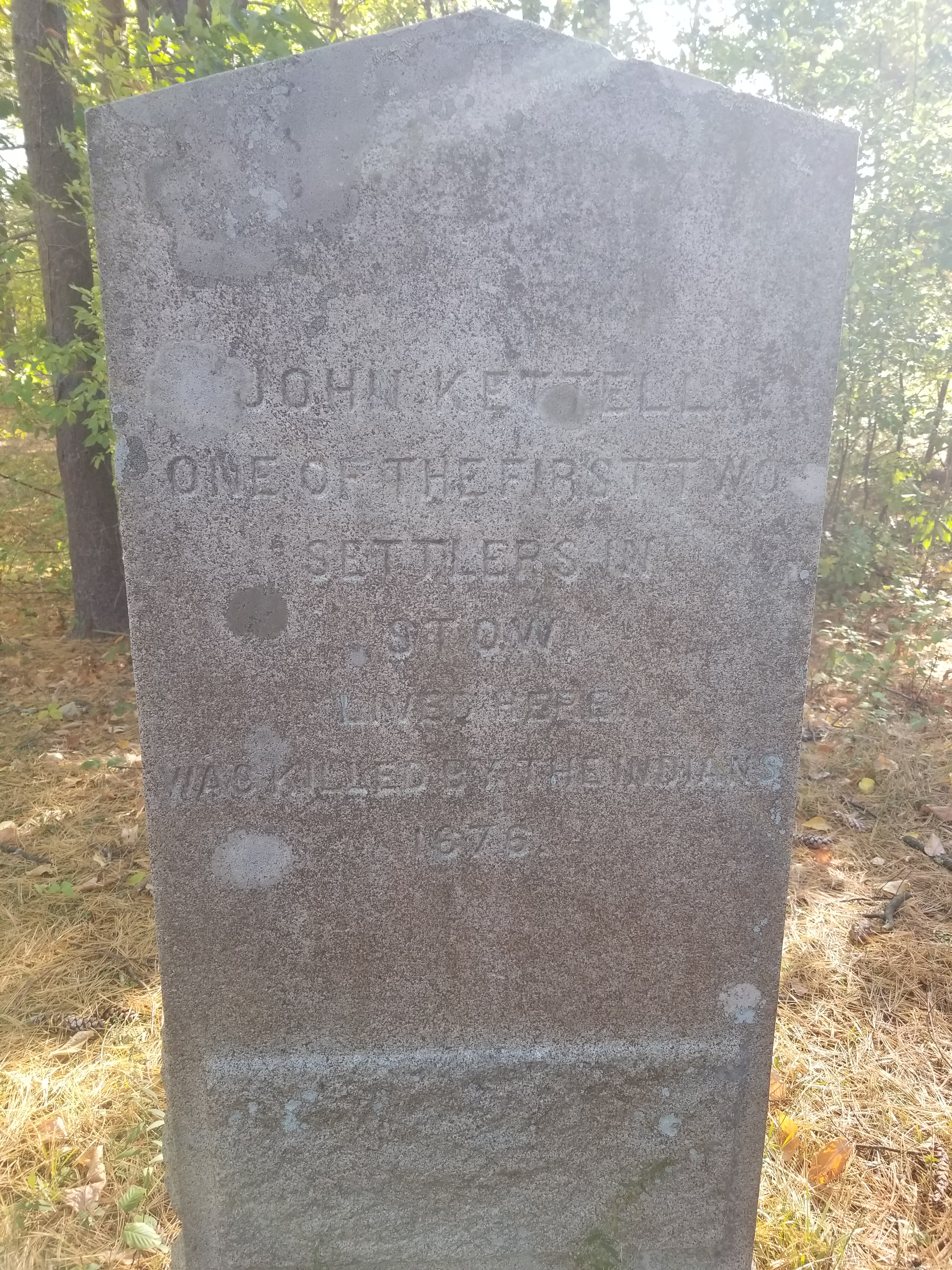
Kettell Monument obverse

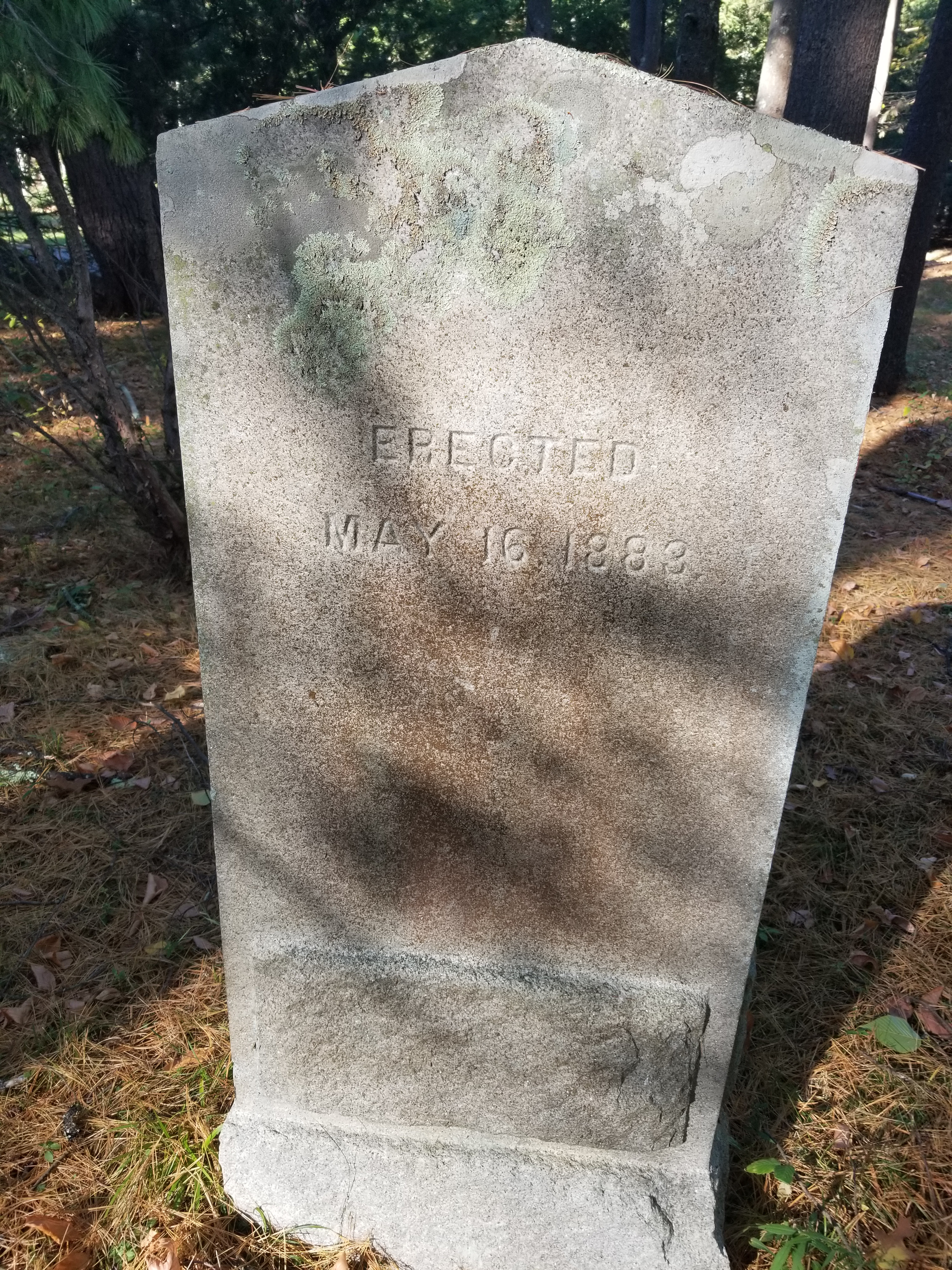
Kettell Monument reverse

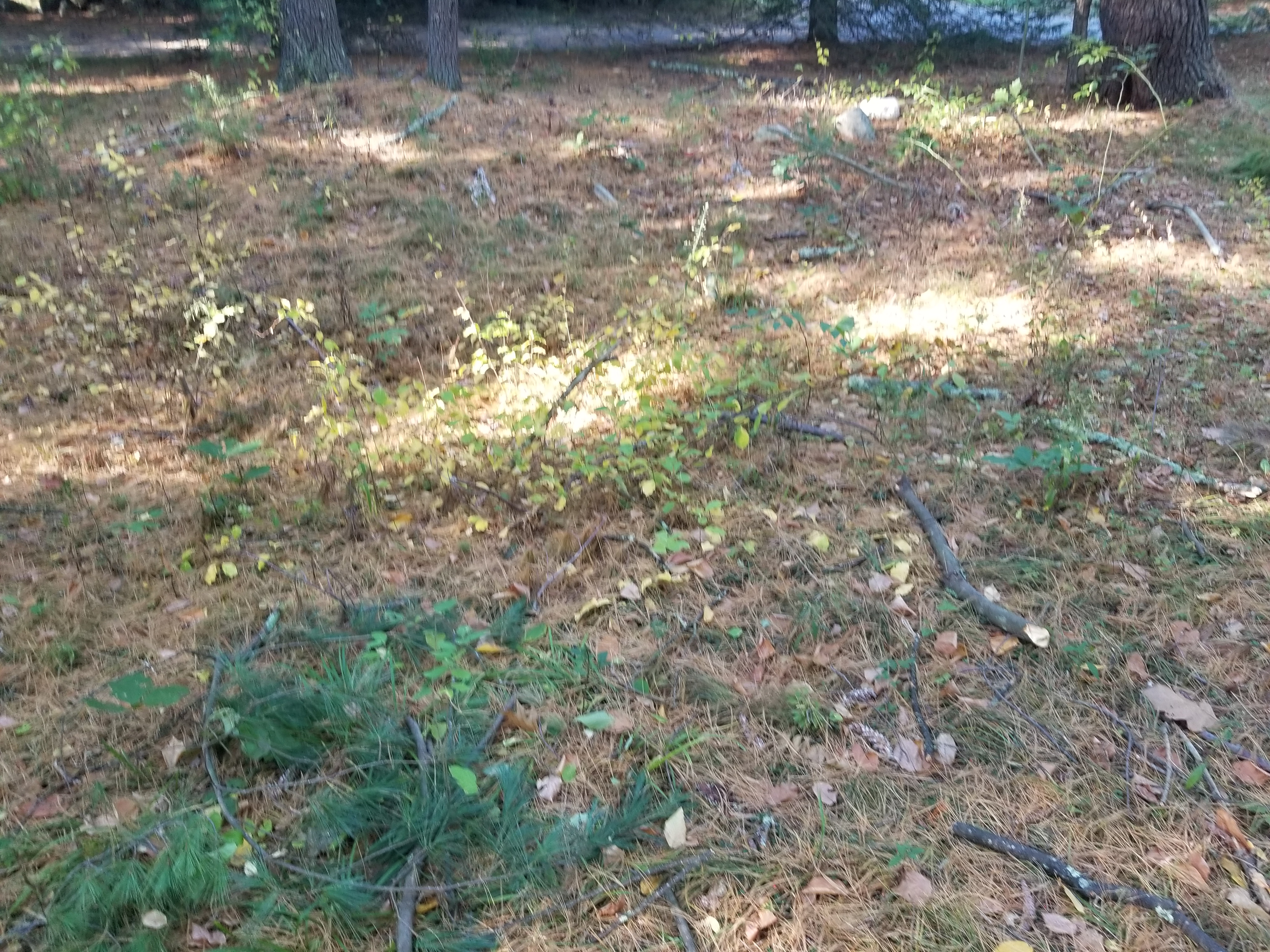
John Kettell cellar hole near Kettell Monument

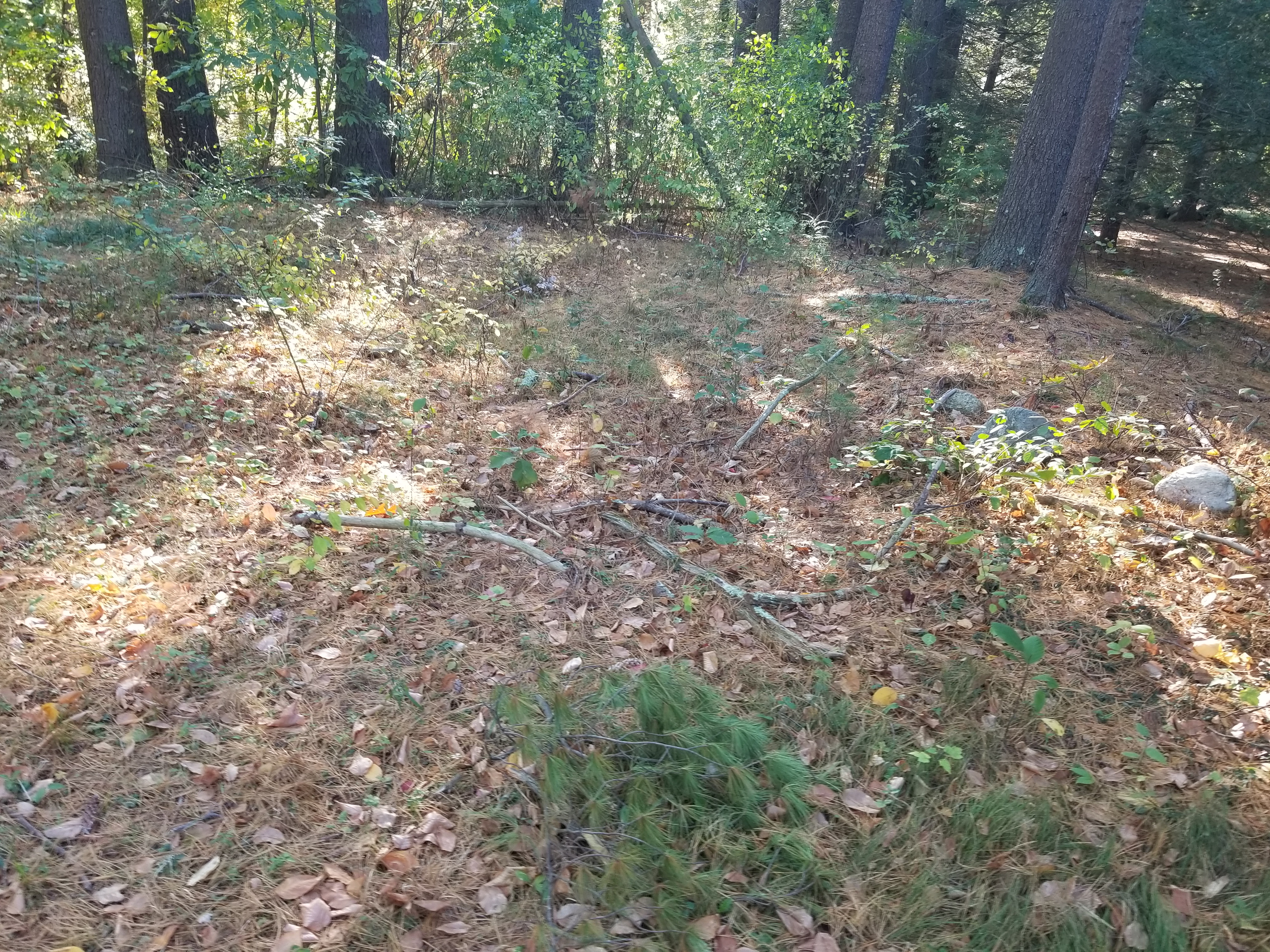
Kettell cellar hole

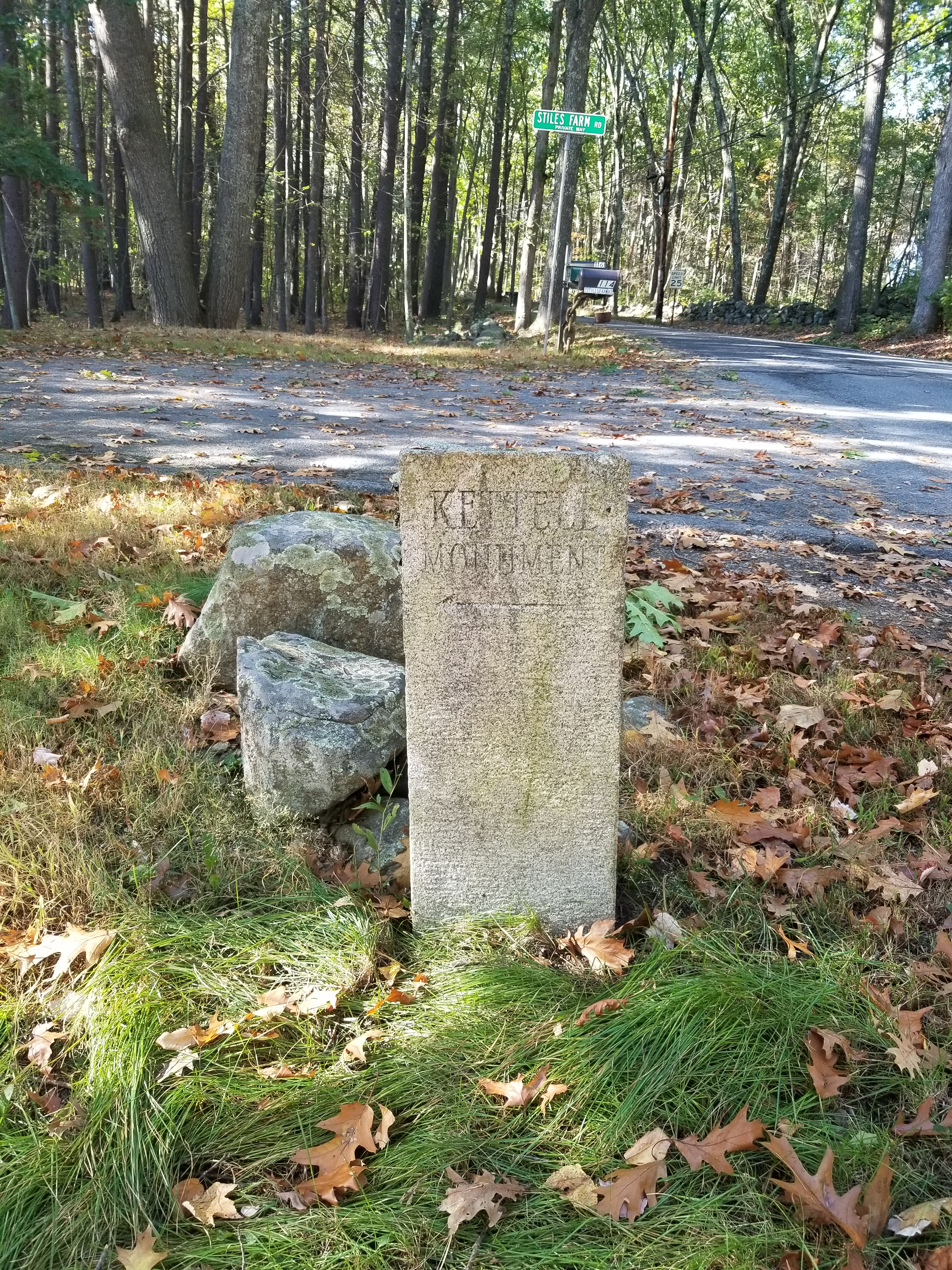
Granite Monument on Maple Road pointing to the Kettell Monument on Stiles Farm Road
