= White Pond (Massachusetts) =

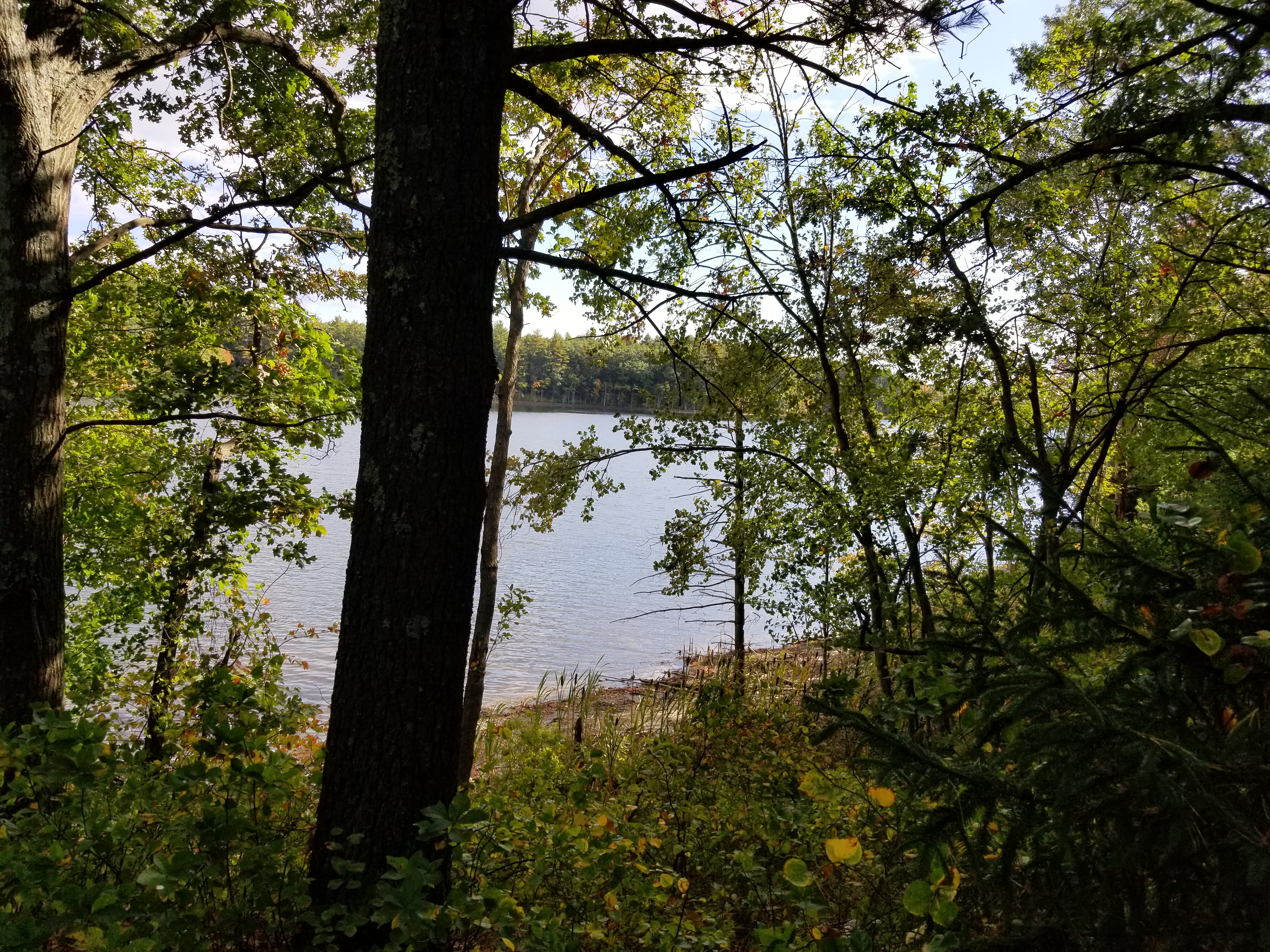

- Location within Massachusetts Location within the United States
- Location: Stow and Hudson, Massachusetts
- Coordinates: 42°23′29″N 71°28′49″W
- Type: reservoir/lake
- Basin countries: United States
- Surface area: 58.5 acres (23.7 ha)

White Pond is a 58.5 acre lake and reservoir within the towns of Stow and Hudson, in Middlesex County, Massachusetts. The lake has historically provided a source of drinking water to the town of Maynard, and Maynard maintains water rights to the pond and owns some of the land surrounding it. White Pond is adjacent to Lake Boon but their waters are not connected.

== History ==
A nineteenth century writer described White Pond as "a fine sheet of water, situated in a level, sandy section of town, and [it] takes its name from the white, sandy bottom, which gives its hue to the water." By 1828 a railroad corporation surveyed a route around White Pond, and eventually constructed railroad tracks along one side of the pond. By the mid-1800s, "White Pond had a large commercial ice cutting operation functioning on its shores, and [a]n ice house was situated next to the pond near an old railroad." In 1888 the Commonwealth granted the Town of Maynard water rights to White Pond, and in 1889 Maynard built a three-mile pipeline to carry water by gravity to Maynard where it was pumped to a reservoir atop Summer Hill for distribution throughout the town.

In 1935 the Civil Works Administration (C.W.A.) and Federal Emergency Relief Administration (F.E.R.A.) cleaned up the forest surrounding the pond and planted new trees. In 1942 the water pipeline to Maynard was replaced with a ten-inch diameter, concrete pipe. Due to droughts affecting the level of White Pond, in 1964, Maynard acquired a well within the adjacent U.S. Army Reservation (now Assabet River National Wildlife Refuge) to pump water into White Pond when it was low, and in 1972 and 1973 Maynard acquired other wells, the Quirk Wells off Old Marlboro Road. White Pond continued to provide Maynard with drinking water until it was decommissioned in the 1990s because the system required an investment to be updated to comply with the EPA Surface Water Treatment Rule. Maynard switched entirely to wells for its water supply.

The town still holds water rights to White Pond, and in 2019 discussed reactivating this water supply through the Refuge to diversify the town's water supply. Cost estimates were approximately $20 million for a water treatment plant and $9 million for replacing the 1942 pipeline.

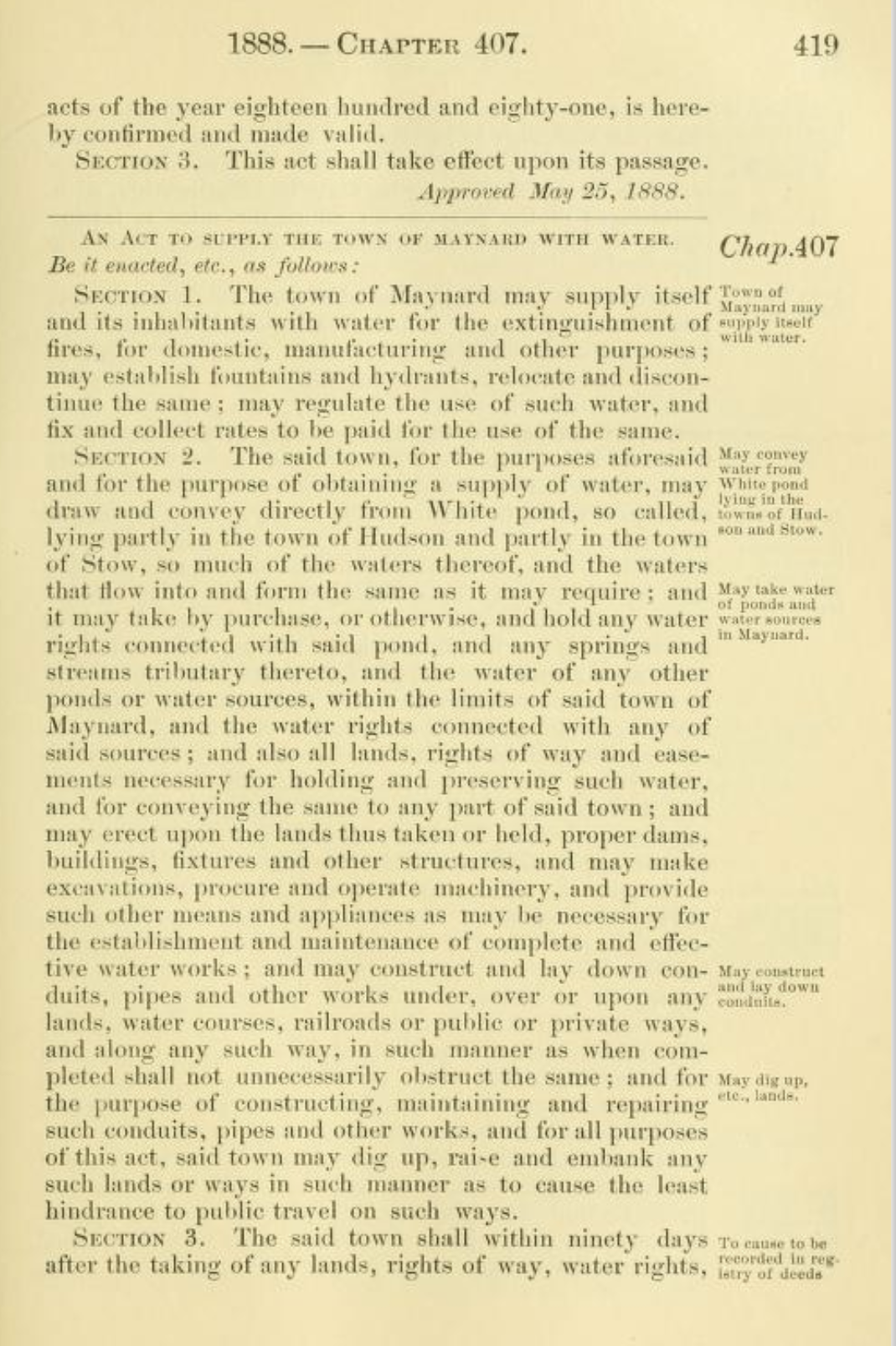
Act in 1888 granting Maynard Massachusetts water rights to White Pond in Stow and Hudson Massachusetts

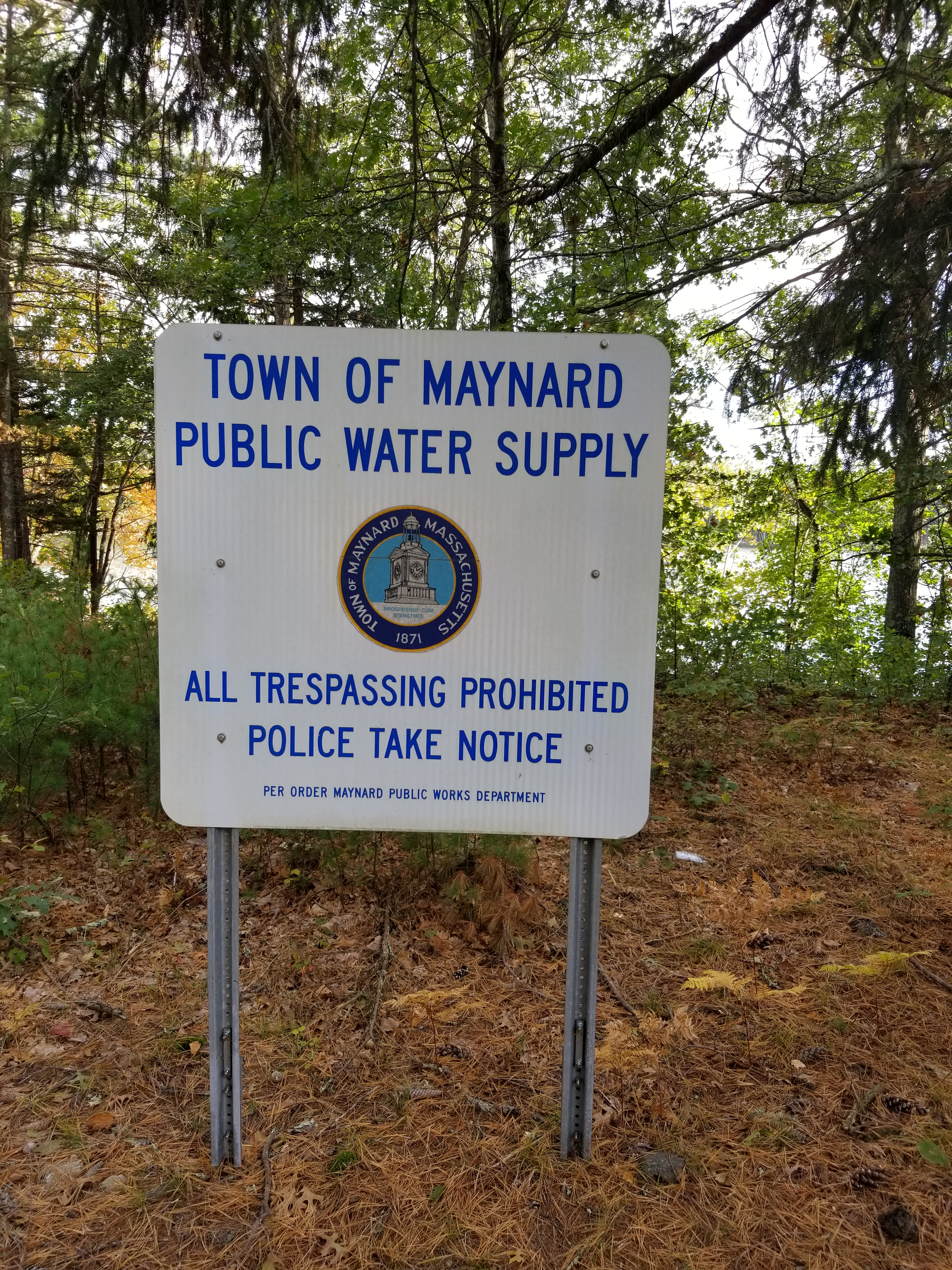
Town of Maynard Water Supply Sign at White Pond in Stow, Massachusetts

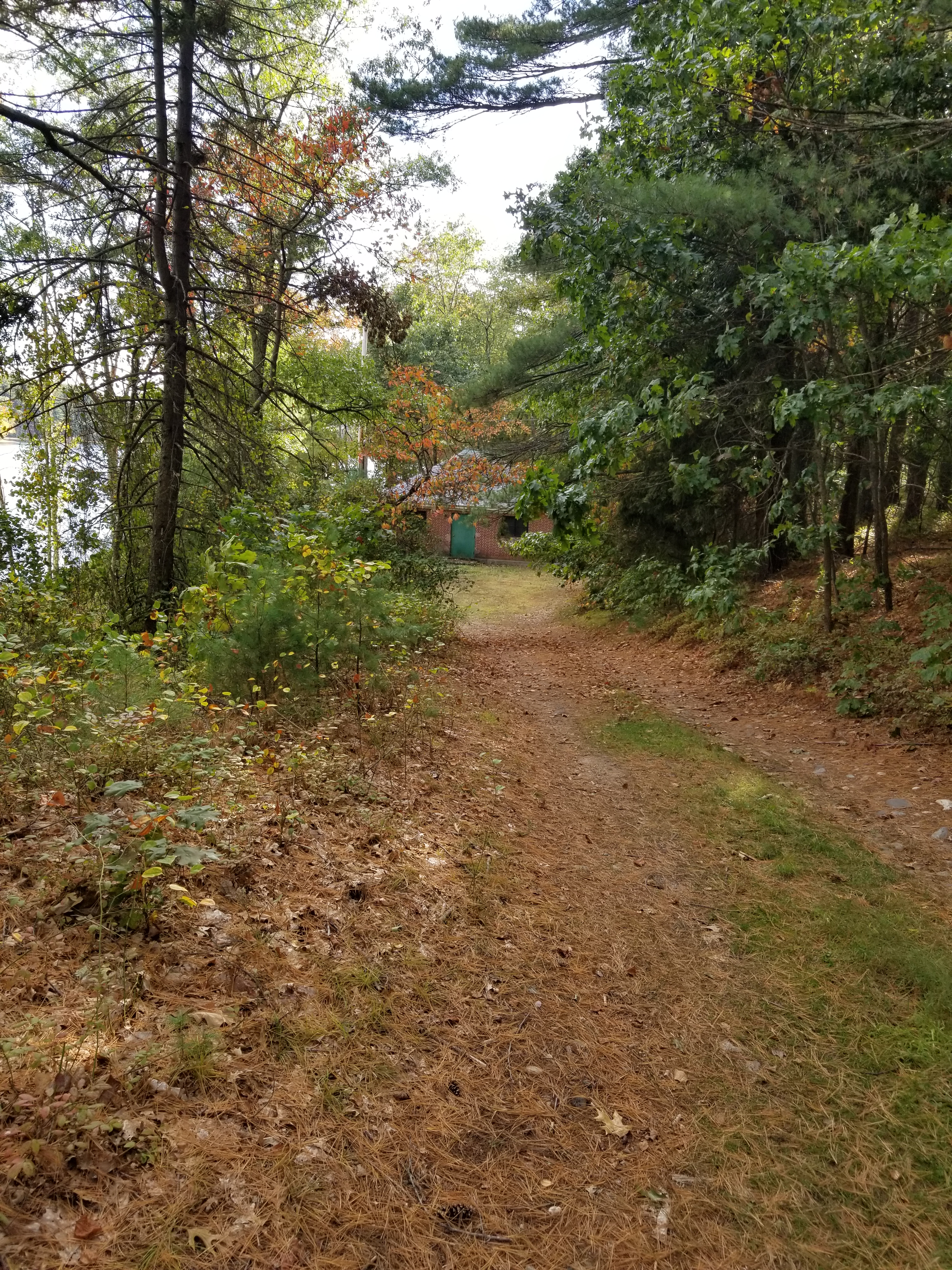
Maynard Water building at White Pond in Stow, Massachusetts
