= Stow, Massachusetts =

Town in Massachusetts, United States

- Town
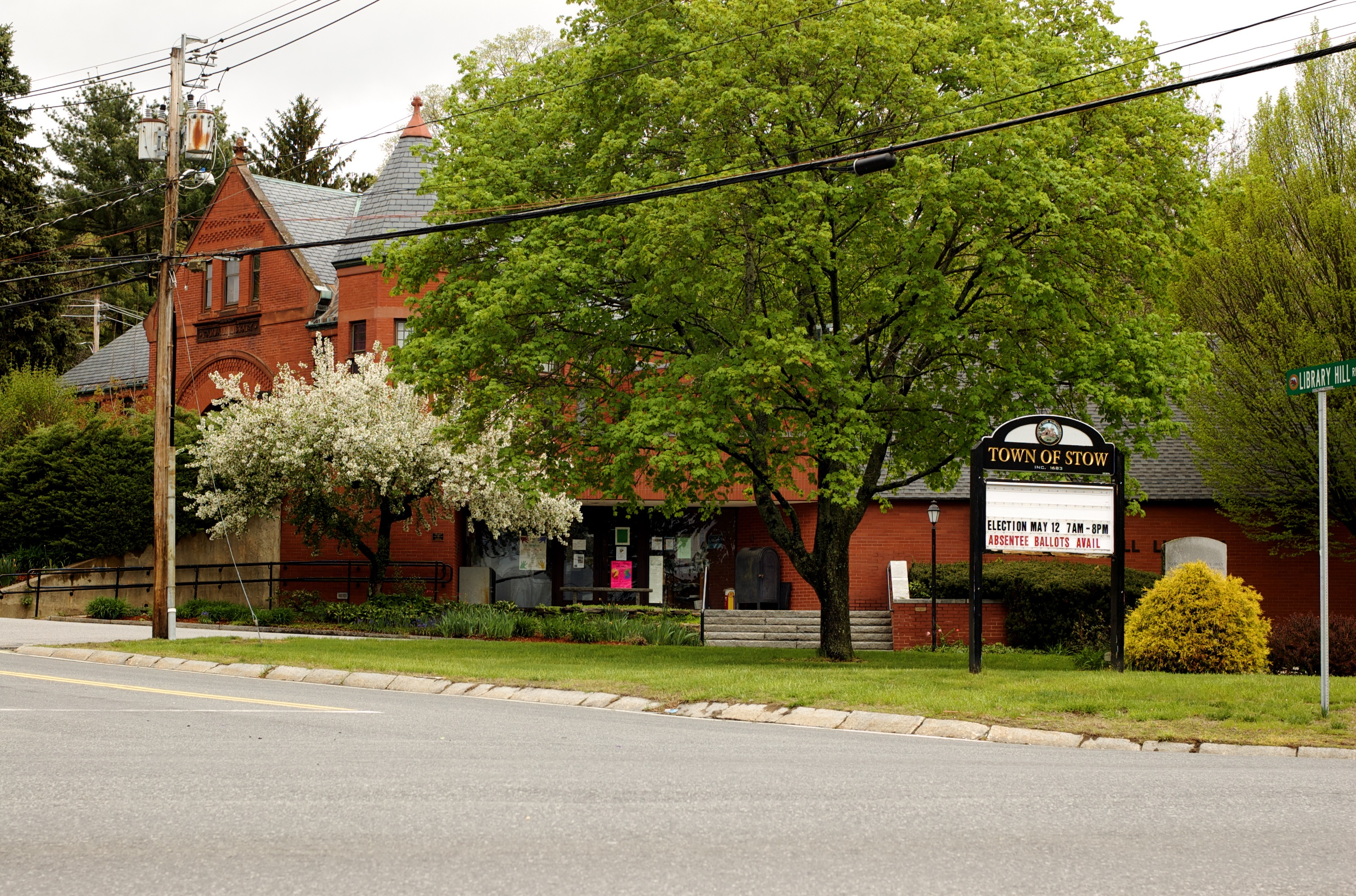
- Town center of Stow

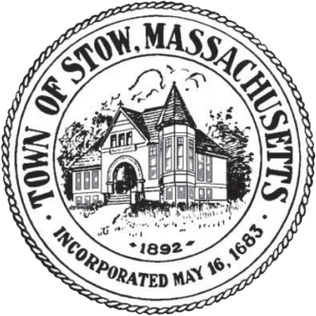
- Seal
- Motto: "A place for growing up in and a place for coming back to"
- Location of Stow in Middlesex County, Massachusetts
- Coordinates: 42°26′13″N 71°30′22″W
- Country: United States
- State: Massachusetts
- County: Middlesex
- Settled: c. 1660
- Established: 1669
- Incorporated: May 16, 1683

Government
  - Type: Open town meeting
  - Town Administrator: Denise Dembkoski

Area
  - Total: 18.1 sq mi (46.9 km^{2})
  - Land: 17.6 sq mi (45.6 km^{2})
  - Water: 0.46 sq mi (1.2 km^{2})
- Elevation: 230 ft (70 m)

Population (2020)
  - Total: 7,174
  - Density: 407.6/sq mi (157.4/km^{2})
- Time zone: UTC−5 (Eastern)
  - Summer (DST): UTC−4 (Eastern)
- ZIP Code: 01775
- Area code: 351/978
- FIPS code: 25-68050
- GNIS feature ID: 0618236
- Website: www.stow-ma.gov

Stow is a town in Middlesex County, Massachusetts, United States. The town is located 21 miles (34 km) west of Boston, in the MetroWest region of Massachusetts. The population was 7,174 at the 2020 census. Stow was officially incorporated in 1683 with an area of approximately 40 square miles (100 km^{2}).

Over centuries it gave up land as newer, smaller towns were created, ceding land to Harvard (1732), Shirley (1765), Boxborough (1783), Hudson (1866) and Maynard (1871). Stow now has an area of 18.1 square miles (47 km^{2}). With the exception of factories at Assabet Village and Rock Bottom (later Maynard and Gleasondale), Stow was primarily sparsely settled farm and orchard land until the 1950s.

== History ==
Previous to its incorporation in 1683, Stow was called Pompositticut Plantation. Stow was officially incorporated in 1683. The earliest Colonial settlers, c. 1660, were Matthew Boon and John Kettell, who settled the land of Tantamous (Jethro), a Native American, whose land was called "Pompocitticut." Boon settled by a pond (later bearing his name: Lake Boon) with a vast tract of land surrounding him. It is said that he traded all this for a single jackknife. A monument bearing his name is located on the plot of land where he formerly resided. John Kettell took up residence in a portion of land in the southwestern corner of Stow where another monument marks the alleged site of his farm. Both families were affected by King Philip's War, an attempt by Native Americans to drive out colonists. Boon and Kettell were killed. Their families had been moved to other locations, and survived. The area that was to become Stow was not resettled by colonists for several years.

The original development of Stow—a mile east of the current center, became known as Lower Village after a meeting hall, and later, churches, were built to the west. The old cemetery on Route 117/62 is officially Lower Village Cemetery. On October 28, 1774, Henry Gardner, a Stow resident, was elected Receiver-General of the Massachusetts Provincial Congress, the government of Massachusetts during the American Revolution. After the war, Gardner served as state treasurer. Gardner's grandson, also Henry Gardner, was the governor of Massachusetts from 1855 to 1857.

As with many colonial-era Massachusetts towns, Stow started with a large area and gave up land as newer, smaller towns were created. Stow ceded land to Harvard (1732), Shirley (1765), Boxborough (1783), Hudson (1866) and Maynard (1871). Stow lost 1300 acres (5.3 km^{2}) and close to half its population to the creation of Maynard. Prior to that, what became Maynard was known as "Assabet Village" but was legally still part of the towns of Stow and Sudbury. There were some exploratory town-founding efforts in 1870, followed by a petition to the Commonwealth of Massachusetts, filed January 26, 1871. Both parent towns opposed this effort, but state approval was granted April 19, 1871. The population of the newly formed town—at 1,820—was larger than either of its parent towns. In return, the new town paid Sudbury and Stow about $23,600 and $8,000 respectively. Sudbury received more money because it owned shares in the railroad, the wool and paper mills were in Sudbury, and more land came from Sudbury.

In 1942 the U.S. Army seized about one-tenth of the town's land area, from the south side, to create a munitions storage facility. Land owners were evicted. The land remained military property for years. In 2005 it became part of the Assabet River National Wildlife Refuge.

The modern butternut squash was developed by Charles Leggett in Stow in 1944; the Leggett Woodlands in the town are named after his family, after his wife donated the land. The squash was developed in a field across from the woodland.

On New Year's Day, 1984, Kevin Walsh took off from Minute Man Air Field with 57 helium balloons tied to a lawn chair, later descending by parachute. He was cited with four violations of FAA regulations and fined $4,000 ($10,922.66 adjusted for inflation to 2022). He reached an altitude of 9,000 feet (2,700 m).

Stow is the town where cable modem technology was first tested. In 1989, hardware manufacture LANcity, pioneering the idea of using existing cable infrastructure to transmit digital information, tested the concept with houses located off of Packard Road.

From 2022 until 2025, Stow was one of the only municipalities in Massachusetts to not have a Dunkin' Donuts, after the two in town closed down that year, for which the town received attention on social media. On July 24, 2025, a new Dunkin' Donuts opened in Great Road. On the same day, the town was temporarily renamed to Dunkin' in commemoration of the event, following a unanimous vote from the Stow Select Board.

In 2024 and 2025, a Stow police officer used Flock to access personal information of a person that the officer knew. The police department filed a criminal complaint against the officer on July 17, 2026, and on August 18, 2026 the town announced that it was ending its relationship with Flock.

== Geography ==
According to the United States Census Bureau, the town has a total area of 18.1 square miles (47 km^{2}), of which 17.6 square miles (46 km^{2}) is land and 0.5 square miles (1.3 km^{2}) (2.60%) is water. It is located in eastern/central Massachusetts.

Major bodies of water are Assabet River, Elizabeth Brook, Lake Boon, White's Pond and Delaney Flood Control Project, in the northwest corner. The Assabet River flows through Stow from west to east, spanned by three bridges. Average flow in the river is 200 cubic feet per second. However, in summer months the average drops to under 100 cfs. The flood of March 2010 reached 2,500 cfs. Recent, monthly and annual riverflow data—measured in Maynard—is available from the U.S. Geological Service.

== Gleasondale ==
The village of Gleasondale is in both Hudson and Stow. Gleasondale was originally known as Randall's Mills, and then later became known as Rock Bottom. The name "Rock Bottom" came about after a workman struck a solid rock while digging the mill's foundations and a coworker cried out, "You've struck rock bottom!" The name was changed to Gleasondale in 1898 after two of the original mill owners, Mr. Gleason and Mr. Dale. An 1856 map shows Assabet as a village on the eastern border – this became the center of the Town of Maynard in 1871.

== Demographics ==
Historical population
Year	Pop.	±%
1790	801	—
1850	1,455	+81.6%
1860	1,641	+12.8%
1870	1,813	+10.5%
1880	1,045	−42.4%
1890	903	−13.6%
1900	1,002	+11.0%
1910	1,115	+11.3%
1920	1,101	−1.3%
1930	1,142	+3.7%
1940	1,243	+8.8%
1950	1,700	+36.8%
1960	2,573	+51.4%
1970	3,984	+54.8%
1980	5,144	+29.1%
1990	5,328	+3.6%
2000	5,902	+10.8%
2010	6,590	+11.7%
2020	7,174	+8.9%
2024*	7,335	+2.2%
* = population estimate. Source: United States census records and Population Estimates Program data.

As of the census of 2018, there were 7,214 people, 2,575 households, and 2,090 families residing in the town. The population density was 380.6 inhabitants per square mile (147.0/km^{2}). There were 2,526 housing units at an average density of 143.5 per square mile (55.4/km^{2}). The racial makeup of the town was 91.8% White, 2.7% African American, 0.2% Native American, 3.9% Asian, 0.4% from other races, and 1.9% from two or more races. Hispanic or Latino people of any race were 2.8% of the population.

There were 2,575 households, out of which 25.8% had children under the age of 18 living with them, 69.7% were married couples living together, 2.2% had a male householder with no wife present, 6.4% had a female householder with no husband present, and 21.7% were non-families. The householder of 17.4% of all households were living alone and 16.7% was 65 years of age or older. The average household size was 2.75 people and the average family size was 3.10 people.

In the town, the population was spread out, with 28.2% under the age of 20, 24.6% from 20 to 44, 34.5% from 45 to 64, and 12.7% who were 65 years of age or older. The median age was 43.5 years. For every 100 males there were 103.1 females. For every 100 males age 18 and over, there were 106.8 females.

As of 2015, the median income for a household in the town was $137,551, and the median income for a family was $153,763. The per capita income for the town was $51,081. About 2.7% of families and 4.5% of the population were below the poverty line, including 4.7% of those under age 18 and 3.1% of those age 65 or over.

== Points of interest ==
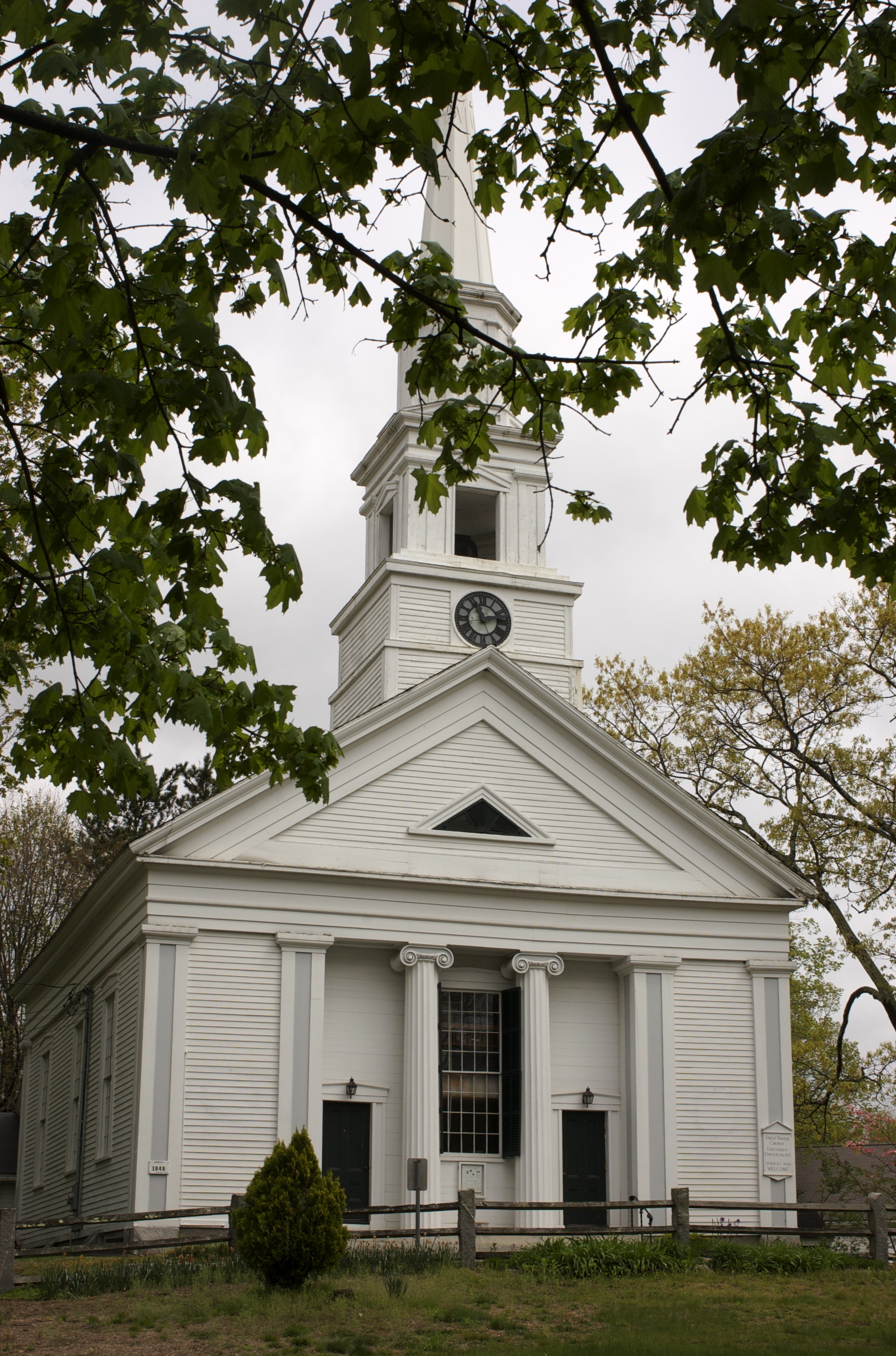
First Parish Church

=== Golf ===
Stow is known for its four golf courses (81 total holes). The best known of these is Stow Acres Country Club (36 holes), the site of the 1995 US Amateur Public Links Championship.

The south course, formerly known as Mapledale Country Club, hosted a nine-hole course that was the first course designed, operated, and managed by a Black man, Robert H. Hawkins. Hawkins bought the property in 1926, and it was home to the first three United States Colored Golf Association (USCGA) Opens from 1926 to 1928.

=== Apple orchards and farms ===
Stow is also well known for its apple orchards (Carver Hill, Small Farm, Derby Ridge Farms, Honey Pot Hill, One Stack Farm and Shelburne Farms), which provide tourism for the town in the fall.

=== Town center ===
The town center contains a memorial for the Stow soldiers lost in the French and Indian War, Revolutionary War, both World Wars, the Korean War, the Vietnam War, and the various U.S. involvements in the Middle East. Townspeople gather at the site on Memorial Day.

Near the Randall Library (named after John Witt Randall) is a trolley station from when the town was connected by trolley line to Boston and Waltham.

=== Assabet Wildlife Sanctuary ===
A significant portion of the Assabet River National Wildlife Refuge (opened in 2005) is located in Stow.

=== American Heritage Museum ===
A military history museum built in 2018 and located on the grounds of the Collings Foundation, with a large collection of tanks and other artifacts from World War I, World War II, the Korean War, Vietnam War, Gulf War, Iraq War, the September 11 attacks, and the war on terrorism.

=== Pine Bluff ===
Pine Bluff is a 34-acre (14 ha) park and beach located off Sudbury Road on the northern shore of Lake Boon. It underwent renovations in 2017–2018 to have a pavilion, restrooms, and be more accessible. The forest nearby contains many trails including well as a dropoff for launching canoes and kayaks, and contains a tire swing overlooking the lake as well as a popular hill.

=== Historic houses ===
Stow contains multiple buildings on the National Register of Historic Places, including the Walcott-Whitney House, Tenney Homestead, Randall–Hale Homestead, Hapgood House, and Brown–Stow House.

== Government ==
Stow uses the open town meeting form of town government popular in small to mid-sized Massachusetts towns. Anyone may attend a town meeting, but only registered voters may vote. Before the meeting, a warrant is distributed to households in Stow and posted on the town's website. Each article in the warrant is debated and voted on separately. Stow does not require a defined minimum of registered voters to hold a town meeting and vote on town business, i.e., zero quorum. Important budgetary issues approved at a town meeting must be passed by a subsequent ballot vote. Stow's elected officials are a five-member Board of Selectmen. Each member is elected to a three-year term. Also filled by election are the School Committee, Housing Authority, Randall Library Trustees and a Moderator to preside over the town meetings. Positions filled by appointment include the Town Administrator and other positions. On August 25, 2026, the Stow Select Board appointed Ans Ishfaq as a town constable for a term ending June 30, 2029.

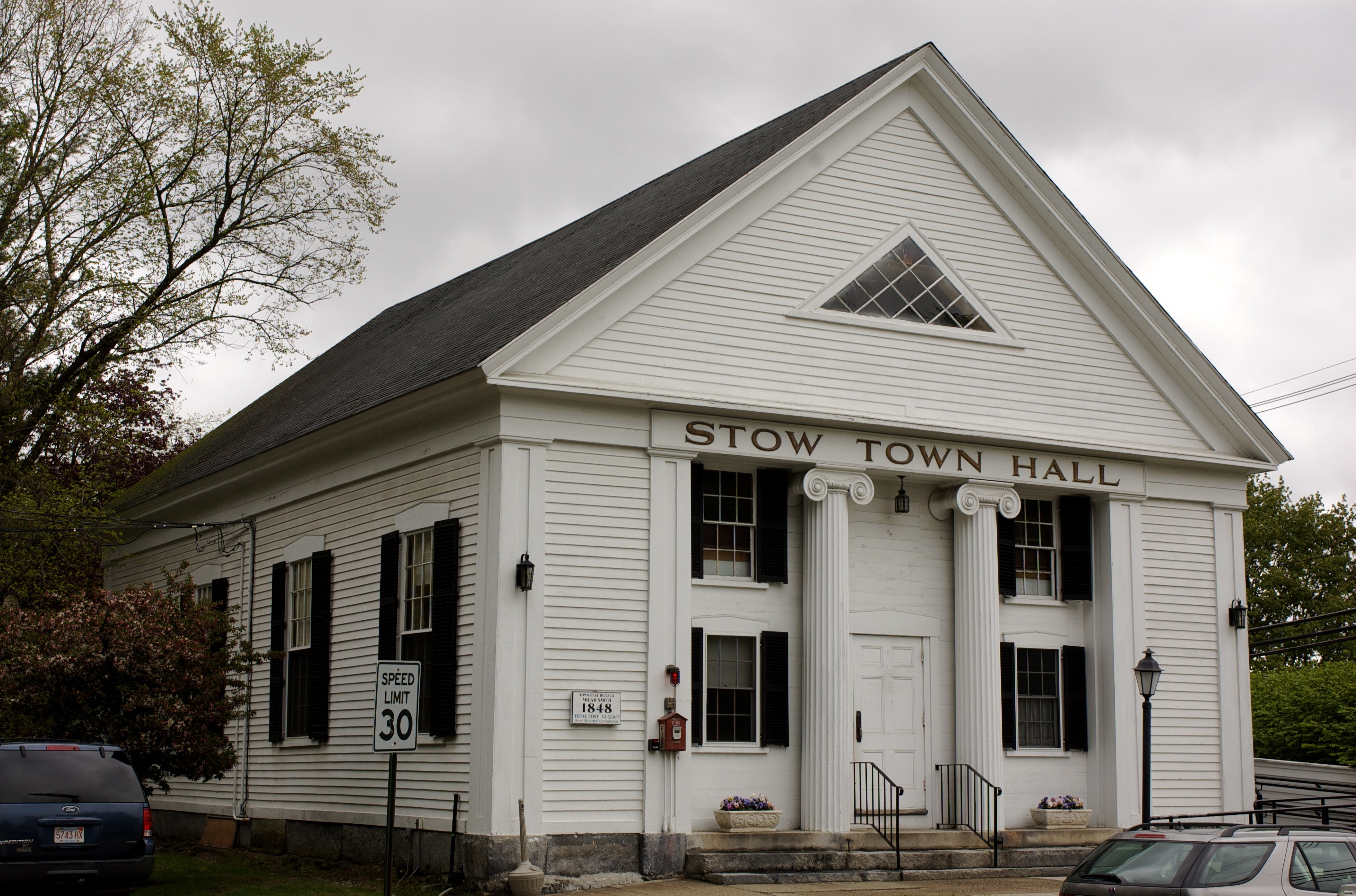
Stow Town Hall

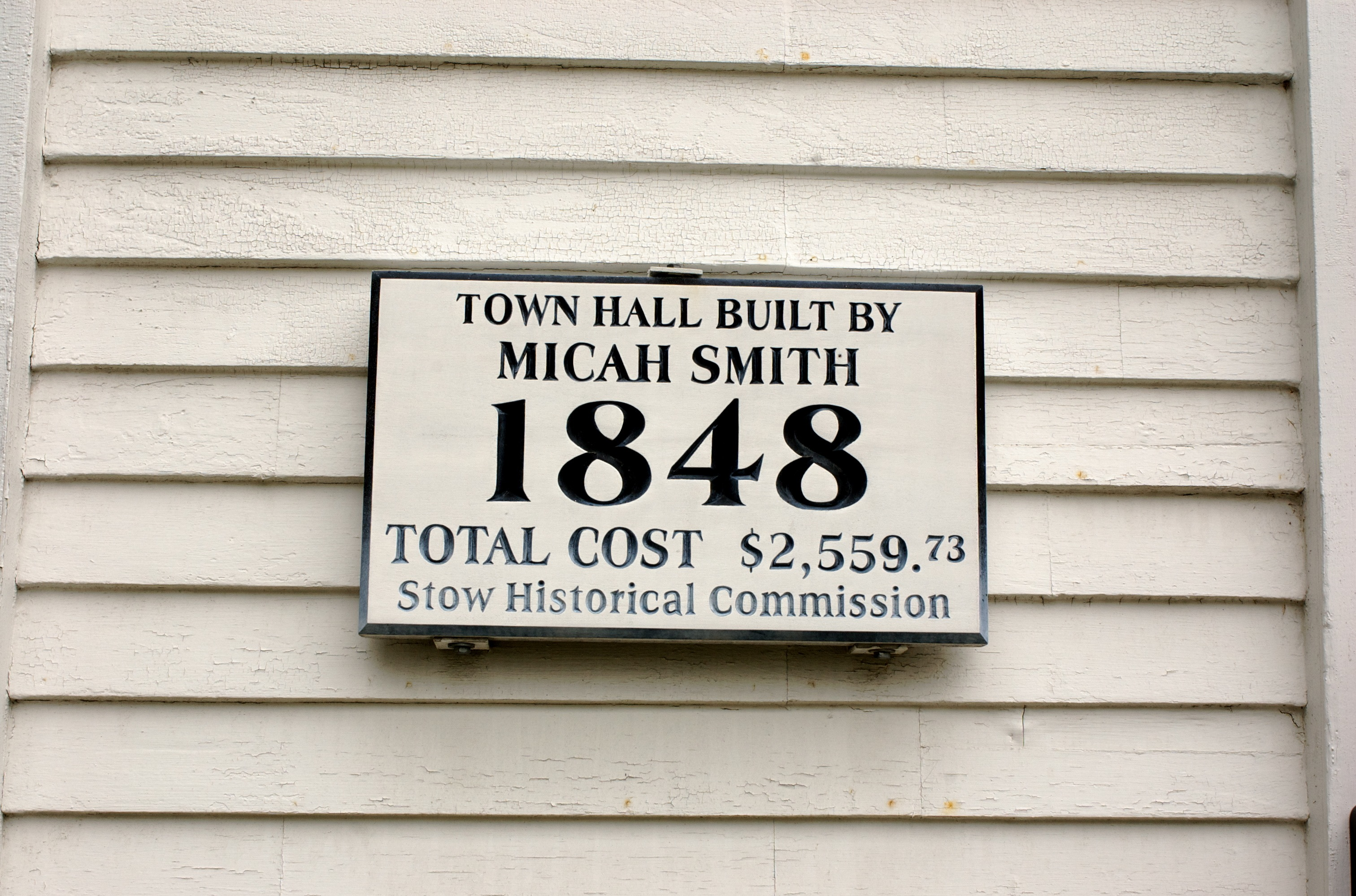
Stow Town Hall historical plaque

=== State and federal government ===
On the federal level, Stow is part of Massachusetts's 3rd congressional district, represented by Lori Trahan. The state's senior (Class I) member of the United States Senate is Elizabeth Warren. The junior (Class II) senator is Ed Markey.

== Schools ==
Stow is a member of the Nashoba Regional School District, also serving the towns of Lancaster and Bolton. Stow is home to The Center School (Pre-K–5) and Hale Middle School (6–8).

Stow also contains the "Stow West School", a one-room schoolhouse that was in operation from 1825–1903.

Pompositticut School (an elementary school, K–3) was converted into a community center in 2017.

=== Masters Academy ===
Masters Academy International, a private multi-sports academy, is a private school tailored specifically for student-athletes, for both boarders and day students. Located on an 82-acre campus that previously held Bose Corporation headquarters, it opened in Stow in September 2026, and is part of Cognita.. The academy was founded by namesake Peter Masters, co-owner of the Boston Junior Bruins, and his brother Chris Masters. USA Fencing announced a move of its official home from Colorado Springs to Stow to make use of the Masters Academy facilities. The facility cost $83.8 million, and received a tax credit of $2.85 million from the Massachusetts Economic Assistance Coordinating Council. Its inaugural class has about 300 students.

== Massachusetts Firefighting Academy ==
Stow is home to the headquarters of the Massachusetts Firefighting Academy, which provides recruit and in-service training for Massachusetts firefighters. The training offered, over 300 courses, is free for cities and towns to access.

== Airports ==
- Minute Man Air Field (6B6) is a privately owned, public-use airport.
- Crow Island Airport is a privately owned airfield for ultralights.
- The Collings Foundation has a small grass airstrip adjacent to their museum.

== Notable people ==
- M. T. Anderson, author primarily of picture books for children and novels for young adults; currently lives in Cambridge, MA
- Ethan Anthony, attended public schools in Stow; architect
- Tom Barrasso, former NHL goaltender, grew up in Stow, played high school hockey for Acton-Boxborough, and went directly from high school to NHL
- Dan Duquette, former general manager of the Montreal Expos and Boston Red Sox; current general manager (2011–present) with the Baltimore Orioles
- Chris Fleming, stand-up comedian and YouTuber
- Henry Gardner Sr., first receiver-general/state treasurer of Massachusetts from 1774 until his death in 1782; his grandson Henry J. Gardner served as governor 1855–1858
- Kate Hogan, Massachusetts state representative for Third Middlesex District since 2009
- Grace Metalious, of Peyton Place fame; her husband taught school in Stow after moving from Gilmanton, New Hampshire, where they had lived while she wrote her book; it is not clear whether she ever lived in Stow, as biographies state that they separated around the time the book was published
- Lee H. Pappas, publisher of high-tech publications, including ANALOG Computing, PC Laptop, VideoGames & Computer Entertainment, and TurboPlay
- Samuel Parris, Puritan minister who preached in Stow during the summer of 1685 and later played a role in the Salem witch trials
- John Witt Randall, poet, naturalist, and art collector
- George P. Shultz, former U.S. secretary of state (1982–1989), lived in Stow when he was teaching at MIT
- Patricia Walrath, former Massachusetts state representative (1985–2009) for Third Middlesex District, before that a Stow selectman
- Austin Warren, literary critic, author, and professor of English
