= Tenney Homestead =

Historic house in Massachusetts, United States

- U.S. National Register of Historic Places
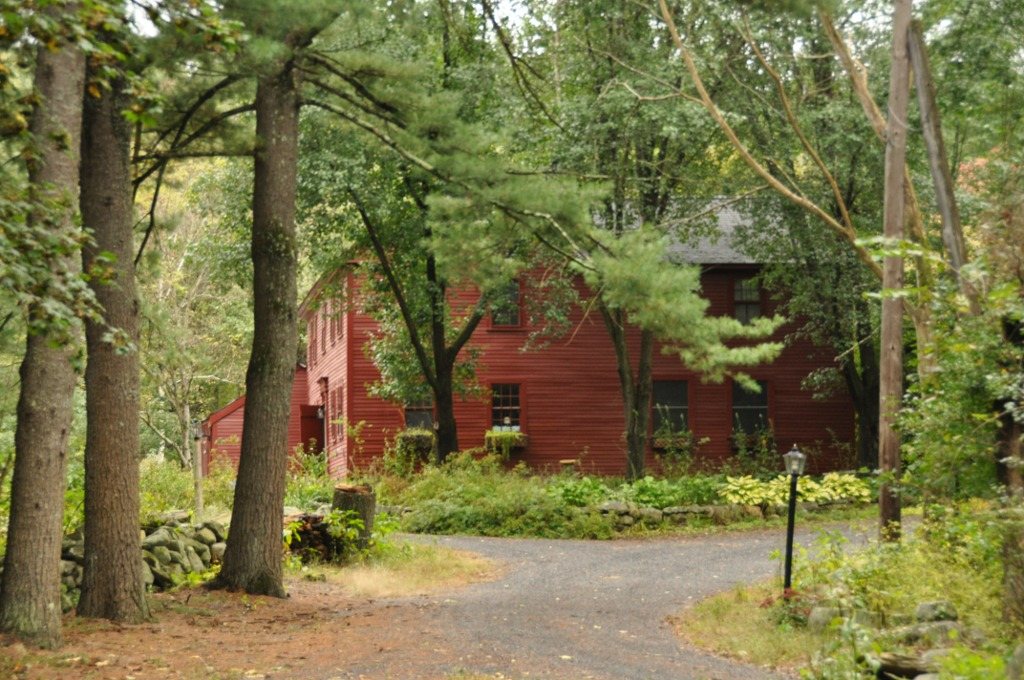

- Location within Massachusetts Location within the United States
- Location: 156 Taylor Road, Stow, Massachusetts
- Coordinates: 42°26′51″N 71°30′52″W
- Architectural style: Colonial
- MPS: First Period Buildings of Eastern Massachusetts TR
- NRHP reference No.: 90000181
- Added to NRHP: March 9, 1990

The Tenney Homestead is a historic First Period house in Stow, Massachusetts. This 2-1/2 story timber frame house dates to the first quarter of the 18th century, and has two distinctive characteristics. The first, its large central chimney, which is stone at its lower levels and brick from the attic up, is one of only a small number of surviving period houses in Middlesex County to use stone. The second is a section of horizontal sheathing that shows evidence of the application of paint by a sponge. The house was associated with the Tenney family from its construction into the 20th century.

The house was listed on the National Register of Historic Places in 1990.

== See also ==
- National Register of Historic Places listings in Middlesex County, Massachusetts
