= Brown–Stow House =

Historic house in Massachusetts, United States

- U.S. National Register of Historic Places
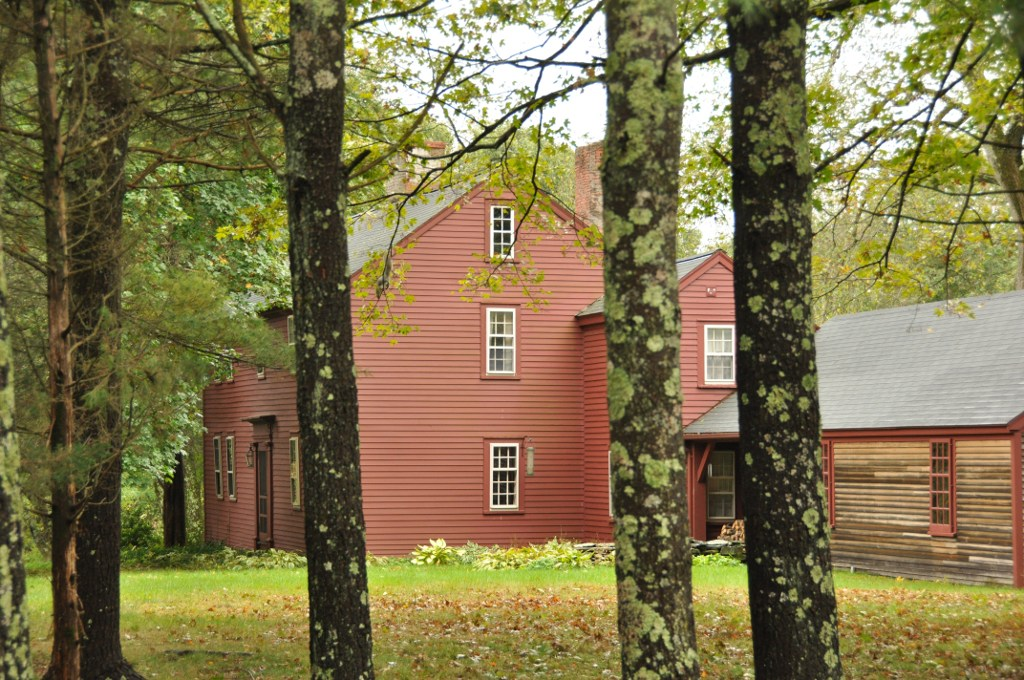

- Location within Massachusetts Location within the United States
- Location: 172 Harvard Road, Stow, Massachusetts
- Coordinates: 42°26′24″N 71°32′12″W
- Architectural style: Colonial
- MPS: First Period Buildings of Eastern Massachusetts TR
- NRHP reference No.: 90000182
- Added to NRHP: March 9, 1990

The Brown–Stow House or Ichabod Stow House is a historic First Period house in Stow, Massachusetts. The oldest portion of this two-story timber-frame house was probably built early in the 18th century, and consisted of a single "cell" three bays wide, two stories high, with what is now the central chimney in a side bay. During the 18th century it was expanded twice, adding a second cell (giving it the classic five-bay facade) and a rear leanto (giving it the classic saltbox appearance). It has had two modest 20th century additions. The house underwent a major restoration in the 1950s to return it to an 18th-century appearance. The house was probably built by Boaz Brown, who acquired the property in 1699 and died in 1711.

The house was listed on the National Register of Historic Places in 1990.

== See also ==
- National Register of Historic Places listings in Middlesex County, Massachusetts
