= Lake Boon =

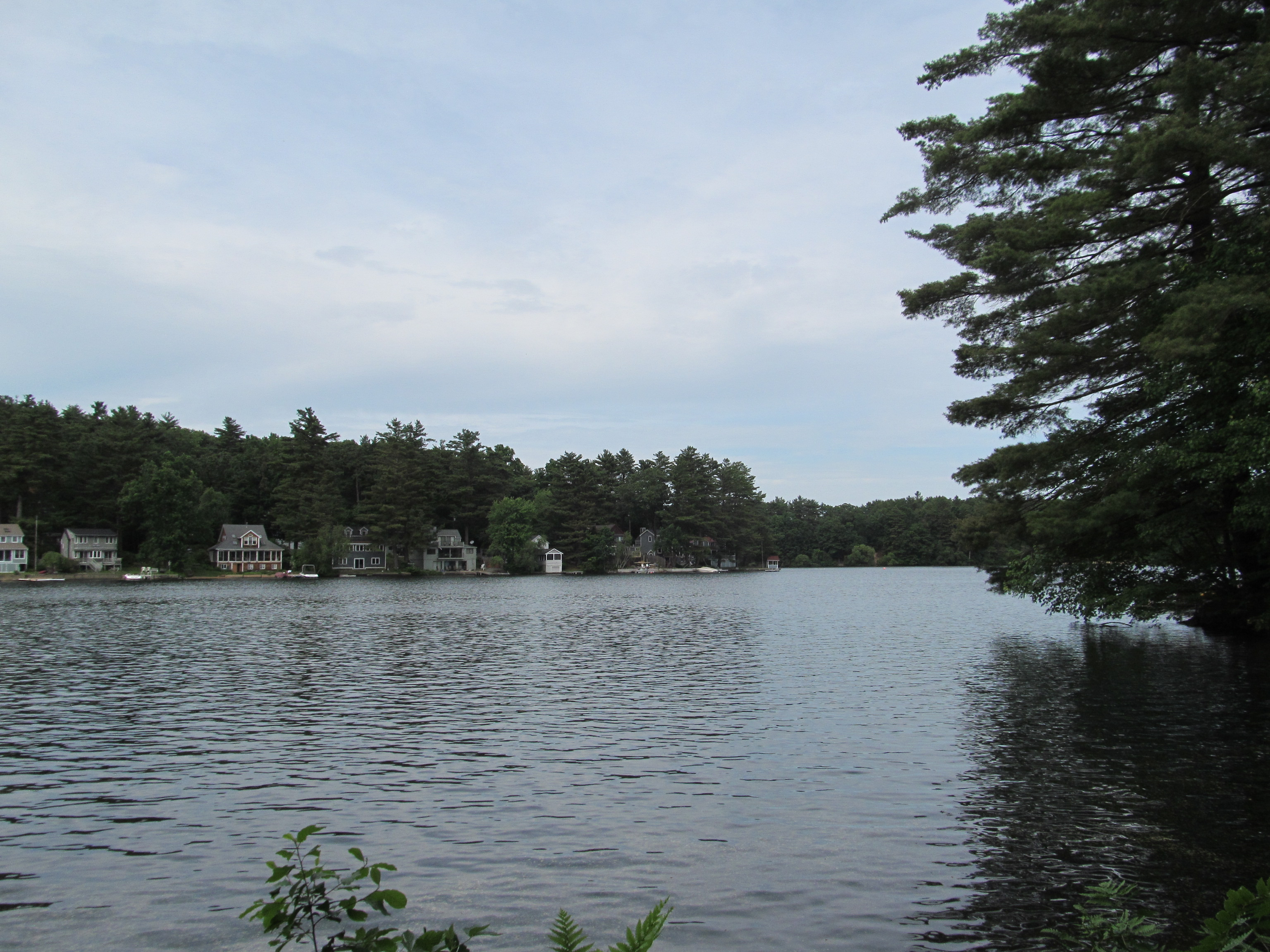
- Lake Boon

- Location within Massachusetts Location within the United States
- Location: Middlesex County, Massachusetts, U.S.
- Coordinates: 42°24′11″N 71°30′05″W
- Type: Reservoir
- Primary outflows: Assabet River
- Catchment area: 1,690 acres (680 ha)
- Basin countries: United States
- Max. length: 1.5 mi (2.4 km)
- Surface area: 163 acres (66 ha)
- Average depth: 11 ft (3.4 m)
- Max. depth: 23 ft (7.0 m)
- Surface elevation: 187 ft (57 m)
- Settlements: Stow; Hudson

Lake Boon is a lake in eastern Massachusetts covering about 163 acres (66 ha) in the towns of Stow and Hudson, Massachusetts. The lake is approximately 1.5 miles (2.4 km) long and consists of four basins connected by narrows. The first and largest basin at the north-west end of the lake stretches from a dam along Barton Road in Stow down to narrows just above the towns south border. It is the only part of the lake that is completely within Stow. The second basin is about half the size of the first and straddles the border with Hudson. The 3rd and 4th basins at the eastern end of the lake are much smaller and less easily navigable due to shallow waters and significant plant-growth.

Maximum depth of the first basin is approximately 23 ft (7.0 m), making it the deepest part of the lake. At their deepest points the second basin is about 10 ft (3.0 m), the third basin is about 7 ft (2.1 m), and the fourth basin is only 4 ft (1.2 m) deep.

Lake Boon serves as an important part of the Stow and Hudson communities, with residences built around most of the shoreline. There is one semi-public beach, Pine Bluffs, located in Stow on the north-east edge of first basin. In the summer it provides a place for camps and swim lessons and has a few basic amenities like picnic tables and grills. Use of the Pine Bluff Beach requires either a day-pass which can only be purchased by local residents or a season-pass that is available to the wider public.

== History ==
Part of the lake was originally "Boon's Pond" which was named after Matthew Boon, an explorer from Charlestown, Massachusetts, who came to the area in 1660. He was the first of two settlers in Stow and was supposedly killed by Native Americans near the Lake on February 14, 1676. A monument was erected in 1883 as a memorial to Boon.

The extents of Boon Pond were originally entirely within the first basin of present-day Lake Boon. In 1847 the water rights to Boon Pond were purchased by Amory Maynard and a dam was built to increase the size of the pond, leading local residents to start referring to it as a lake. The intent was to add to the water reserve needed for powering the Assabet Woolen Mill, in the town of Maynard. At first, the extents of the pond increased with spring melt and decreased as water was let out during the summer months. Once the woolen mill converted to coal-fired power the need for Lake Boon's water was ended, and a more permanent water level was established. The expansion went into the Ramshorn Meadow and the Ramshorn Swamp. The meadow area is now known as the second basin, while the swamp area is known as the third and fourth basins.

Lake Boon became a popular summer vacationing spot towards the end of 19th century. It was accessible by two railroad lines that ran through the adjacent communities. These railroad lines came out of Boston, giving residents of the city easy access. At this time Lake Boon had a hotel, many clubs, two post offices, churches, and stores around the edges of the lake. In order to get from the railroad stops to the lake's most popular locations, a ferry service was started around 1900 that sailed between Whitman's Crossing near the Sudbury Rd bridge in Stow and the Ordway Station in Hudson. The first steamship was named Cleo and ran until 1910, when a gas-powered ferry called the Princess replaced it. The mass adoption of automobiles in the mid-20th century made it easier for people to travel longer distances to other destinations, decreasing tourism to Lake Boon. Eventually, this settling of activity on and around the lake made way for permanent residents to live there. With the lack of visitors and increase in residents, the hotel was shut down.

=== Henry David Thoreau's visit ===
On September 4, 1851, Thoreau created a journal entry entitled "A Walk to Boon's Pond in Stow". It begins: "Sept. 4. 8 A. M. A clear and pleasant day after the rain. Start for Boon's Pond in Stow with C." [William Ellery Channing]. The 2,800-word entry for that day mostly covers his trip and experiences surrounding the pond rather than going into details about the pond itself. The relevant portion:

And now we leave the road and go through the woods and swamps toward Boon's Pond, crossing two or three roads and by Potter's house in Stow; still on east of river... Part of it called Boon's Plain. Boon said to have lived on or under Bailey's Hill at west of pond. Killed by Indians between Boon's and White's Pond as he was driving his ox-cart. The oxen ran off to Marlborough garrison-house. His remains have been searched for. A sandy plain, a large level tract. The pond shores handsome enough, but water shallow and muddy looking. Well-wooded shores. The maples begin to show red about it. Much fished.

== Related organizations ==
There are a handful of local organizations associated with Lake Boon. The most notable of these are the Lake Boon Association (LBA) which was incorporated in 1921 and the Lake Boon Commission (LBC) which was created in 1941. The LBA was founded by local residents with a focus on community and environmental activities where as the LBC is a state-controlled body created to regulate activates on and around the lake. Some past organizations that have since been disbanded include the Lake Boon Quality Assurance Team (LBQAT), appointed by the LBC in 2002 to oversee disbursement of a 'DEM Lakes and Ponds' grant, and Friends of Lake Boon (FLB), an environmental group existing until 2003 concerned with addressing certain ecological issues.

== References and further reading ==
- Halprin, Lewis and Alan Kattelle. (1998). Lake Boon, Images of America. Mount Pleasant, SC: Arcadia Publishing. ISBN 0-7385-6436-2
- Halprin, Lewis and Alan Kattelle. (2005). Lake Boon, Postcard History Series. Mount Pleasant, SC: Arcadia Publishing. ISBN 0-7385-3758-6
