= Summer Hill (Maynard, Massachusetts) =

Hill in Massachusetts, United States

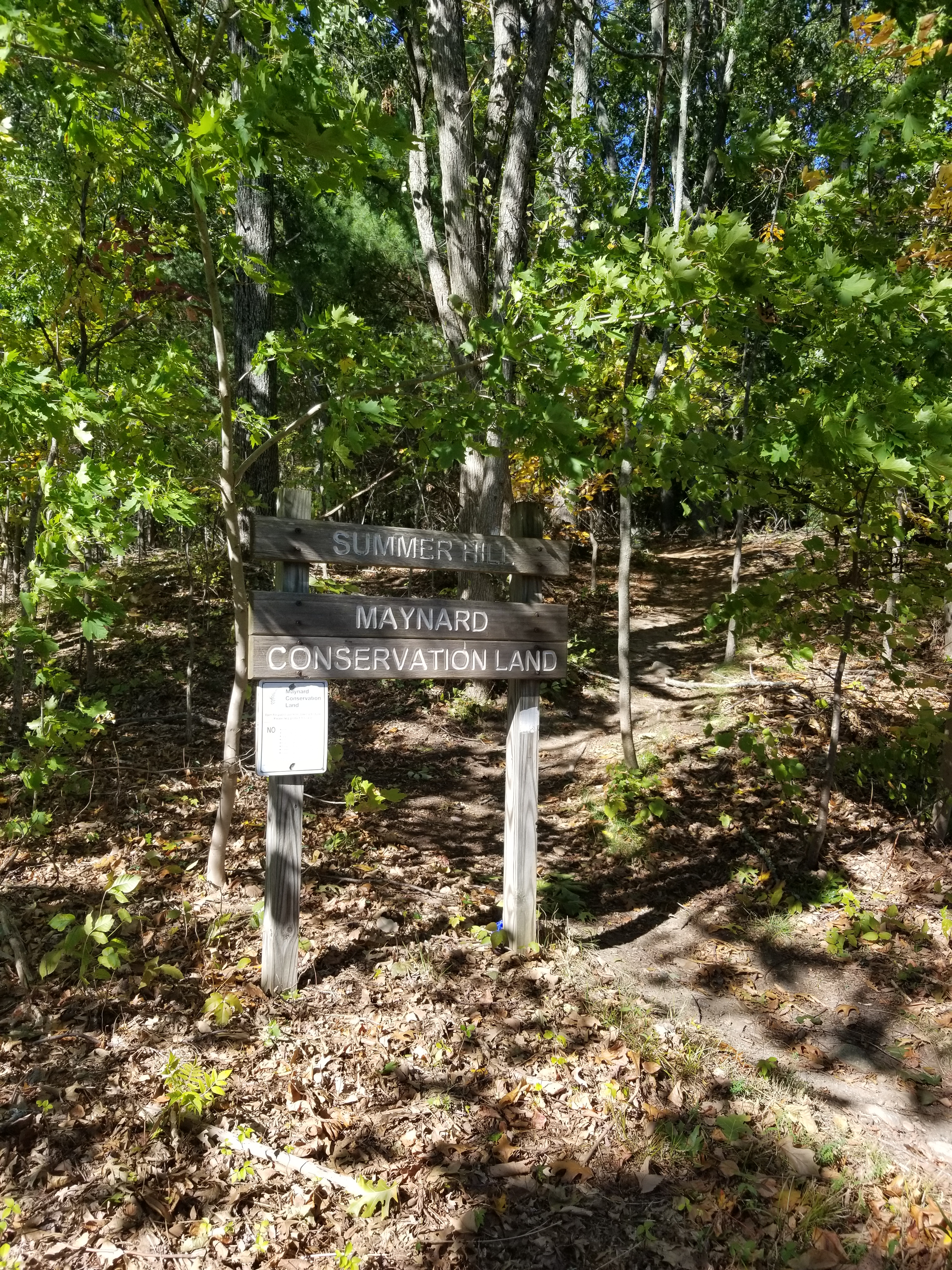
- Summer Hill Conservation Land trailhead on Summer Hill Road

Highest point
- Elevation: 348 ft (106 m)
- Prominence: 250 ft
- Coordinates: 42°26′00″N 71°28′13″W

Naming
- English translation: land of many hills

Geography
- Location: Maynard, Massachusetts, United States

Climbing
- Easiest route: Summer Hill Conservation Land paths

Summer Hill (also known as Pompasitticut or Pomciticut) is a 351-foot (107 m) hill overlooking the Assabet River in Maynard, Massachusetts "with a gradual slope to the north and west". Today the hill is largely conservation land with 24 acres of public hiking trails, and the summit of the hill also contains a radio tower and the town's steel and concrete water tanks. It is the highest point in Maynard.

== History ==
Native Americans referred to both the hill and region as "Pompasitticut" (land of many hills). In the 1660s early settler John Kettell likely lived "in the vicinity of Pompassiticutt Hill, on land now included in Maynard" before the warfare of King Philip's War caused him to flee at the time of the Lancaster raid. In 1676 during King Philip's War, Native Americans purportedly gathered on Pompasitticut Hill "near the spot where the remains of the foundation are" to plan their attack on Sudbury.

From 1683 to 1871 the hill was part of Stow before Maynard was incorporated and "was the town's common land" and a pasture for many years. The Gibson family owned a large farm on the hill from the 1720s to 1823, and in 1826 the Maynards, distant cousins of Amory Maynard, purchased the farm which was "known as the Summer hill farm on the south side of Pomposetticutt hill" where many "Indian relics [had] been picked up," and Lucius H. Maynard acquired "a large collection." On April 18, 1859 Henry David Thoreau surveyed a woodlot near the hill for a sale to Sumner Blood," and in his treatise about wild blueberries Thoreau wrote about how "Mr. Blood cut off his woodlot on Pomciticut Hill winter before last" which "deforms a hillside" but "all the villagers obtain compensation in the crop of berries that it yields."

In 1871 Maynard became an independent town, and hosted a celebration where several citizens "raise[d] a flag staff on Pompsiticut hill." By at least 1891 the north and west sides of the hill contained "excellent orchard and plow-lands"and the south side contained "a fertile valley and many broad acres of fine pasturage," and on the summit there was at that time a reservoir (built in 1888) and an unobstructed view to Mount Wachusett and Mount Monadnock in New Hampshire. Erickson's Dairy (1937) originally used milk from their cows which grazed on Summer Hill behind the dairy building and ice cream stand.

In the early twentieth century, developers planned several subdivisions for the undeveloped land on Summer Hill, which never came to fruition, and in 1979 the Conservation Commission purchased a large portion of the land on Summer Hill to preserve as open space. Summer Hill now has public hiking trails with trailheads on both Summer Street and Summer Hill Road near the Conservation Land signs.

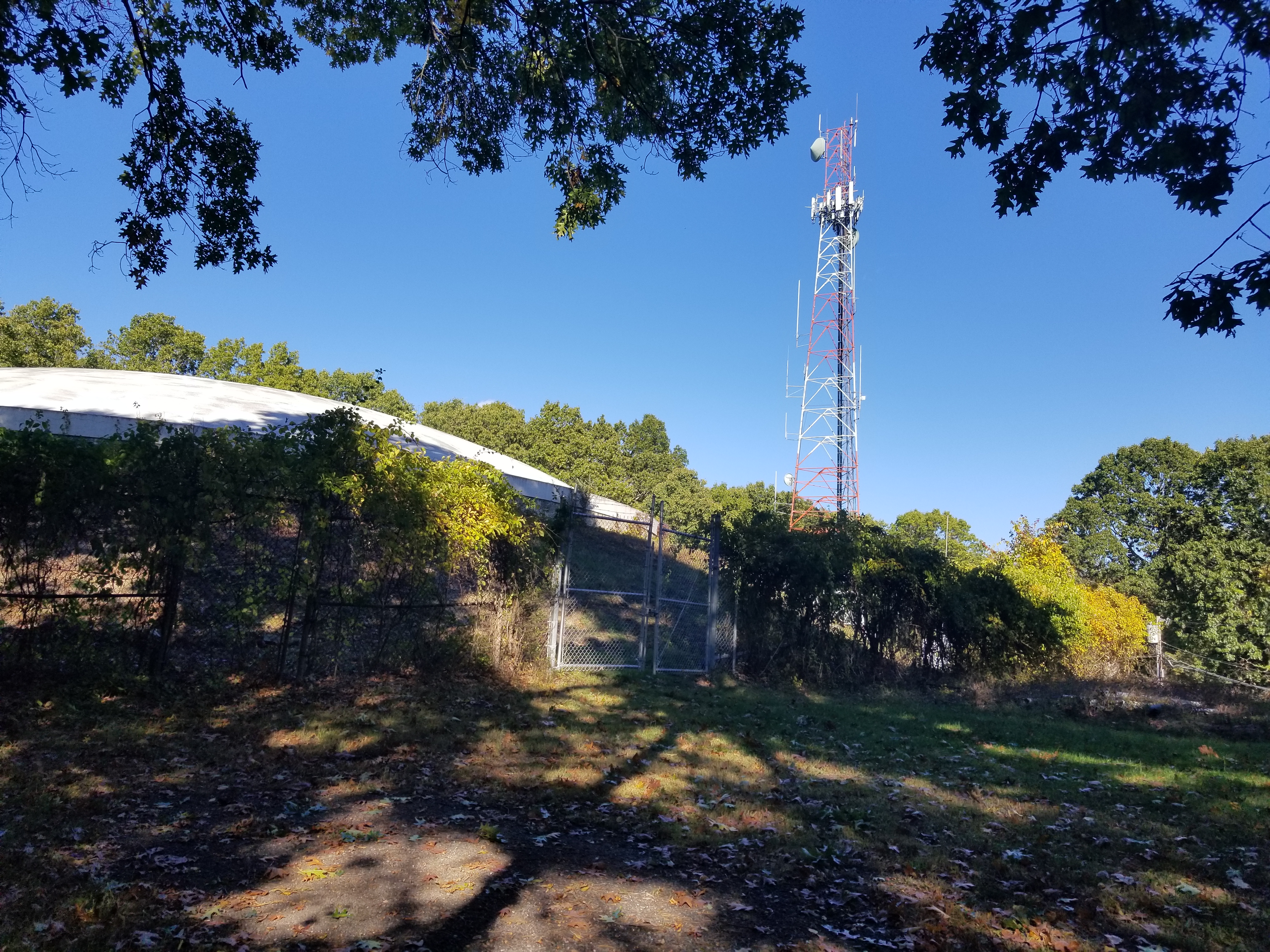
Concrete water tank and radio antenna at summit

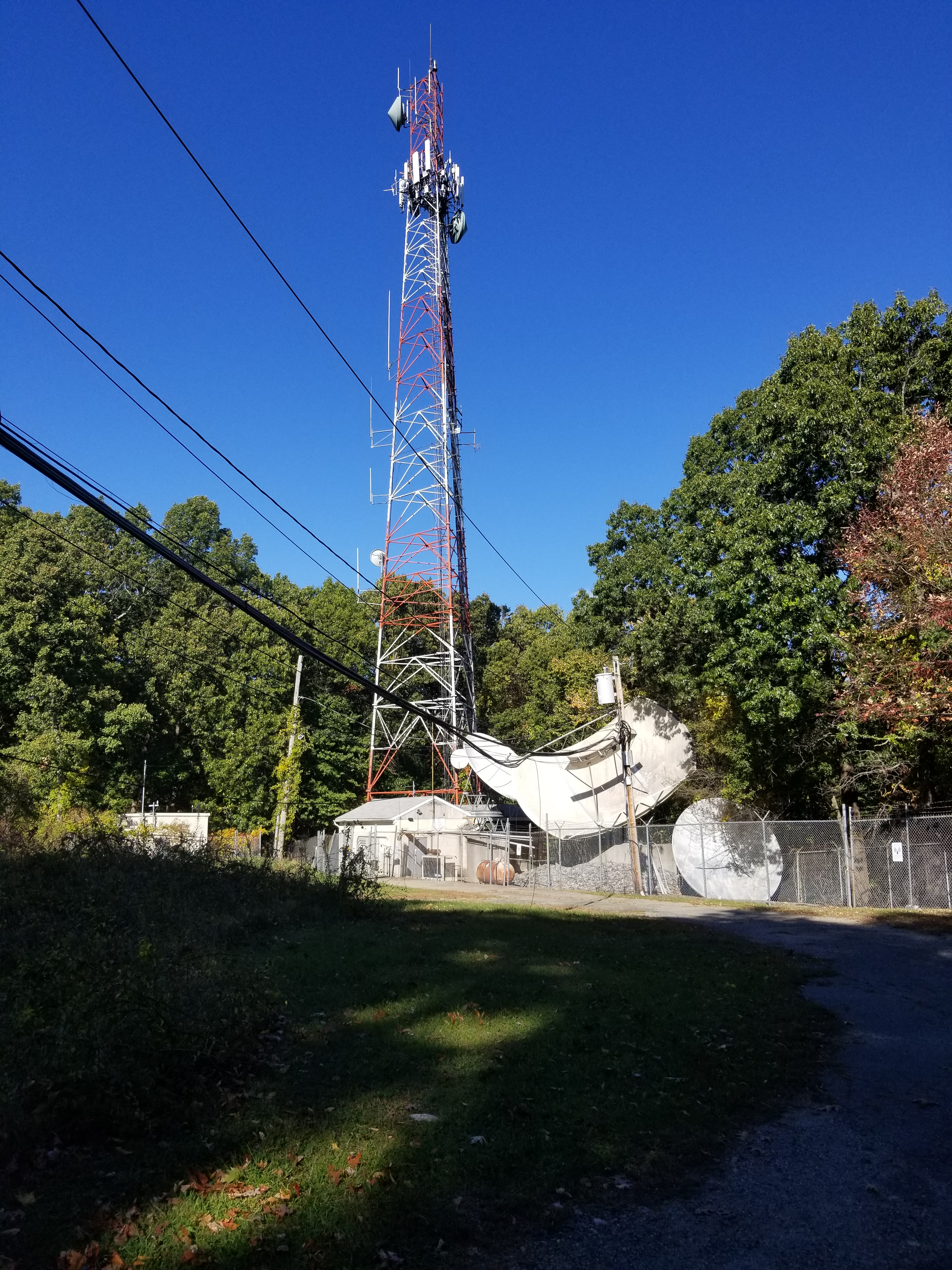
Radio antenna at summit

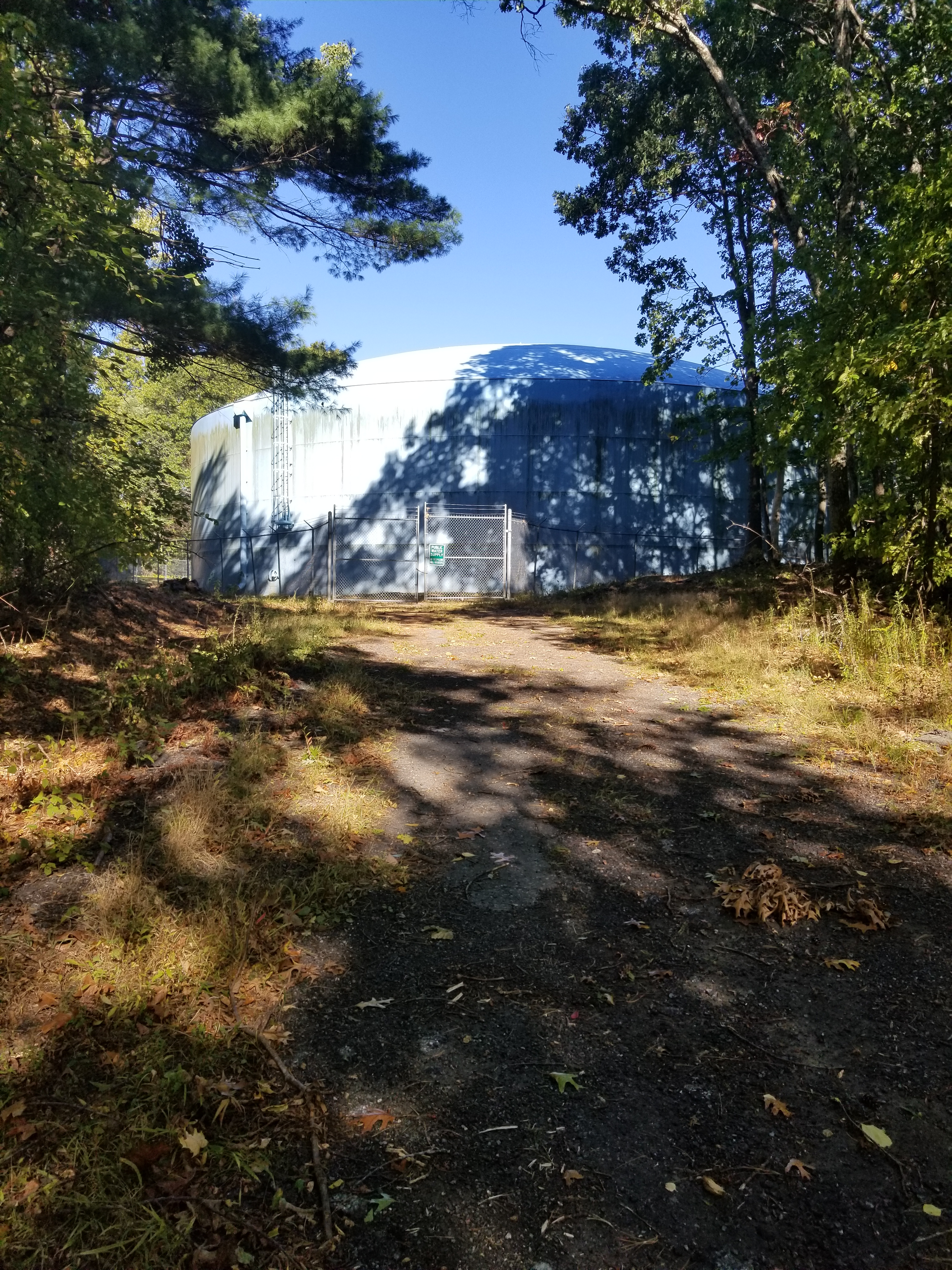
Steel water tower supply tank at summit

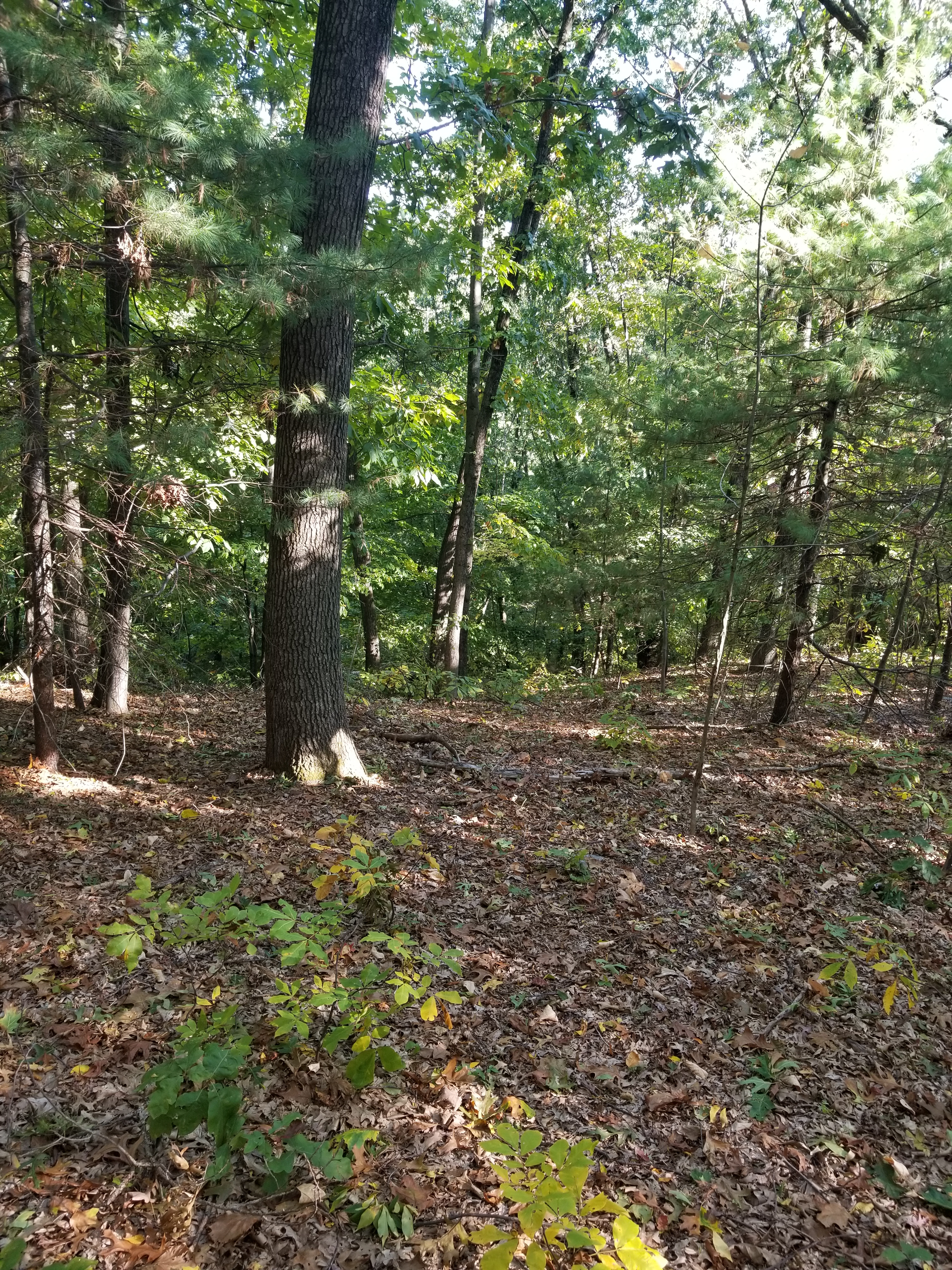
Summer Hill conservation land looking toward downtown Maynard

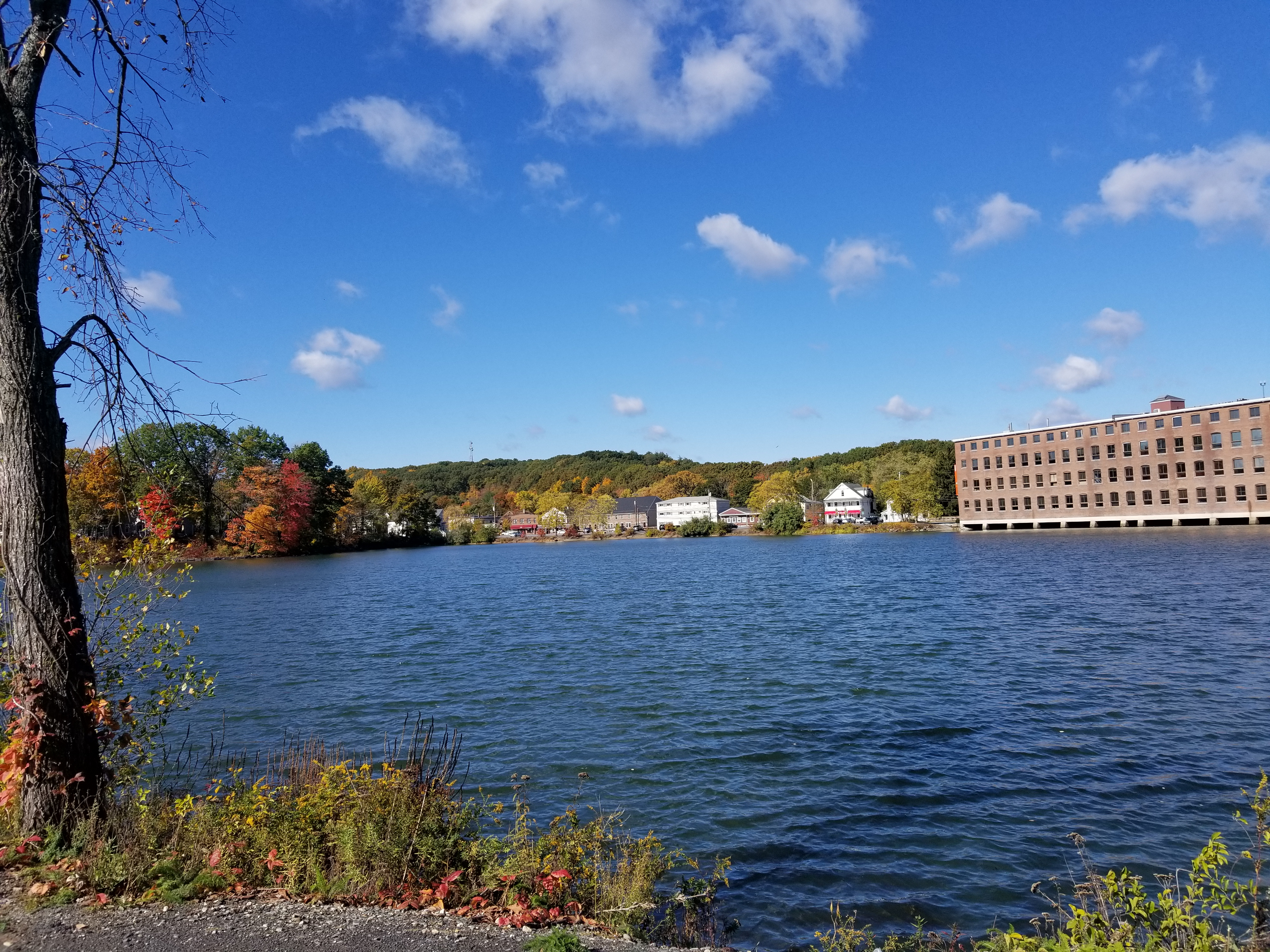
Mill Pond with Summer Hill in background

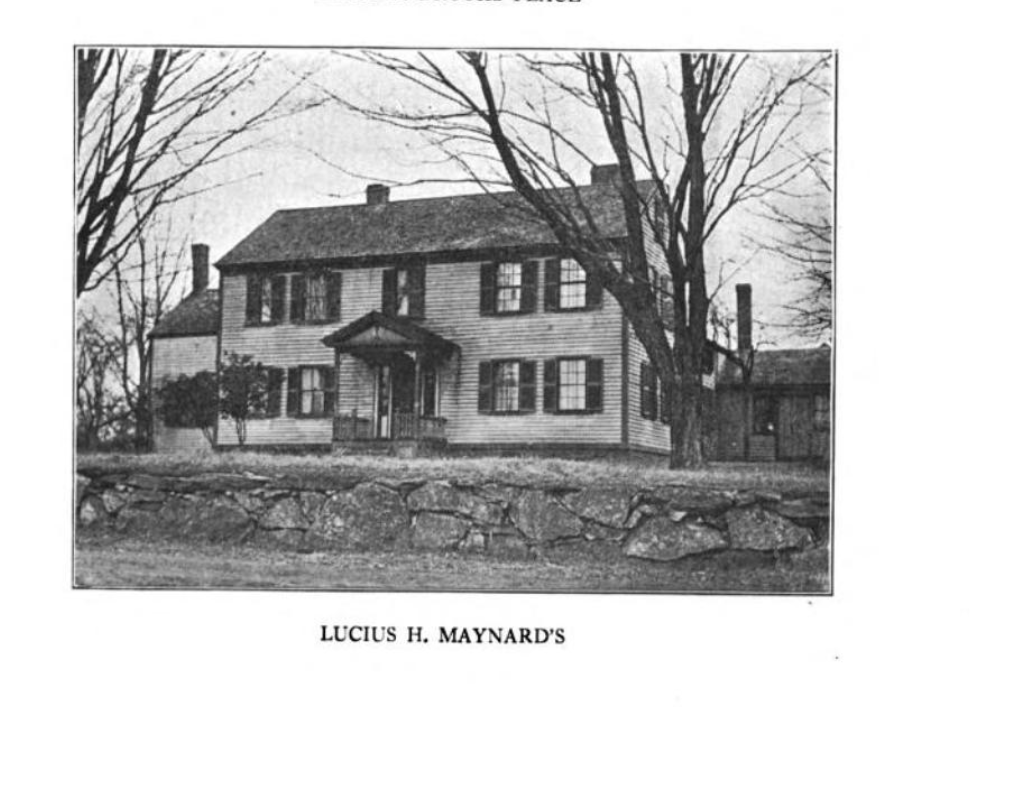
Lucius H. Maynard House, circa 1921, on Summer Street

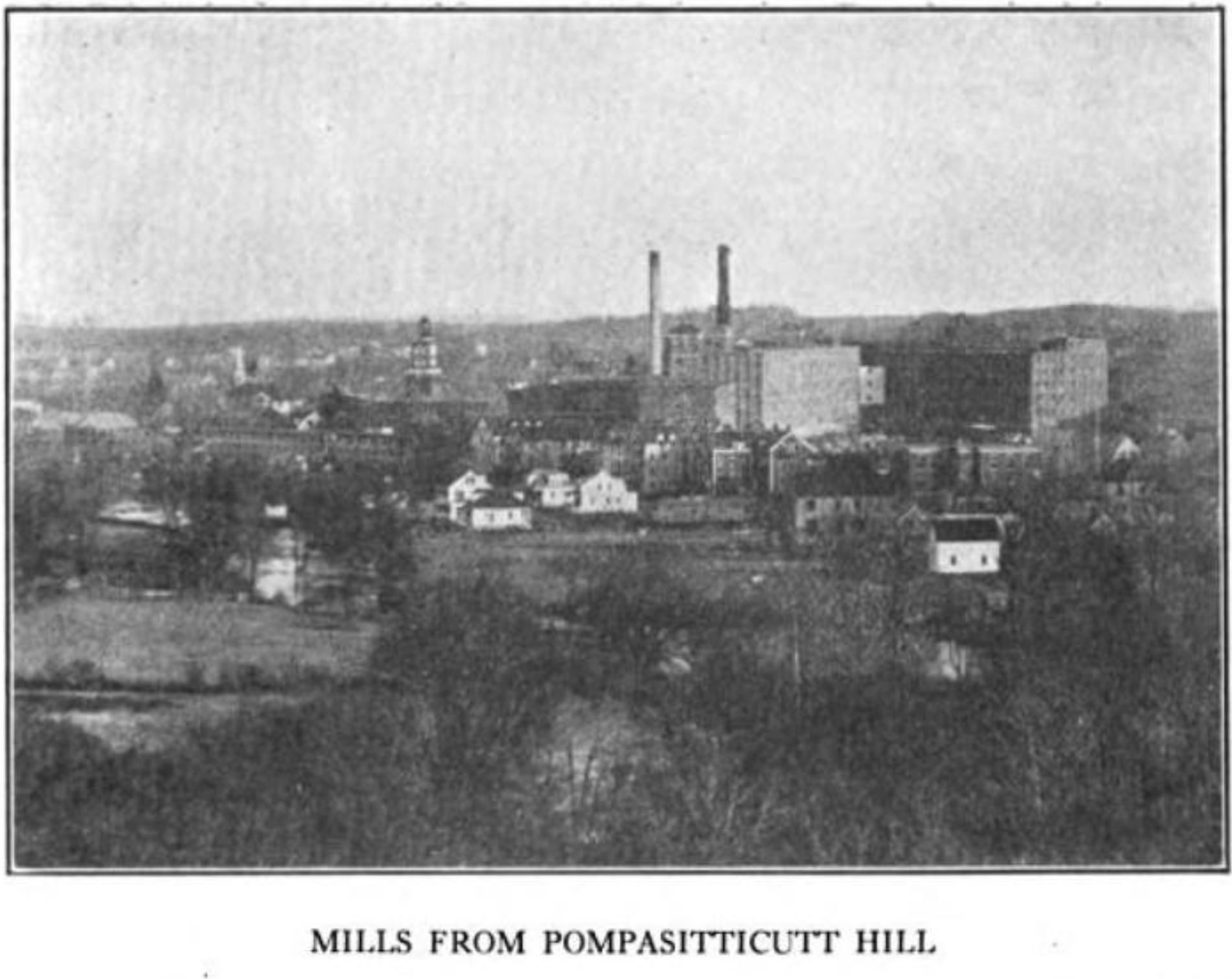
View from Pompasitticutt Hill toward Maynard's mills in 1921
