= Hudson, Massachusetts =

Town in Massachusetts, United States

- Town
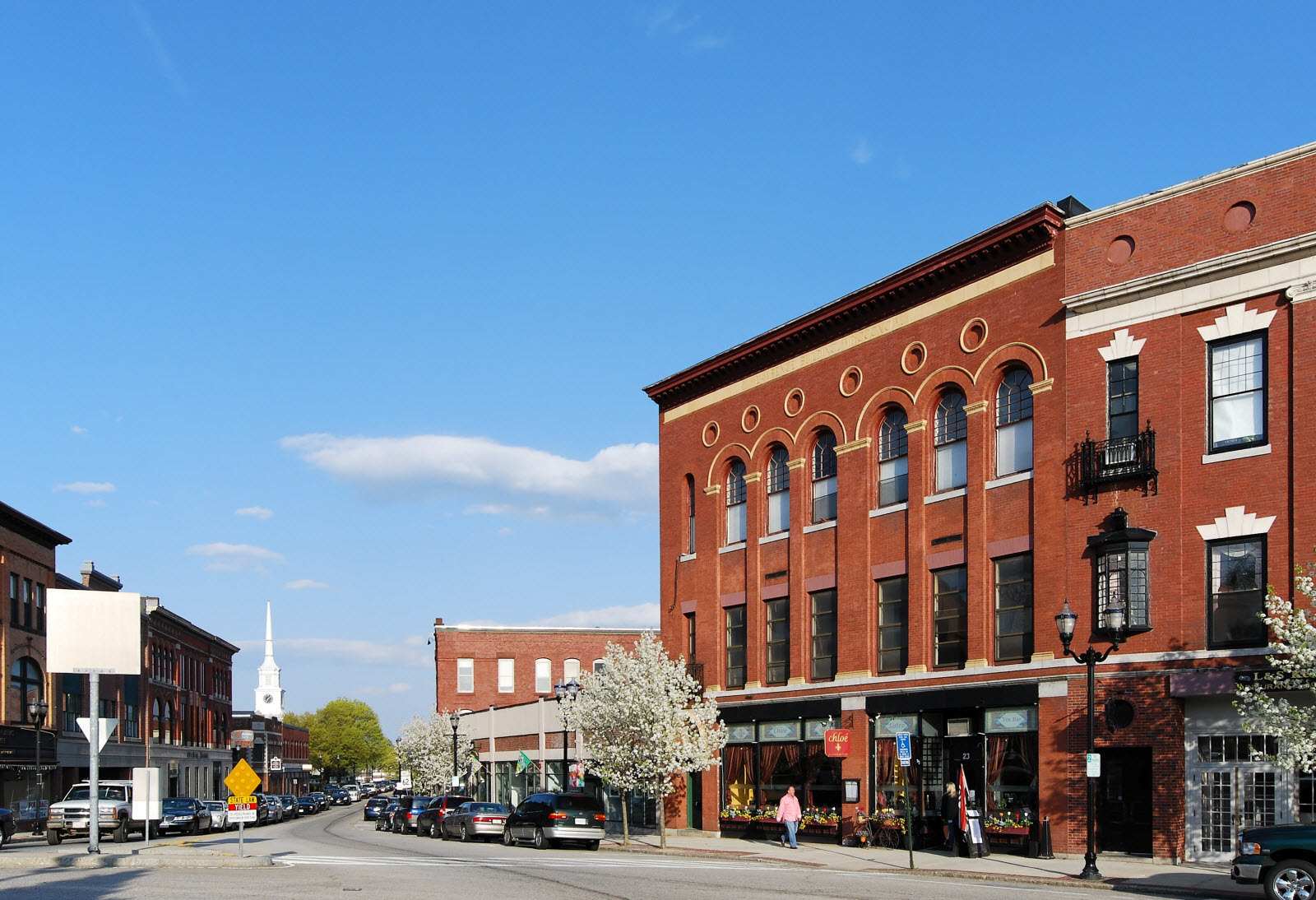
- Wood Square

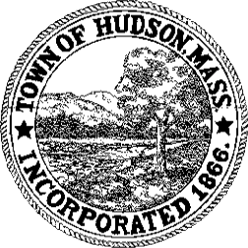
- Seal

- Location in Middlesex County in Massachusetts
- Coordinates: 42°23′30″N 71°34′00″W
- Country: United States
- State: Massachusetts
- County: Middlesex
- Settled: 1698
- Incorporated: 1866

Government
  - Type: Open town meeting
  - Town Manager: Thomas Gregory
  - Select Board: Scott R. Duplisea; Judy Congdon; Diane G. Bemis; James D. Quinn; Steven C. Sharek

Area
  - Total: 11.9 sq mi (30.7 km^{2})
  - Land: 11.5 sq mi (29.8 km^{2})
  - Water: 0.35 sq mi (0.9 km^{2})
- Elevation: 260 ft (80 m)

Population (2020)
  - Total: 20,092
  - Density: 1,746/sq mi (674.2/km^{2})
- Time zone: UTC−5 (Eastern)
  - Summer (DST): UTC−4 (Eastern)
- ZIP Code: 01749
- Area code: 351/978
- FIPS code: 25-31540
- Website: www.townofhudson.org

Hudson is a town in Middlesex County, Massachusetts, United States, with a total population of 20,092 as of the 2020 census. It contains the census-designated place of the same name. Before its incorporation as a town in 1866, Hudson was a neighborhood and unincorporated village of Marlborough, Massachusetts, and was known as Feltonville. From approximately 1850 until the last shoe factory burned down in 1968, Hudson was a mill town specializing in the production of shoes and related products. At one point, the town had 17 shoe factories, many of them powered by the Assabet River, which runs through town. The many factories in Hudson attracted immigrants from Canada and Europe. Today most residents are of either Portuguese or Irish descent, with a smaller percentage being of French, Italian, English, or Scotch-Irish descent. While some manufacturing remains in Hudson, the town is now primarily residential. Hudson is served by the Hudson Public Schools district.

== History ==
=== Pre-European and colonial ===
Indigenous people lived in what became central Massachusetts for thousands of years prior to European settlement. Indigenous oral histories, archaeological evidence, and European settler documents attest to historic settlements of the Nipmuc people in present-day Hudson and the surrounding area. Nipmuc settlements along the Assabet River intersected with the territories of three other related Algonquian-speaking peoples: the Massachusett, Pennacook, and Wampanoag.

In 1650, the area that would become Hudson and Marlborough was part of the Ockookangansett Indian Plantation for the Praying Indians. During King Philip's War, English settlers forcibly evicted the Indians from their plantation, imprisoning and killing many of them; most survivors did not return after the conflict. The first recorded European settlement of the Hudson area occurred in 1698 or 1699 when settler John Barnes was granted 1 acre (0.40 ha) of Indian lands straddling both banks of the Assabet River. Barnes built a gristmill on the Assabet River's north bank on land that would one day be part of Hudson. In 1699 or 1700 Barnes sold his gristmill to Joseph Howe, who built a sawmill and bridge across the Assabet. Other early settlers include Jeremiah Barstow, who built a house near today's Wood Square in central Hudson, and Robert Barnard, who purchased the house from Barstow. The area became known as Howe's Mills, Barnard's Mills, or simply The Mills throughout the 1700s.

The settlement was originally part of the town of Marlborough. In June 1743, area residents Samuel Witt, John Hapgood, and others petitioned to break away from Marlborough and become a separate town, claiming the journey to attend Marlborough's town meeting was "vastly fatiguing." Their petition was denied by the Massachusetts General Court. Samuel Witt later served on committees of correspondence during the 1760s. At least nine men from the area fought with the Minutemen on April 19, 1775, as they harassed British troops along the route to Boston.

=== 18th century ===
The area established itself as an early industrial center. Business partners Phineas Sawyer and Jedediah Wood built a sawmill on Tannery Brook, a tributary stream of the Assabet River today crossed by Main Street, in the mid-1700s. This was followed by another mill on the Assabet in 1788 and a blacksmith's forge in 1790. Joel Cranston opened a pub and general store—the settlement's first—in 1794. Silas Felton (1776–1828) arrived in the settlement in 1799, joining Cranston in business: it was not long before the area became known as Feltonville.

=== 19th century ===
Feltonville's—and later Hudson's—significant role in the shoe industry may trace its origins to Daniel Stratton. A shoemaker, Stratton opened his Feltonville shop in 1816, expanding it to a small factory on Washington Street in 1821.

In the 1850s, Feltonville received its first railroads. There were two Feltonville train stations, originally operated by the Massachusetts Central Railroad and the Fitchburg Railroad, later the Central Massachusetts Railroad Company, and later by Boston & Maine, until both were closed in 1965. Railroads allowed the development of larger factories, some of the first in the country to use steam power and sewing machines. By 1860, Feltonville had 17 shoe and shoe-related factories, which attracted Irish and French Canadian immigrants.

Feltonville residents fought for the Union during the American Civil War. Twenty-five of those men died doing so. Two existing houses—the Goodale Homestead on Chestnut Street (Hudson's oldest surviving building, dating from 1702) and the Curley home on Brigham Street (formerly known as the Rice Farm)—have been cited as waystations on the Underground Railroad.

On May 16, 1865, Feltonville residents once again petitioned to become a separate town. They cited the difficulty of attending town meeting, as their predecessors had in 1743, and also noted that Marlborough's high school was too far for most Feltonville children to practicably attend. This petition was approved by the Massachusetts General Court on March 16, 1866. A committee suggested naming the new town Hudson after Congressman Charles Hudson, who was born and raised in the Feltonville neighborhood. By his own account, in response to this honor, Charles Hudson offered to donate $500 (~$10,994 in 2025) towards establishing a free public library. Town citizens gratefully voted to accept Congressman Hudson's gift.

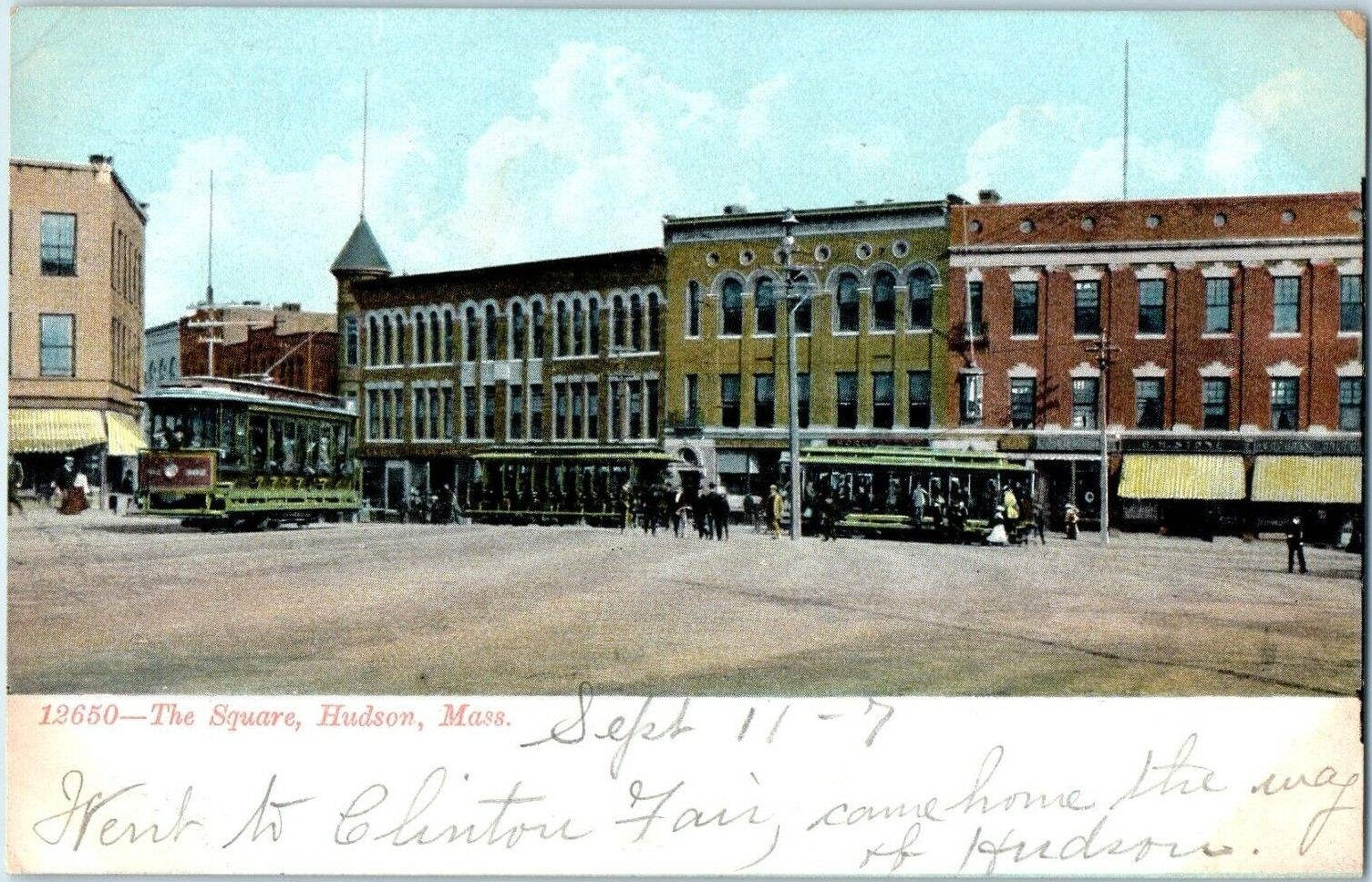
Wood Square in 1907

Over the next twenty years, Hudson grew as several industries settled in town. Two woolen mills, an elastic-webbing plant, a piano case factory, and a factory for waterproofing fabrics by rubber coating were constructed. Private banks, five schools, a poor farm, and the current town hall were also built during this time. The population hovered around 4,000 residents, most of whom lived in modest houses with small backyard gardens. Some of Hudson's wealthier citizens built elaborate Queen Anne Victorian mansions, and many of them still exist. One of the finest is the 1895 Colonel Adelbert Mossman House on Park Street, which is on the National Register of Historic Places.

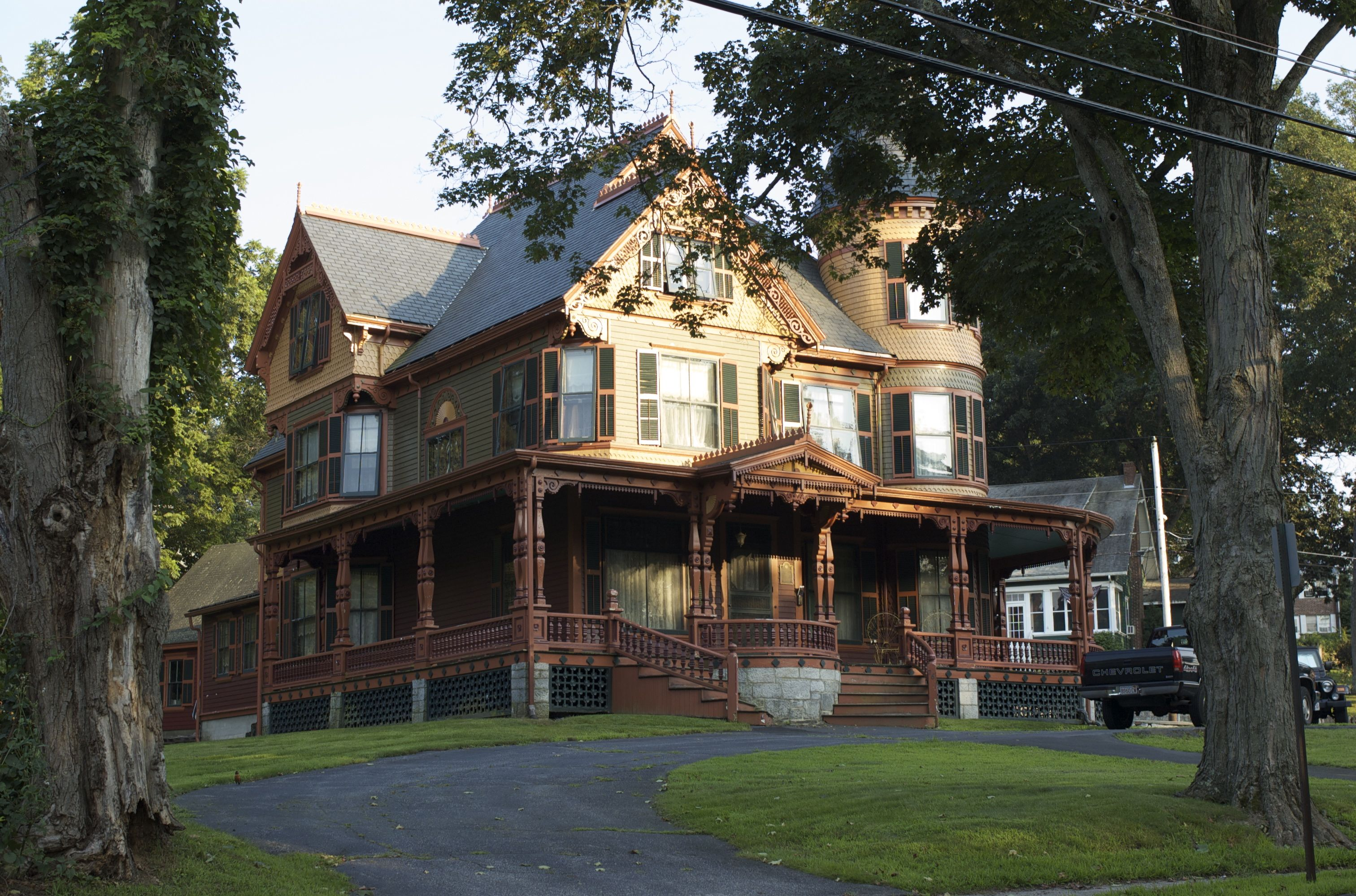
Colonel Adelbert Mossman House

The town maintained five volunteer fire companies during the 1880s and 1890s, one of which manned the Eureka Hand Pump, a record-setting pump that could shoot a 1.5-inch (38 mm) stream of water 229 feet (70 m). Despite this glut of fire companies, on July 4, 1894, two boys playing with firecrackers started a fire that burned down 40 buildings and 5 acres (20,000 m^{2}) of central Hudson. Nobody was hurt, but the damages were estimated at $400,000 in 1894 (the equivalent of approximately $11.1 million in 2018). The town was substantially rebuilt within a year or two.

=== 20th century ===
By 1900, Hudson's population reached about 5,500 residents and the town had built a power plant on Cherry Street. Many houses were wired for electricity, and to this day Hudson produces its own power under the auspices of the Hudson Light and Power Department, a non-profit municipal utility owned by the town. The brick Hudson Armory building accommodating local Massachusetts militia, and later units of the Massachusetts National Guard, opened in 1910. Electric trolley lines were built connecting Hudson with the towns of Leominster, Concord, and Marlborough, though these only remained in existence until the late 1920s. The factories in town continued to grow, attracting immigrants from England, Germany, Portugal, Lithuania, Poland, Greece, Albania, and Italy. By 1928 nineteen languages were spoken by the workers of the Firestone-Apsley Rubber Company. These immigrants usually lived in boarding houses near their places of employment. In 1926 Hudson industrialists Thomas Taylor and Frank Taylor donated the Taylor Memorial Bridge to the town, connecting the public Wood Park and Apsley Park across the Assabet River.

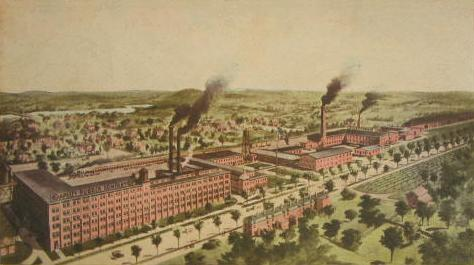
Apsley Rubber Company in 1911

Today, the majority of Hudson residents are of Irish or Portuguese descent, with lesser populations of Brazilian, Italian, French, French Canadian, English, Scotch-Irish, Greek, and Polish descent. About one-third of Hudson residents are of Portuguese descent or birth. Most people of Portuguese descent in Hudson are from the Azorean island of Santa Maria, with a smaller amount from the island of São Miguel, the Madeira islands, or from the Trás-os-Montes region of mainland Portugal. The Portuguese community in Hudson maintains the Hudson Portuguese Club, which was established in 1919. It has outlived Hudson's other ethnic clubs, including the Buonovia Club (Italian American), the Lithuanian Citizens' Club, a Polish American club, and other Portuguese American clubs. In 2003 the Hudson Portuguese Club replaced its original Port Street clubhouse with a function hall and restaurant built on the same site.

The Portuguese American community in Hudson traces its history to at least 1886, when a certain José Maria Tavares arrived in town. José's brothers João "John" and Manuel joined him the following year. In 1888 three more Portuguese immigrants reached Hudson: eighteen-year-old José "Joseph" Braga, and António Chaves and his sister Maria. In 1889 the six-person Garcia family arrived. The 1890s saw the addition of the Bairos, Camara, Correia, and Luz families. In 1900 Mr. and Mrs. José "Joseph" Almada and Mrs. Almada's brother Manuel Silva settled in Hudson. By 1910 eleven more Portuguese families resided in Hudson: the Coito, Costa, Furtado, Grillo, Mello, Pereira, Pimentel, Rainha, Resendes, Ribeiro, and Sousa families. This initial group of Portuguese immigrants all hailed from the Azorean islands of Santa Maria or São Miguel.

By 1916 immigrants from mainland Portugal reached Hudson, including a certain João "John" Rio and family. As early as the 1920s, Hudson's Portuguese population exceeded 1000 individuals—more than 10% of Hudson's total population at the time. Some were employed as factory workers, though many also owned small businesses.

Hudson also welcomed a small but well-documented Lithuanian American community. This community originated in 1897, when Anthony Markunas arrived in Hudson. Another early Lithuanian immigrant was Michael Rimkus, who owned and operated a grocery store on the corner of Loring and Broad streets from 1908 to 1950. It appears Lithuanians came to Hudson from larger communities located in Nashua, Worcester, and Boston. Apparently Hudson's Lithuanians were known for their herb gardens—where they grew rue, chamomile, and mint—and beekeeping. For many years Mr. Karol Baranowski maintained on apiary on Lois Street (now Mason Street). His next-door neighbor Dominic Janciauskas, a fellow Lithuanian American, operated a silver fox farm. The community was large and active enough to support the social and recreational Lithuanian Citizens' Club, located on School Street from 1926 to 1960.

Hudson's population hovered around 8,000 from the 1920s to the 1950s, when developers purchased some farms surrounding the town center. The new houses built on this land helped double Hudson's population to 16,000 by 1970.

From the 1970s through the 1990s high-technology companies built plants in Hudson, most notably the Hudson Fab semiconductor factory built by Digital Equipment Corporation in 1979. Just before Digital folded in 1998, Intel bought this facility. Under Intel's ownership, the plant continued producing silicon chips and wafers.

=== 21st century ===
At the height of the Great Recession in the late 2000s, Hudson lost many local businesses. Particularly affected were the downtown commercial district and industrial establishments. Further bad news came in 2013 when Intel, Hudson's largest employer and charitable donor, announced it would close its Hudson semiconductor factory and layoff 700 employees by 2014. Initially Intel tried to find a buyer for the facility, but when none came forward by 2015, Intel announced it would demolish the plant. However, Intel's campus in Hudson includes an 850-person microprocessor research and development facility that did not close, and remains operational as of 2026.

Since the mid-2010s Hudson's commercial downtown has witnessed an economic revitalization, with previously empty storefronts finding tenants. This is partly thanks to the town's increasing role as a regional culinary destination, including for craft beer. Hudson's craft beer scene arguably began in 1980 when the Horseshoe Pub & Restaurant opened. In 2012, the Hudson Rotary Club, Horseshoe Pub, and other local businesses organized the first Spirit of Hudson Food and Brewfest to showcase local restaurants and breweries. Since then, the event has evolved into a large food and beer fest featuring dozens of restaurants and breweries, from tiny local producers to internationally known craft beer stalwarts such as Harpoon and Stone Brewing. The first microbrewery in Hudson, Medusa Brewing Company, opened downtown in 2015. A second—Ground Effect Brewing Company—followed in 2018. In 2022 Ground Effect changed hands with the opening of Clover Road Brewing Company, in the same location with the same head brewer, but new ownership.

Although Hudson's population is now about 20,000, the town maintains the traditional town meeting form of government. Some light manufacturing and agricultural uses remain in the eastern end of town, a vestige of Hudson's dual agrarian and industrial history. However, today Hudson is a mostly suburban bedroom community with many residents commuting to Boston or Worcester.

=== Former names ===
Before becoming a separate incorporated town in 1866, Hudson was a neighborhood and unincorporated village within the town—now city—of Marlborough, and had various names during that time.

From 1656 until 1700, present-day Hudson and the surrounding area was known as the Indian Plantation or the Cow Commons. From 1700 to 1800, the settlement was known as Howe's Mills, Barnard's Mills, or The Mills, evidencing its early industrial history. From 1800 to 1828, the settlement was called New City, for reasons not entirely clear but perhaps related to increased population and industrialization. From 1828 until incorporation in 1866, the village was called Feltonville. The name Feltonville derives from that of Silas Felton, who operated a dry goods store in the hamlet from 1799 onward and served many years as a Marlborough selectman, town clerk, town assessor, and postmaster. Today, Felton remains immortalized in the Silas Felton Hudson Historic District and two Hudson street names: Felton Street and Feltonville Road.

== Geography ==
According to the United States Census Bureau, the town has a total area of 11.8 square miles (30.7 km^{2}), of which 11.5 square miles (29.8 km^{2}) is land and 0.3 square miles (0.9 km^{2}) (2.87%) is water.

The Assabet River runs prominently through most of Hudson. The river arises from wetlands in Westborough and flows northeast 34 miles (55 km), starting at an elevation of 320 feet (98 m). It descends through the towns of Northborough, Marlborough, Berlin, Hudson, Stow, Maynard, Acton, and finally Concord, where it merges with the Sudbury River to form the Concord River, at an elevation of 100 feet (30 m). The dam in central Hudson is one of nine historic mill or flood control dams on the Assabet River. A portion of the Assabet River National Wildlife Refuge is located in Hudson.

There are various public access points to the Assabet River in Hudson. The back of the Hudson Public Library parking lot provides access to launch canoes and kayaks. Downstream is the dam, but upstream provides miles of flat water—depending on the season, as far southeast as the dam at Millham Reservoir in Marlborough. Another canoe and kayak launch exists farther upstream behind Hudson High School, accessible via an unpaved parking lot on Chapin Street. There is also boat access downstream of the dam at Main Street Landing, accessible from the paved Assabet River Rail Trail parking lot on Main Street, and providing a few miles of paddling northeast until the mill dam in the Stow section of Gleasondale.

On the border with Stow are Lake Boon, a popular vacation spot prior to the widespread adoption of the automobile but now a primarily residential neighborhood, and White Pond, which historically provided drinking water to Maynard and is still owned by that town.

On the border with Marlborough is Fort Meadow Reservoir, which once provided drinking water to Hudson and Marlborough. The Town of Hudson owns and maintains Centennial Beach on the shores of Fort Meadow Reservoir. It is open to residents and non-residents for the cost of a daily or season pass, typically from June to August.

Hudson features two partially completed rail trails, the Mass Central Rail Trail, extending across Massachusetts between Northampton and Boston, and the Assabet River Rail Trail, between Marlborough and Acton.

=== Adjacent municipalities ===
Hudson is bordered by four towns and one city: Bolton and Stow on the north, the city of Marlborough on the south, Sudbury on the east, and Berlin on the west.

=== Villages ===
The neighborhood and unincorporated village of Gleasondale straddles Hudson and Stow.

== Demographics ==
Historical population
Year	Pop.	±%
1870	3,389	—
1880	3,739	+10.3%
1890	4,670	+24.9%
1900	5,454	+16.8%
1910	6,743	+23.6%
1920	7,607	+12.8%
1930	8,460	+11.2%
1940	8,042	−4.9%
1950	8,211	+2.1%
1960	9,666	+17.7%
1970	16,084	+66.4%
1980	16,408	+2.0%
1990	17,233	+5.0%
2000	18,113	+5.1%
2010	19,063	+5.2%
2020	20,092	+5.4%
2024*	20,364	+1.4%
* = population estimate. Source: United States Census records and Population Estimates Program data.

As of the 2000 census, there were 18,113 people, 6,990 households, and 4,844 families residing in the town. The population density was 1,574.4 inhabitants per square mile (607.9/km^{2}). There were 7,168 housing units at an average density of 623.0 per square mile (240.5/km^{2}). The racial makeup of the town was 94.12% White, 0.91% Black or African American, 0.13% Native American, 1.40% Asian, 0.06% Pacific Islander, 1.40% from other races, and 1.98% from two or more races. Hispanic or Latino of any race were 3.06% of the population.

There were 6,990 households, out of which 32.0% had children under the age of 18 living with them, 56.7% were married couples living together, 9.2% had a female householder with no husband present, and 30.7% were non-families. Of all households, 25.2% were made up of individuals, and 9.5% had someone living alone who was 65 years of age or older. The average household size was 2.57 and the average family size was 3.11.

In the town, the population was spread out, with 24.0% under the age of 18, 6.7% from 18 to 24, 33.5% from 25 to 44, 23.6% from 45 to 64, and 12.2% who were 65 years of age or older. The median age was 37 years. For every 100 females, there were 97.8 males. For every 100 females age 18 and over, there were 94.6 males.

The median income for a household in the town was $58,549, and the median income for a family was $70,145. Males had a median income of $45,504 versus $35,207 for females. The per capita income for the town was $26,679. About 2.7% of families and 4.5% of the population were below the poverty line, including 3.8% of those under age 18 and 8.7% of those age 65 or over.

As of 2017 Census Bureau estimates, Hudson's population increased to 19,994. The town's racial makeup was 92.6% white, 1.3% Black or African American, 0.1% Native American, 2.7% Asian, and 2.5% from two or more races, with Hispanic or Latino people of any race making up 6.7% of the population.

=== Education ===
According to 2017 Census Bureau estimates, 90.3% of Hudson residents graduated high school or higher, while 39.8% have a bachelor's degree or higher. The Census Bureau estimated that in the five-year period between 2013 and 2017, 86.3% of Hudson households had a broadband internet subscription.

== Government ==
County government: Middlesex County
Clerk of Courts:	Michael A. Sullivan
District Attorney:	Marian T. Ryan
Register of Deeds:	Maria C. Curtatone (South Middlesex Registry)
Register of Probate and Family Court:	Tara E. DeCristofaro
County Sheriff:	Peter Koutoujian
State government
State Representative:	Rep. Kate Hogan (D)
State Senator:	Sen. Jamie Eldridge (D)
Governor's Councilor:	Marilyn M. Petitto-Devaney (Third District)
Federal government
U.S. Representative:	Lori Trahan (D-3rd District)
U.S. Senators:	Elizabeth Warren (D), Ed Markey (D)

=== Local government ===
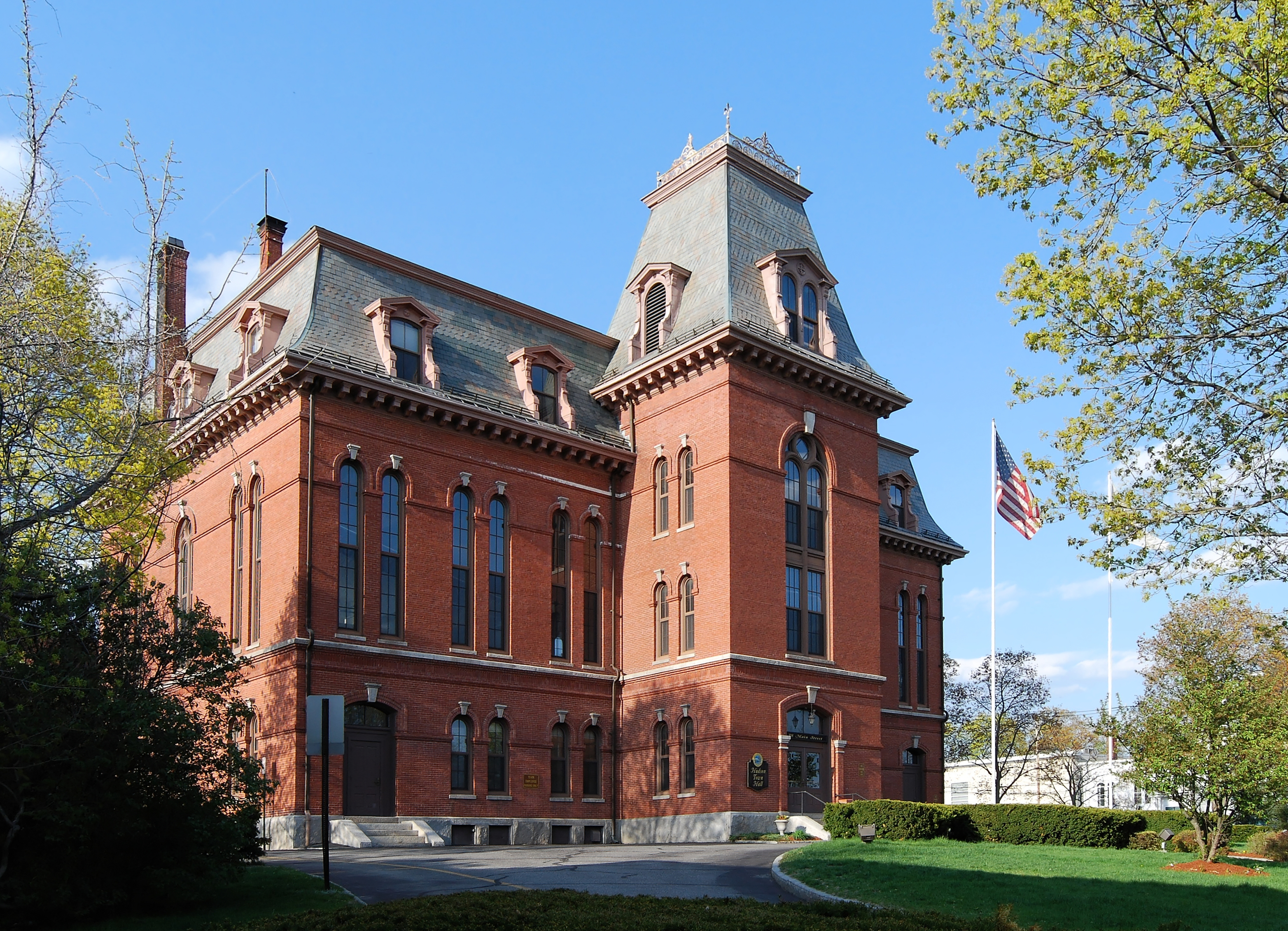
Hudson Town Hall, built in 1872

The Town of Hudson has an open town meeting form of government, like most New England towns. The Town Manager (formerly titled Executive Assistant) is an official appointed by the Select Board who is responsible for the day-to-day administrative affairs of the town. They function with authority delegated to the office by the town charter and bylaws. The current Town Manager is Thomas Gregory. The Select Board is a group of publicly elected officials who are the executive authority of the town. The Select Board was formerly known as the Board of Selectmen. The title was officially changed by an affirmative vote of Article 26 of the Hudson Town Meeting on May 1, 2021. There are five positions on the Hudson Select Board, currently filled by Scott R. Duplisea, Judy Congdon, Diane G. Bemis, James D. Quinn, and Steven C. Sharek. The Select Board elect from among their membership the positions of chairman, vice-chairman, and clerk.

The Massachusetts legislature abolished the Middlesex County government in 1997. Former county agencies and institutions reverted to the control of the state government of the Commonwealth of Massachusetts. Certain county government positions, such as District Attorney and Sheriff, still function under the state government instead of a county government.

== Education ==
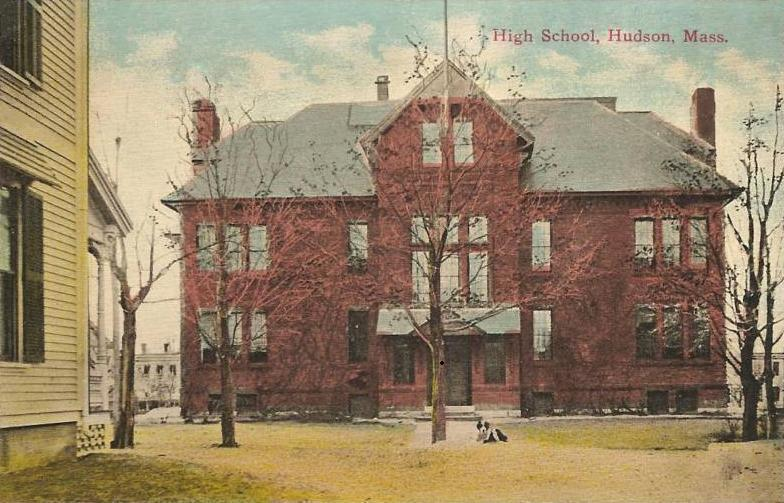
Felton Street School in 1912, now converted into condominiums

Hudson's local public school district is Hudson Public Schools, a district open to Hudson residents and through school choice to any area students. The superintendent of Hudson Public Schools is Dr. Brian Reagan. Prior to starting ninth grade Hudson students may choose to attend either Hudson High School or Assabet Valley Regional Technical High School. Assabet Valley Regional Technical High School is open to students from Berlin, Hudson, Maynard, Northborough, Southborough, Westborough, and Marlborough.

=== Schools ===
- Camela A. Farley Elementary School
- Forest Avenue Elementary School
- Joseph L. Mulready Elementary School
- David J. Quinn Middle School
- Hudson High School

=== Private schools ===
- Saint Michael's School was a private Catholic primary school that served grades 1 through 8 as well as kindergarten. The original building was built in 1918, when the school was founded, and the school was administered by Saint Michael's Catholic Parish. When Hudson Catholic High School closed in 2009, Saint Michael's School moved to the former HCHS building. In May 2011 the parish announced the school would close at the end of the school year. The original St. Michael's School building stood empty for a few years before the parish demolished it to expand its existing parking lot.
- Hudson Catholic High School (HCHS) was a private Catholic high school that served grades 9 through 12. It was completed in 1959 and was administered by Saint Michael's Catholic Parish. The principal was Caroline Flynn and the assistant principal was Mark Wentworth at the school's closure. The parish announced only about a month before the end of the 2008–2009 school year that the school would be closed by the Boston Archdiocese due to lack of enrollment—and, as a consequence, funds—for the 2009–2010 school year. The HCHS building was then used as the Saint Michael's School building, which itself closed in May 2011, and has since been demolished. The parish sold the former HCHS lot, on which now stands a Walgreens pharmacy.
- A former private Catholic school district known as Saint Michael's Schools and administered by Saint Michael's Catholic Parish closed in 2011.

== Library ==
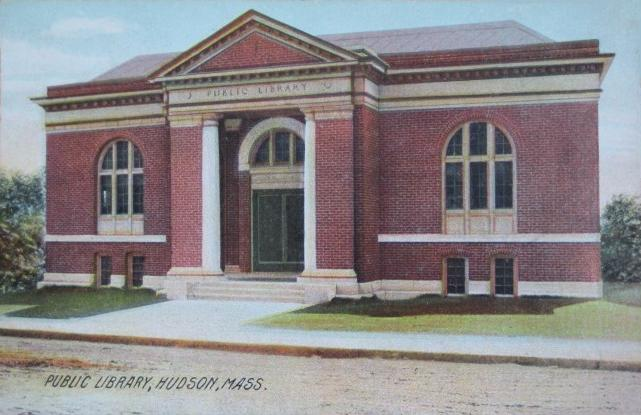
Hudson Public Library in 1907, a Carnegie library opened in 1905

The first public library in Hudson opened in 1867 thanks to $500 (~$11,518 in 2025) in financial assistance from Charles Hudson and matching funds provided by the nascent town. This first library was a modest reading room in the Brigham Block building and contained 721 books. In 1873 the library moved to a room in the newly completed Hudson Town Hall. The current Hudson Public Library (HPL) building is a Carnegie library first built in 1905 using a $12,500 donation from Andrew Carnegie. It opened to the public on November 16, 1905.

The original structure was a two-story Beaux-Arts design typical of Carnegie libraries and other American public buildings of the early twentieth century. Despite numerous additions over time the Carnegie building is mostly intact, including its original front entrance and handsome main stair. The town added a third story to the building in 1932 for a total cost of $15,000 (~$287,902 in 2025). Today the third floor serves as a quiet reading room, and also houses the periodicals collection, a community meeting room, and staff offices. In 1966 a two-story Modernist addition was added at the rear of the original building, more than doubling the library's size. The children's department, housed on the library's first floor, was expanded and renovated in 2002. The second floor serves as the adults' and teens' department.

The Hudson Public Library's collection has grown to approximately 65,000 books, periodicals, audio recordings, video recordings, historical records, and other items as of 2020. As part of its collection HPL owns three oil paintings, each a portrait portraying one of the library's major benefactors: Charles Hudson, Lewis Dewart Apsley, and Andrew Carnegie. Apsley funded his own portrait as well as that of Charles Hudson, while the portrait of Carnegie was a 1935 gift from the Carnegie Corporation. These portraits are displayed on the landing of the stair going up to the third floor reading room.

Hudson Public Library is a member of the CW MARS regional library consortium and catalog. This allows Hudson cardholders to borrow items from other central and western Massachusetts public libraries and gives cardholders from those libraries access to Hudson's collection. In fiscal year 2008, the Town of Hudson spent 1.19% ($614,743) of its budget on its public library—approximately $31 per person, per year.

== Religion ==
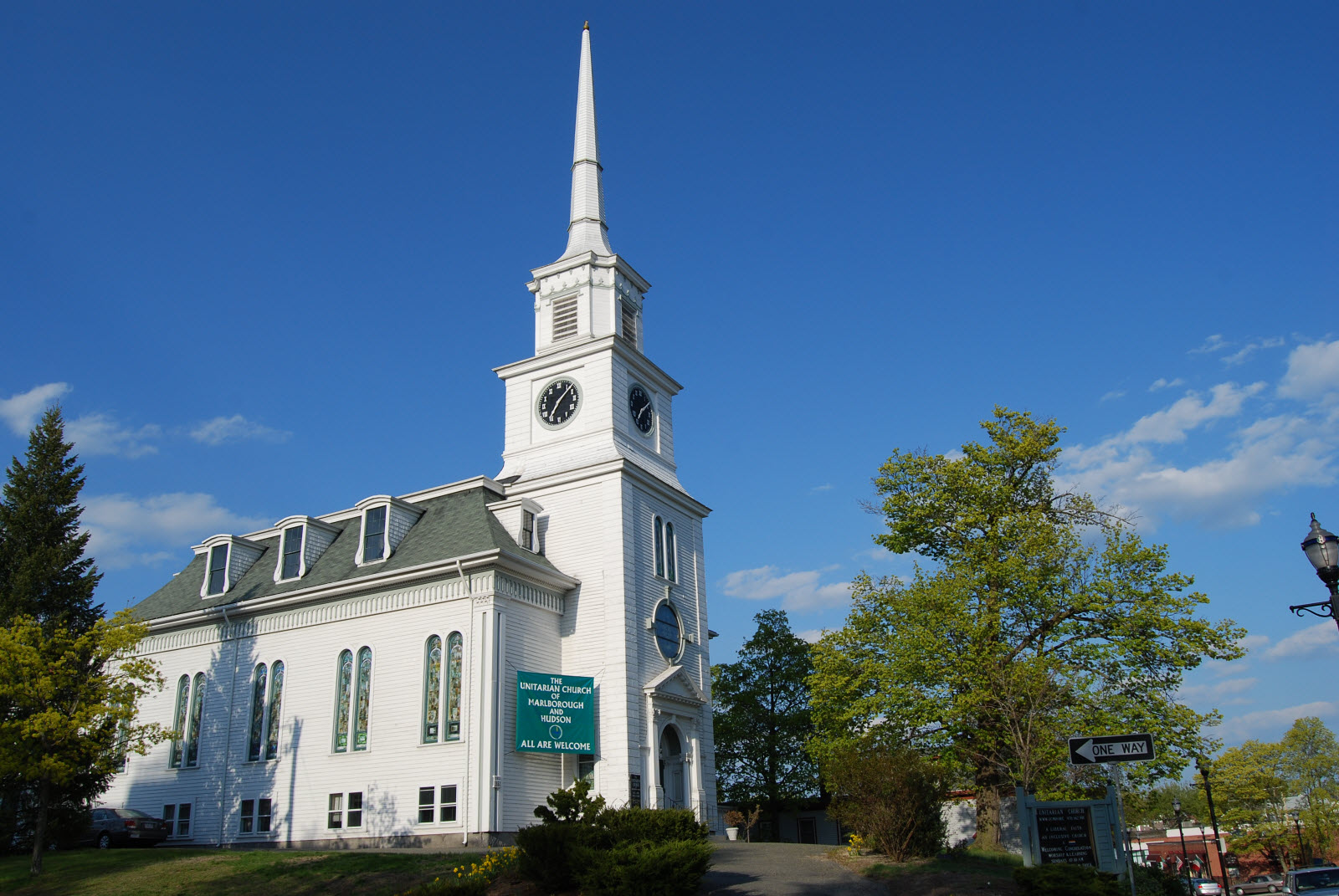
Unitarian Church, built in 1861

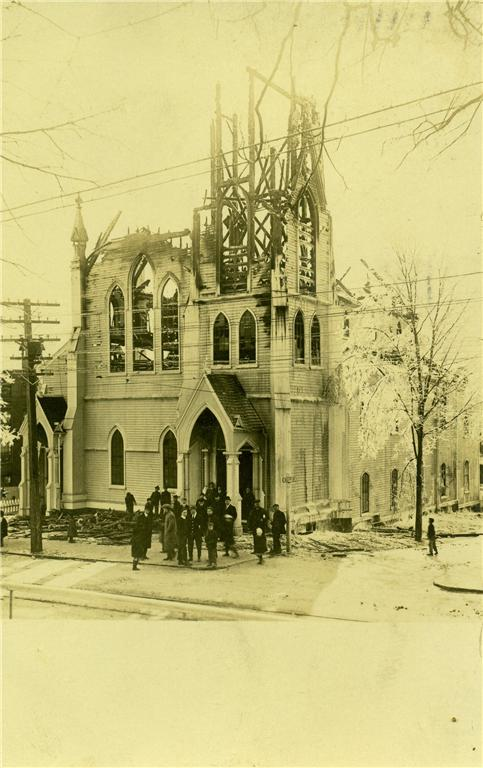
Methodist-Episcopal Church after 1911 fire; it was replaced in 1913

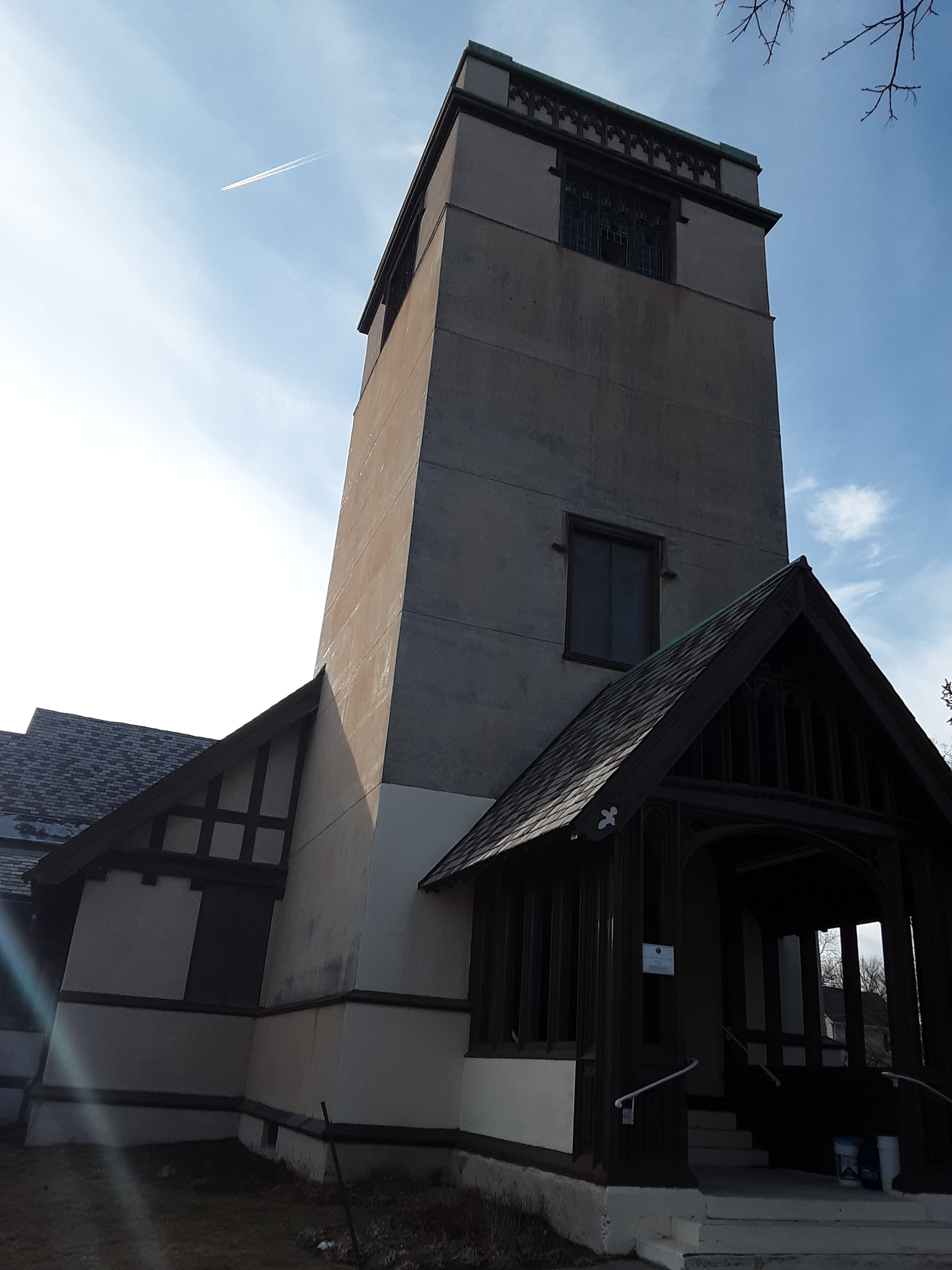
The First United Methodist Church on Felton Street, built in 1912-1913

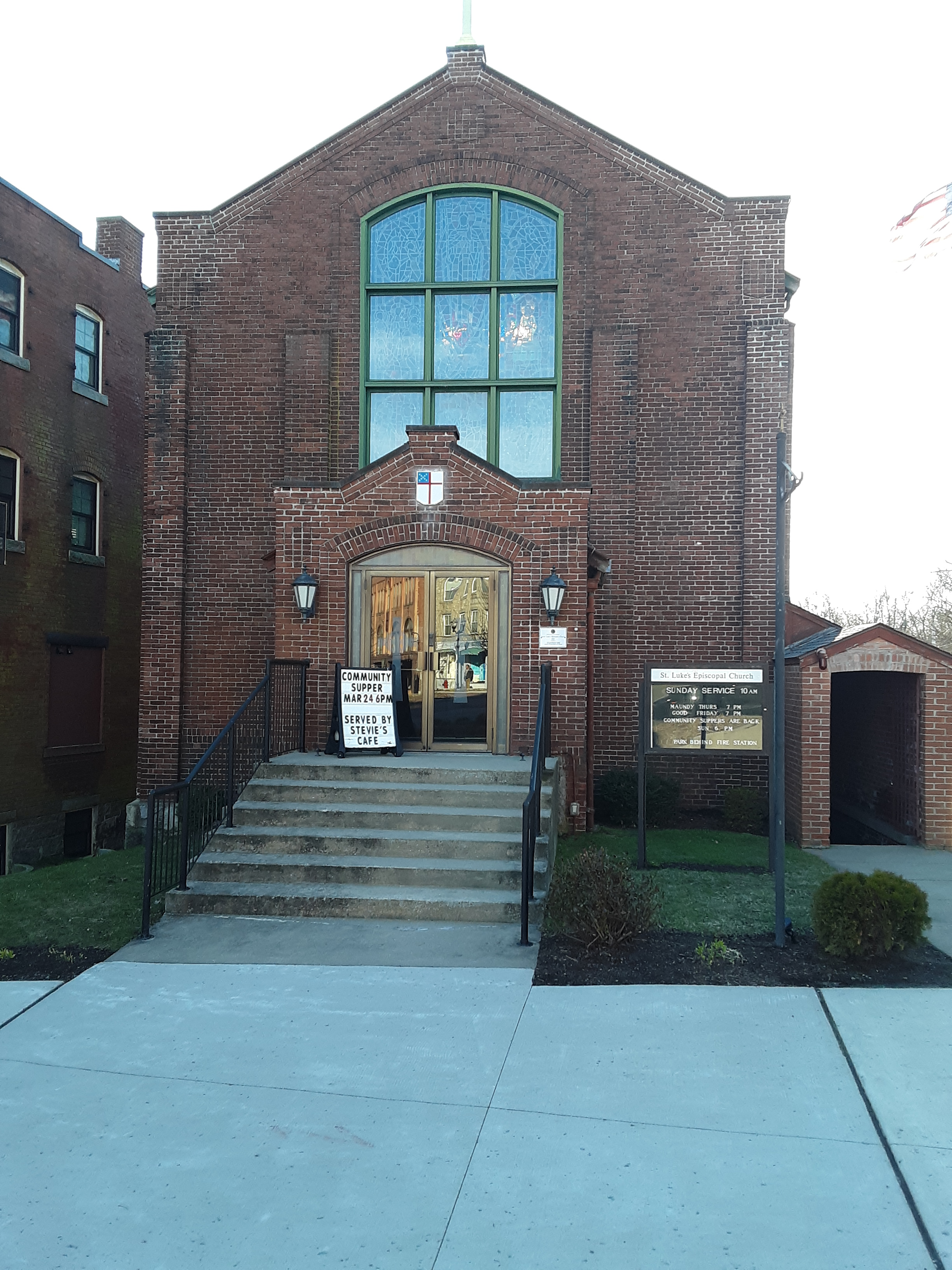
St. Luke's Episcopal Church on Washington Street, built in 1913

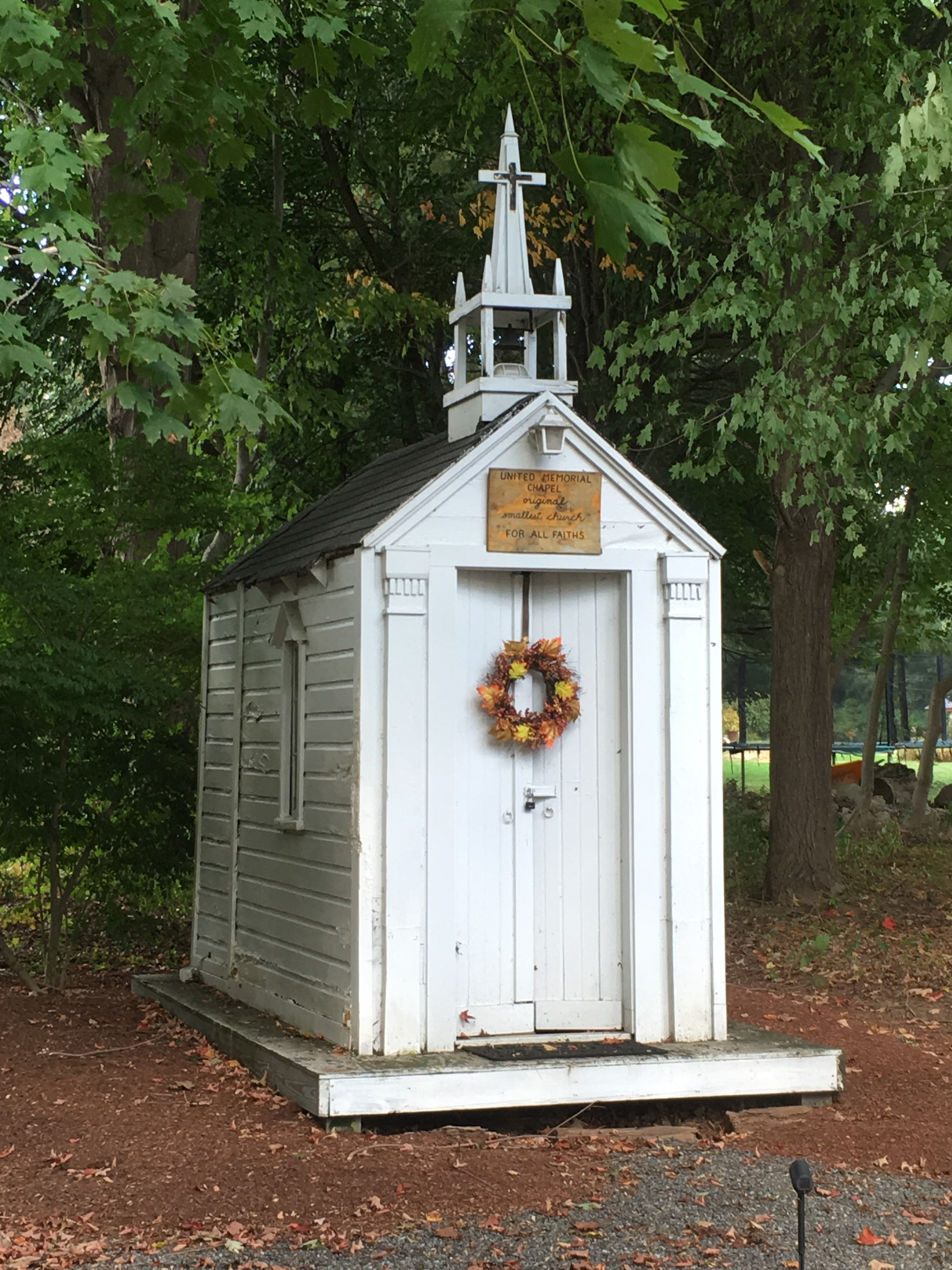
Union Church of All Faiths

The majority of Hudson residents who practice a religion are likely Catholics or Protestants, based on the churches existing in town.

A small portion of town residents are Jewish, Muslim, Buddhist, or Eastern Orthodox, but there are not currently synagogues, mosques, temples, or Orthodox churches in Hudson. Nevertheless, the town lends its name to the 1907 Hudson Incident—a key event in the Albanian Orthodox Church's formation—in which an Albanian nationalist died in Hudson and was refused burial rites by area Greek Orthodox priests.

The Portuguese Catholics in Hudson hold annual feasts or festivals honoring and celebrating the Holy Ghost and Our Lady of Fátima, known in Portuguese as Festas do Espírito Santo and Festa da Nossa Senhora de Fátima, respectively. There are three related but distinct festas in Hudson: the Império Mariense, the lmpério Micaelense, and the Lady of Fátima Feast / Festa da Nossa Senhora de Fátima. The oldest of these is the Império Micaelense festival, which traces its origins to 1914. Such festivals are a common religious and sociocultural event in the Azores and in Portuguese communities of Azorean descent throughout the United States, Canada, and Brazil.

=== Houses of worship ===
Carmel Marthoma Church on River Road is the newest church building in Hudson, constructed in 2001. The congregation traces its beginnings to the early 1970s as a prayer fellowship that met in the greater Boston area. In 1981 the parent Mar Thoma Syrian Church officially recognized this gathering as a congregation and part of its Diocese of North America and Europe. In 1984 the congregation registered as a legal entity in Massachusetts, with nine families becoming members. As of 2018 the congregation numbered 120 families residing throughout Massachusetts, Connecticut, New Hampshire, and Rhode Island. The current vicar is Rev. Thomas John.

The First Federated Church on Central Street was built between 1967 and 1968. It is a Baptist–Congregational church associated with American Baptist Churches USA and the United Church of Christ. The Baptist portion of the federated congregation traces its origins to 1844, when Feltonville residents invited a revivalist preacher to hold services for them. This Baptist community grew large enough to build and open their own Feltonville Baptist Church building in 1851; it was located on Church Street behind the Unitarian Church, where the Hudson Boys and Girls Club stands today. A rapidly growing congregation necessitated a larger church built on the same site in 1877. The Congregational side of the church traces its origins to at least 1889, when Congregationalists from Hudson held meetings in downtown's Chase Block building. In 1902 they built their own church at the corner of Green and Central streets. In 1918, after some time of combined worship, the Congregational and Baptist churches decided to merge into one congregation—the First Federated Church—and worship at the Baptists' Church Street building. The Congregational church building became a community hall with bowling alleys until it was sold to a French Catholic congregation in 1927: this church would become Christ the King Catholic Church (see below). On the morning of September 23, 1965, a fire severely damaged the 1877 Baptist church, which had to be demolished. After fundraising for a new structure, the First Federated Church broke ground at Central Street on Palm Sunday, March 19, 1967, and opened the new church on Palm Sunday one year later, April 7, 1968.

The First United Methodist Church of Hudson on Felton Street was completed in 1912 or 1913 after the previous one, which was located across the street from the Unitarian Church in central Hudson, burned in a 1911 fire. The congregation traces its origins back to early settler Phineas Sawyer, who converted to Methodism in 1789 and opened his home to Methodist meetings in 1800. In 1828 Feltonville's Methodists built a brick meetinghouse on Gospel Hill in what would become eastern Hudson. This structure burned on December 28, 1852, after which the congregation worshiped at the Methodist church in Gleasondale (then known as Rock Bottom), until 1863. Sometime in the succeeding decades the congregation built an ornate wood-framed church on Main Street, which they lost in the 1911 fire.

Grace Church (formerly called Grace Baptist Church) on River Road is a Southern Baptist congregation founded in 1986 and moved to its current location in 1996. The congregation has grown from an original 25 to a current 1,200 members. The current lead pastor is Marc Peña.

The Hudson Seventh-day Adventist Church on Marlboro Street was built in the 1960s.

Saint Luke's Episcopal Church on Washington Street was built in 1913. The brick church building boasts a 1930 Møller pipe organ. The current rector is Rev. James T. Kodera.

Saint Michael's Catholic Church—also known as St. Mike's—is a Catholic congregation and parish located on Manning Street. It has existed as a congregation since 1869, though the first recorded Catholic resident of Feltonville was a certain James Wilson, who arrived in 1834. The present Gothic Revival church was designed by architect P. C. Kelly of New York City and built in 1889. In 1996 the building underwent a major renovation funded by parishioners. In 2000 neighboring Catholic parish Christ the King Parish was suppressed and merged with Saint Michael Parish.

The Unitarian Church of Marlborough and Hudson is a Unitarian Universalist congregation associated with the Unitarian Universalist Association. Anti-slavery abolitionists founded the congregation. The Unitarian Church building located on the corner of Main and Church streets in downtown Hudson is older than the town itself, as it was built in 1861. The church hosts a Buddhist meeting group. The current minister is Rev. Alice Anacheka-Nasemann.

=== Churches no longer in use ===
Christ the King Catholic Church and Parish was located on the corner of Central and Green streets. It was built in 1902 as a Congregational church, became a community hall in 1918, and was purchased by a French Catholic congregation in 1927. In 2000 Christ the King Parish was suppressed and merged with neighboring Saint Michael Parish. In 2004 then pastor Fr. Walter A. Carreiro and the Parish Pastoral Council decided to suspend the church building's use for worship. At the same time the St. Michael Early Childhood Center, located in a building on the same property, was relocated to Saint Michael School. The church was closed at the same time as other churches in the Boston Archdiocese were being closed to respond to the shortage of vocations and not to help pay sex abuse lawsuits, as is sometimes misreported. Christ the King was not closed by the Archdiocese and proceeds of its subsequent sale to the Tighe-Hamilton Funeral Home reverted directly to Saint Michael Parish. The building still exists as a memorial service chapel for Tighe Hamilton Funeral Home.

The Union Church of All Faiths, also known as the United Memorial Chapel for All Faiths, is a 5-foot (1.5 m) by 11-foot (3.4 m) wood-frame building located in Hudson. It is occasionally cited as the smallest church in the United States. However, smaller and older "tiny churches" exist in the United States. Retired clergyman Rev. Louis Winthrop West built the chapel in 1953 on the grounds of the First Federated Church of Hudson, where it was located for many years. The building's interior fits four people, although 100 people sometimes gathered outside for religious services, including weddings. In 2003 former Hudson resident Vic Petkauskos bought the chapel, relocated it to Hyannis, and renovated it. He planned to place it on a barge and hold wedding ceremonies off the coast of Cape Cod, although whether he ever did so is unclear. The church still exists: at some point it made its way back to Hudson from Hyannis. It is currently located on private property on Causeway Street in Hudson, where it is visible from the road.

== Media ==
=== Newspapers ===
- The Community Advocate

== Notable people ==
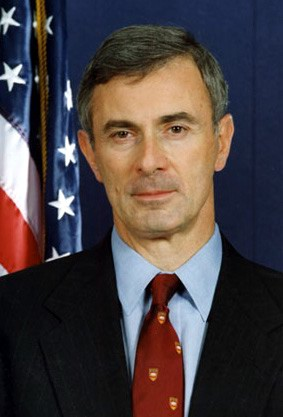
Former Governor Paul Cellucci

- Lewis Dewart Apsley, founder of Apsley Rubber Company; U.S. Congressman from Massachusetts from 1893 to 1897
- Luís Gil Bettencourt, traditional and rock guitarist; older brother of Nuno Bettencourt
- Nuno Bettencourt, rock musician; lead guitarist for the band Extreme
- Matt Burke, defensive coordinator for the Houston Texans, raised in Hudson and graduated from Hudson High School
- Tina Cardinale-Beauchemin, captain of the first United States women's national ice hockey team
- Paul Cellucci, Governor of Massachusetts from 1997 to 2001 and United States Ambassador to Canada from 2001 to 2005
- Shaye Cogan, singer, vaudevillian, and film actor popular in the 1950s
- William D. Coolidge, physicist who invented an improved X-ray tube, developed the tungsten filament for the incandescent light bulb, was vice-president of General Electric, and was elected to the National Inventors Hall of Fame in 1975
- Hugo Ferreira, rock musician; singer-songwriter for the band Tantric
- Kevin Figueiredo, rock drummer; drummer for the band Extreme
- Johnny Gilroy, All-American football halfback at Georgetown University and professional player during the 1920s for the Canton Bulldogs, Cleveland Tigers, Washington Senators, and Boston Bulldogs
- Pete Manning, professional American and Canadian football player during the 1960s for the Chicago Bears, Calgary Stampeders, and Toronto Argonauts
- Evan Markopoulos, professional wrestler of TNA Gut Check fame
- Marykate O'Neil, indie-pop singer-songwriter and guitarist
- Brigette Peterson, mayor of Gilbert, Arizona
- Charles Precourt, retired U.S. astronaut
- William B. Rice, industrialist and businessman who co-founded Rice & Hutchins, a shoe manufacturing company
- Wilbert Robinson, catcher for various Major League Baseball teams; best known for being manager of the Brooklyn Dodgers from 1914 to 1931; inducted into the Baseball Hall of Fame in 1945; born in Bolton but raised in Hudson
- Paul Ryan, comic artist on Fantastic Four and The Phantom; born in Somerville but a long-time Hudson resident until his death in 2016
- Thomas P. Salmon, Governor of Vermont from 1973 to 1977; born in Cleveland, Ohio, raised in Stow, and attended Hudson High School
- William C. Sullivan, former head of FBI intelligence operations
- Lucy Goodale Thurston, one of the first American Protestant missionaries in Hawaii
- Burton Kendall Wheeler, U.S. Senator from Montana from 1923 to 1947

== Popular culture ==
Portions of the 2018 comedy film Father of the Year were shot in Hudson in 2017. Filming for the television programs Castle Rock and Defending Jacob took in place in Hudson in 2019.

== See also ==
- Assabet River Rail Trail
- Mass Central Rail Trail—Wayside
- Firestone-Apsley Rubber Company
- Gleasondale, Massachusetts
- Hudson Public Schools
- List of mill towns in Massachusetts

== General and cited references ==
- Halprin, Lewis; The Hudson Historical Society (2001) [First published 1999]. Images of America: Hudson. Charleston, SC: Arcadia Publishing. ISBN 0-7385-0073-9.
- Halprin, Lewis; The Hudson Historical Society (2008). Postcard History Series: Hudson. Charleston, SC: Arcadia Publishing. ISBN 978-0-7385-6284-1.
- The Hudson Historical Society (1976). Hudson Bicentennial Scrapbook. Private publication.
- Mayo, Dorothy Ordway; The Hudson Historical Society (1966). Hudson. Bolton, MA: Bolton Printing Co.
- McAdow, Ron (1990). The Concord, Sudbury and Assabet Rivers: A Guide to Canoeing, Wildlife and History (First ed.). Marlborough, MA: Bliss Publishing Company, Inc. ISBN 0-9625144-0-3.
- Worcester, E. F. (Edward F.) (1914) [Revised edition of Hudson, Past and Present (1899)]. Hudson Yesterday and Today. Hudson, MA: Hudson Publishing Co. hdl:2027/bc.ark:/13960/t5gb81266.
- Verdone, William L.; Halprin, Lewis (2005). Images of America: Hudson's National Guard Militia. Charleston, SC: Arcadia Publishing. ISBN 0-7385-4456-6.
