= Colonel Adelbert Mossman House =

Historic house in Massachusetts, United States

- U.S. National Register of Historic Places
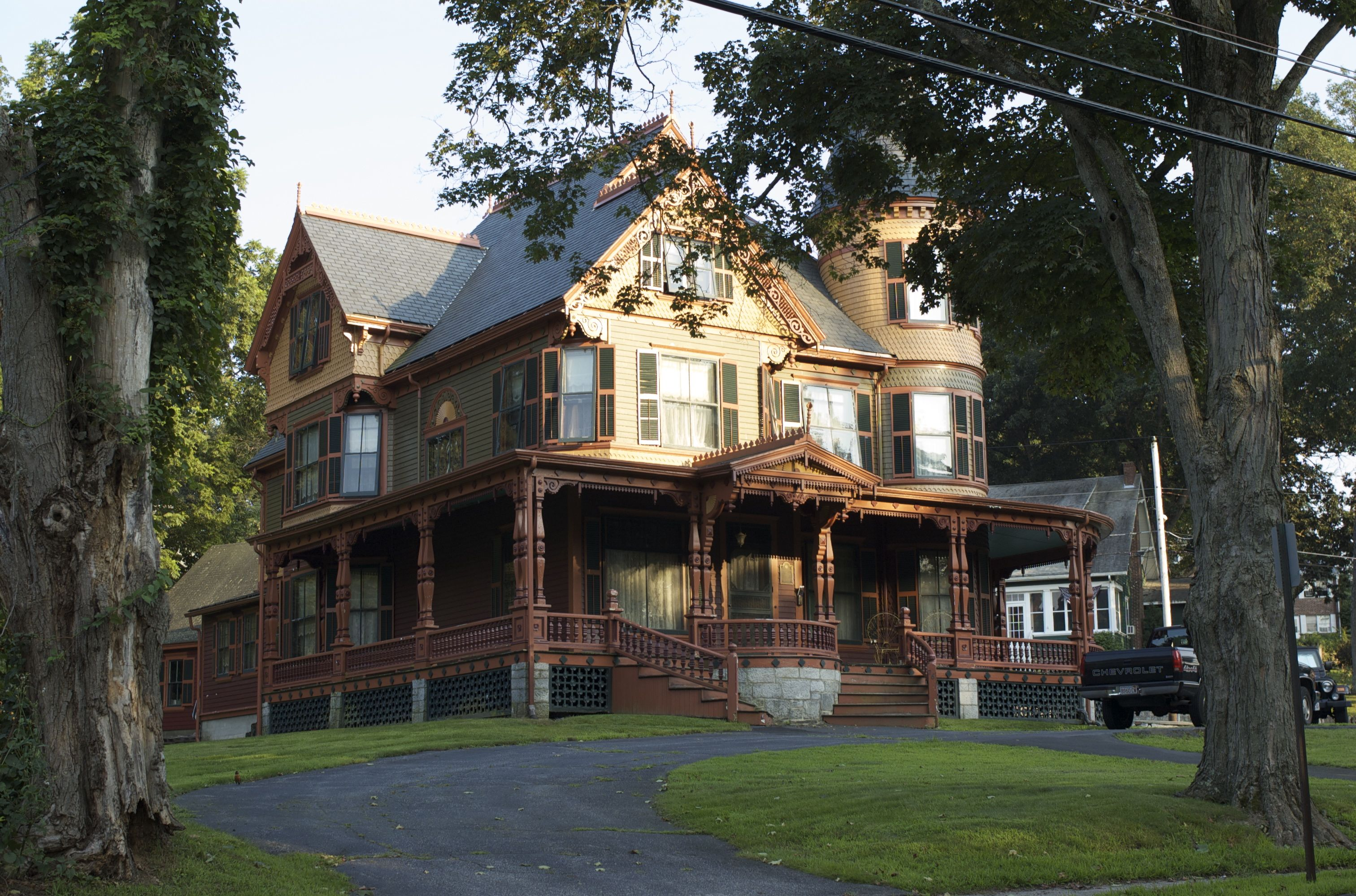

- Location within Massachusetts Location within the United States
- Location: 76 Park Street, Hudson, Massachusetts
- Coordinates: 42°23′8″N 71°34′30″W
- Built: 1895–1903
- Architect: Colonel Adelbert Mossman
- Architectural style: Queen Anne
- NRHP reference No.: 82001904
- Added to NRHP: September 30, 1982

The Colonel Adelbert Mossman House is a historic house built between 1895 and 1903 located at 76 Park Street in Hudson, Massachusetts, United States. It is a 2 1/2-story wood-frame structure with asymmetrical massing typical of Queen Anne Victorian architecture. It has elaborate exterior and interior detailing. The house is listed on the National Register of Historic Places.

== History ==
Construction of the house began sometime between 1895 and 1898, and was completed by 1903. Colonel Adelbert Mossman (1848–1945), an American Civil War veteran of the 35th New Jersey Infantry Regiment, designed the house for himself. Mossman returned to Massachusetts after the war and in 1887 organized and led Hudson's first militia, the 5th Massachusetts Volunteers. Mossman was promoted to colonel while serving in this militia. In 1901 he was appointed sergeant-at-arms of the Massachusetts State House. While his house was being built Mossman also worked as a buyer for the Massachusetts Office of the Superintendent of Buildings, which likely facilitated his home's construction.

Mossman died in 1945. Cecil W. Veinotte, a carpenter, and his wife Virginia M. Veinotte bought the house in 1946 and owned it until 1981. Dr. Bernard M. Flavhan, dentist, and wife Carol S. Flavhan purchased the home in 1981. Carol Flavhan became sole owner in 1984. She sold the house to the current owners in 1994.

The house was added to National Register of Historic Places on September 30, 1982.

== Architecture ==
The Colonel Adelbert Mossman house is a well-preserved exemplar of Queen Anne style architecture and craft. It is located at 76 Park Street in Hudson across the street from Wood Park and the Taylor Memorial Bridge. The park and the Assabet River are visible from the house.

The house's exterior is complex; typical for Queen Anne houses. Key exterior features include a tower capped by a conical roof, bay windows, high gables with decorative woodwork, carved brackets and moulding, and a wraparound porch with grouped turned columns and spindlework valances.

The home contains 20 intricately detailed rooms. Interior architectural elements include pocket doors, non-rectilinear walls and ceilings, detailed mantels, an intricate main stair with gas lamps placed on top of carved newels, and Victorian woodwork detailing throughout.

An original carriage house was replaced in 1952.

== See also ==
- National Register of Historic Places listings in Middlesex County, Massachusetts
