= George W. Weymouth =

American politician (1850–1910)

George Warren Weymouth
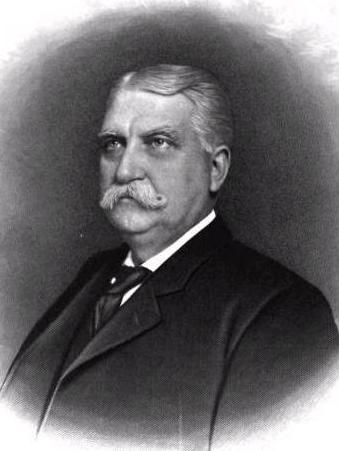

Member of the U.S. House of Representatives from Massachusetts's 4th district
- In office March 4, 1897 - March 3, 1901
- Preceded by: Lewis D. Apsley
- Succeeded by: Charles Q. Tirrell

Member of the Massachusetts House of Representatives
- In office 1896

Personal details
- Born: August 25, 1850 West Amesbury (now Merrimac, Massachusetts), U.S.
- Died: September 7, 1910 (aged 60) Bingham, Maine, U.S.
- Party: Republican
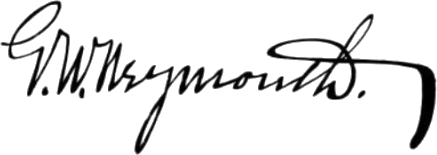
- Signature

George Warren Weymouth (August 25, 1850 – September 7, 1910) was a U.S. representative from Massachusetts.

== Early life ==
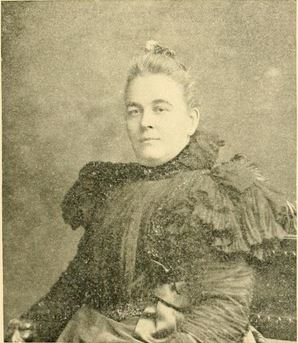
Mrs. George W. Weymouth

Born in West Amesbury (now Merrimac), Massachusetts, Weymouth attended the public schools and the Merrimac High School. He moved to Fitchburg in 1882 and engaged in the carriage business. He later became manager of the Simonds Rolling Machine Co.

== Career ==
Weymouth was trustee of the Fitchburg Savings Bank from 1891 to 1901 and director of the Fitchburg National Bank from 1892 to 1901. He was also a director in other corporations. He served as member of the common council of Fitchburg in 1886 and in the Massachusetts House of Representatives in 1896. He served as delegate to the Republican National Convention in 1896.

Weymouth was elected as a Republican to the Fifty-fifth and Fifty-sixth Congresses (March 4, 1897 – March 3, 1901). He was not a candidate for renomination in 1900.

== Later life and death ==
Following his time in Washington, he moved to Fairhaven, Massachusetts, where he served as president of the Atlas Tack Corp. from 1897 to 1910. Weymouth died in an automobile accident near Bingham, Maine, on September 7, 1910. He was interred in Riverside Cemetery in Fairhaven.

U.S. House of Representatives
Preceded by Lewis D. Apsley	Member of the U.S. House of Representatives from Massachusetts's 4th congressional district March 4, 1897 – March 3, 1901	Succeeded by Charles Q. Tirrell
