= Taylor Memorial Bridge =

Pedestrian bridge in Hudson, Massachusetts

Coordinates: 42°23′09.9″N 71°34′34.0″W

The Taylor Memorial Bridge is a double-arched reinforced concrete and cast stone pedestrian bridge that spans the Assabet River in Hudson, Massachusetts, United States. It connects Wood Park and Apsley Park, public parks across the river from each other. It was built in 1926 and is dedicated to early Hudson industrialist Thomas Taylor, Hudson soldiers who have been or may in the future be killed in action, and the twenty-five Feltonville residents who died fighting for the Union during the American Civil War.

== History ==
Thomas Taylor (1844–1923) was born in Middleton or Derby, England, where he gained experience in manufacturing elastic shoe goring and shoelaces. He immigrated to Pennsylvania in 1882 and later worked at a shoe company in Easthampton, Massachusetts. In 1888 or 1889 Taylor moved to Hudson and established his shoe factory Thomas Taylor and Sons at 49 Houghton Street in the former Brett Shoe Factory, originally built in 1874. Thomas Taylor and Sons specialized in shoe goring. The former Thomas Taylor and Sons factory building still exists as of September 2024; it is currently a self storage facility.

When Thomas Taylor died in 1923 he bequeathed $2,000 to the Town of Hudson to build a bridge connecting Wood Park and Apsley Park across the Assabet River, though it is unclear whether he pursued designs or other plans for such a bridge during his lifetime. His son Frank Taylor (1870–1949) became sole owner of the company. In 1926 Frank Taylor donated the Taylor Memorial Bridge to the Town of Hudson. The bridge was formally dedicated on June 10 or July 12, 1927.

== Design and construction ==
The Taylor Memorial Bridge spans approximately 160 feet (49 m) total over the Assabet River in two arched spans, with a central pier in the river separating the two spans. Its deck is about 6 feet (1.8 m) wide. It is made of reinforced concrete and cast stone. The pedestrian walkway is curved along the entire arched span of the bridge.

The Boston-based structural engineers J. R. Worcester and Company designed the bridge's reinforced concrete structure. Contractor G. Woodbury Parker of Hudson built the bridge. Frank Taylor claimed the Taylor Memorial Bridge's design was inspired by a single-arch bridge he saw while bicycling in the mountains of Wales as a young man. Apparently, Frank Taylor was able to reuse the 10,000 feet (3.0 km) of wooden formwork from the bridge's construction to build a six-room cottage and two-car garage at his property on Houghton Street.

When the bridge was dedicated it had two sets of bronze plaques on both the Wood Park and Apsley Park ends. The Wood Park plaques, which still exist as of September 2024, are located on both the left and right bridge posts. These bridge posts originally held tall ornamental light posts on both ends of the bridge; the light posts were vandalized and removed soon after the bridge's construction. The right Wood Park plaque reads "1926, Taylor Memorial Bridge, presented to the Town of Hudson by Thomas Taylor and Frank Taylor" and notes the bridge's engineers and contractor. The left Wood Park plaque dedicates the structure to "sons and daughters of Hudson who have in the past made the supreme sacrifice or may in the future give their lives to their country in the spirit of freedom and justice that righteousness and enlightenment may prevail throughout the world". The plaques on the Apsley Park side—since removed—memorialized the twenty-five Feltonville residents who died fighting for the Union during the American Civil War.

== See also ==
- Col. Adelbert Mossman House
