= Hudson High School (Massachusetts) =

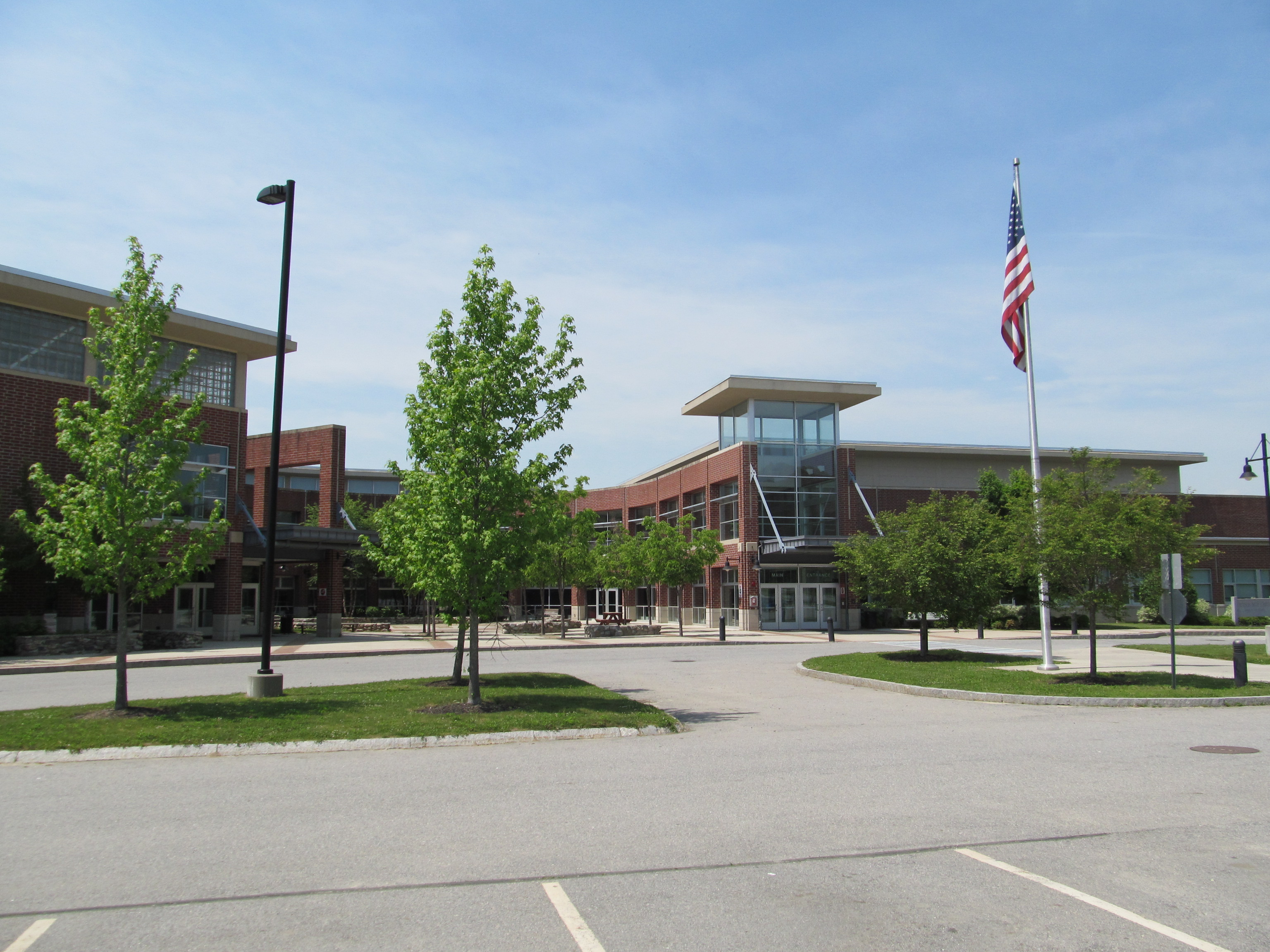
- Hudson High School

Location
- 69 Brigham Street; Hudson, Massachusetts 01749; United States
- Coordinates: 42°22′49″N 71°34′48″W

Information
- Type: Public; Open enrollment
- Founded: 1867; 159 years ago
- School district: Hudson Public Schools
- Superintendent: Brian K. Reagan
- Principal: Lauren Pupecki
- Faculty: 78.40
- Grades: 8–12
- Gender: Coeducational
- Enrollment: 748 (2025-2026)
- Student to teacher ratio: 10.32
- Campus type: Suburban
- Colors: red white
- Athletics conference: Midland Wachusett League
- Mascot: Hawk
- Team name: Hudson Hawks
- Rival: Marlborough High School
- Accreditation: NEASC
- Website: hhs.hudson.k12.ma.us

Hudson High School (HHS) is a public high school located in Hudson, Massachusetts, United States. It is administered by the Hudson Public Schools system and serves grades 8 through 12. The current principal is Lauren Pupecki.

== History ==
The first high school building in Hudson was built in 1867, only one year after the town itself was incorporated. The building, located on High Street, was used as the high school until 1882. After that it was used as an elementary school for a number of years. The two-story wood building still stands, now housing the Hudson Animal Hospital.

The second high school, a two-story brick building known as the Felton Street School, was completed in 1882 and served as the high school until 1956. It was then used as a grade school for some time until being remodeled into a condominium complex. It is still standing and was added to the National Register of Historic Places in 1986.

A new high school was built in 1956 on Packard Street after the Felton Street School became too small. This new building was used as the high school until 1970, when it was replaced. It was the town's middle school for a short time and was renamed the Carmela A. Farley School after a long-time Hudson teacher. The school became an elementary school and was remodeled in 1999. Its main entrance is now on Cottage Street.

The building that replaced the one on Packard Street was completed in 1970 and was located on Brigham Street. It served as the high school until about 2004, when it was knocked down and replaced by a modern multimillion-dollar school.

The newest and current Hudson High School building was finished in 2004, replacing the 1970 high school located on the same Brigham Street site. In order to construct the new building it was built behind the previous building, where school was kept in session during construction. Once construction of the new building finished, the old building was demolished and a new parking lot built in its stead. The former parking lot was also demolished to make way for a practice football field. In addition to the practice field, six renovated tennis courts, two baseball/softball fields, and a clubhouse for the Hudson High School Athletics Booster Club were also built as part of the project.

== Academics ==
Hudson High School has a counseling program to assist students in reaching their academic potential. The school also offers comprehensive courses in the following areas of study:

- English Language Arts: Creative Writing I & II, Reader's & Writer's Workshop, Critical Media Literacy, Understanding Linguistics, Journalism I, II & III, Coming-of-Age Literature, Dystopian Literature
- Mathematics: 8th Grade Math, Algebra I & II, Geometry, Statistics, Pre-Calculus, Calculus, Functions & Operations, Essential Math.
- Science: 8th Grade Science, Biology, Chemistry, Physics, Anatomy & Physiology I & II, Environmental Science, Genetics, Forensic/DNA Science, Invertebrate Zoology, Earth Science & Natural History, Essentials of Physical Science
- Social Studies: U.S. & The World History I, II & III, Ethics, Sociology, Global Citizenship & Humanitarian Aid, World Cultures, Contemporary Legal issues, Social Justice, Psychology, Abnormal Psychology, Histories of World Regions, Economic Theories, Contemporary World Issues, Conflict Resolution
- Business: Accounting I, Business Management, Introduction to Marketing, Personal Finance in Today's Economy
- Technology: Computer Animation, Computer Design & Production, Web 2.0/Cloud Computing, Robotics with LEGO Mindstorms, Robotic Design, Introduction to CAD, PLTW Engineering, Introduction To Engineering & Design, Principles of Engineering, Digital Electronics, Engineering Development & Design, Digital Imaging & Design, Graphic Design I, Architectural & Interior Design, Video Game Design & Development I & II, Web Design, Exploring Mobil App Creation for Web Designers, Computer Programming I, Media, TV News, Video Animation
- World Languages: Spanish I, II, III, IV & V, Portuguese I, II, III, IV, V, French
- Visual Arts: Art I, II, III & IV, Studio Art, Pottery I & II, Darkroom Photography I & II, Art History, Intro to Creative Fashion Design), *Performing Arts: Drama I & II, Advanced Theatre Studies, Musical Theatre, Keyboard I & II, Chorus I & II, Concert Band, Wind Ensemble, Music Theory I),
- AP Capstone Seminar & Research,
- Wellness, Health & Physical Education,
- Early Childhood Education and Care: Child Growth & Development, Early Childhood Education I & II

The school also offers online courses through Virtual High School.

Advanced Placement courses include:

- AP Seminar
- AP Research
- AP Biology
- AP Calculus AB
- AP Calculus BC
- AP Chemistry
- AP English Language and Composition
- AP Environmental Science
- AP Music Theory
- AP Physics
- AP Psychology
- AP Spanish
- AP Statistics
- AP Studio Art
- AP U.S. Government & Politics
- AP U.S. History

=== School Choice ===
Hudson High School participates in the Massachusetts School Choice Program. This program allows students living in neighboring towns to attend Hudson High School, and for students living in Hudson to attend public high school in other towns.

== Athletics ==
Hudson High School's athletic teams are known as the Hudson Hawks, and the school's mascot is the Hudson Hawk. Hudson's longtime athletic rival is the neighboring city of Marlborough, especially in football. Every Thanksgiving the two rivals compete in a "Turkey Day" football game, alternating home-field advantage each year. Hudson has won the last three Turkey Day games by scores of 41-0 in 2023, 33-14 in 2024, and 25-6 in 2025. The rivalry traces its origins back to at least 1906.

The Hudson varsity football team appeared in the Central Massachusetts Super Bowl in 1974, 1981, 1982, 1991, 2010, and 2011, winning the Super Bowl in 1991 by defeating Bartlett High School by a score of 35-14. In 2023, the football team finished at 9-3, reaching the state semi-final game losing to Fairhaven by a score of 40-37. In 2024, the football team went 13-0 to capture the MIAA State Championship by defeating Fairhaven at Gillette Stadium by a score of 21-14. In 2025, the football team went 10-2, once again reaching the state semi-final game, losing to Norwell High School by a score of 21-7.

In 2012 the Hudson boys' varsity hockey team went 23-1-1 to capture the MIAA State Championship, defeating Medway at the TD Garden by a score of 5-1.

The Hudson varsity baseball team reached the state finals in 1999, 2002, 2006, and 2011, winning the MIAA State Championship in 1999 and 2002.

The Hudson varsity softball team reached the state finals in 2006, 2007, 2008, 2009, 2010, 2019, and 2024, winning the MIAA State Championship in 2007, 2010 and 2019.

Currently Hudson High School fields 19 teams in the following sports:

- Fall
  - Boys' & Girls' Cross Country
  - Boys' & Girls' Soccer
  - Football
  - Field hockey
  - Volleyball
  - Dance
  - Cheerleading
  - Golf
- Winter
  - Boys' & Girls' Basketball
  - Boys' & Girls' Hockey (Girls are co-op with Algonquin Regional High School in Northborough)
  - Boys' & Girls' Indoor Track
  - Gymnastics
  - Cheerleading
  - Swimming (co-op with Nashoba Regional High School in Bolton)
  - Wrestling (co-op with Keefe Regional Technical High School in Framingham)
- Spring
  - Baseball
  - Softball
  - Boys' & Girls' Lacrosse
  - Boys' & Girls' Tennis
  - Boys' & Girls' Outdoor Track
  - Unified Track
  - Co-Ed Ultimate Frisbee (club)

== Notable alumni ==
- Burton Kendall Wheeler – Class of 1900 – former U.S. senator from Montana
- William C. Sullivan – Class of 1930 – former head of FBI intelligence operations
- Charles Precourt – Class of 1973 – retired United States Air Force colonel and astronaut
- Nuno Bettencourt – Class of 1985 – guitarist for the rock band Extreme
- Hugo Ferreira – Class of 1992 – singer-songwriter for the band Tantric
- Matt Burke – Class of 1994 – defensive coordinator for the Houston Texans.
- Evan Markopoulos – Class of 2012 – professional wrestler
- Thomas P. Salmon – former Governor of Vermont
