= Lewis D. Apsley =

American politician and businessman (1852-1925)

Lewis Dewart Apsley
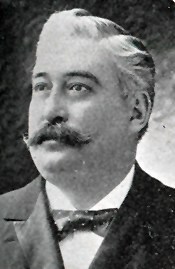

Member of the U.S. House of Representatives from Massachusetts's 4th district
- In office March 4, 1893 – March 3, 1897
- Preceded by: Joseph H. O'Neil
- Succeeded by: George W. Weymouth

Personal details
- Born: September 29, 1852 Northumberland, Pennsylvania, U.S.
- Died: April 11, 1925 (aged 72) Colón, Panama
- Resting place: Forestvale Cemetery; Hudson, Massachusetts
- Party: Republican
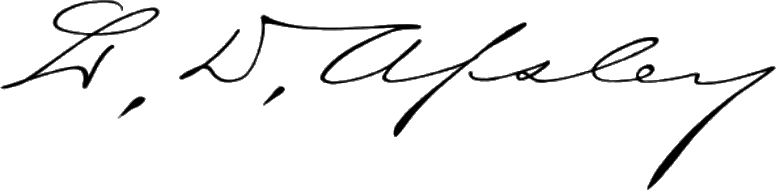
- Signature

Lewis Dewart Apsley (September 29, 1852 – April 11, 1925) was a businessman and U.S. Representative from Massachusetts.

== Biography ==
Born in Northumberland, Pennsylvania, Apsley moved with his parents to Lock Haven, Pennsylvania, in 1861. He attended public and private schools. He moved to Philadelphia and engaged in business, particularly the rubber goods trade. He moved to Boston in 1877 and became a manufacturer of rubber clothing in Hudson, Massachusetts, in 1885, founding and serving as president of the Apsley Rubber Company (later the Firestone-Apsley Rubber Company). Apsley served as president of the Hudson Board of Trade and a director of the Hudson National Bank.

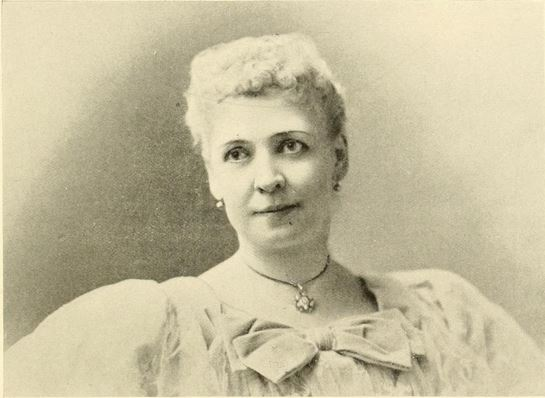
Laura Marguerite Remington

Apsley married Laura Marguerite Remington, a native Philadelphian, in 1873. She was the youngest daughter of Captain John S. Remington, a descendant of an old Philadelphia family. Laura Remington spent her early life in Philadelphia. She was much loved by a large coterie of friends and many admirers, among whom was Lewis Dewart Apsley, then an active young businessman of Philadelphia. The newlyweds resided in Philadelphia for a few years before moving to Boston, Massachusetts, in 1877 and finally to Hudson, Massachusetts, in 1883. Their only son Willie George Apsley died in 1880.

Apsley was elected as a Republican to the Fifty-third and Fifty-fourth Congresses, serving between March 4, 1893 and March 3, 1897. He served as chairman of the Committee on Manufactures during the Fifty-fourth Congress and two terms as vice chairman of the National Republican Congressional Committee. He declined to run for renomination in 1896, instead resuming his business pursuits in Hudson.

When Laura Apsley died in 1914 her companion Abigail (Abbie) Fobes Aldrich Black—widow of a favorite cousin, Victor F. Black—had run the Apsley household for nearly 20 years. Due to the morals of the time, Abigail had to move out or marry Lewis Apsley to keep her place. They married on May 1, 1915. Abigail and Lewis traveled to Europe together several times and enjoyed his remaining years together.

Apsley died in Colón, Panama, on April 11, 1925, and was buried in Forestvale Cemetery in Hudson.

U.S. House of Representatives
Preceded by Joseph H. O'Neil	Member of the U.S. House of Representatives from Massachusetts's 4th congressional district March 4, 1893 – March 3, 1897	Succeeded by George W. Weymouth
