= Hudson Public Schools =

Puhlic school system

Coordinates: 42°23′46.12″N 71°34′07.69″W

Location
- 155 Apsley Street; Hudson, MA 01749

District information
- Type: Public
- Grades: PK-12
- Superintendent: Dr. Brian Reagan
- Schools: 5
- Budget: $44,001,824 (2015)

Students and staff
- Students: 2,643
- Teachers: 263.3
- Student–teacher ratio: 11.2 to 1

Other information
- Website: Hudson Public Schools

The Hudson Public Schools District is a coalition of public schools located in Hudson, Middlesex County, Massachusetts. The superintendent of Hudson Public Schools is Dr. Brian Reagan. The Hudson Public Schools' office is located at 155 Apsley Street in Hudson in the former Harriman Grammar School building.

== Elementary Schools (grades K-4) ==
- Camela A. Farley Elementary School is a public elementary school that serves grades K through 4. It was built in 1956 and was named after long-time Hudson educator Camela A. Farley. The building has also served as the high school and the middle school. The principal is Tawanna Johnson and the assistant principal is Anne Duke.
- Joseph L. Mulready Elementary School is a public elementary school built in 1965, that serves grades K through 4. It was originally named the Cox Street School after the street it is located on, but was renamed after former Hudson superintendent Joseph L. Mulready. The principal is Kelly Sardella.
- Forest Avenue Elementary School is a public elementary school that serves grades K through 4. It was completed in 1975 and is named after Forest Avenue, the street it is located on. The principal is David Champigny and the assistant principal is Lara Beach.

== Middle Schools (grades 5-7) ==
- David J. Quinn Middle School is a middle school serving grades 5, 6 and 7. Quinn Middle School replaced John F. Kennedy Middle School, which built in 1963, and was demolished over the summer in 2013. Quinn Middle School was ready by the first day of school for the class of 2013-14. The principal is Timothy Frazier and the vice principal is Matt Gaffny.

== High Schools (grades 8-12) ==
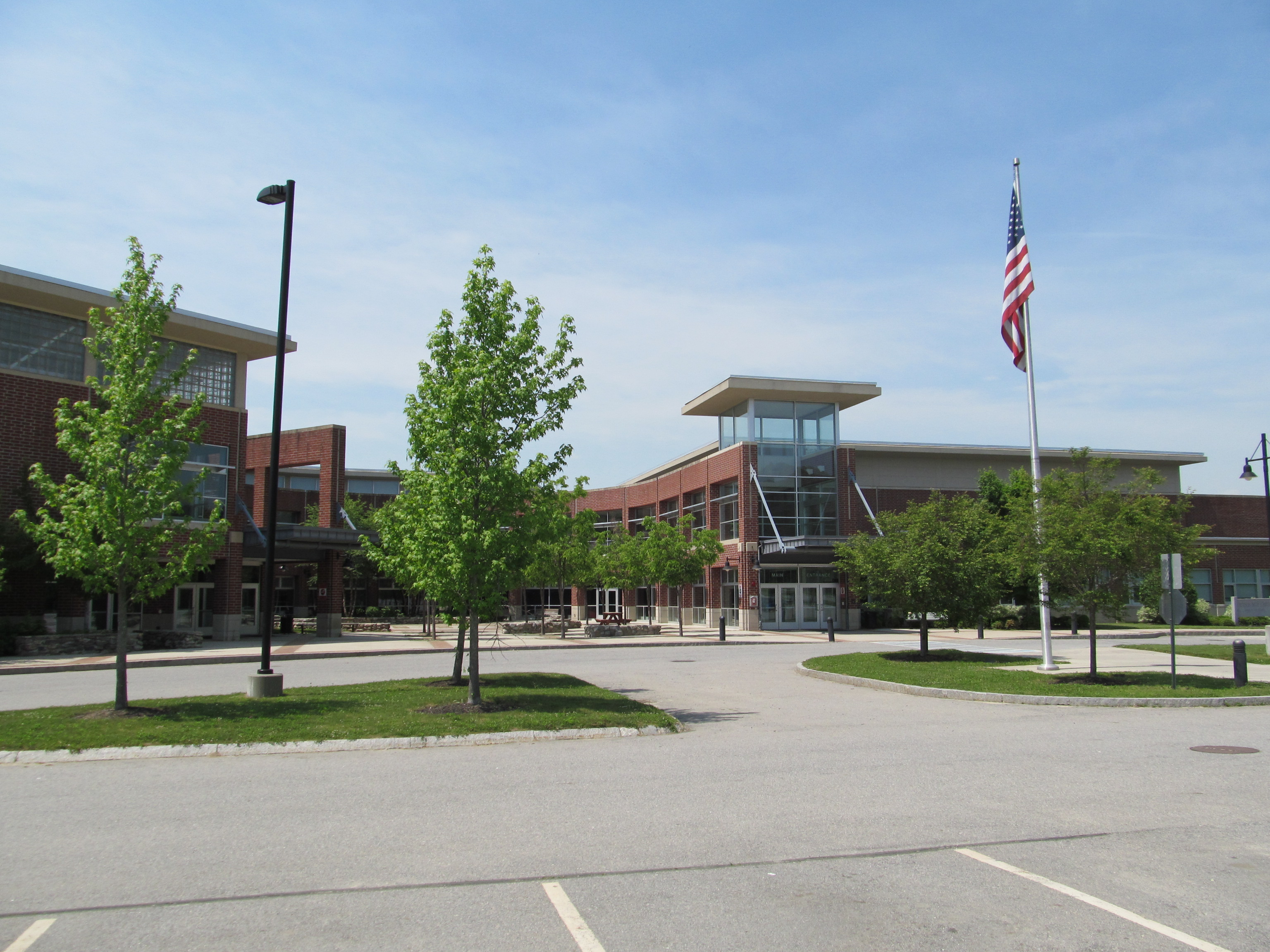
Hudson High School

- Hudson High School, or HHS, is a public high school that serves grades 8 through 12. The new multi-million-dollar building was finished in 2004, the same year the old building, which was built in 1970, and was demolished. The principal is Lauren Pupecki and the assistant principals are Jennifer Chernisky, for upperclassmen, and Daniel McAnespie, for grades eight and nine.

== Former Schools (in Chronological Order) ==
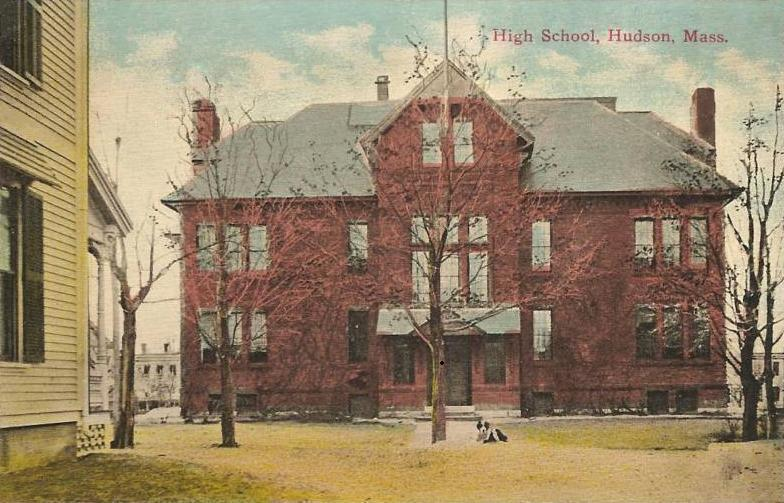
Felton Street School depicted on a 1912 postcard

- The School Street Schoolhouse was built in 1854 and abandoned in 1925. It was located on School Street.
- The Old Broad Street School was built in 1867 and used until 1924. The New Broad Street School was built at the same site and was used until damaged by a fire. The new building, Cora Hubert Kindergarten Center replaced it at the same site.
- The High Street Elementary School built in 1867, and once was Hudson’s first high school, later an elementary school, is located at 30 High Street, and now is the Hudson Animal Hospital.
- The Old Green Street School was built in 1878 and was located on Green Street. It was used until 1924, when it was demolished to make way for a private residence.
- The Felton Street School was built in 1882 and served as the town's high school until 1957. In 1986, the school was added to the National Register of Historic Places.
- The Harriman Grammar School was built in 1892, and is located on the corner of Lake and Apsley Streets. It not only served as a grammar school but early years was the high school. The building currently houses the administrative offices of the Hudson Public Schools District. It was named after Dr. James Lang Harriman (1833–1907), a 40-year-long Hudson physician and surgeon who also served on the Hudson School Committee for 38 years.
- The Linden Street School was built in 1924 to replace the Old Green Street School; this makes sense location-wise, as Linden Street is located off of Green Street. The Linden Street School building still exists today as a condominium complex.
- The Packard Street School was also built in 1924, and is located on Packard Street. The building housed the Hudson Police Department until the completion of their new headquarters in 2017. The site is earmarked to be redeveloped for housing.
- The Cora Hubert Kindergarten Center was a kindergarten center that operated from 1992 to 2012, when the kindergarten closed permanently. Kindergartners now attend the elementary schools. The former kindergarten is used for preschool programs.
