= Felton Street School =

- U.S. National Register of Historic Places
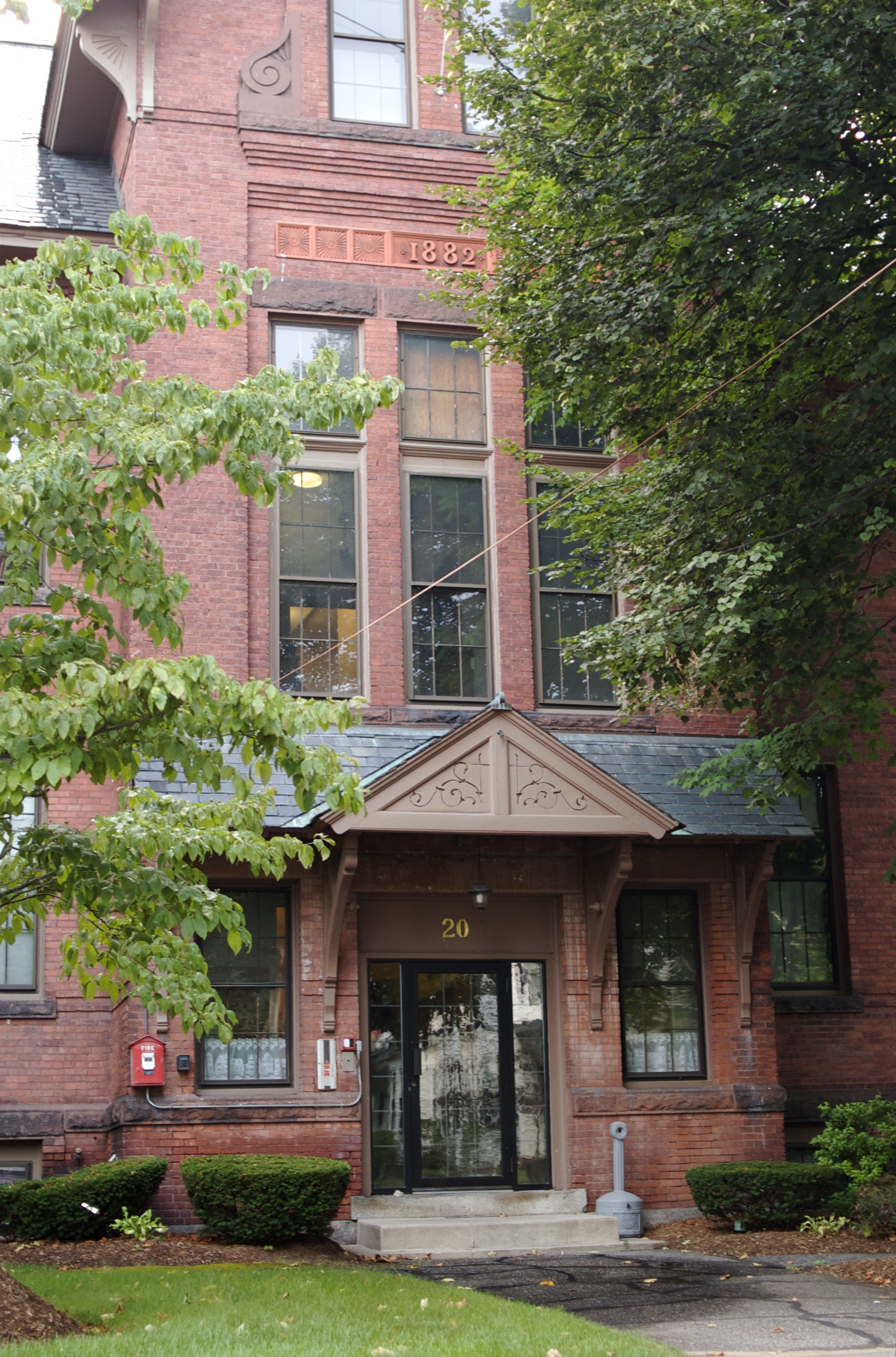

- Location within Massachusetts Location within the United States
- Location: 20 Felton Street, Hudson, Massachusetts
- Coordinates: 42°23′34″N 71°34′10″W
- Built: 1882
- Architect: Fuller & Delano
- Architectural style: Gothic, Queen Anne
- NRHP reference No.: 86000275
- Added to NRHP: February 27, 1986

The Felton Street School is a historic school building built in 1882 located at 20 Felton Street in Hudson, Massachusetts, United States. The 2 1/2-story brick-and-stone structure served as the town's high school until 1957. Today it is a residential apartment building. The building's design and ornamentation is typical of Queen Anne and Stick style architecture. It is listed on the National Register of Historic Places.

== History ==
Architects Fuller & Delano designed the Felton Street School. Construction costs totaled $15,000. It opened in 1882 as the new Hudson High School and served in that capacity until 1957. In 1901 the originally four-room school was expanded to eight rooms. Local merchants published and sold postcards depicting the Felton Street School during the early 1900s.

When the Hudson and Massachusetts Historical Commissions inventoried the building as a historic property in 1978, they described its use as both "mental health facility" and "vacant," noting recent vandalism. Since then the building has been renovated into 12 loft-style apartments.

The building was listed on the National Register of Historic Places on February 27, 1986.

== Architecture ==
The Felton Street School's plan is T-shaped. The building's foundation is granite. Its front façade has a projecting three-story gabled pavilion with large brackets at the roof corners and applied Stick style decoration—including a rising sun motif—in the gable. A portico supported by similar large brackets shelters the main entrance set in this pavilion. Six-over-six triple-paned rectangular windows punctuate the structural brick exterior walls on the front and side façades, while the rear façade has arched windows. The window sills and lintels are made of brownstone. The detailed brick cornice is corbelled and the building's chimneys have Queen Anne style ornamentation. The school's original hipped slate roof contains hipped dormers also sheathed with slate.

== See also ==
- Hudson High School (Massachusetts)
- Hudson Public Schools
- National Register of Historic Places listings in Middlesex County, Massachusetts
