= William B. Rice =

American industrialist (1840–1909)

- William Ball Rice c. 1900
- Born: April 1, 1840; Hudson, Massachusetts, United States
- Died: May 21, 1909 (aged 69); Quincy, Massachusetts, United States
- Known for: Founding and presidency of Rice & Hutchins
- Spouse: Emma Louise Cunningham (m. 1860)
- Children: Harry Lee Rice (1862-1951); Fred Ball Rice (1866-1933); William Ball Rice Jr. (1872-1872); Mary Sanborn Rice Bigelow (b. 1874)

William Ball Rice (April 1, 1840 – May 21, 1909) was an American industrialist who co-founded Rice & Hutchins, a shoe manufacturing company with main offices in Boston, Massachusetts. He served as president of the company from its founding in 1866 until his death.

== Early life and military service ==
William Ball Rice was born April 1, 1840, in Hudson, Massachusetts, to Obed Rice (1810–1890) and Sarah Maria (Ball) Rice (1816–1895). Rice was educated in the public schools in Massachusetts and apprenticed as a shoemaker in Marlborough, Massachusetts, until he reached 21 years of age. He married Emma Louise Cunningham of Marlborough on October 25, 1860, and they had four children. From 1861 to 1864 he served in the Union Army as a second lieutenant in Company E, 5th Massachusetts Volunteer Infantry Regiment, serving in Baltimore, Washington D.C. and North Carolina. Between 1865 and 1866, he served as a sales agent to the U.S. military for the L. T. Jefts shoe manufacturer in Marlborough.

== Business career ==
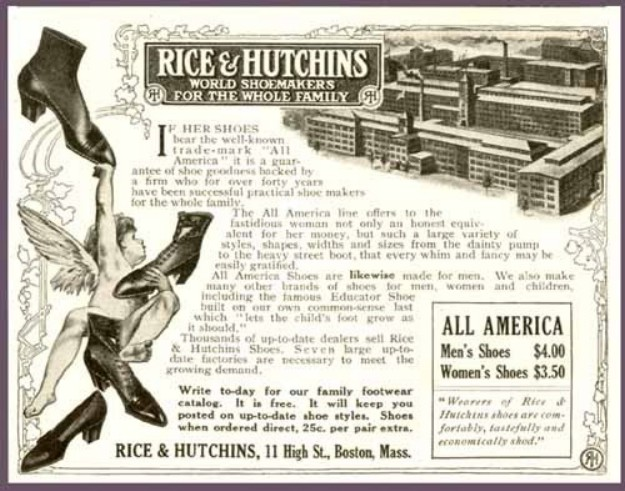
Print advertisement from Rice & Hutchins, Inc. 1907

In October 1866, Rice and his partner and neighbor from Hudson, Massachusetts, Horatio H. Hutchins, began the Rice and Hutchins Shoe Company with sales offices in Boston, and a factory in Marlborough, Massachusetts. By the time of the company's founding, Marlborough had built a reputation in shoe and boot making to supply the Union Army during the American Civil War. In the first twenty years of the company, Rice and Hutchins established shoe factories in Warren, Maine, and Rockland, Massachusetts, four factories in Marlboro, Massachusetts, a factory in Boston, and their first wholesale distribution warehouse outside New England in Philadelphia. After Hutchins retired from the company in 1885, Rice led the further expansion of the company by adding more factories in Quincy, Braintree, and Yonkers, New York. He also expanded the distribution capability of the company by opening wholesale houses in St. Louis, Cincinnati, Atlanta, and Chicago. He also was responsible for developing international sales by establishing offices in London, Berlin, and Manila. He led the initial incorporation of the company in 1892 under the laws of New Jersey, and later the reorganization and incorporation of the company in Maine in 1905. At the time of Rice's death in Quincy on March 21, 1909, the company was among the largest shoe manufacturers in the United States.

During his career Rice was engaged in a number of civic and philanthropic pursuits. In 1894, Governor Frederic T. Greenhalge appointed him to the governor's council of business advisers and he was a major benefactor of the Quincy City Hospital. When Rice's wife, Mrs. Emma Louise Rice died in 1934 she left the family home and grounds at 215 Adams St. in Quincy to the William B. Rice Eventide Home, a non-profit, nursing home corporation.

== The Rice family and genealogy ==
William B. Rice had four children. His eldest sons Harry Lee Rice and Fred Ball Rice ran the family shoe manufacturing business after his death until they retired and sold the business in 1929. Harry Rice was born July 28, 1862, in Hudson, MA, and was married to Frances Austin Manson in 1900. They had three children: William Ball Rice II (1901–1964), Benjamin Manson Rice (1902–1978), and Edmund Rice (1905–1961). Harry Rice died March 5, 1951, in Quincy. Fred B. Rice was born July 14, 1866, in Hudson, and was unmarried. He died February 11, 1933, at the family home in Quincy. Rice's third son William Ball Rice Jr. died in infancy in 1872. His daughter Mary Sanborn Rice was born February 12, 1874, in Quincy, and was married to portrait painter Homer Lane Bigelow (1868–1955) in 1896. They resided at 37 Old Orchard Road in the Chestnut Hill section of Newton, MA, and had three children – Priscilla Rice (Bigelow) Trainer (b. 1898), Homer Lane Bigelow, Jr. (1899–1967), and Malcolm R. Bigelow (1906–1945).

William Ball Rice was a direct descendant of Edmund Rice, an English immigrant to Massachusetts Bay Colony, as follows:

- William Ball Rice, son of

- Obed Rice (1810–1890), son of

- Ithamar Rice (1743–1824), son of
- Matthias Rice (born 1708, date of death unknown), son of

- Gershom Rice (1667–1768), son of
- Thomas Rice (1638–1681), son of

- Edmund Rice (1594–1663)
