= Firestone-Apsley Rubber Company =

Defunct company and existing factory building in Hudson, Massachusetts, United States

Coordinates: 42°23′41.69″N 71°34′34.1″W

Firestone–Apsley Rubber Company
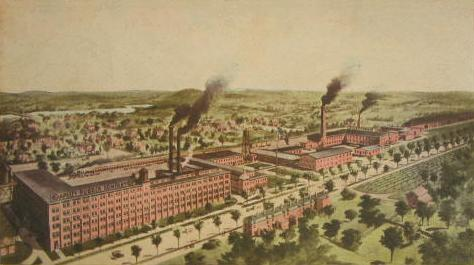
- The Apsley Rubber Company in 1911
- Industry: Rubber
- Predecessors: Goodyear Gossamer Company; Apsley Rubber Company
- Founded: 1885; 141 years ago in Hudson, Massachusetts, United States
- Founders: Lewis Dewart Apsley, J. H. Coffin
- Defunct: 1930s
- Fate: Folded during the Great Depression
- Successors: Victory Plastics; Hudson Lock, LLC
- Parent: Firestone Tire and Rubber Company

The Firestone–Apsley Rubber Company was a tire company and factory located in Hudson, Massachusetts, United States. It succeeded the rubber clothing companies Apsley Rubber Company and Goodyear Gossamer Company. It operated in its various guises from 1885 to the 1930s. Today the Firestone–Apsley factory building is owned by Hudson Lock, LLC, which produces keys, locks, and related goods.

== History ==
The Goodyear Gossamer Company was founded in 1885 in Hudson, Massachusetts, by businessman and later United States congressman Lewis Dewart Apsley and his partner J. H. Coffin of Boston. This company produced rubber or "gossamer" clothing. Within five years, Goodyear Gossamer Company became the largest producer of gossamer garments in the nation.

In 1892 Apsley purchased Coffin's share of Goodyear Gossamer and reincorporated it as the Apsley Rubber Company. This company produced rubber clothing and footwear. Apsley expanded the company's brick factory building in 1916. The plant employed between 1200 and 2000 people during its existence, more than half of all people employed in Hudson during that time period.

In 1921 Apsley sold his company and factory buildings to the Firestone Tire and Rubber Company. The plant was renamed the Firestone–Apsley Rubber Company and started producing tires. A new 150-foot (46 m) brick smokestack with the word "FIRESTONE" spelled out on it in white-painted bricks was built by the Firestone Company. The factory helped attract immigrants from all over Europe to Hudson. In 1928 at least 19 different languages were spoken by Firestone-Apsley workers. The factory folded in the 1930s during the Great Depression.

From the 1940s through 1960s the former Firestone–Apsley factory buildings housed Victory Plastics. This company produced plastic footwear and 18 million plastic scabbards for knives and machetes during World War II. Victory Plastics was recognized with an Army-Navy "E" Award for its contributions to the war effort. Victory continued producing scabbards and other war materiel for use during the Korean War, including plastic-encased land mines designed in collaboration with Dow Chemical Company. The company also added various plastic consumer goods such as thermal cocktail pitchers and condiment sets to their production line.

Since 1963 the plant has housed Hudson Lock, LLC, which produces keys, locks, locksmithing tools, and related goods.

The Firestone smokestack still stands. It is quite possibly the tallest structure in the town of Hudson, but is now shorter than its original 150-foot (46 m) height. Sometime in 2017 the smokestack was damaged – or perhaps intentionally lowered for safety reasons – such that it now reads "IRESTONE."

== See also ==
- Firestone Tire and Rubber Company
