= Charles Q. Tirrell =

American politician (1844–1910)

Charles Quincy Tirrell
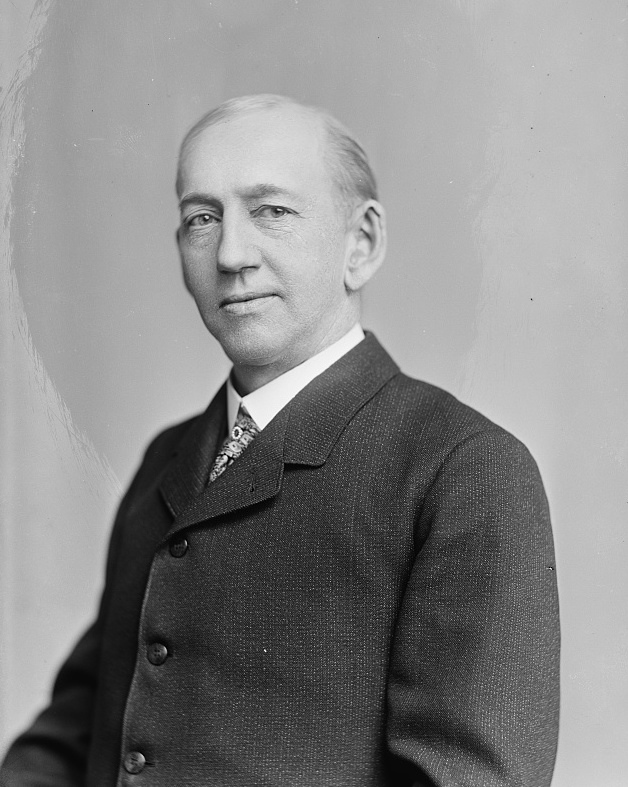
- Charles Q. Tirrell c. 1905

Member of the U.S. House of Representatives from Massachusetts's 4th district
- In office March 4, 1901 – July 31, 1910
- Preceded by: George W. Weymouth
- Succeeded by: John Joseph Mitchell

Member of the Massachusetts Senate
- In office 1881–1882

Member of the Massachusetts House of Representatives
- In office 1872–1872

Presidential Elector
- In office 1888–1888

Personal details
- Born: December 10, 1844 Sharon, Massachusetts, U.S.
- Died: July 31, 1910 (aged 65) Natick, Massachusetts, U.S.
- Party: Republican
- Education: Dartmouth
- Profession: Attorney

Charles Quincy Tirrell (December 10, 1844 – July 31, 1910) was a lawyer, educator, and U.S. representative from Massachusetts.

== Biography ==
Born in Sharon, Massachusetts, Tirrell attended public schools and later studied law at Dartmouth College, graduating in 1866. He served as principal of Peacham Academy in Peacham, Vermont, for one year, and of St. Johnsbury High School for two years. He was admitted to the bar in 1870 and commenced practice in Boston, Massachusetts. He served as a member of the Massachusetts House of Representatives in 1872. He moved to Natick, Massachusetts, in 1873. He served in the Massachusetts Senate in 1881 and 1882.

A "past grand master of the grand lodge, Independent Order of Odd Fellows, of Massachusetts," Tirrell was elected as a Republican to the Fifty-seventh and to the four succeeding Congresses, serving from March 4, 1901, until his death in Natick on July 31, 1910. He was interred in Dell Park Cemetery.

== See also ==
- 1872 Massachusetts legislature
- 1881 Massachusetts legislature
- List of members of the United States Congress who died in office (1900–1949)

== Bibliography ==
- Who's who in State Politics, 1908 Practical Politics (1908) p. 21.
- United States Congress. "Charles Q. Tirrell (id: T000287)". Biographical Directory of the United States Congress.
- Charles Q. Tirrell, late a representative from Massachusetts, Memorial addresses delivered in the House of Representatives and Senate frontispiece 1911

U.S. House of Representatives
| Preceded by George W. Weymouth | Member of the U.S. House of Representatives from Massachusetts's 4th congressional district March 4, 1901 – July 31, 1910 | Succeeded by John J. Mitchell |
