= Union Church of All Faiths =

Building in Hudson, Massachusetts

Coordinates: 42°22′53″N 71°32′14″W

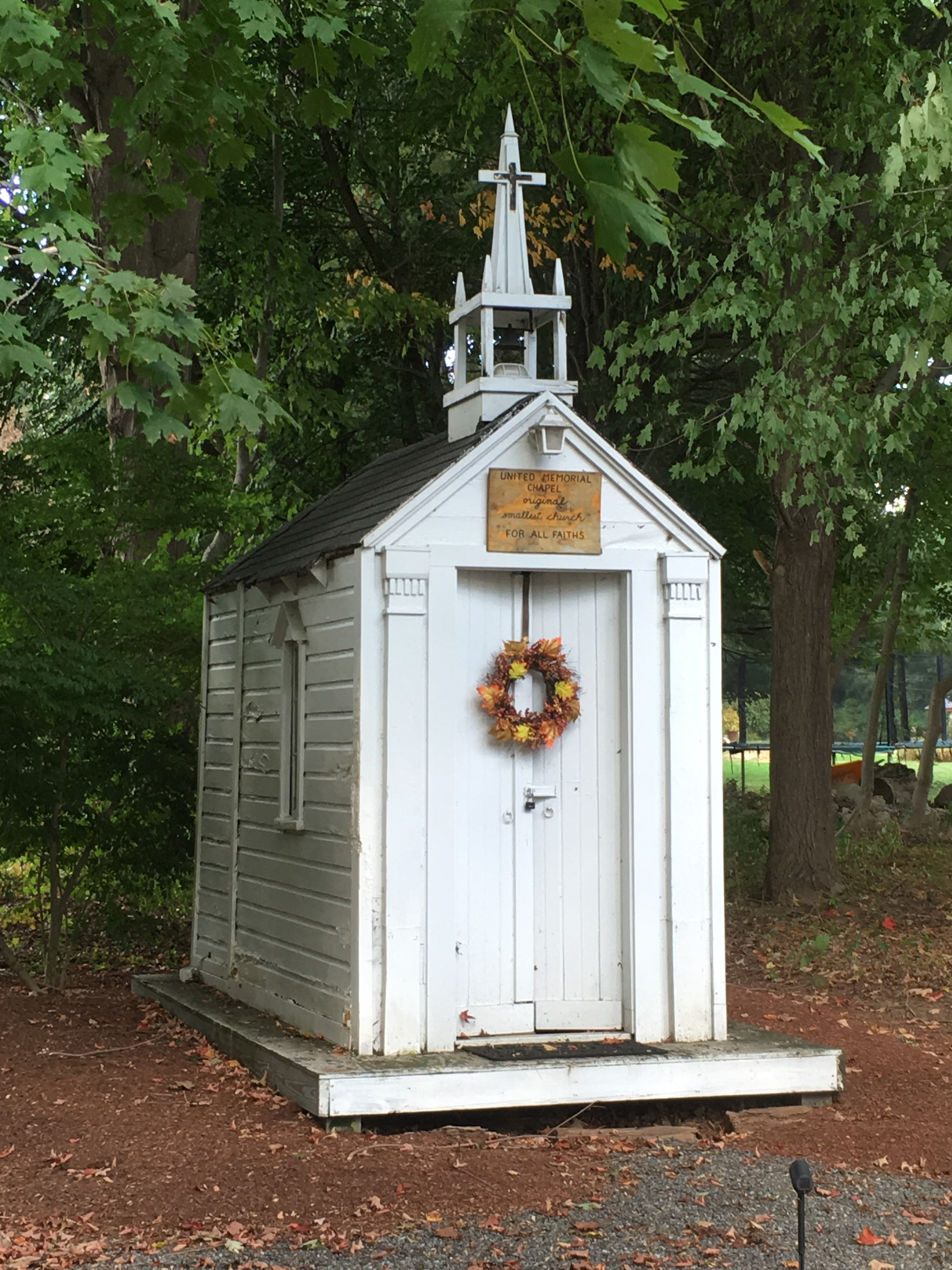
Union Church of All Faiths

The Union Church of All Faiths, also known as the United Memorial Chapel for All Faiths, is a 5-foot (1.5 m) by 11-foot (3.4 m) wood-framed chapel located in Hudson, Massachusetts, United States. It is occasionally cited as the "smallest church in the United States." However, smaller and older "tiny churches" exist in the United States, too. Retired clergyman Rev. Louis Winthrop West (1885–1966) built the chapel beside his own home on Central Street.

Around 1951, West remodeled a streetcar waiting room into a chapel, which was sold off when he had a spate of poor health. In 1953, he built the existing structure. The building's interior fits four people, although 100 people sometimes gathered outside for religious services, including weddings. In the 1970s, it was moved to the grounds of the First Federated Church of Hudson, where it was located for many years. In 2003, former Hudson resident Vic Petkauskos bought the chapel, relocated it to Hyannis, Massachusetts, and renovated it. He planned to place it on a barge and hold wedding ceremonies off the coast of Cape Cod, although whether he ever did so is unclear. The church still exists. At some point, it made its way back to Hudson from Hyannis. It is currently located on private property on Causeway Street in Hudson, where it is visible from the road.

In 1958, a second church (now dismantled) was built in Wiscasset, Maine on the property of West's granddaughter. According to West, both churches were intended as a roadside attraction to give him an opportunity to talk with passers-by.
