= Gleasondale, Massachusetts =

Village in Massachusetts, United States

Coordinates: 42°24′22″N 71°31′36″W

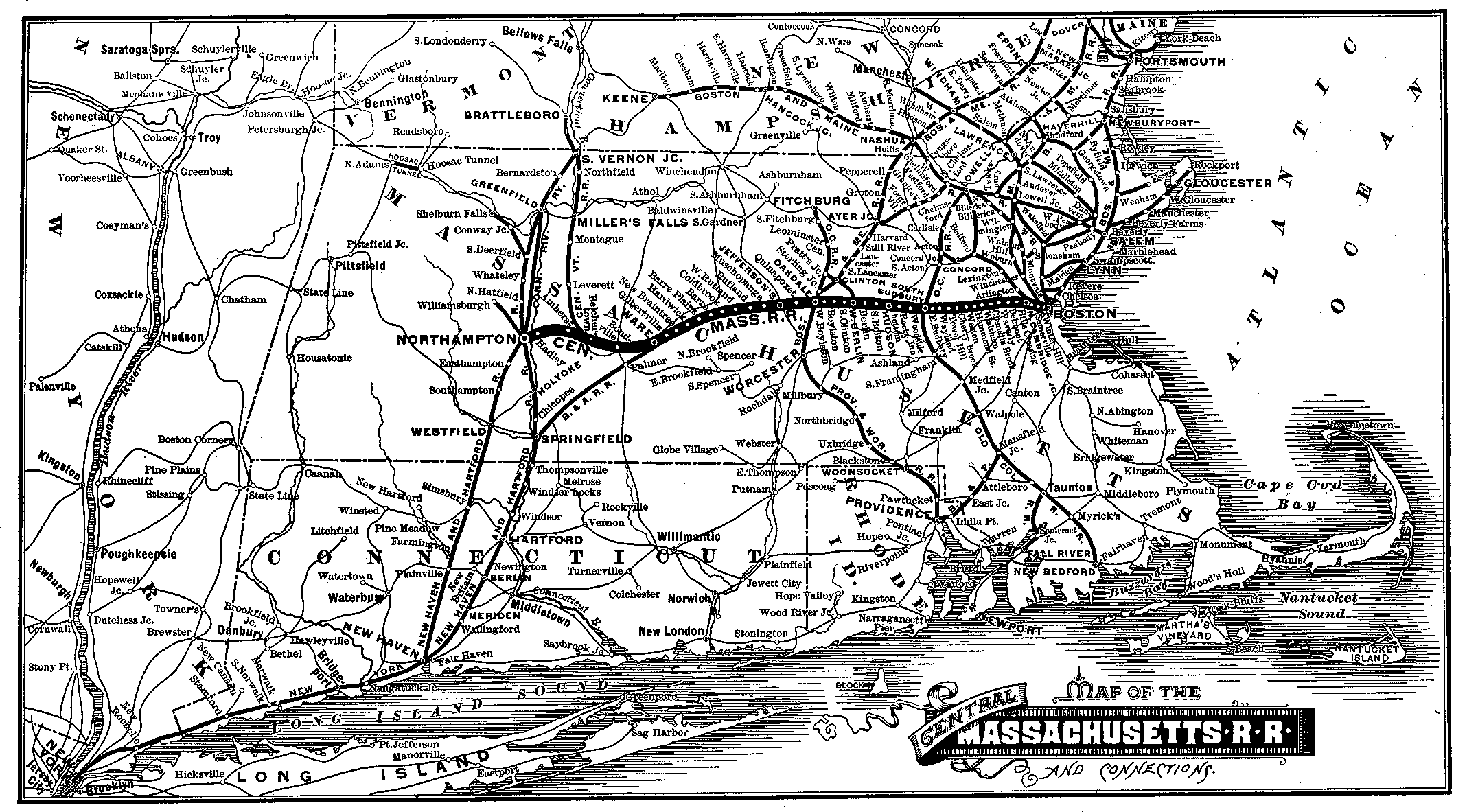
1888 Central Massachusetts Railroad map

Gleasondale is a village straddling the border between the towns of Hudson and Stow in Middlesex County, Massachusetts, United States. It is located along the Assabet River. For many decades it was home to various mills, though it is now primarily residential. According to the Geographic Names Information System (GNIS), Gleasondale is a "populated place" named after Benjamin W. Gleason and Samuel J. Dale.

== History ==
Indigenous people lived in what became central Massachusetts for thousands of years prior to European settlement. Indigenous oral histories, archaeological evidence, and European settler documents attest to historic settlements of the Nipmuc people near and along the Assabet River. Nipmuc settlements on the Assabet intersected with the territories of three other related Algonquian-speaking peoples: the Massachusett, Pennacook, and Wampanoag.

European settlement in what would become Gleasondale began around 1750 when a certain Whitman family and Ebenezer Graves constructed a dam and lumber mill on the Assabet River. The Whitmans—who owned the land and mills—sold them to Timothy Gibson in 1770, who in turn sold them to Abraham Randall a few years later. For many years the area was known as Randall's Mills. In 1813 the Rock Bottom Cotton & Woolen Company built a wood-framed textile mill at Randall's Mills and the emerging village and new post office became known as Rock Bottom. In 1815 Randall sold the mill to Joel Cranston and Silas Felton, business partners based in Feltonville, a village of Marlborough, Massachusetts, which would later become the town of Hudson. In 1830 Cranston and Felton sold the mill to Benjamin Poor. In 1849 business partners Benjamin W. Gleason and Samuel J. Dale purchased the mill. They built the existing five-story brick mill building in 1854 after the original wooden building burned on May 8, 1852. In 1898 the village was renamed Gleasondale in honor of Gleason and Dale, and the brick mill building became known as Gleasondale Mills.

On March 31, 1911, Phineas Feather—a former superintendent at Gleasondale Mills—attempted to murder mill owner Alfred Gleason with a pistol after confronting him about money he felt Gleason owed him. Another superintendent, Charles E. Roberts, disarmed Feather but was wounded in the struggle. A certain Robert J. Bevis and other individuals intervened further; Bevis and Feather were also wounded. No one died from their injuries, and after a stint at Bridgewater State Hospital Feather was released in 1915.

Until its closure in 1965, the Gleasondale Station—one of two train stations in Hudson—served the village. It was originally operated by the Central Massachusetts Railroad Company, and later by Boston & Maine. The station's name is printed as "Rocky-bottom" in an 1888 map of the Central Massachusetts Railroad.

Today Gleasondale has a few residential buildings, plus a small industrial complex in the old mill buildings. It does not have a large enough population to support a post office, and uses the same zip code as Stow, 01775. The dam remains, even though it no longer provides hydropower.
