= Rice & Hutchins =

Rice and Hutchins, Inc.
- Company type: Partnership (pre-1892); Close Corporation (after 1892)
- Industry: Shoe manufacture & wholesale
- Founded: October 1866
- Founder: William B. Rice; Horatio H. Hutchins
- Defunct: 1929
- Headquarters: Boston, Massachusetts, U.S.
- Area served: United States, England, Germany, Denmark, Philippines, Argentina
- Key people: William B. Rice, Harry L. Rice, Fred B. Rice
- Products: family shoes, boots, The Educator Shoe, The All America Shoe
- Number of employees: about 12,000 (1916)
- Subsidiaries: Joseph I. Meaney & Co, The Manhattan Shoe Company, Chesapeake, Shoe Company, Continent Shoe Company, Ohio Valley Shoe Company, St. Louis Shoe Company, Atlas Shoe Company, Vera American Shoe Company, The Rice & Hutchins Atlanta Company, The Rice & Hutchins South America Shoe Company

Rice & Hutchins, Inc. was a shoe manufacturing and wholesaling company based in Boston, Massachusetts begun as a partnership in 1866, and later incorporated in 1892. By 1916 the company was considered to be among the largest shoe manufacturers in America, with sales that were nationwide and in several countries in Europe, Asia and South America. The corporation was dissolved in 1929.

== Company history ==
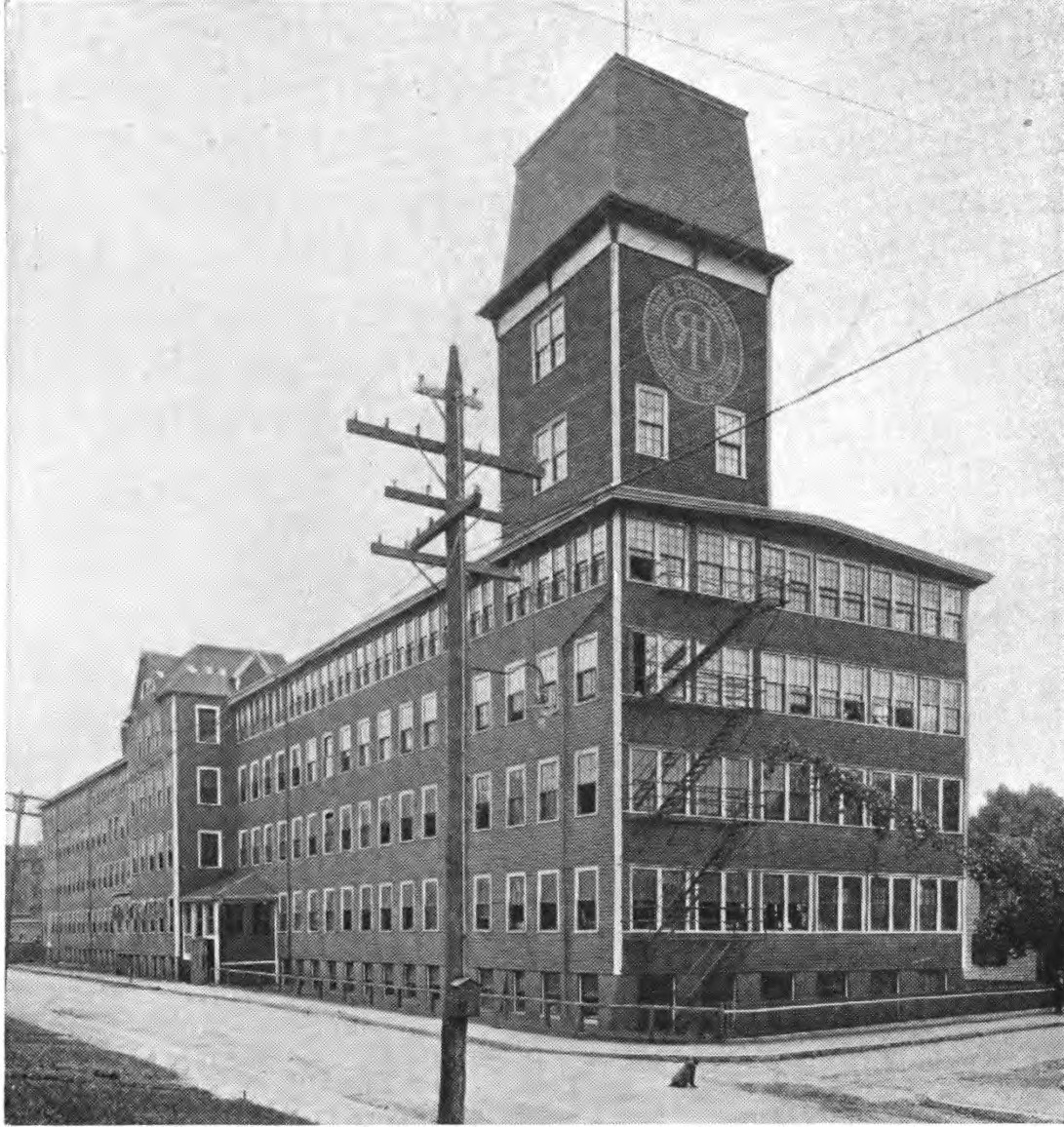
A Rice & Hutchins factory in Marlborough, Massachusetts 1902

The Rice and Hutchins Shoe Company was established in October 1866 by business partners William B. Rice as president and Horatio H. Hutchins as vice president, both of whom had experience in shoe making and sales. The company first began by selling shoes manufactured by Felton & Chipman in Marlborough, Massachusetts, and other factories around New England. The company faced an early setback from the Great Boston Fire of 1872, in which much of its stock of shoes at its offices and warehouse at 125 Summer Street in Boston were completely destroyed. Three years later, in 1875, Rice & Hutchins purchased their first factory in Marlborough, (the Felton & Chipman factory) to support their steadily increasing sales. Between 1875 and 1885, several factories were established in several New England towns and cities, including Warren, Maine; Rockland, Massachusetts; Marlborough; and Boston. In 1884, they established their first subsidiary distributing house outside of Boston, the Joseph I. Meaney & Company of Philadelphia.

In 1885, Horatio H. Hutchins retired from the company and Rice's sons Harry Lee Rice and Fred Ball Rice assumed executive positions as vice president and secretary-treasurer of the company. The years between 1885 and 1909 were a period of great growth of the company. In addition to several new and expanded factories in Massachusetts, Maine and Yonkers, New York, several subsidiary distribution houses were established in New York City, Baltimore, Chicago, Cincinnati, St. Louis, and began international sales in 1893 with a distributorship agreement with a London wholesaler. International sales were expanded in 1903 by establishing the Rice and Hutchins subsidiary of Vera American Shoe Company in Berlin and establishing a distributorship in Manila, in the Philippines.

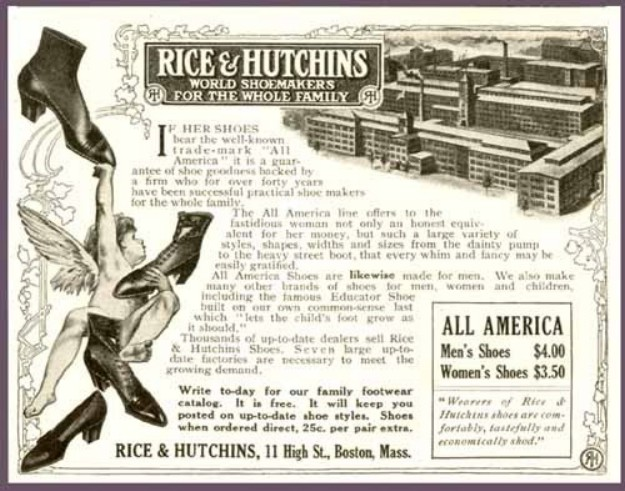
Print advertisement from Rice & Hutchins, Inc. 1907

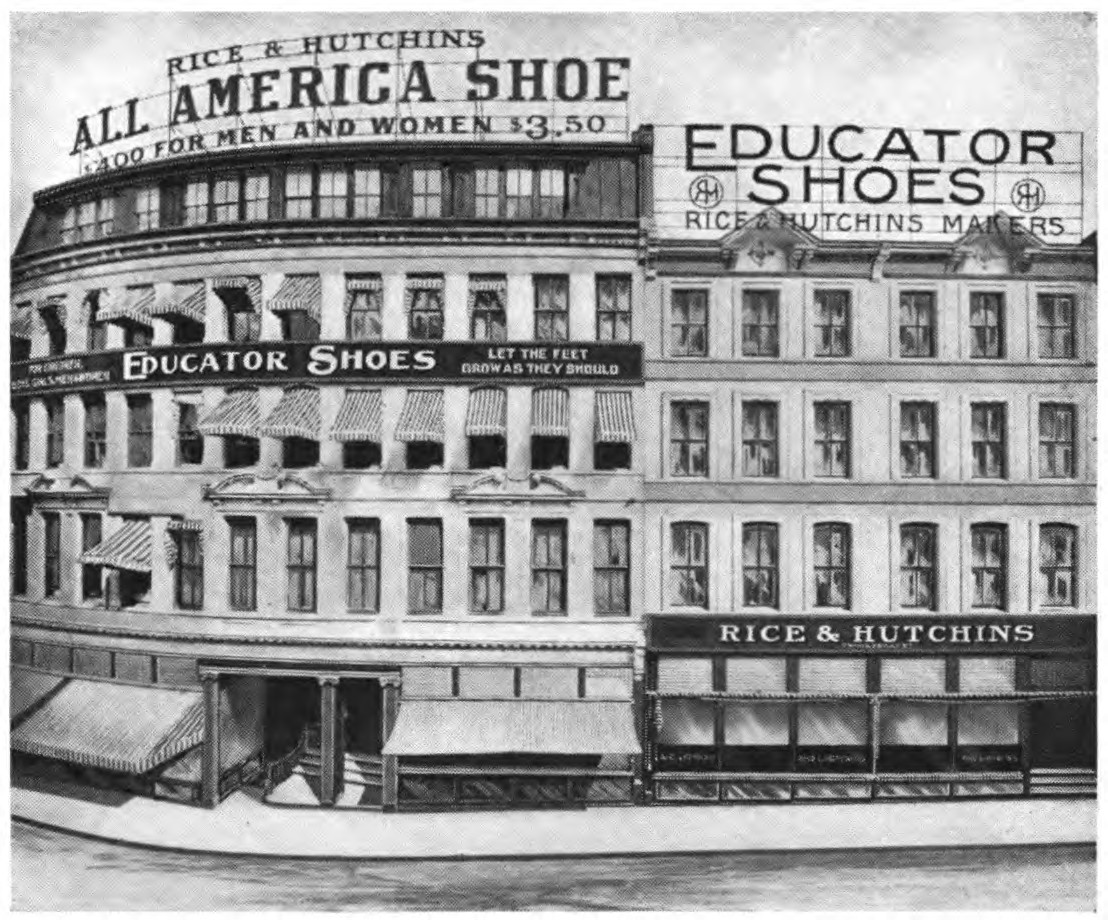
Rice & Hutchins offices at 20 High Street, Boston 1910

In 1892, the company was first reorganized as a corporation under the laws of New Jersey. Later in 1905, they reorganized again as a Maine corporation. Through all the reorganizations, William B. Rice remained as president of the company and corporations until his death in 1909, when his son Harry L. Rice assumed the presidency of the company.

Under the leadership of Harry Rice, the company further expanded international sales in 1914 by establishing subsidiary distributors in Copenhagen, Denmark and in Buenos Aires, Argentina. The company's exhibit at the Panama–Pacific International Exposition (1915 World's Fair) covering the history of shoes, including advertising and ephemera, complete with over 800 pairs of shoes and a notable display of "Educator shoes" for the "whole family", was awarded the medal of honor. By the time of the 50th anniversary of the company in October, 1916 they were among the largest manufacturers and distributors of shoes in America.

Employees of the Rice & Hutchins factory on Pearl Street in South Braintree, Massachusetts became witnesses in the murder and robbery of Frederick Parmenter, a paymaster, and Alessandro Berardelli, a security guard, coming from the adjacent Slater & Morrill factory on April 15, 1920. The murder occurred on the street directly in front of the Rice & Hutchins factory. Italian immigrants Sacco and Vanzetti were arrested for the crime and convicted based in part by the employees' testimony in the highly publicized trial.

The company continued in operation through most of the 1920s, but it was sold and the corporation was eventually dissolved by the Rice brothers (Harry & Fred) in 1929, as both were looking to retire from the business. A major dispute over the disposition of company assets and corporate succession led to the often cited Delaware Supreme Court case of Triplex Shoe Company v. Rice & Hutchins, Inc.
