= Maynard High School (Massachusetts) =

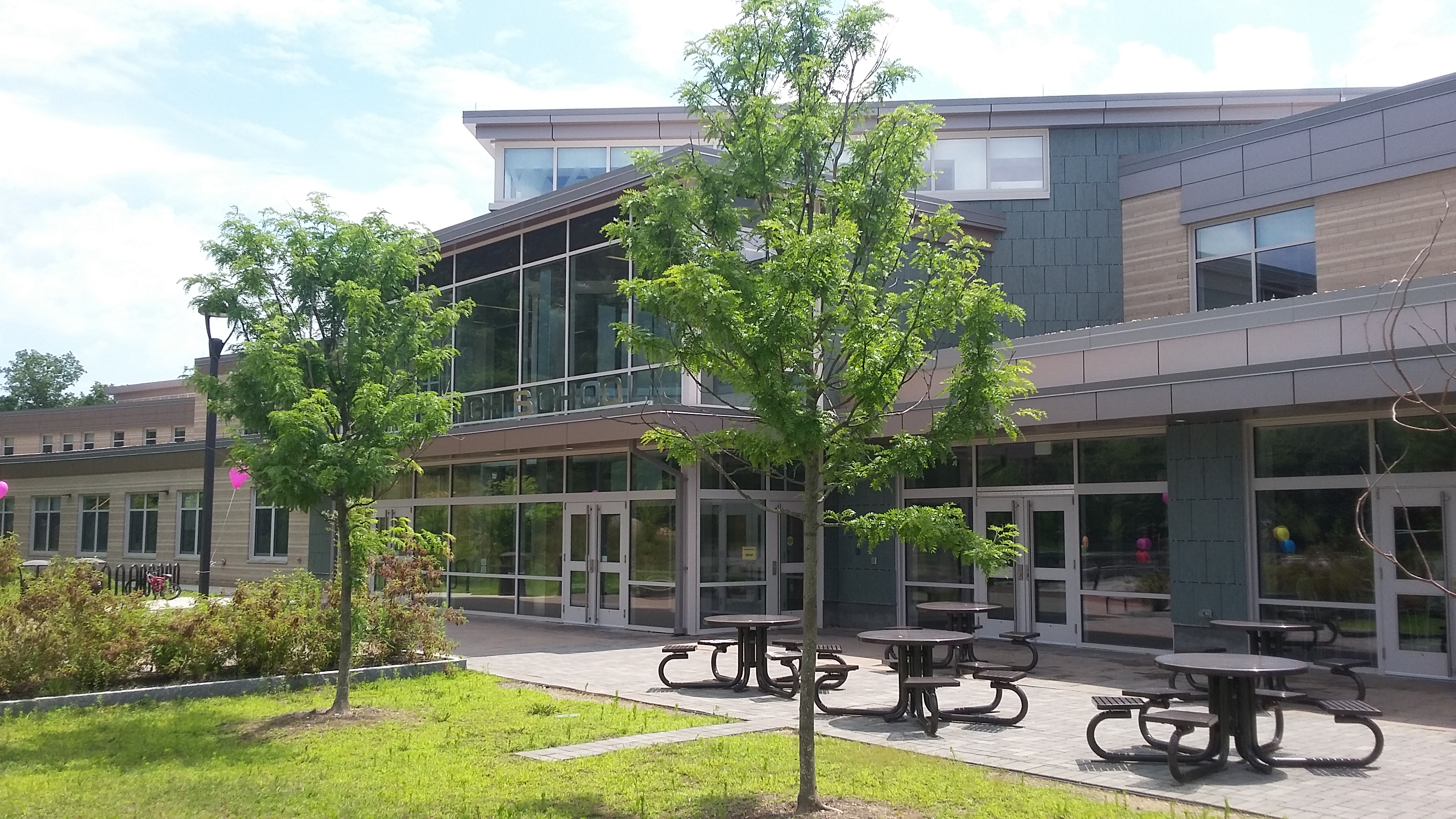
- Main Entrance

Location
- 1 Tiger Drive; Maynard, MA 01754; United States
- Coordinates: 42.4213°N 71.4529°W

Information
- School type: Public
- Established: 1871; 155 years ago
- Superintendent: Brian Hass
- Principal: Elizabeth York
- Teaching staff: 34.60 (FTE)
- Grades: 9-12
- Enrollment: 297 (2023-2024)
- Student to teacher ratio: 8.58
- Campus size: 200 acres
- Colors: Orange and black
- Athletics conference: Midland Wachusett League
- Mascot: Tiger
- Team name: Maynard High School Tigers

Maynard High School is the only public high school in Maynard, Massachusetts, United States. The 2015–16 enrollment is 485 students for grades 9 through 12. A new high school building opened for the 2013–14 school year. The high school contained the eighth grade when the new building opened. In fall of 2017, the eighth grade moved back to Fowler Middle School. The high school was one of only three schools in Massachusetts awarded Leader Status by the Collaborative for High Performance Schools for being a green building. The school has a 13:1 student teacher ratio. The school mascot is the tiger. The High School's campus is adjacent to the Green Meadow School and Fowler School. In 2022 the school was ranked as #25 best in Greater Boston and #10 for "Bang for Your Housing Buck" by Boston Magazine.

== History ==
Public education in what is now Maynard dates back to at least 1757 when the town of Stow of which Maynard was then part, voted to create public school districts throughout the town, including the Northeast Corner District. The first school house in what later became Maynard was constructed in 1766; it still exists today at 101 Summer Street as part of a private home. The first high school was built on Nason Street when Maynard became a separate town in 1871.

List of high school buildings:

- Nason Street 1871-1877 Two classrooms, 35 students; building later moved and converted to a house
- Acton Street 1877-1892 Two classrooms; sold in 1894 for rental housing, moved in 1903, torn down in 1920
- Nason Street 1892-1916 Destroyed by fire September 20, 1916. Site used for Roosevelt Elementary School 1918-1988; Maynard Public Library 2006-present
- Summer Street 1916-1964 Used as elementary school through 2000; converted to ArtSpace (artists' studios and art gallery) and Acme Theater
- Maynard High School 1964-2013 Torn down after construction of the new school
- Maynard High School 2013–present
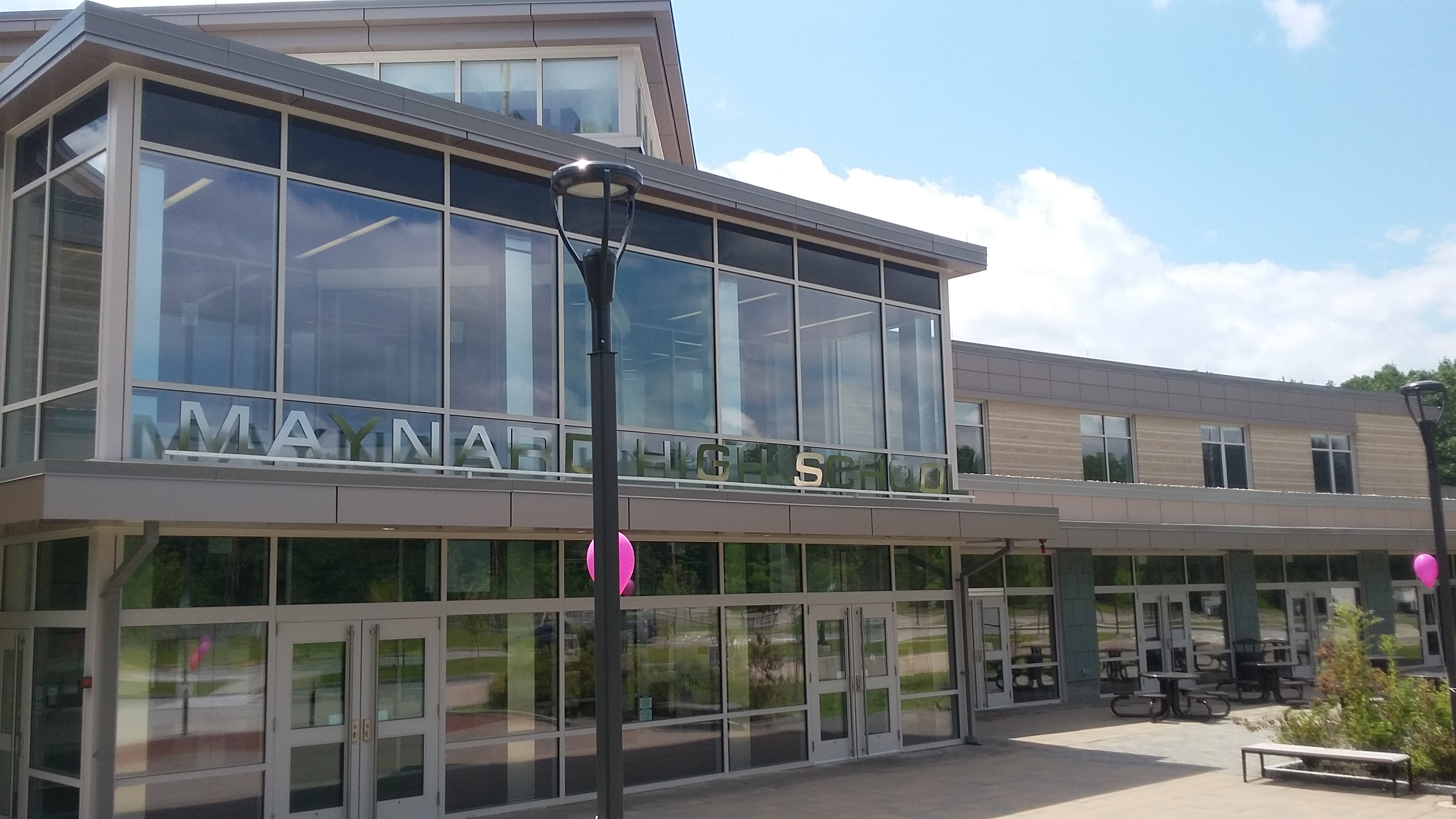
Maynard High School in 2017 (opened fall 2013)

== Athletics ==
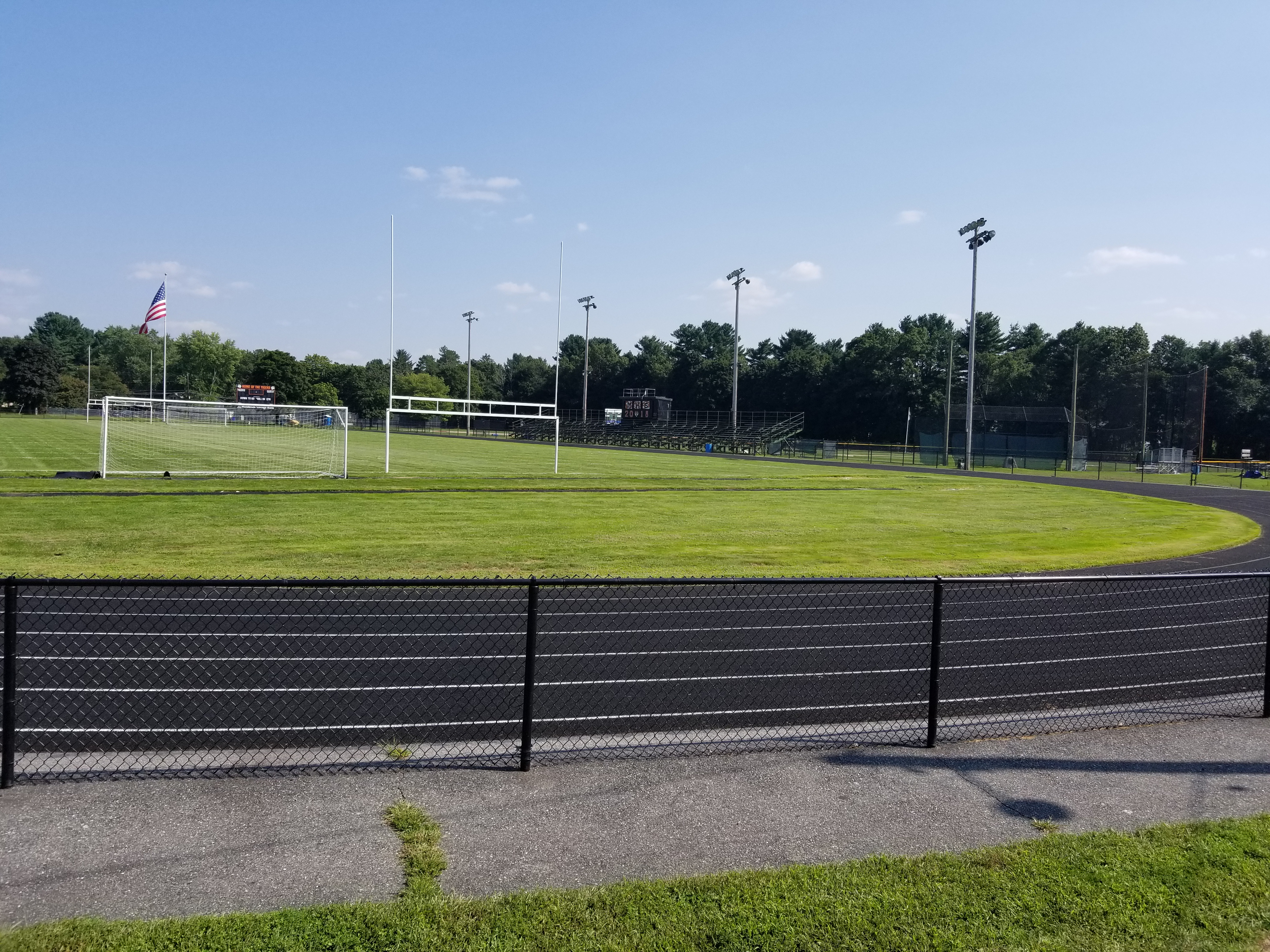
Alumni Field in Maynard Massachusetts home to the Maynard football, soccer, and track teams

The Maynard Tigers compete in the Midland-Wachusett league in football, basketball, golf, soccer, baseball, hockey, cheerleading, baseball, field hockey, wrestling, softball, lacrosse, and track. There is a Maynard High School Athletic Hall of Fame. In 2017 and 2022 the Maynard Boys' basketball team won the state championship.

== Extracurriculars and Student Organizations ==
The school offers many extracurricular activities such as Animation, Best Buddies, Culinary Club, Green Committee, International Club, WAVM, Gay-Straight Alliance (GSA), Mathletes, Mock Trial, National Honor Society, Peer Leadership, Student Government, Yearbook, Young Authors Club, and Amnesty International.

== AP Courses ==
Many Advanced Placement classes are offered, including Biology, Calculus AB, Chemistry, English Language and Composition, English Literature and Composition, Physics, Spanish Language and Culture, French Language and Culture, Studio Art, US History, Government, and World History. The high school is proud to offer as many AP courses as they do for the size of the school and the number of students it houses.

== Fine and Performing Arts ==
The school also offers classes in Art, Art History, Ceramics, Music Theory, Studio Art, Concert Band, and Theater. Maynard has put on numerous shows over its existence through its performing arts program. From shows such as Into the Woods to Beauty and the Beast to Grease, the high school keeps theater as one of its cornerstones. The high school continues to do shows every spring.
