= Assabet River National Wildlife Refuge =

Protected area and former military installation in Massachusetts, US

- IUCN category IV (habitat/species management area)
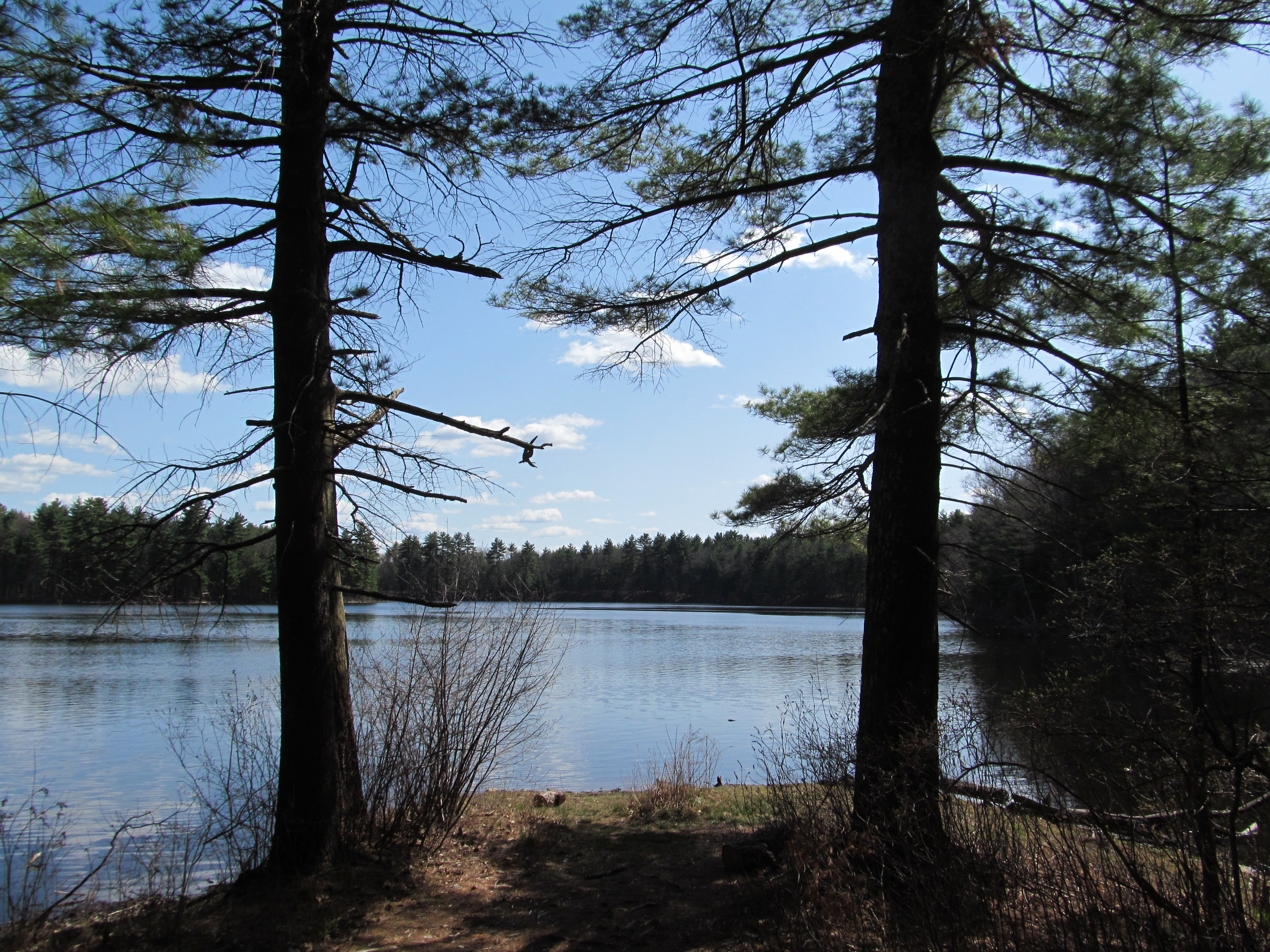
- Puffer Pond

- Location within the United States
- Location: Hudson, Maynard, Stow, Sudbury, Massachusetts, United States
- Nearest city: Maynard, Massachusetts
- Coordinates: 42°24′30″N 71°28′14″W
- Area: 2,230 acres (9.0 km^{2})
- Established: 2005
- Governing body: U.S. Fish and Wildlife Service
- Website: www.fws.gov/refuge/assabet_river/

The Assabet River National Wildlife Refuge (ARNWR; formerly referred to as the U.S. Army's Fort Devens-Sudbury Training Annex) is a 2,230-acre (9.0 km^{2}) protected National Wildlife Refuge located approximately 25 miles (40 km) west of Boston and 4 miles (6.4 km) west of the Eastern Massachusetts National Wildlife Refuge Complex Headquarters, along the Assabet River. It is located in portions of the towns of Hudson, Maynard, Stow and Sudbury. The Assabet River National Wildlife Refuge consists of two separate pieces of land. The larger northern section is just north of Hudson Road, extending north to the Assabet River. The southern section is located to the south of Hudson Road. There is a visitor center located in the northern section on Winterberry Way.

== Wildlife and habitat ==
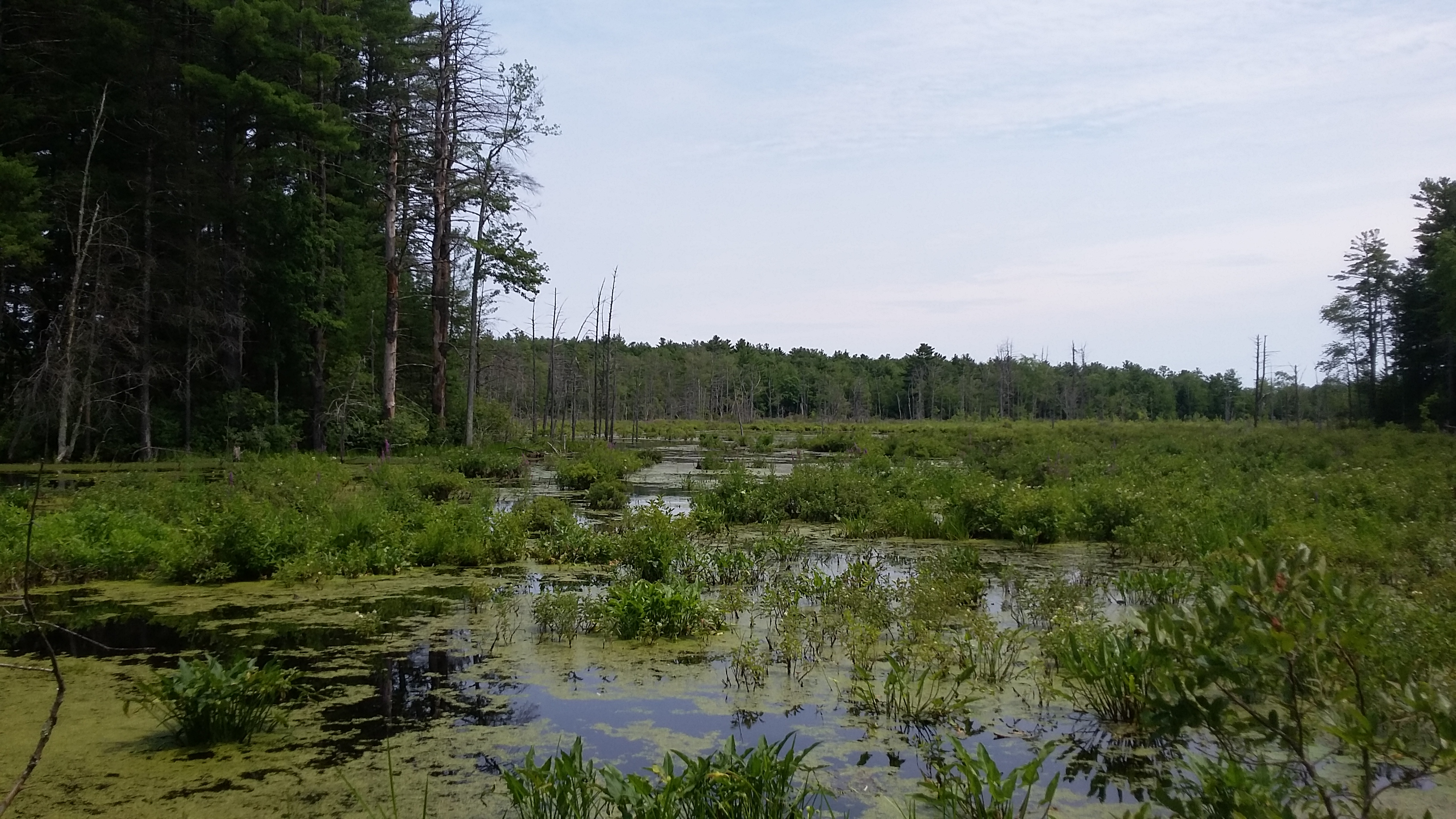
Marsh in ARNWR

The refuge contains a diverse mixture of pine and hardwood forest, old fields, and wetland habitats, including vernal pools. The refuge is an "important feeding and breeding areas for migratory birds and other wildlife". The rare Blanding's turtle species is found in the refuge where it is monitored as scientists are working to help increase the population in the region. The refuge "is 70% forested and there are 476 acres designated as wetlands" with a "habitat for a large number of bird species as well as migratory birds and waterfowl" and otters, minks, turkeys, coyotes, beavers, foxes, and deer.

== Visiting ==
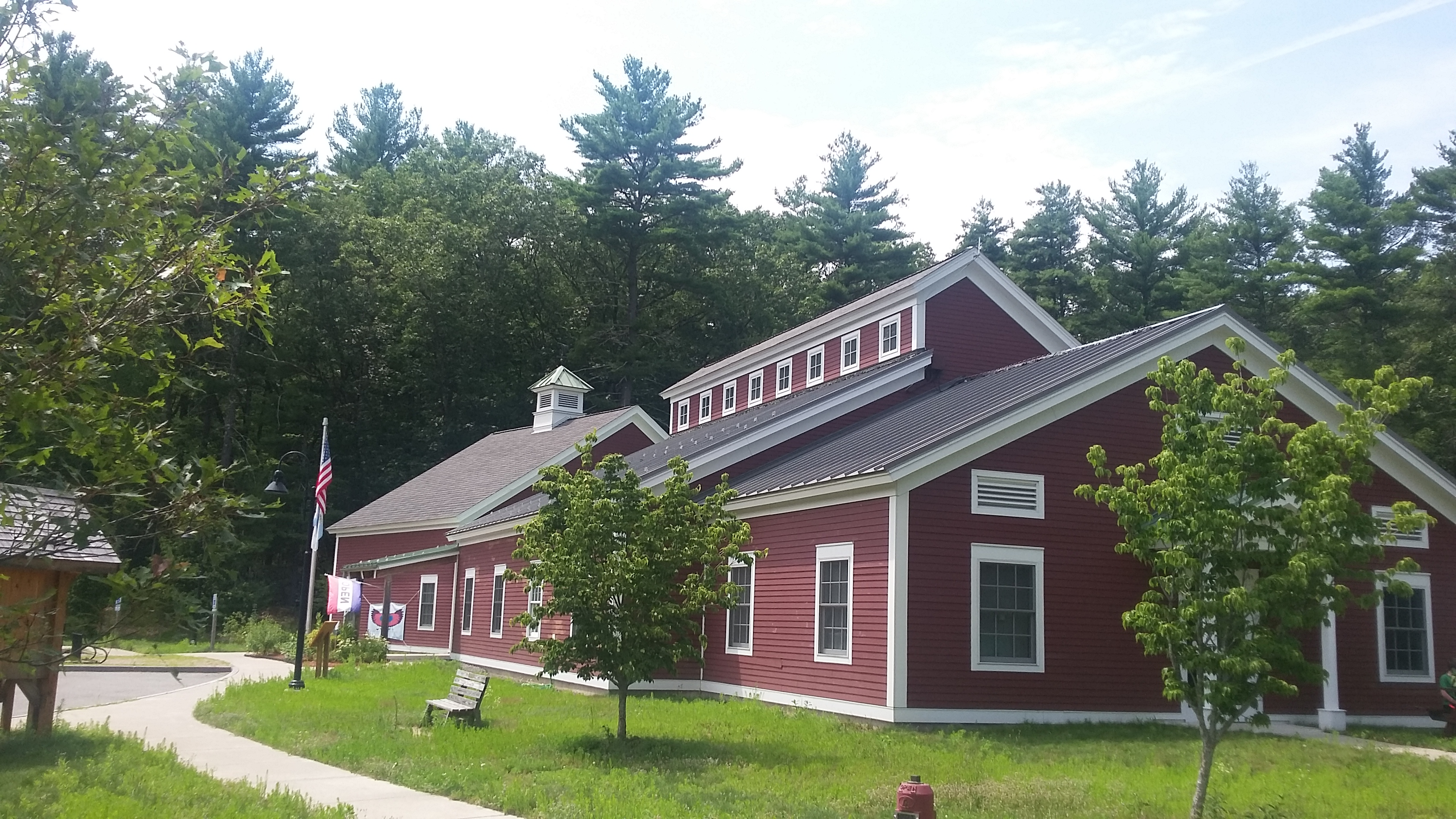
Visitor Center at Assabet River National Wildlife Refuge in Sudbury

On March 26, 2005, the refuge officially opened for wildlife-dependent recreation. A map of existing trails is available at the visitor center and at the refuge website. As of September 24, 2014, there are 15 miles (24 km) of trails open to the public for wildlife observation, half of which are open to biking. The Assabet River Rail Trail has a section with a north end at the South Acton (MBTA station) and a south end at the north entrance to ARNWR (from White Pond Road, Stow).

The refuge is open for hunting and fishing, with hunting seasons set for deer, turkeys, grouse, woodcock, rabbits and squirrels.

Dogs are not allowed, nor are other pets, horses, fires, overnight camping, ATVs, or snowmobiles.

== Friends of the Assabet River National Wildlife Refuge ==
The Friends of the Assabet River National Wildlife Refuge (FARNWR) is a non-profit organization formed in 2000, nearly a full year prior to the transfer of the annex to the U.S. Fish and Wildlife Service. Since that time, the Friends Group has provided the refuge invaluable assistance in preparing to open the refuge for wildlife-dependent recreational activities by removing physical safety hazards; conducting biological surveys of vernal pools, raptors, bats, invasive plant species; and conducting numerous public outreach and education programs.

== History ==
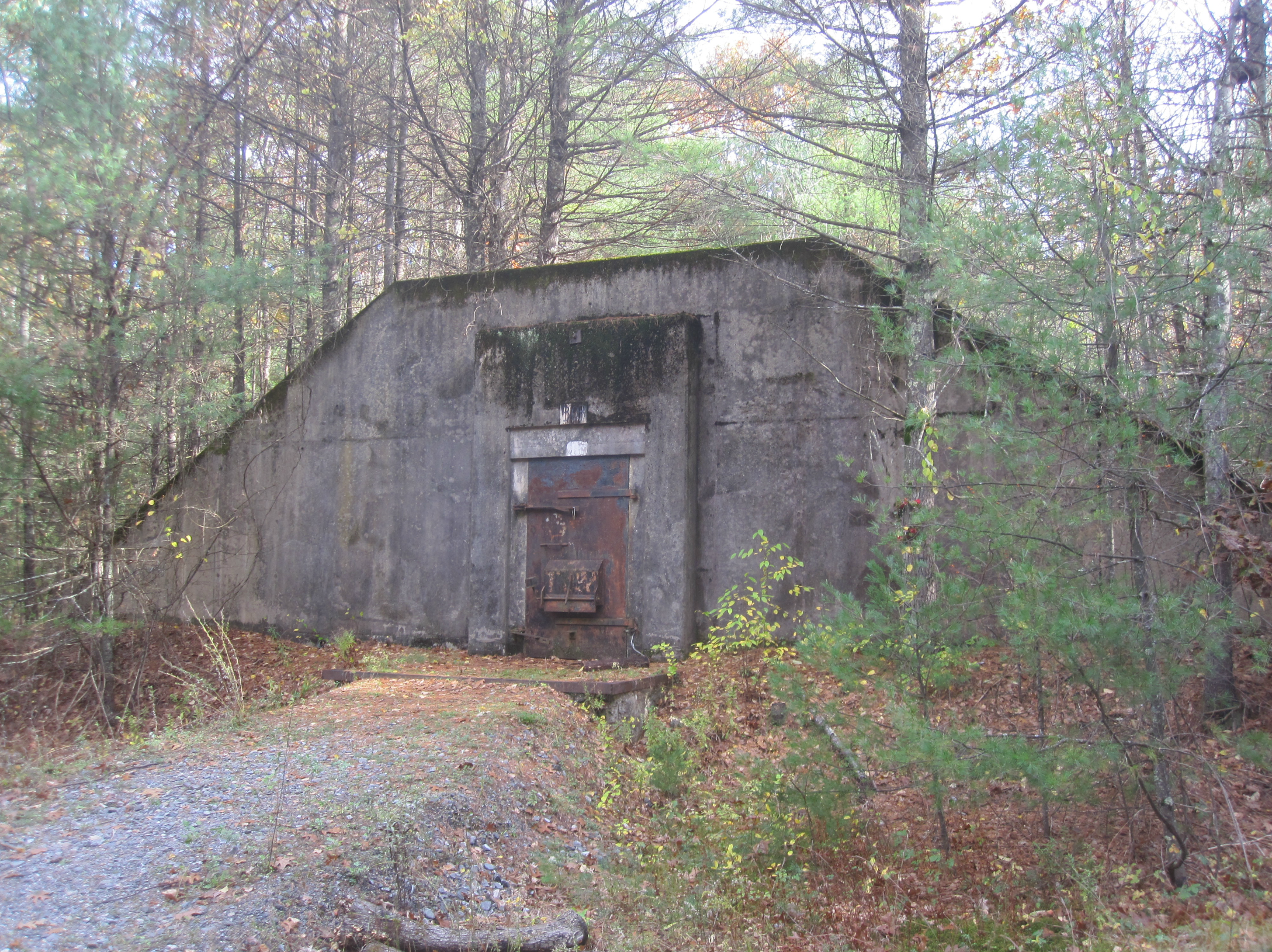
One of the former World War II bunkers on refuge land

The land on which the wildlife refuge sits was originally occupied by Native Americans and then became farmland for early colonists in the seventeenth and eighteenth centuries. During the Revolutionary War, ammunition wagons traveled along Old Marlborough Road (part of which is now a path in the refuge) from Concord to Marlborough to provide George Washington arms for his defense of Trenton. In 1851 transcendentalist Henry David Thoreau, who lived in Concord, wrote about his walk along the Assabet River in what is now the refuge in Maynard in his famous journal, and he wrote a poem entitled "Old Marlborough Road" about the road which ran from Concord to Marlborough, parts of which are in the ARNWR and now known as Winterberry Way and Powerline Trail.

Origins of the refuge date back to the 1942 World War II-era seizure of land spanning Maynard, Sudbury, Hudson, and Stow by federal eminent domain as the Fort Devens-Sudbury Training Annex. Landowners were given about ten days to pack up and leave, and by their own accounts received around ten cents on the dollar of what the land was actually worth.

One of the most interesting features of the refuge is the World War II-era ammunition bunkers. The site was chosen as it had convenient railroad shipping to the Boston Navy Yard, yet was far enough inland that a German battleship could not shell the area. Each of the 50 bunkers, officially referred to as "igloos", has inside dimensions of 81 feet (25 m) by 26 feet (7.9 m) by 12 feet (3.7 m), and a curved roof. Sides and roofs were mounded with dirt for extra protection and camouflage from aerial view. Bunker #303 is sometimes open for tours.

After World War II the site served as a troop training ground, ordnance testing, and laboratory disposal area for Natick Labs, otherwise known as the United States Army Soldier Systems Center. A 1980s assessment led to the area's categorization as an EPA Superfund clean-up site in 1990, as it was contaminated with arsenic, pesticides, and other chemicals, which were removed. Extensive Army clean-up efforts continued for years, ending with the site being turned over to the U.S. Fish & Wildlife Service in 2000.

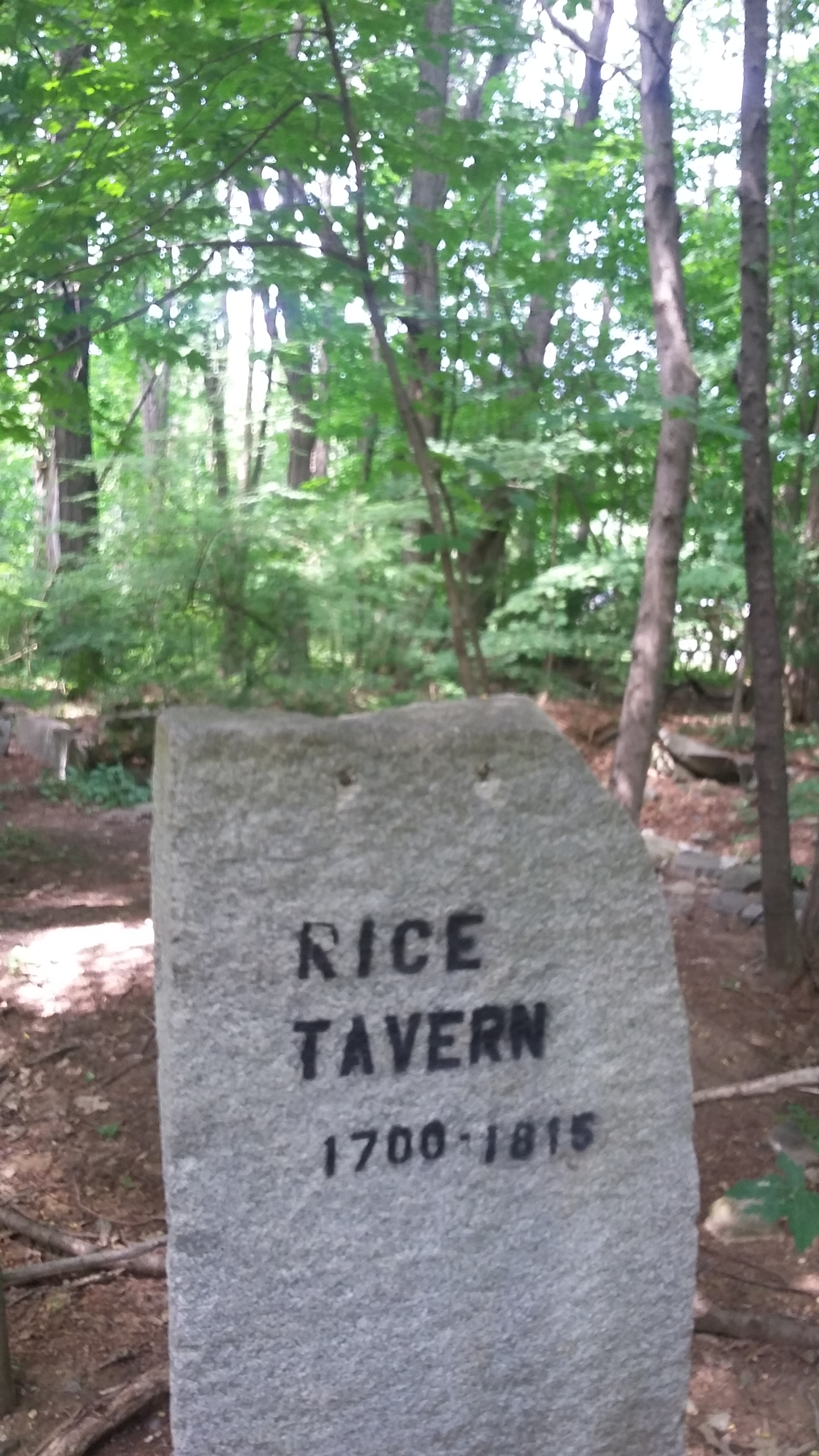
Site of Rice Tavern, a former colonial tavern with the foundation in back of the sign, near the entrance at Old Marlboro Road in Maynard

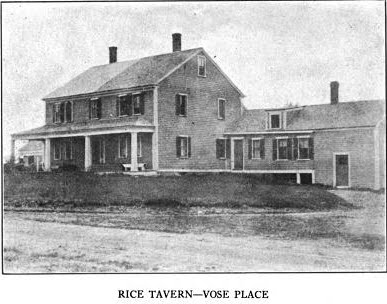
Rice Tavern before it was torn down

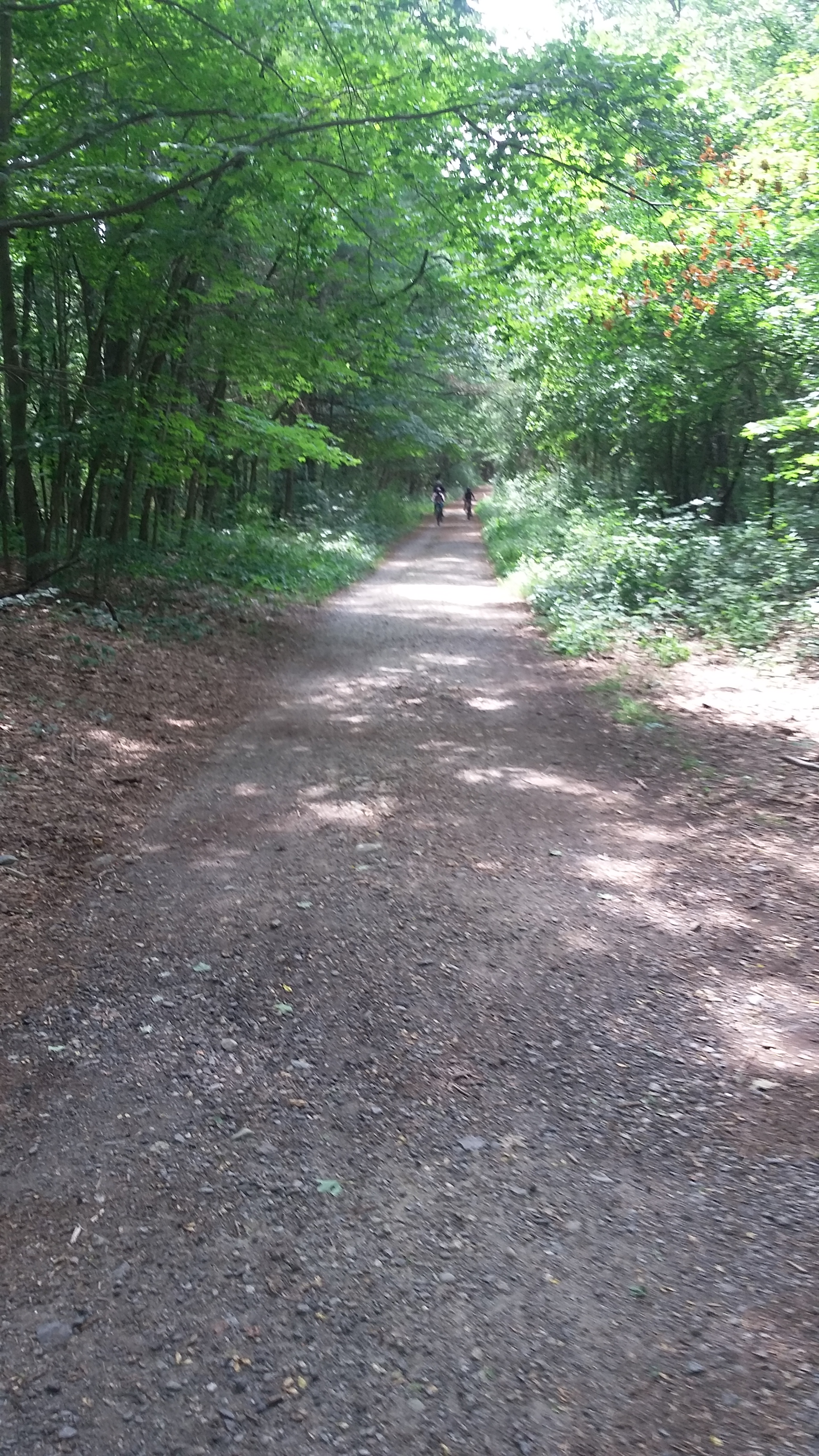
Path near the Old Marlboro Road entrance in Maynard
