= Luke Brooks (American soldier) =

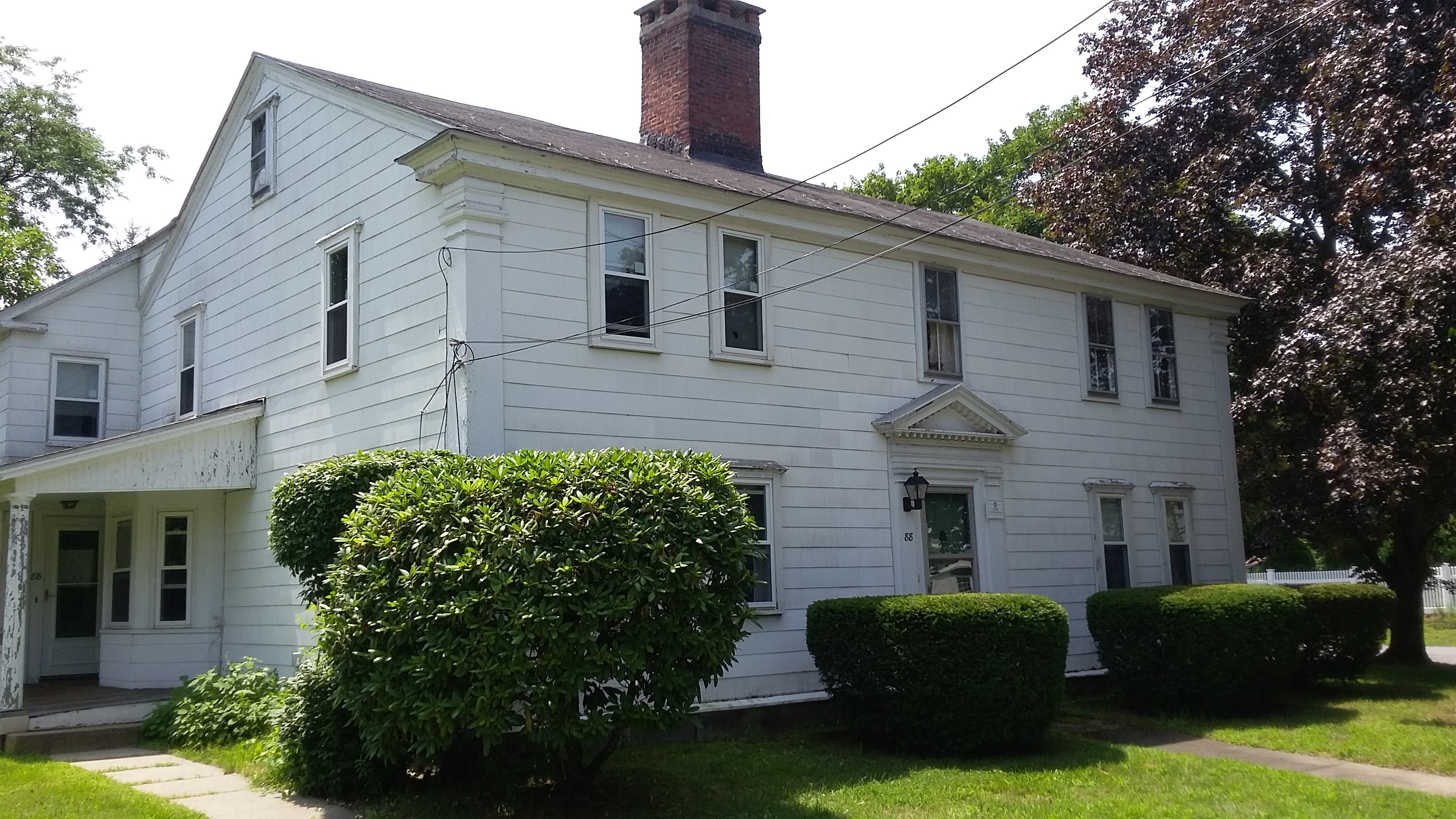
Luke Brooks house on Summer Street in Maynard, Massachusetts, known as the Silas Brooks House (after his grandson)

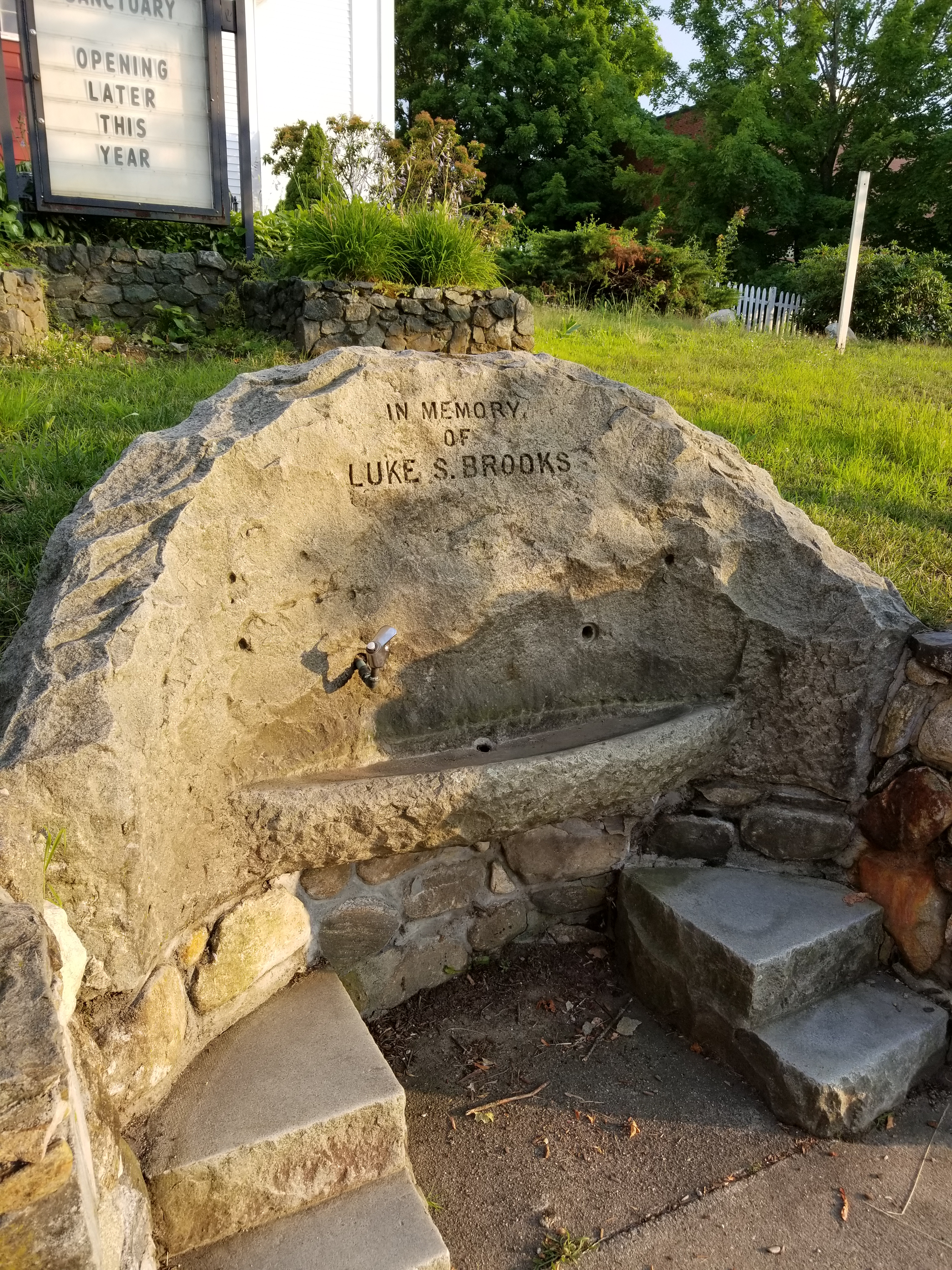
Luke S. Brooks memorial fountain on Main Street in Maynard, Massachusetts, donated in his memory by family descendants in 1911.

Luke Brooks (1731–1817) was an American soldier who served at the Battles of Lexington and Concord, the first battles of the American Revolutionary War. He was born in Concord, Massachusetts, on August 10, 1731, to Thomas Brooks and Hannah Brooks. Luke married Lucy Wheeler in Concord in 1755. On April 19, 1775, Brooks served at the Lexington Alarm when the militia was called to Concord, and he served as a participant in the first battles of the American Revolutionary War in the Stow militia as a private in the Assabet Company of Minutemen, who were from Assabet village, which became Maynard, Massachusetts, in 1871. He took part in delivering new troops for three year terms of service. In 1789 Brooks served on the local school committee for the district school located nearby on Summer Street. Luke Brooks died on January 17, 1817, and was survived by his son, Stephen Brooks (1756–1836), who was also a veteran of Lexington and Concord. Brooks' house (built 1764) survives as one of the oldest extant houses in Maynard.
