= Maynard Public Library =

Public library in Maynard, Massachusetts

Coordinates: 42.4343°N 71.4521°W

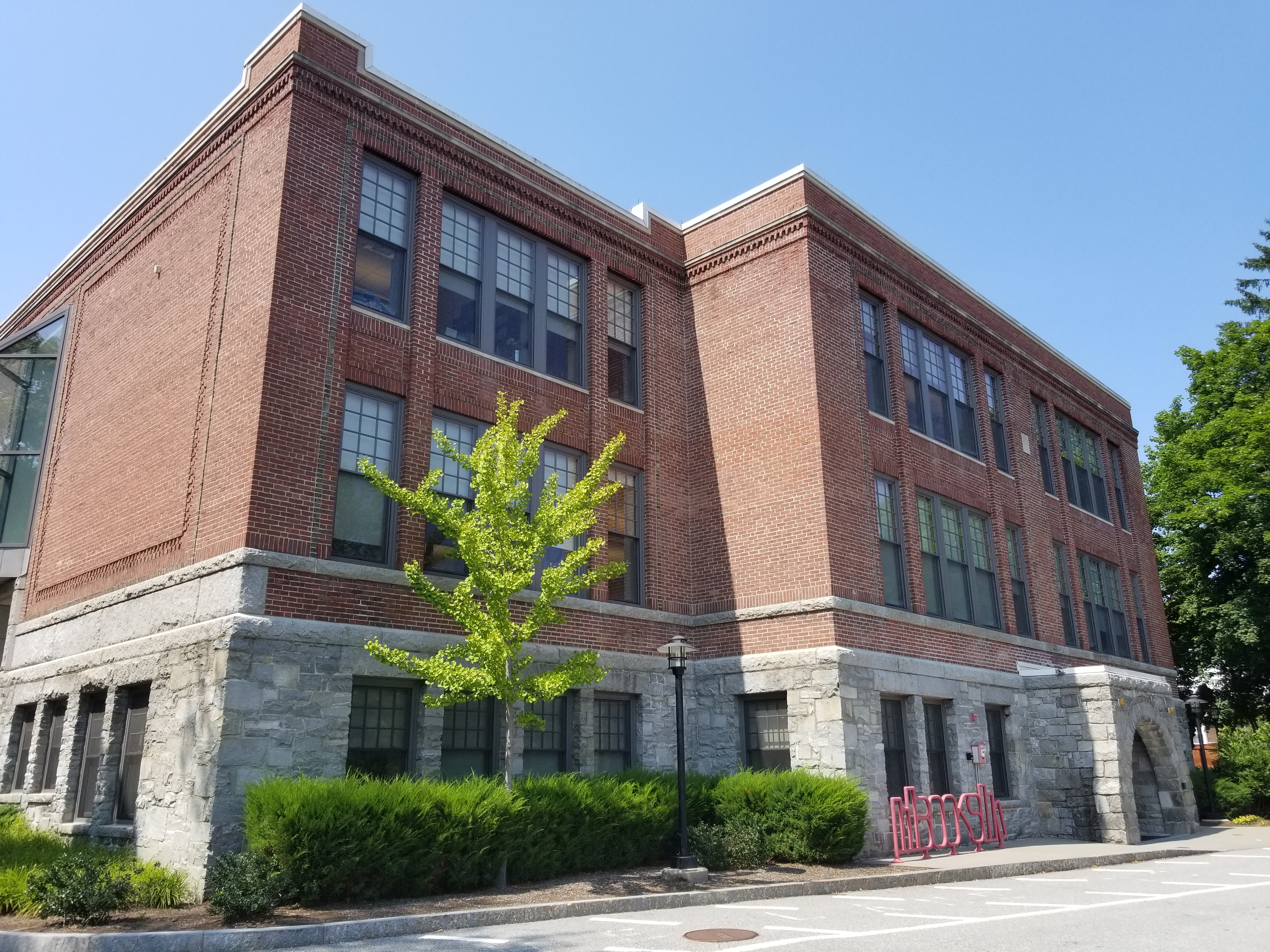
- Maynard Public Library moved in 2006 to building that had been Roosevelt School 1918-1988
- Location: Maynard, Massachusetts, United States of America
- Type: Public Library
- Established: 1881
- Branches: 1

Collection
- Size: 59,153

Access and use
- Circulation: 172,123
- Population served: 10,106 (2010 census)

Other information
- Budget: $521,000
- Director: Jean Maguire
- Website: www.maynardpubliclibrary.org

Maynard Public Library is a public library at 77 Nason Street in Maynard, Massachusetts. The library is part of the Minuteman Library Network. The Maynard Public Library was founded in 1881. The library building at 77 Nason Street – formerly Roosevelt Elementary School (built in 1918) – was renovated and reopened as a library in 2006.

== History ==
The original library location, opening day April 4, 1881, was inside the Acton Street School. Mary Reed was the first librarian. From 1885 to 1918 the library was a room inside the Riverside Cooperative Building, at the southwest corner of Nason and Summer Streets. From there, it moved on July 13, 1918 to a second floor space in the Naylor Block building, at the corner of Nason and Main Streets. Town of Maynard Annual Reports mention that in 1891 the collection had consisted of 3,416 books, and had reached 15,000 books by 1960. In 1960 there was a proposal for the Town of Maynard to build a town hall and adjoining library. The dedication ceremony for the library was July 29, 1962. Originally only on one floor, it occupied both floors of the building by 1974, totaling 6,000 square feet, with a collection size of approximately 30,000 items.

The library became a full member of the Minuteman Library Network in the summer of 1995. In 1999, under the direction of Library Trustees William Cullen, Elizabeth Binstock, and AnneMarie Lesniak-Betley and Director Stephen Weiner, a movement to build a new library facility began. In 2002 a grant of 2 million dollars was awarded to the Town by the state of Massachusetts, while the Friends of the Maynard Public Library secured 600,000 dollars in donations. The abandoned Roosevelt school on Nason Street was chosen as the new library site. The plan was to retain the entrances and brick walls of the school building, but construct an entirely new structure within the exterior shell. Construction began in September 2004 and was completed in May 2006. Total cost came to 5.7 million dollars. The new Maynard Public Library, three stories, 24,000 square feet, opened its doors on July 16, 2006.

== Services and resources ==
The Library offers programs for children and adults, provides access to electronic resource collections, and has meeting rooms available for town organizations. Friends of the Maynard Public Library is a volunteer, non-profit organization that supports the library, its collections, and its services.
