= South Acton station (MBTA) =

Railroad station in Acton, Massachusetts

South Acton
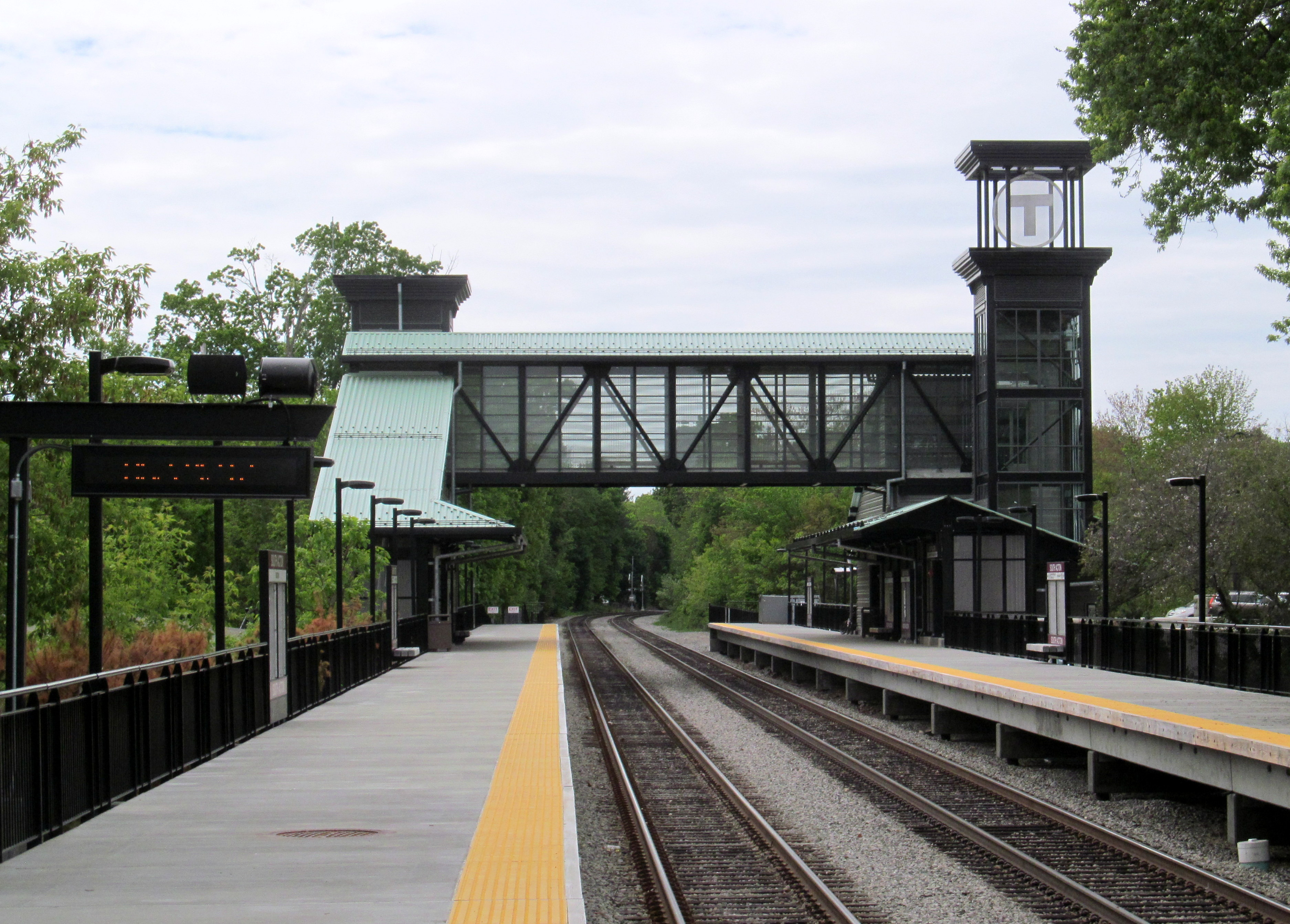
- South Acton station in May 2017

General information
- Location: 10 Central Street; Acton, Massachusetts
- Coordinates: 42.461428°N 71.456881°W
- Owner: MBTA (station); Town of Acton (parking lot)
- Line: Fitchburg Line
- Platforms: 2 side platforms
- Tracks: 2
- Connections: Boxborough Connects, Cross Acton Transit; MWRTA: 495 Connector

Construction
- Parking: 287 spaces
- Cycle facilities: 100 spaces
- Accessible: yes

Other information
- Fare zone: 6

History
- Opened: October 1, 1844
- Rebuilt: 1980s; 2012–2015

Passengers
- 2024: 463 daily boardings

Services
Preceding station	MBTA	Following station
Littleton/Route 495 toward Wachusett	Fitchburg Line	West Concord toward North Station
Location

South Acton station is an MBTA Commuter Rail station in Acton, Massachusetts. It serves the Fitchburg Line. It is located off Route 27 near Route 2 in the South Acton area. It serves as a park and ride station for Acton and other suburbs of Boston, with a 287-space parking lot owned by the town.

There has been a station on the Fitchburg mainline at the South Acton site since 1844; until 1958 it also served a branch line to Maynard which in earlier years had extended through Hudson to Marlborough. This unused right-of-way became the Assabet River Rail Trail. South Acton has had continuous Boston commuter service since its inception except for five months in 1965 during the transition from fully private railroad operations to state subsidy.

As part of a $277 million project upgrading the Fitchburg Line, South Acton station was completely rebuilt with two accessible high-level platforms connected with an overhead pedestrian bridge, as well as a drop-off lane off Maple Street. The work began in 2012 and the new station opened on December 19, 2015.

== History ==
=== B&M era ===
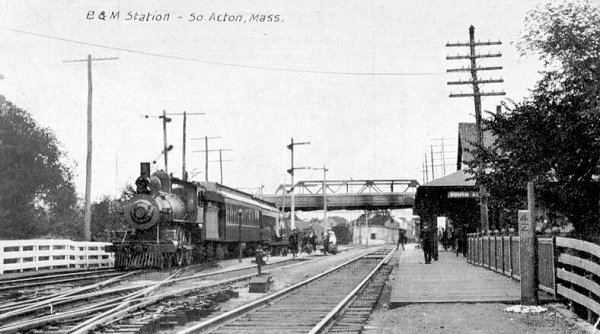
A Marlborough Branch train at South Acton in 1911

The Fitchburg Railroad began serving the town with a stop, located off of School Street east of Main Street, when it reached the town on October 1, 1844. The railroad completed the first station in 1845 and, when the new station was built in 1892, the old station was moved to Jones Farm and used as a fire station until 1927. The station was reduced to a single agent in 1932. The building was used as a plumbing and electrical supply store by 1962, though tickets were still sold at the store. The Boston and Maine Railroad sold the building in the early 1970s; it burned in 1984 and was torn down.

South Acton served as a station stop for both the Fitchburg Branch and Marlborough Branch of the B&M. The Marlborough Branch split off from the Fitchburg Railroad west of the station. The station also maintained a two-stall round house, a freight house, and a turntable, located off the Marlborough Branch. Marlborough Branch passenger service ended in 1939, though freight service continued on the line until around 1970. The stub of the branch at South Acton was used as a siding to turn RDC trains until its abandonment in 1979. The right-of-way has since been reused for the Assabet River Rail Trail on its Hudson and Marlborough section. In 2018 rail trail construction will be completed on a 3.4 mile section starting at train station and extending southeast through Maynard to the Maynard/Stow border.

=== MBTA era ===
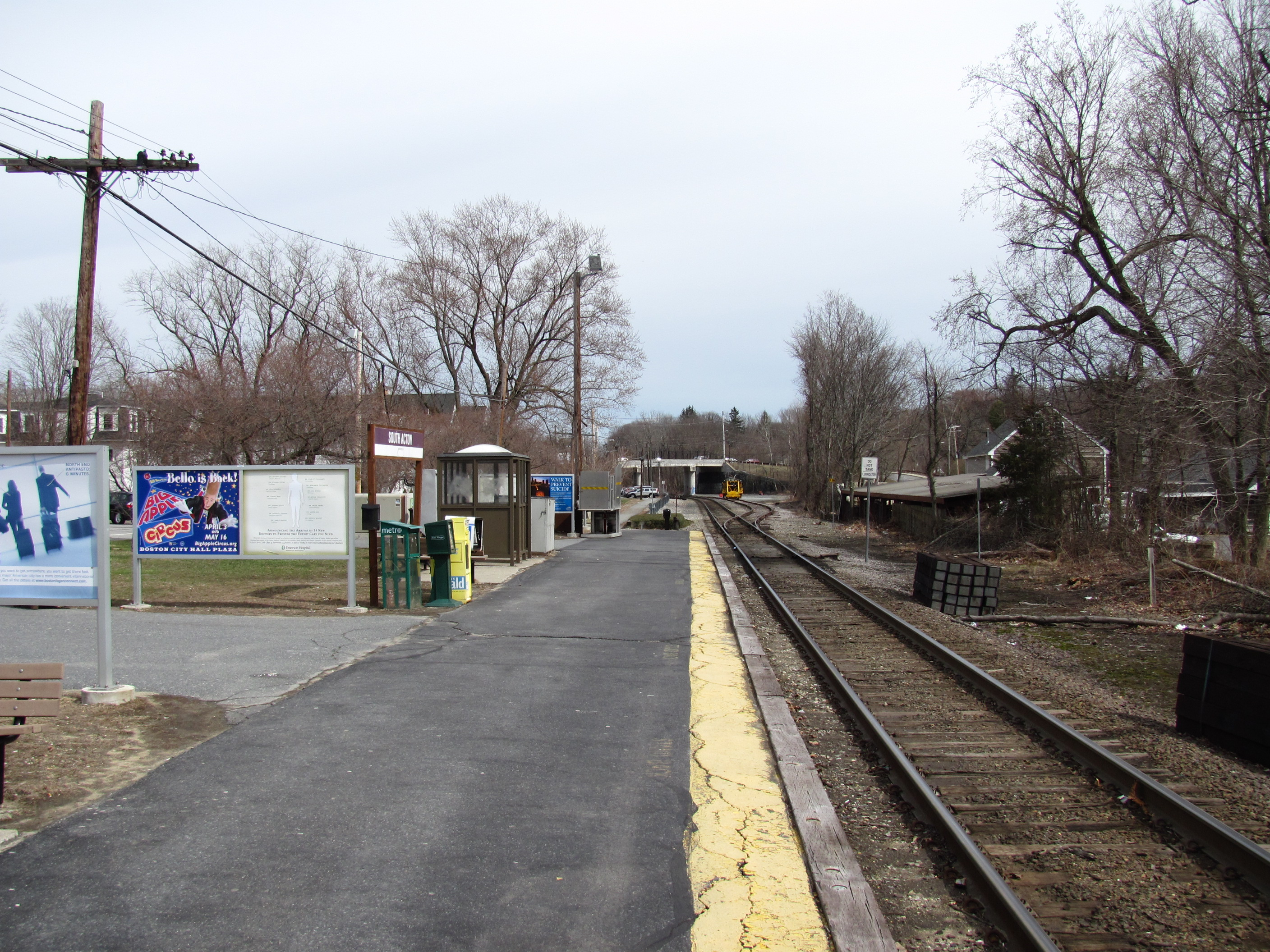
The 1970s-built platform in 2010 before reconstruction

The Massachusetts Bay Transportation Authority was formed in August 1964 to subsidize suburban commuter rail service. On January 17, 1965, northside services were cut to the boundaries of the MBTA funding district. The Fitchburg Line was cut to West Concord until June 28, 1965 when it was reopened to Ayer. After service to Ayer was discontinued on March 1, 1975, South Acton was the end of the line until service was restored as far as Gardner on January 13, 1980. During that time, the line was known as the South Acton Line.

Around 1977, the Town of Acton and the MBTA built a new platform two tenths of a mile westward, off of Central Street west of Main Street, to provide expanded on-site parking. The original parking lot is now the "overflow" parking lot; portions of the former platform remain in the brush off the north side of the tracks. The former station building was demolished between 1985 and 1995.

=== Fitchburg Line upgrades ===
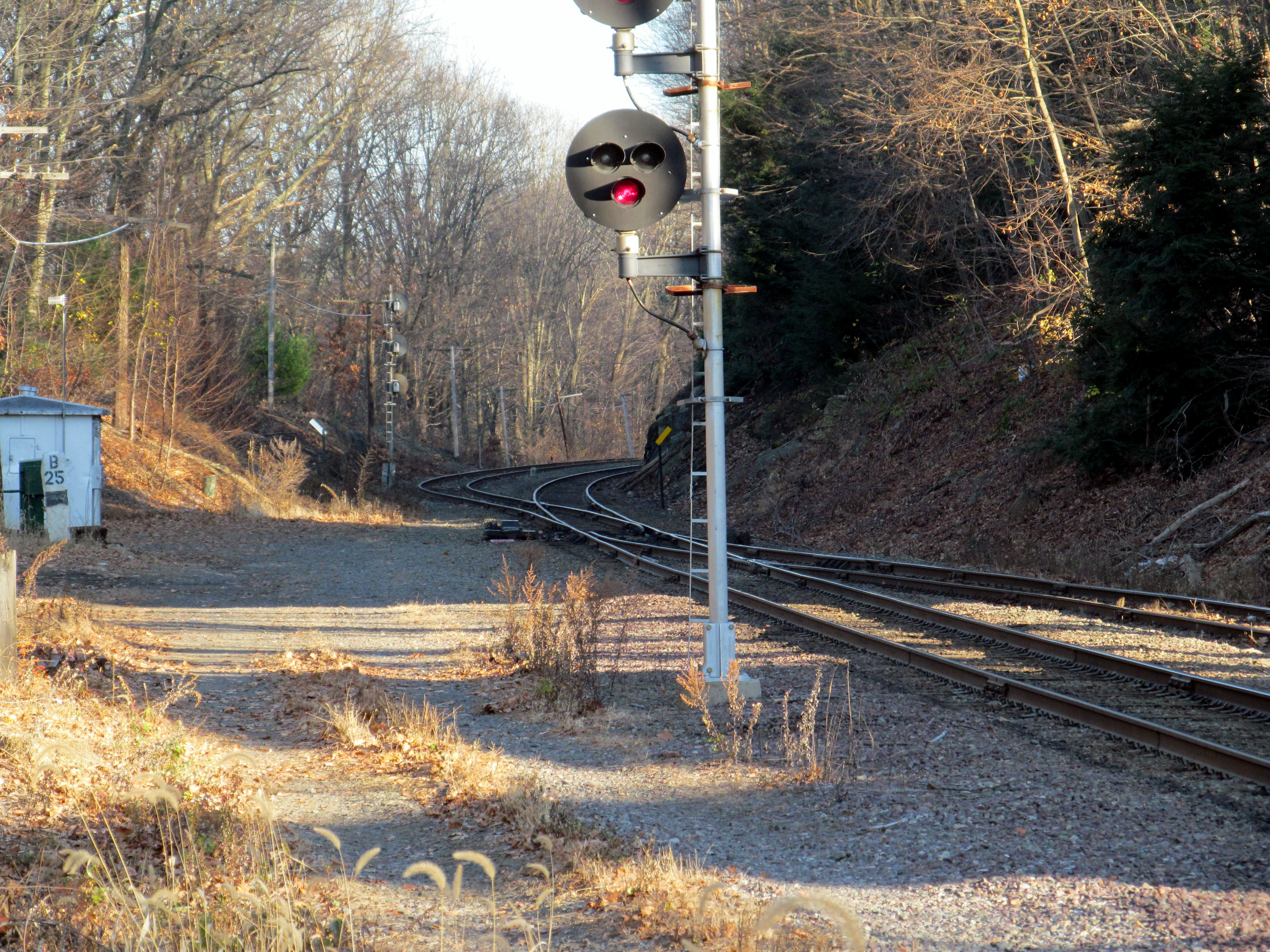
Before the upgrade project, this switch just east of the station was the outer end of double track on the line until Ayer. (The branch on the right led to a siding for trains which terminated at South Acton).

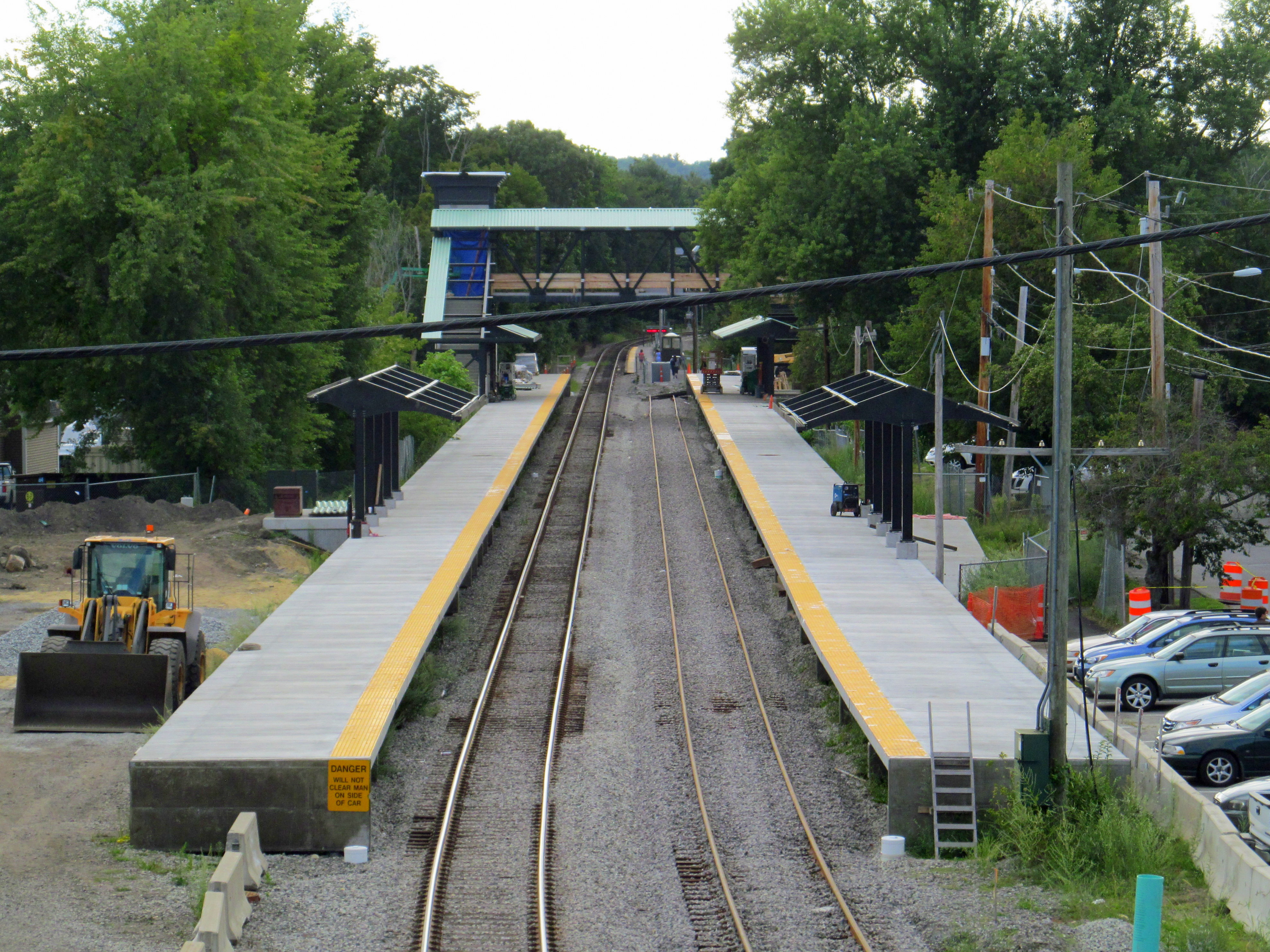
Platforms fully constructed in August 2015, with pedestrian bridge work and track work continuing

Until 2011, the main double-track section of the Fitchburg Line ended a quarter mile east of the station, with a short second under the Main Street bridge to allow a trainset to sit while preparing for an inbound run. The 1980s-constructed station had a single low platform, which was not handicapped accessible, serving the single track. As part of the ongoing upgrades to the Fitchburg Line infrastructure, South Action station was rebuilt and opened 2015, as the second track was added to the Acton-Ayer section of the line. The new station has separate platforms for inbound and outbound service; both platforms are full-length high-level for accessible boarding. They are connected by a pedestrian bridge which includes ADA-required elevators.

A single-platform design was considered in 2009, but the imposing design and the need for large ramps were disliked by town residents. The two-platform design, accepted in 2010, eliminated the need for large ramps and allowed for Maple Street access. The new design was largely based on community input.

A small drop-off lane was built on the south side of the tracks off Maple Street, next to the new inbound platform. However, daily parking capacity was not immediately increased. Additional service and parking at Littleton/Route 495, additional parking at Ayer, and the opening of Wachusett should help to mitigate the demand for parking at South Acton.

On June 11, 2012, the MBTA opened bids for the $9.622 million construction project. Construction preparation began in September 2012. During the periods where the 1980s-built station platform was closed, temporary platforms east of the station (at the former station site) and west of the station were used to board passengers. These platforms were installed in October and November 2012; ceremonial groundbreaking was held in December.

The station site was prepared during the winter of 2012-2013, and work on the high-level inbound platform began in April 2013. Foundations for the inbound platform and the pedestrian bridge were laid in 2013. The subcontractor for the steel bridge structure was replaced due to compliance issues in 2013, delaying plans to have the project open by early 2015. The inbound platform was constructed in mid-2014, followed by the outbound platform in November 2014.

Until 2014, South Acton was the only station other than Porter and North Station served by all Fitchburg Line trains, for a total of about 16 daily round trips. About one-third of these trips terminated at South Acton, while the others continued to Fitchburg. All short turn trains were extended to Littleton/Route 495 station on August 4, 2014.

The new station was largely complete by the end of November 2015 and opened on December 19, 2015. On January 30, 2016, the MBTA held an opening ceremony with local and state officials.

== Service ==
=== Parking ===
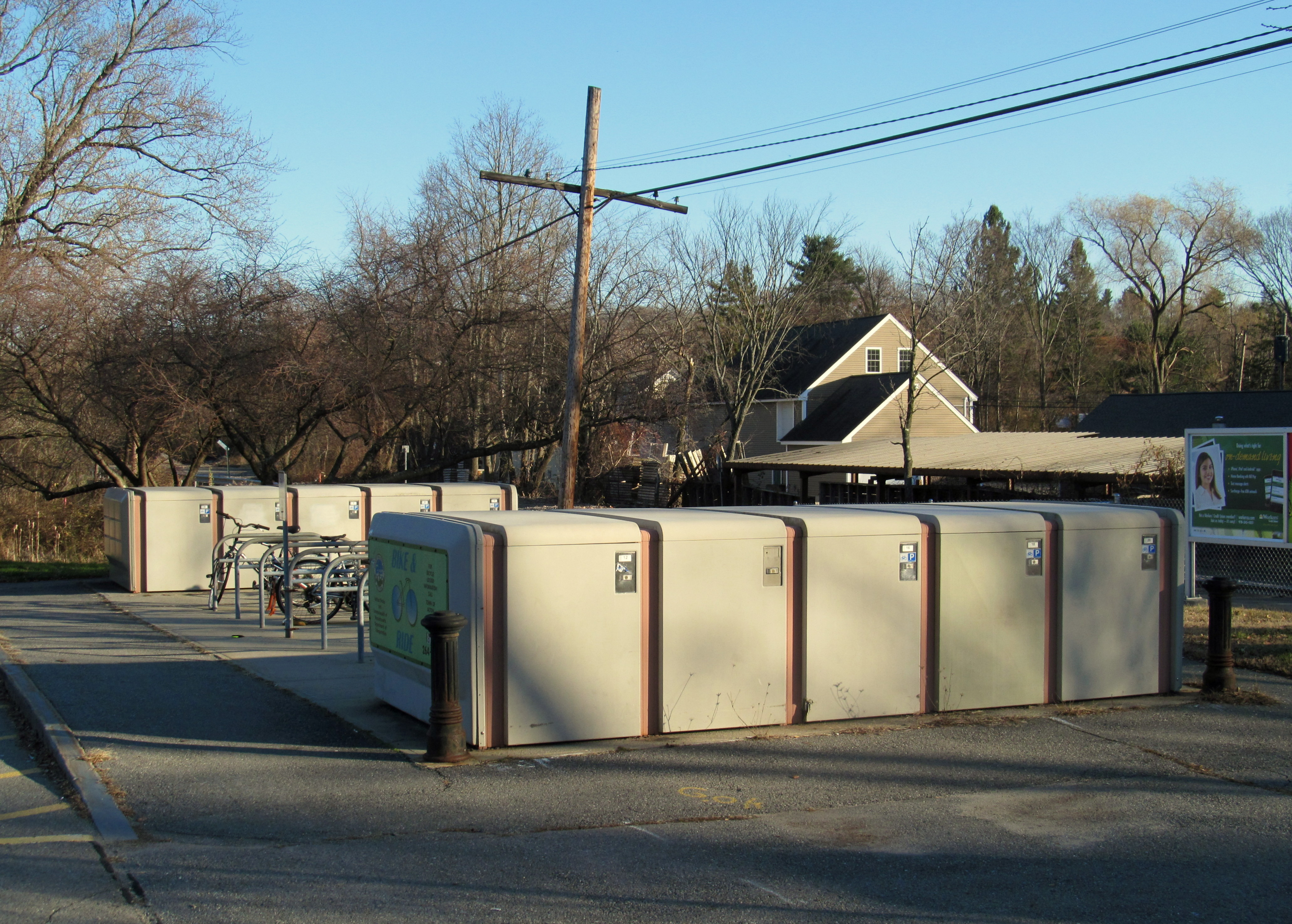
Bicycle parking area

There are 300 parking spaces, including 6 handicapped-accessible spaces, at South Acton split between two lots. The main lot contains 282 spaces, which are split between 155 resident permit parking spaces and 107 daily 12-hour spaces. The secondary "overflow" lot is located two-tenths of a mile from the station on School Street and contains 15 resident permit parking spaces. Resident parking permits cost $200 annually ($50 for seniors), whereas the daily 12-hour spaces cost $6 a day.

Although service increases at Littleton/Route 495, a new garage at North Leominster, and the opening of Wachusett are expected to bleed off demand, insufficient parking at South Acton is considered a town concern. Although no firm plans were in place, town officials stated in January 2014 that they were considering adding parking spots to serve the station and the Assabet River Rail Trail. In February 2015, the town reported that it was considering the purchase of a property to create an additional 100-space parking lot on the south side of the station. Because many spots at the station are reserved for Acton residents, many commuters from other towns find difficulty parking at the station.

South Acton also has bicycle parking areas with 100 spots (62 north side, 38 south side) to accommodate commuters who do not wish to drive to the station. The completion of the Assabet River Rail Trail will eventually allow bicycle commuting from Hudson and Maynard to the station. A Minuteman Bike Share station is also located at South Acton station.

=== Connecting services ===
The town of Maynard began operating a Maynard–South Action shuttle, which connected with peak-hour trains, on April 29, 2002. It was discontinued on July 18, 2003, due to low ridership. A Maynard–South Acton shuttle was again introduced in October 2016. It was discontinued on December 4, 2023.

On September 7, 2010, the town of Acton launched a shuttle service, branded "MinuteVan", between the station and satellite parking areas in West Acton. In November 2015, the town added Cross Acton Transit, an all-day fixed-route bus service connecting North Acton, West Acton, and Acton villages to the station. MinuteVan service was extended to North Acton in late 2017. It was discontinued in 2020 during the COVID-19 pandemic, after which the "MinuteVan" brand was used only for dial-a-ride services.

A bus service between Boxborough and South Acton, funded by the Montachusett Regional Transit Authority, began operating on May 16, 2024. South Acton became the northern terminus of the MetroWest Regional Transit Authority 495 Connector route when it began service on May 2025.
