= Waltham station =

Railroad station in Waltham, Massachusetts, US

Waltham
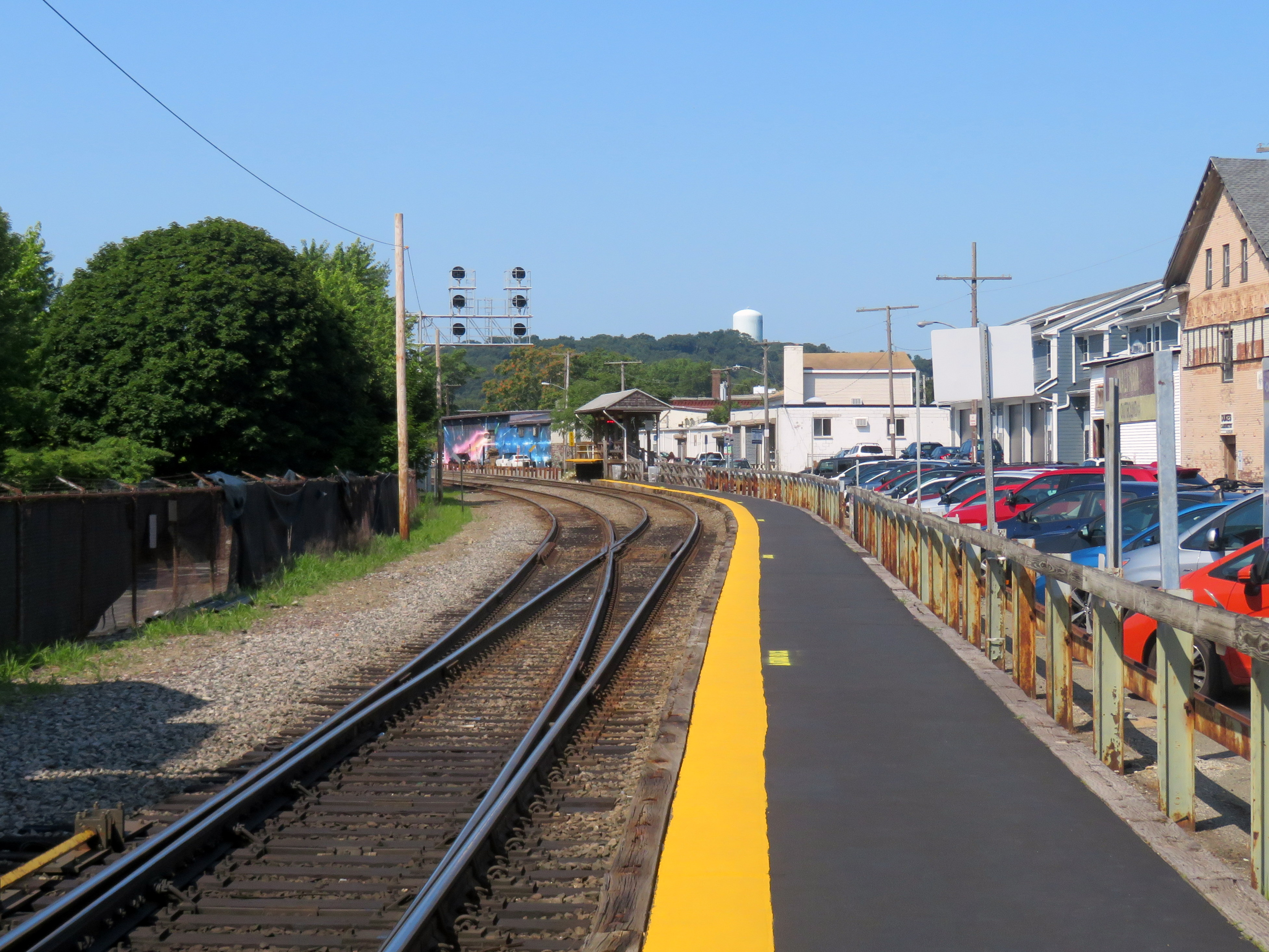
- The outbound platform at Waltham station in 2019

General information
- Location: 75 Carter Street; Waltham, Massachusetts
- Coordinates: 42°22′27.11″N 71°14′10.72″W
- Lines: Fitchburg Line; Watertown Branch (former)
- Platforms: 2 side platforms
- Tracks: 1 (splits into 2 at station)
- Connections: MBTA bus: 61, 70, 553, 554, 556, 558; 128 Business Council: W1

Construction
- Parking: 50 spaces
- Cycle facilities: 8 spaces
- Accessible: Yes

Other information
- Fare zone: 2

History
- Opened: December 20, 1843
- Rebuilt: 1888, c. 1962

Passengers
- 2024: 460 daily boardings

Services
Preceding station	MBTA	Following station
Brandeis/Roberts toward Wachusett	Fitchburg Line	Waverley toward North Station
Location

Waltham station is an MBTA Commuter Rail station in Waltham, Massachusetts, served by the Fitchburg Line. It is located in downtown Waltham adjacent to Central Square (Waltham Common). The station is the transit hub of Waltham, with MBTA bus routes 61, 70, 553, 554, 556, and 558 stopping on Carter Street adjacent to the station.

== Station layout ==
The platform layout at Waltham station

The otherwise double-tracked Fitchburg Line has a short section of single track through downtown Waltham. Despite the single track, trains in different directions stop at separate inbound and outbound platforms; both are side platforms located on the north side of the rail line.

The inbound platform is between the Elm Street and Moody Street grade crossings and serves the single track. The outbound platform is west of Moody Street; the second track splits next to the platform. Both platforms have mini-high segments for accessibility.

== History ==
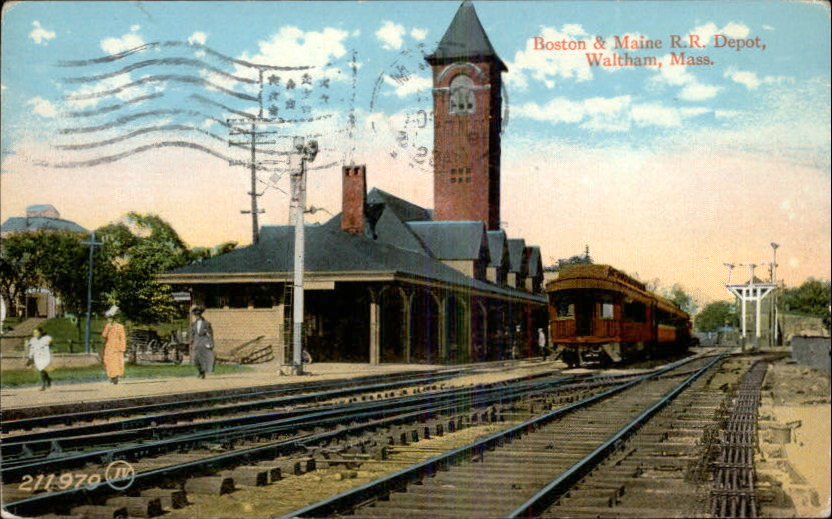
1915 postcard of Waltham station

The Fitchburg Railroad opened west to Waltham on December 20, 1843, then to Concord on June 17, 1844. The Watertown Branch was extended to Waltham in 1851, meeting the Fitchburg mainline with a wye. An interlocking tower at Elm Street controlled the junction. By 1875, the station was located on the north side of the tracks on the west side of Elm Street.

Construction of a new station began in 1887. It was located on the north side of the tracks, just west of the existing station. The new station was made of brick with brownstone trim, with a clocktower. It opened on July 23, 1888.

The Fitchburg Railroad was acquired by the Boston and Maine Railroad (B&M) in 1900. Elimination of the grade crossings at the station was considered in the 1910s, but never completed. Watertown Branch passenger service ended on July 9, 1938, though the line remained in use for freight until the early 20th century.

The station building was demolished around 1962. The Massachusetts Bay Transportation Authority (MBTA) was formed in 1964 and began subsidizing B&M commuter service the following year. Accessible mini-high platforms were added in 2007.
