= Fitchburg Railroad =

American railroad company

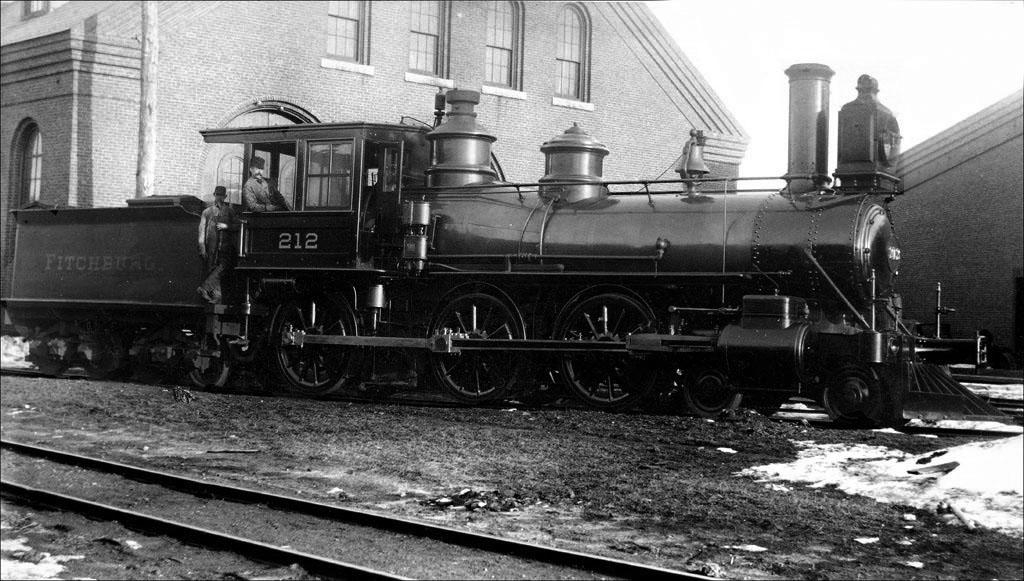
- A locomotive of the Fitchburg railroad in Keene, New Hampshire, in the mid to late 1800s

Overview
- Locale: Boston to Fitchburg, Massachusetts and beyond into Vermont and New York
- Dates of operation: 1840–1919
- Successor: Boston and Maine

Technical
- Track gauge: 4 ft 8 1/2 in (1,435 mm) standard gauge

The Fitchburg Railroad is a former railroad company, which built a railroad line across northern Massachusetts, United States, leading to and through the Hoosac Tunnel. The Fitchburg was leased to the Boston and Maine Railroad in 1900. The main line from Boston to Fitchburg is now operated as the MBTA Fitchburg Line; Pan Am Railways runs freight service on some other portions.

== History ==
=== Early history ===
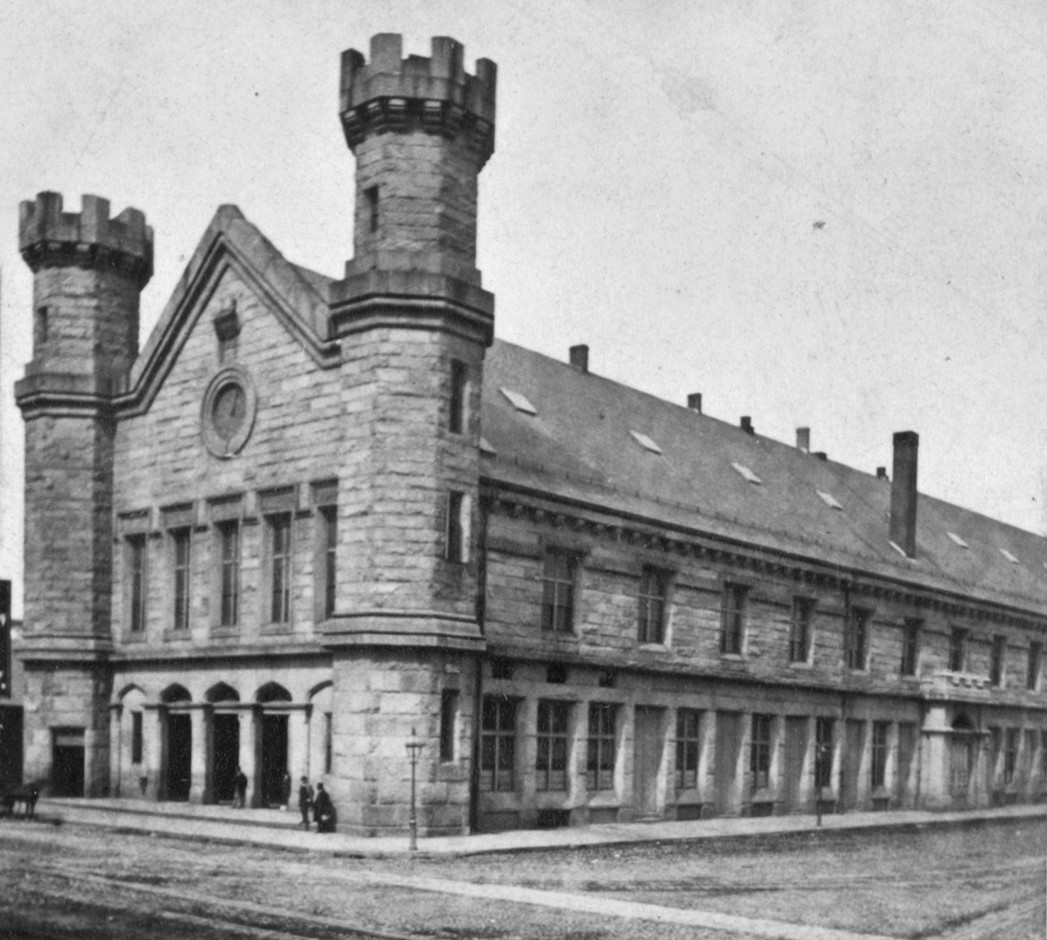
Fitchburg depot, Boston, sometime between 1870 and 1889. One of these towers later became the Jenny Lind Tower.

A horse-drawn railroad from Boston to Brattleboro, Vermont, via Fitchburg was proposed in 1828.

The Charlestown Branch Railroad was incorporated April 4, 1835, as a short branch from the Boston and Lowell Railroad near Lechmere Point in Cambridge, across the Miller's River to the Charlestown waterfront, ending at Swett's Wharf (Sweet's Wharf in some sources) right before the Charlestown Navy Yard. It opened in January 1840 with horse-drawn trains.

The Fitchburg Railroad was incorporated March 3, 1842, to run from Boston to Fitchburg, and bought land next to the Charlestown Branch in May 1843. Construction began on May 20, and the first section to Waltham opened on December 20, 1843, operated by the Charlestown Branch until May 1, 1844. Further sections opened to Concord June 17, 1844, Acton October 1, 1844, Shirley December 30, 1844, and Fitchburg March 5, 1845. The new track next to the Charlestown Branch opened in August 1844; the Fitchburg Railroad leased the Charlestown Branch itself on September 1, 1845, and outright bought the branch on January 31, 1846.

The original Charlestown terminal was southwest of City Square, west of the Warren Bridge (42.370°N 71.063°W). In 1848, the line was rerouted over a new bridge across the Charles River to a downtown Boston terminal on the north side of Causeway Street between Haverhill Street and Beverly Street; the original Charlestown Branch remained in use for freight. North Union Station replaced that terminal in 1893; it remained extant until the 1920s.

In 1854, Henry David Thoreau wrote in his work Walden about his skepticism of the Fitchburg Railroad near Walden Pond. Although Thoreau often resented the noisy trains, he found the railroad line itself fascinating: he frequently studied the vegetation growing along the tracks, as well as the soil layers visible in a railroad cut. He often walked along the tracks to reach Concord from Walden Pond.

A third track was added between Waltham and Roberts in 1886. The Boston and Maine Railroad leased the Fitchburg for 99 years from July 1, 1900, as its Fitchburg Division.

=== Grade crossing eliminations ===
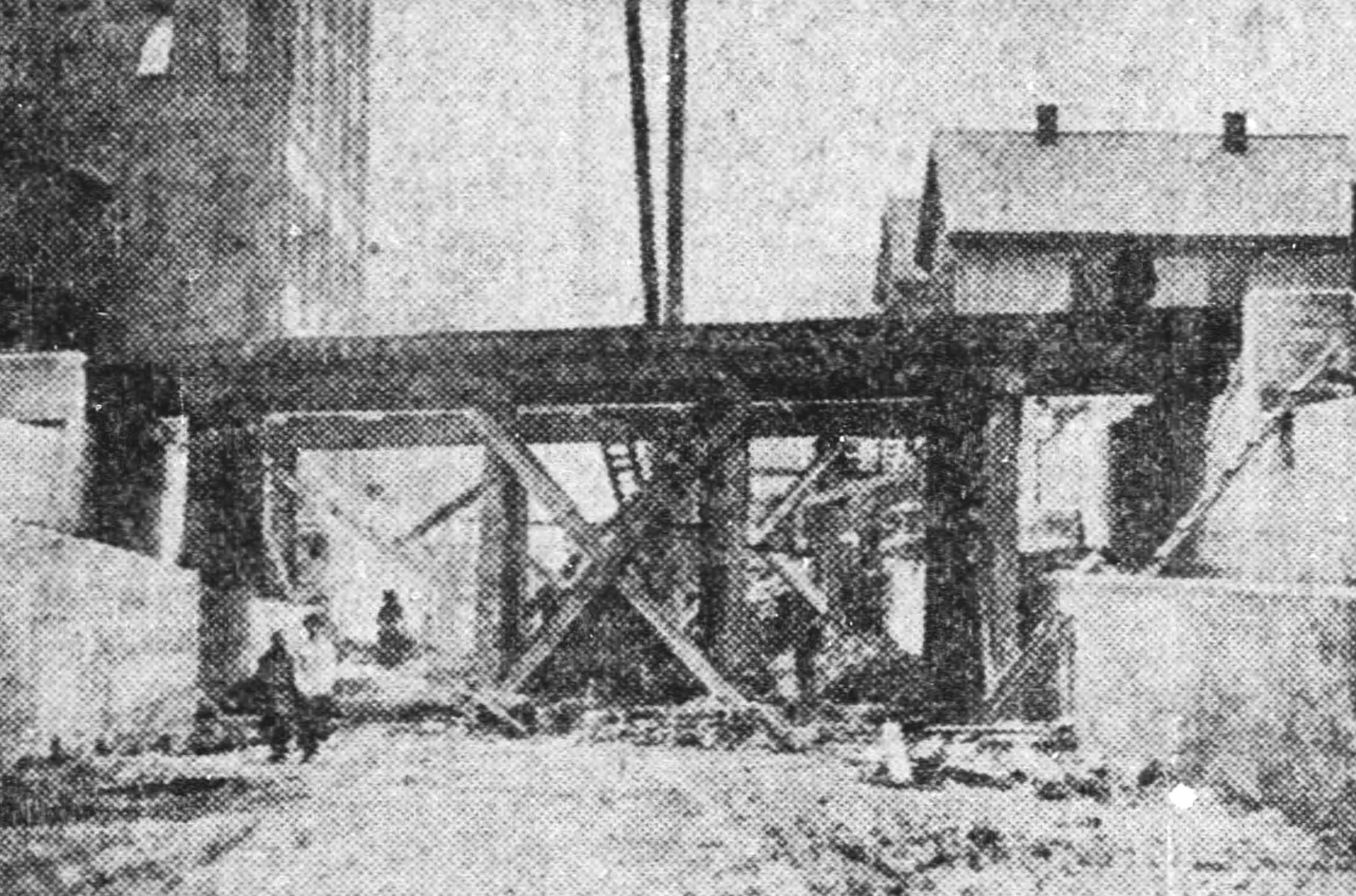
Medford Street grade crossing elimination work in December 1912

The railroad was originally constructed with a number of level crossings in Somerville. The diamond crossing of the Boston and Lowell Railroad was replaced with the Lowell elevated onto "Red Bridge" in 1857. Washington Street and Prospect Street were raised onto bridges in the 19th century; Sacramento Street and Kane Street were cut (with pedestrian "subways" under the tracks) in the 1890s. Planning to eliminate the eleven remaining grade crossings in Somerville, five of which were on the Fitchburg Route mainline, began in 1900.

In 1906, the city engineer proposed to raise 1.8 miles (2.9 km) of the line between Beacon Street and Somerville Avenue to eliminate the five level crossings, but that scheme was not adopted. The Somerville Avenue crossing of the Fitchburg Route and the parallel Grand Junction Branch was replaced by a road bridge in 1908–09, followed by Webster Street in 1911. A road bridge carrying Dane Street and an underpass carrying Medford Street were completed in early 1913, leaving only Park Street.

Numerous grade crossings were eliminated throughout the state in the 1930s; those on the Fitchburg Route included Boston Post Road (Route 20) at Stony Brook in 1930 and at Beaver Brook in 1936, Mohawk Trail in Littleton in 1932, and Leominster–Shirley Road in Lunenburg around 1936. In 1935, the city requested that the Park Street grade crossing be replaced with a bridge as part of a Works Progress Administration-funded grade crossing elimination program. It was not, and the location has continued to see collisions. The tracks were lowered through Waverley Square in 1952 to eliminate a pair of grade crossings there.

=== Cuts ===
Service was cut back from Troy to Williamstown on January 19, 1958. Cheshire Branch and Maynard–South Acton service ended on May 18 amid systemwide cuts. Service west of Greenfield ended on December 30, 1958; stops dropped at that time were Williamstown, North Adams, Hoosac Tunnel, Zoar, Charlemont, and Shelburne Falls. On June 14, 1959, seven stops between Greenfield and Fitchburg (Montague, Lake Pleasant, Erving, Royalston, Baldwinville, East Gardner, and South Ashburnham) plus Stony Brook were dropped as part of another round of systemwide cuts. The four daily round trips west of Fitchburg were discontinued on April 23, 1960, ending service to Greenfield, Millers Falls, Athol, Orange, and Gardner.

On January 18, 1965, service was cut back to West Concord, but was restored to Ayer on June 28, 1965. On March 1, 1975, it was cut back to South Acton. The MBTA bought the line from Boston to Fitchburg, along with many other lines, from the B&M on December 27, 1976. Service was restored to Fitchburg and beyond to Gardner on January 13, 1980. Gardner service was ended on January 1, 1987, when Amtrak took over the MBTA contract, due to a dispute between Amtrak and Guilford; the MBTA only owned the trackage to Fitchburg. Service was re-extended to Wachusett station in 2016.

Guilford Transportation took over the former B&M in June 1983. The Fitchburg Line west of the old Stony Brook Railroad, which now junctions east of the old Ayer Junction, now serves as part of Pan Am Railways' main line between Mattawamkeag, Maine, and Mechanicville, New York.

=== Branches ===
==== Harvard ====
The Harvard Branch Railroad was incorporated and opened in 1849, splitting from the Fitchburg in Somerville and running to Harvard Square. It was never leased or owned by the Fitchburg, and was never successful, closing in 1855.

==== Lexington ====
The Lexington and West Cambridge Railroad was chartered in 1845 and opened in 1846 as a branch from the Fitchburg near the present-day Alewife Brook Reservation area (now considered part of North Cambridge) to Lexington. The Fitchburg operated it from opening, leasing it from 1847 to 1859. In 1868 it was reorganized as the Lexington and Arlington Railroad and bought by the Boston and Lowell Railroad in 1870. The connection to the Fitchburg was cut (but reopened in 1927). Passenger service ceased in January 1977 due to a blizzard, never to resume. Freight operation ended in 1981, and the line was formally abandoned in 1991 to make way for the Minuteman Commuter Bike Trail.

==== Watertown ====
The Watertown Branch Railroad was incorporated 1847, first as an independent short line RR, but was quickly taken over by the Fitchburg. It ran from the main line in Cambridge through Watertown to Waltham. It opened in 1851 and was soon the main passenger line between Boston and Waltham and one of the few branch lines to be double tracked. Passenger service on the line ended in 1938. The middle section of the line in the Watertown Square area was abandoned in 1960. This split the branch in two. The west side of the branch was mostly abandoned in 2000. The east side of the branch contained only one customer, Newly Weds Foods. The last delivery made was in early 2007, with the last move occurring on the line in early 2008. The entire branch is now either abandoned or out of service, and the east side of the right-of-way was converted to a rail trail - the Watertown-Cambridge Greenway.

==== Marlborough ====
The Lancaster and Sterling Railroad was incorporated in 1846 and immediately merged with the Fitchburg Railroad. It was built from a junction at South Acton roughly southwest to Hudson, opening in 1850. The Marlborough Branch Railroad was incorporated in 1852 and opened in 1855, continuing the line from Hudson south to Marlborough. It was leased by the Fitchburg in 1853 and bought outright in 1863. This branch made South Acton a major junction and service point on the Fitchburg Route. A turntable and engine house existed in South Acton to service trains well into the 20th century. Passenger service from Marlborough ceased in 1932, and the section between Maynard and Hudson was abandoned in 1943. The section between Hudson and Marlborough saw its last passenger traffic via the Central Massachusetts Railroad in 1939, and the last passenger traffic to Hudson in 1965 (by then subsidized by the MBTA as the Central Mass Branch), but it was not abandoned until 1980. Passenger service to Maynard via the Fitchburg mainline in South Acton ceased in 1958. The line was formally abandoned in 1979. It has been converted into the Assabet River Rail Trail.

==== Peterborough and Shirley ====
The Peterborough and Shirley Railroad was incorporated in 1845 and opened as a branch from the Fitchburg in Ayer to West Townsend in 1848, continuing to Mason, New Hampshire, in 1849 or 1850. The Fitchburg Railroad leased it in 1847 and bought it in 1860, with an extension to Greenville opening by 1876.

The Squannacook River Rail Trail is a 3.7-mile (6.0 km) rail trail between Townsend and the Bertoxxi Wildlife Management Area. The trail opened in 2020 after the completion of tree clearing, though rails and ties were still in place. In July 2020, the state awarded $100,000 for removing tracks and paving the western third of the trail. State funding was awarded in 2022 for construction of a 0.6-mile (0.97 km) segment in Groton.

==== Milford ====
The Brookline and Milford Railroad was incorporated and built in 1892 from the Peterborough and Shirley at Squannacook Junction north to the Wilton Railroad in Milford, New Hampshire. It was merged into the Fitchburg in 1895.

=== Vermont and Massachusetts Railroad ===
The Vermont and Massachusetts Railroad was chartered in 1844 and immediately merged the Brattleborough and Fitchburg Railroad of Vermont into itself. The first section, from Fitchburg to Baldwinville, opened in 1847 and was operated by the Fitchburg Railroad until 1849. Further extensions opened to Athol and Miller's Falls in 1848, and to Brattleboro, Vermont, in 1850. Later in 1850, a branch from Grout's Corner west to Greenfield opened. A short branch to Turner's Falls opened in 1870 or 1871.

The original main line north from Miller's Falls was leased to the Rutland Railroad in 1870, which leased itself to the Vermont Central Railroad in 1871, which became the Central Vermont Railroad in 1872. This was a continuation of the New London Northern Railroad, built south from Miller's Falls in 1867 and also leased to the Vermont Central in 1871.

In 1874 the Fitchburg Railroad leased the rest of the V&M, extending its line west to Greenfield (and beyond via the Troy and Greenfield Railroad - see below).

==== Ashburnham ====
The Ashburnham Railroad was chartered in 1871 and opened in 1874 from the V&M at South Ashburnham to Ashburnham. The Fitchburg bought it in 1885.

==== Turners Falls ====
The Turners Falls Branch connected the main line at Turners Falls Junction to Turners Falls. It opened in 1871.

=== Cheshire ===
The Cheshire Railroad was chartered in New Hampshire in 1844, consolidating with the Winchendon Railroad of Massachusetts (chartered 1845) in 1845. The first section opened in 1847, from the Vermont and Massachusetts Railroad at South Ashburnham to Winchendon; an extension to Troy, New Hampshire, also opened in 1847. Extensions to Keene, New Hampshire, and Bellows Falls, Vermont, opened in 1848 and 1849, forming a connection between the Fitchburg Railroad and the Vermont Central Railroad (via trackage rights over the V&M east of South Ashburnham).

The Cheshire Railroad was merged into the Fitchburg in 1890, becoming the Cheshire Branch. Passenger service ended in 1958, and the line was abandoned in sections, Winchendon north in 1970 (after the bankruptcy of the Rutland RR) and in 1984 for the rest.

==== Monadnock ====
The Monadnock Railroad was incorporated in 1848, but did not open from Winchendon to Jaffrey, New Hampshire, until December 1870 and to Peterborough in 1871, from which the Peterborough and Hillsborough Railroad continued the line north after 1878. The Boston, Barre and Gardner Railroad, running south from Winchendon, leased the Monadnock in 1874, but transferred the lease to the Cheshire Railroad in 1880 to keep it out of the hands of the Boston and Albany. The Fitchburg took control of the Monadnock in 1890.

==== Boston, Barre and Gardner ====
The Barre and Worcester Railroad was chartered in 1847 and reorganized in 1857 as the Boston, Barre and Gardner Railroad. It opened in 1871 between the Worcester and Nashua Railroad at Barber (from which it ran to Worcester via trackage rights) and the V&M in Gardner. An extension in 1874 took it to the Cheshire Railroad at Winchendon.

The BB&G leased the Monadnock Railroad in 1874, but reassigned the lease to the Cheshire in 1880. The BB&G was merged into the Fitchburg in 1885.

=== Troy and Greenfield ===
The Troy and Greenfield Railroad was incorporated and chartered in 1848, with a planned line from the Vermont border in Williamstown east through the Hoosac Tunnel to Greenfield. The first section opened from the state line to the west end of the tunnel at North Adams in 1859. The tunnel itself opened in 1875, before which the Troy and Boston Railroad leased the T&G. The T&G was consolidated into the Fitchburg Railroad in 1887.

The Southern Vermont Railroad was chartered in 1848 to connect the T&G across the southwest corner of Vermont to the New York state line. It opened in 1859 and was leased by the Troy and Boston Railroad, but in 1860 the T&G bought it. The Fitchburg bought the Southern Vermont directly in 1891.

The Troy and Boston Railroad was chartered in 1849 to continue the line west to Troy, New York. It was consolidated into the Fitchburg in 1887. The Troy and Bennington Railroad was organized in 1851 to build a branch from the Troy and Boston at Hoosick Junction to the Vermont state line towards Bennington. It opened in 1852, continuing as the Western Vermont Railroad (leased by the Troy and Boston from 1857 until it was reorganized into the Bennington and Rutland Railway in 1865).

=== Boston, Hoosac Tunnel and Western ===
The Boston, Hoosac Tunnel and Western Railway opened in 1879 between the Massachusetts state line and Mechanicville, New York. Its route closely paralleled the Troy and Boston from Johnsonville eastward. The line was further extended west to Rotterdam Junction in 1884. The Fitchburg obtained stock control of the BHT&W in 1887 and purchased it in 1892. Surveys for a planned extension of the line west to Buffalo, with a branch to Oswego, were instead used by the West Shore Railroad.

The Hoosac Tunnel and Saratoga Railway and the Saratoga Lake Railway were both chartered in 1880 and was leased by the BHT&W in 1882. In 1886 they were consolidated to form the Troy, Saratoga and Northern Railroad. The combined line was built in 1886 and 1887, with a main line from Mechanicville (never built south to Troy) north and west to Saratoga Springs, and a branch east to Schuylerville. The Fitchburg Railroad leased it in 1887.

== Station and junction listing ==
This list shows all stations and junctions that have existed on the original Fitchburg Railroad between Boston and Fitchburg. Minor relocations of stations are not noted. A list of current stations is also available.

Miles	City	Station	Connections and notes
0.0	Boston	North Station	
0.6	Boston	Charlestown	Flag stop after original Charlestown terminal closed in 1848
0.7	Boston	Boston Engine Terminal	A flag stop for railroad employees only
1.4	Somerville	East Cambridge	Closed by the late 19th century
2.0	Somerville	Union Square	Closed in 1938
2.6	Somerville	Somerville	Closed in 1938
3.4	Cambridge	Porter	Formerly North Cambridge and Cambridge
4.1	Cambridge	West Cambridge	Junction with Watertown Branch and Lexington Branch. Junction with Central Massachusetts Railroad from 1927 to 1952. Originally Brick Yards.
5.5	Belmont	Hills Crossing	Junction with Fitchburg Cutoff
6.4	Belmont	Belmont Center	Originally Wellington Hill.
7.3	Belmont	Waverley	
8.3	Waltham	Clematis Brook	Junction with the Central Massachusetts Railroad (after 1952); closed in June 1978.
9.3	Waltham	Beaver Brook	Closed in June 1978.
9.9	Waltham	Waltham	Junction with Watertown Branch.
10.6	Waltham	Riverview	Closed on January 17, 1965
11.5	Waltham	Brandeis/Roberts	Originally Roberts
12.2	Weston	Stony Brook	Closed in 1959.
13.2	Weston	Kendal Green	Originally Weston.
13.7	Weston	Hastings	Closed on December 14, 2020.
14.7	Weston	Silver Hill	Closed on December 14, 2020.
16.7	Lincoln	Lincoln	originally South Lincoln
17.8	Lincoln	Baker Bridge	
18.7	Concord	Lake Walden	Served an amusement park in the late 19th century.
20.1	Concord	Concord	
21.9	Concord	West Concord	Junction with Framingham and Lowell Railroad.
25.3	Acton	South Acton	Junction with Marlborough Branch.
26.8	Acton	West Acton	Closed on April 30, 1975.
28.9	Boxborough	Boxboro	
30.1	Littleton	Littleton/Route 495	
31.5	Littleton	Littleton	Closed on April 30, 1975.
33.5	Ayer	Willows	Junction with Stony Brook Branch after 1946; closed in 1961
36.1	Ayer	Ayer	Junction with Worcester, Nashua and Rochester Railroad and Peterborough and Shirley Railroad; junction with Stony Brook Branch until 1946.
39.2	Shirley	Shirley	
42.1	Lunenburg	Lunenburg	
45.2	Leominster	North Leominster	
49.5	Fitchburg	Fitchburg	Junction with Fitchburg and Worcester Railroad
