= Brandeis/Roberts station =

Railroad station in Waltham, Massachusetts, US

Brandeis/Roberts
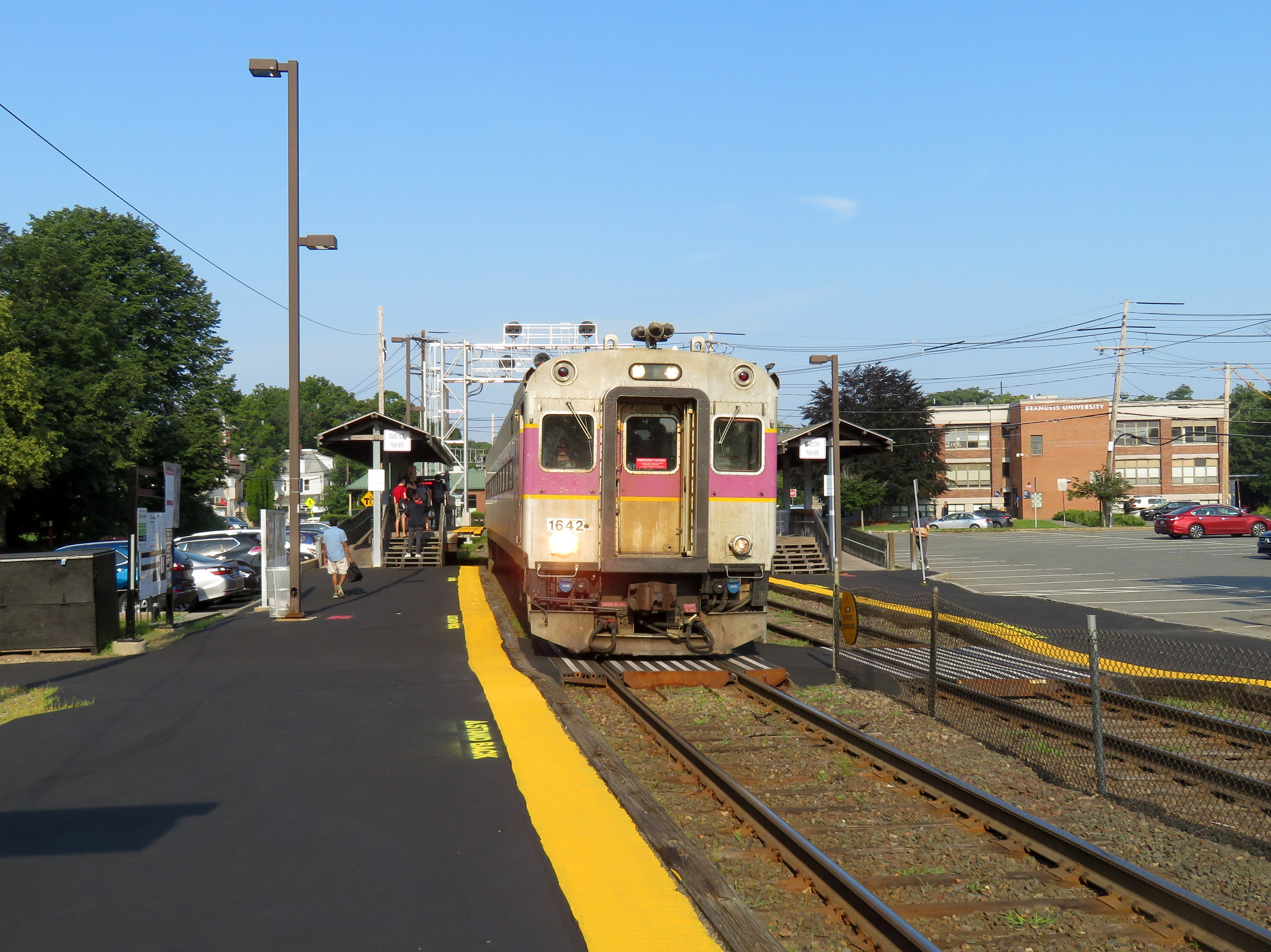
- An inbound train arriving at Brandeis/Roberts station in 2019

General information
- Location: 1 Sawyer Road; Waltham, Massachusetts
- Coordinates: 42.36193°N 71.25972°W
- Line: Fitchburg Route
- Platforms: 2 side platforms
- Tracks: 2
- Connections: MBTA bus: 553

Construction
- Parking: 70 spaces ($4.00 fee)
- Cycle facilities: 8 spaces
- Accessible: Yes

Other information
- Fare zone: 2

History
- Opened: c. 1850
- Former names: Roberts

Passengers
- 2024: 386 daily boardings

Services
Preceding station	MBTA	Following station
Kendal Green toward Wachusett	Fitchburg Line	Waltham toward North Station
Location

Brandeis/Roberts station is an MBTA Commuter Rail station in Waltham, Massachusetts. It serves the Fitchburg Line and is located on the edge of the campus of Brandeis University. The station is fully accessible, with mini-high platforms serving both tracks.

== History ==
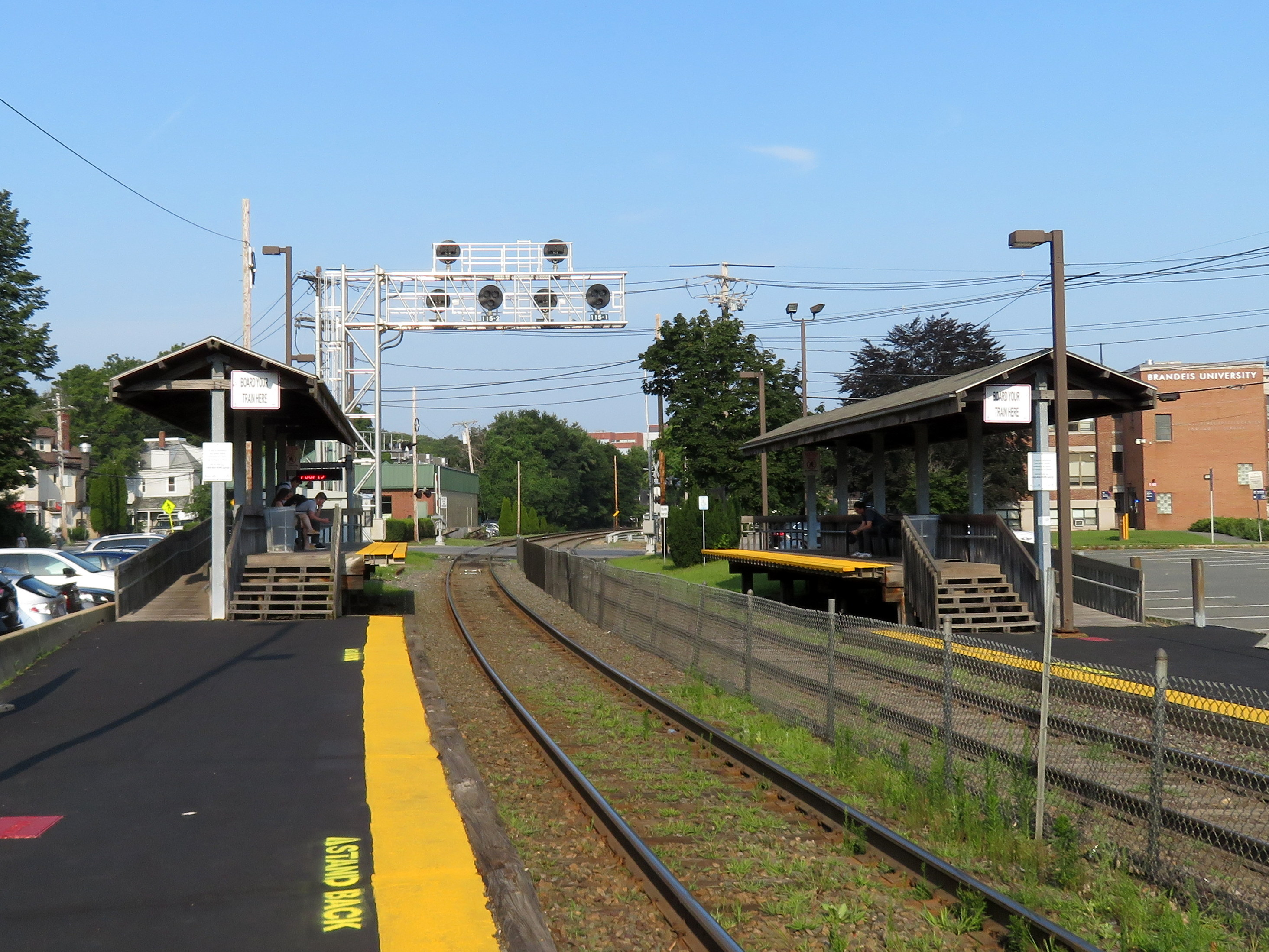
Mini-high platforms installed around 1990

The Fitchburg Railroad opened from Waltham to Concord on June 17, 1844. A flag stop was open at the South Street crossing by 1852. It was named Roberts Crossing (later shortened to Roberts) after John Roberts, who operated a nearby paper mill.

New stations at Roberts and nearby Stony Brook were built in 1887. The railroad opened a roundhouse at Roberts in early 1893, replacing an older facility in Waltham. The Boston and Maine Railroad (B&M) closed the station building in 1937, but trains continued to stop at the platform.

In 1977 or 1978, the station was renamed Brandeis–Roberts (later styled Brandeis/Roberts) to denote the growing university. A $70,000 renovation of the station was completed on December 18, 1986. Accessible mini-high platforms were installed either in that renovation or around 1991.
