= Waverley station (MBTA) =

Railroad station in Belmont, Massachusetts, US

Waverley
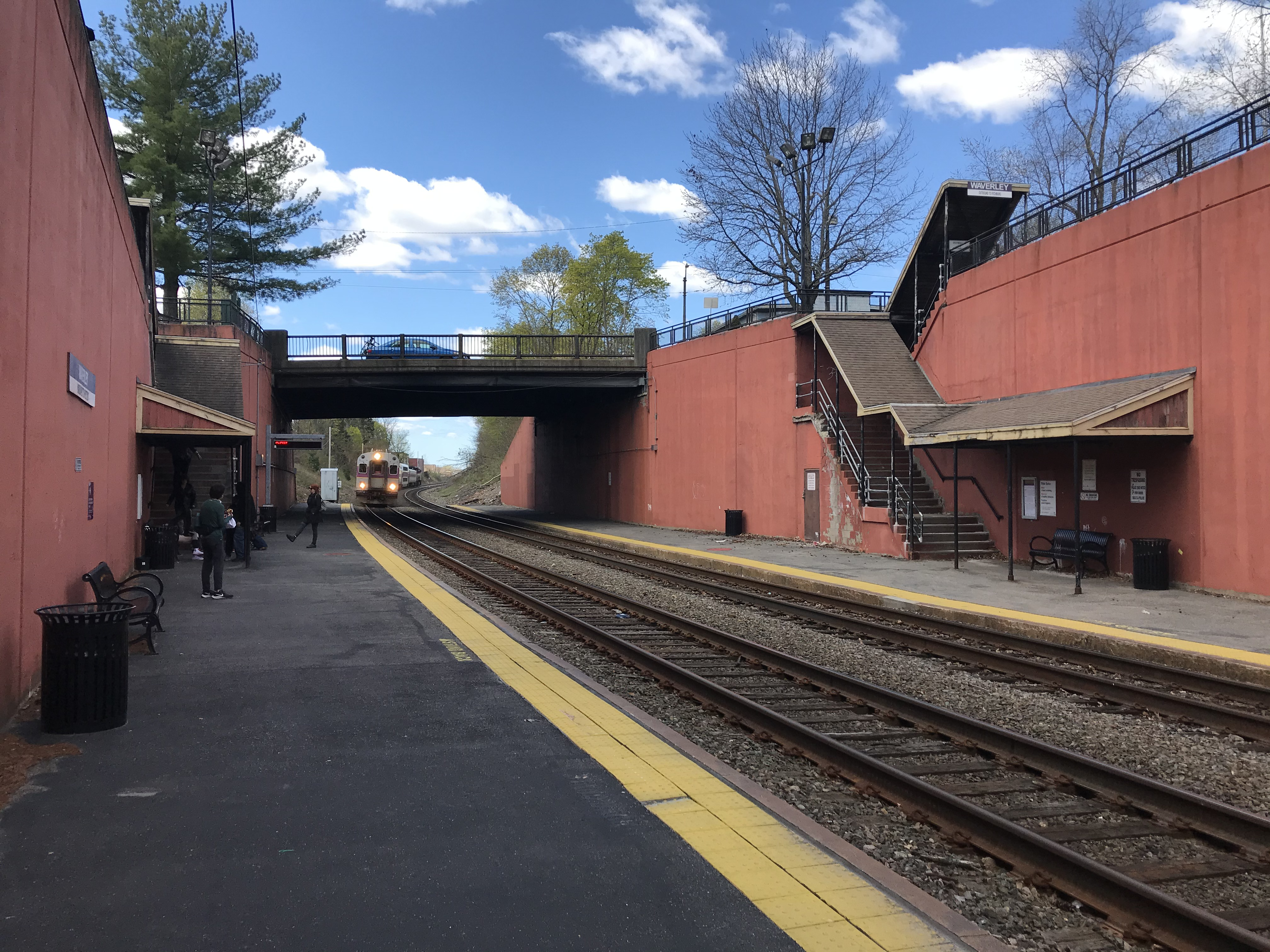
- Waverley station in 2022

General information
- Location: 525 Trapelo Road; Belmont, Massachusetts
- Coordinates: 42°23′16.22″N 71°11′24.64″W
- Line: Fitchburg Route
- Platforms: 2 side platforms
- Tracks: 2
- Connections: MBTA bus: 73, 554

Construction
- Accessible: No

Other information
- Fare zone: 1

History
- Opened: 1860; March 4, 1974
- Closed: 1958
- Rebuilt: 1952

Passengers
- 2024: 179 daily boardings

Services
Preceding station	MBTA	Following station
Waltham toward Wachusett	Fitchburg Line	Belmont Center toward North Station
Former services
Preceding station	Boston and Maine Railroad	Following station
Clematis Brook toward Northampton	Central Mass Branch (closed 1952)	Belmont toward Boston
Location

Waverley station is an MBTA Commuter Rail station in Belmont, Massachusetts. It serves the Fitchburg Line. It is located below grade in Waverley Square in the triangle of Trapelo Road, Lexington Street, and Church Street in western Belmont.

== History ==
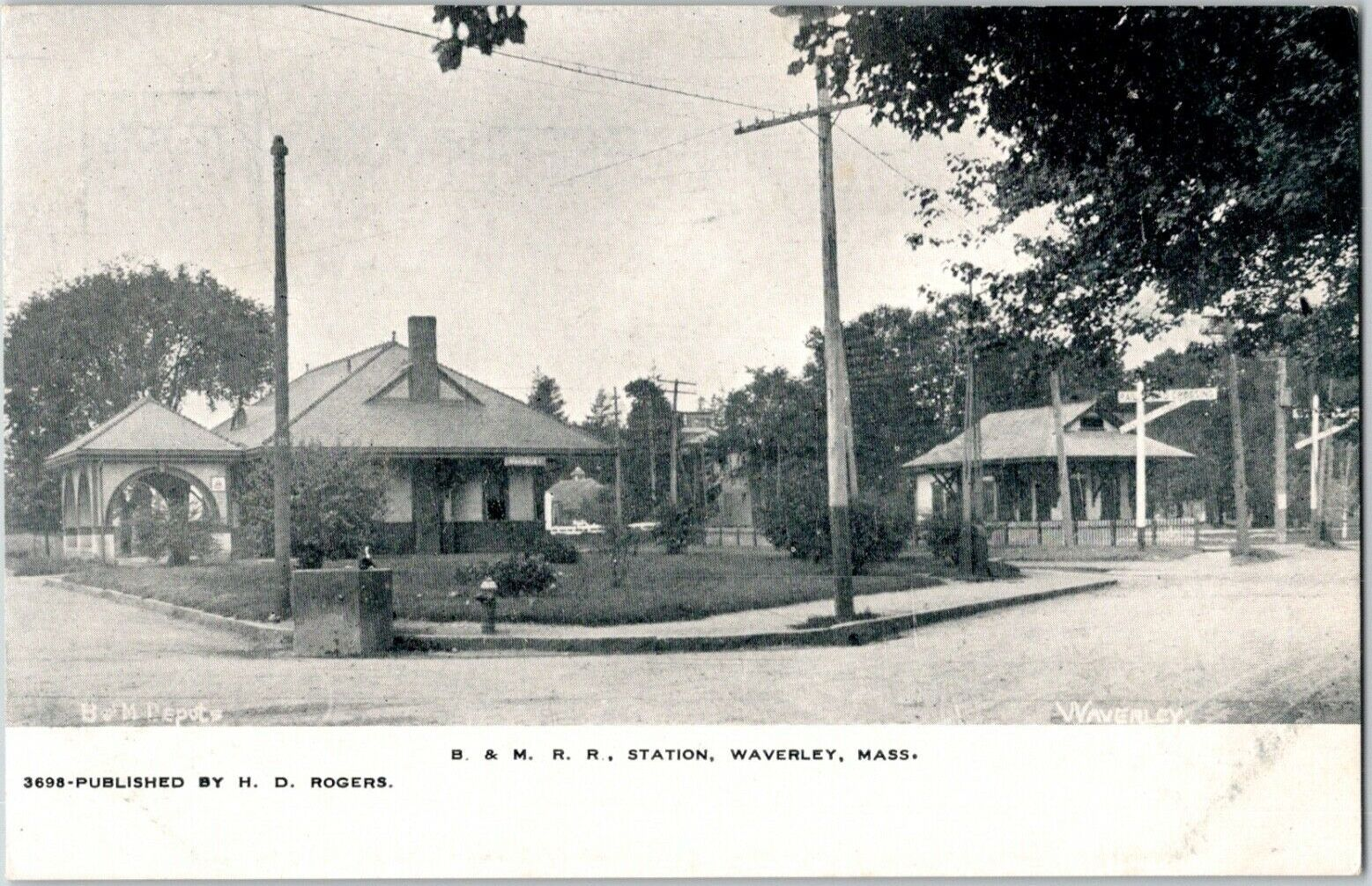
Ex-Fitchburg Railroad station at left and ex-Central Massachusetts Railroad station at right around 1905. By this time, both railroads and stations were under control of the Boston & Maine Railroad.

The Fitchburg Railroad opened through Belmont on December 20, 1843, but no station stop at Waverley Square existed until about 1860. Service on the Massachusetts Central Railroad which ran parallel to the Fitchburg, began in 1881, and operations continued under the successor Central Massachusetts Railroad by 1885. The two railroads had separate station buildings, both of which remained in use until somewhat after both railroads were consolidated under the Boston and Maine Railroad (B&M).

The tracks originally ran through the square at grade, with level crossings of Trapelo Road and Lexington Street. In August 1951, the town approved an agreement with the state and the B&M for a $1.125 million state-funded project to lower the tracks 18 feet (5.5 m) to eliminate the crossings. The work was completed in 1952, at which time Central Mass Branch trains were moved from their parallel tracks onto the Fitchburg main. All service to Waverley and nearby Belmont Center station ended in 1958.

Service to Belmont Center and Waverley resumed on March 4, 1974. The Central Mass Branch had been discontinued in 1971, so all service was on the South Acton (now Fitchburg) Line. The station building was gone by 1977. Weekend service was discontinued at the two stops on January 30, 1981 as part of general cutbacks, but restored on December 6, 1993.

A 2004 MBTA proposal called for a five-story air rights building above the station. The 2005 Fitchburg Commuter Rail Line Improvement Implementation Plan called for consolidating Waverley and Belmont stations into a single station between the locations. In 2015, the MBTA considered closing either Waverley or Belmont station due to the cost of making Waverley station accessible. In 2024, the MBTA began updating the 2014-completed plans for making the station accessible. The updated plans were to consider 400-foot (120 m)-long platforms as well as standard 800-foot (240 m) platforms. In December 2025, the MBTA indicated that 200-foot (61 m) and 400-foot platforms had instead been considered. Ramps, single elevators, and redundant elevators were considered for accessibility. Projected costs were $62–76 million.
