= Roberts station =

Roberts station may refer to:

- A flag stop on the Sudbury-White River train, Ontario, Canada
- Brandeis/Roberts station, Massachusetts, US
