= Stony Brook station (Boston and Maine Railroad) =

Stony Brook
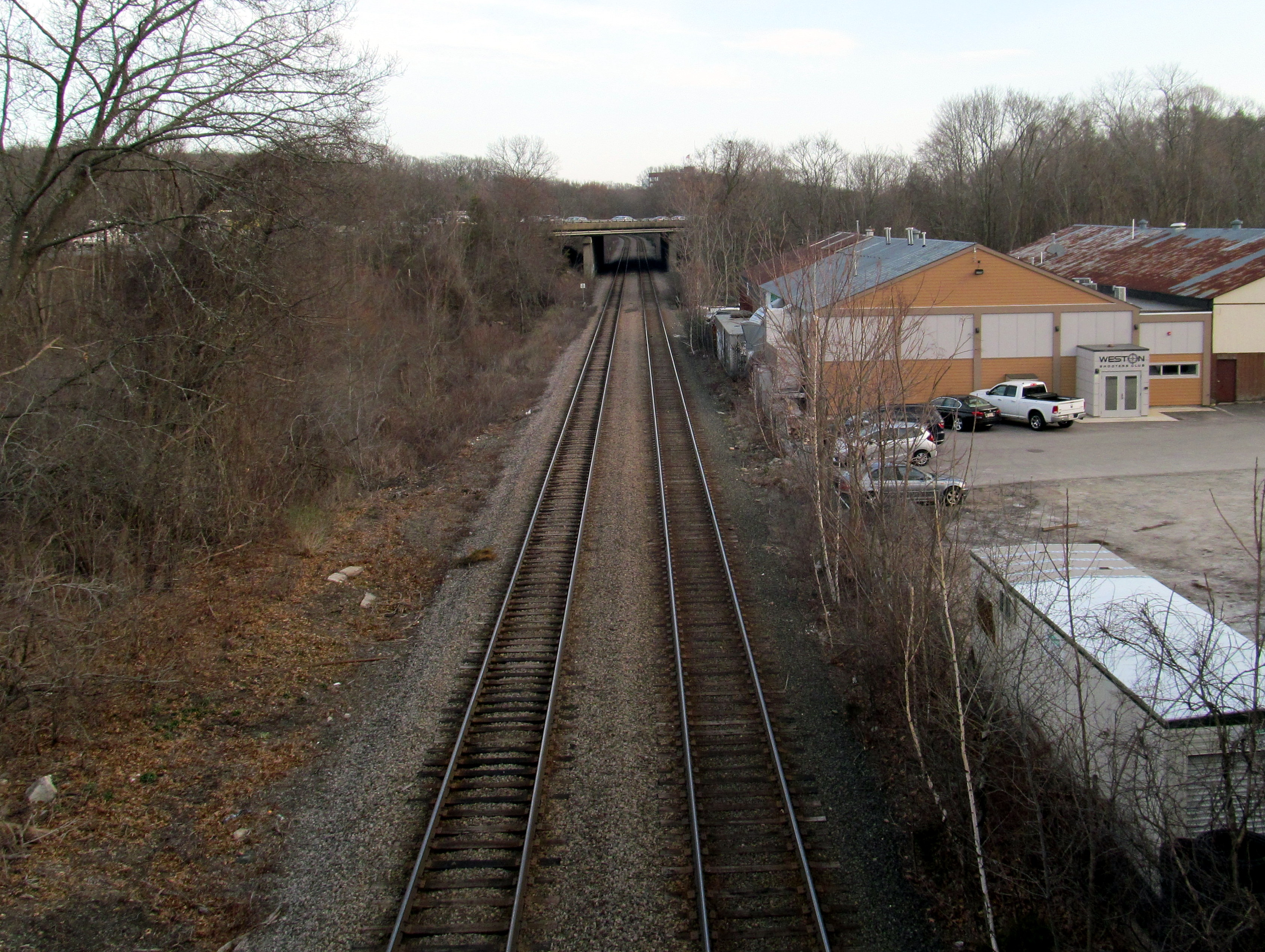
- The former station site, photographed in 2017

General information
- Location: U.S. Route 20; Weston, Massachusetts
- Coordinates: 42°22′8.16″N 71°16′15.42″W
- Line(s): Fitchburg Route

History
- Closed: June 14, 1959

Former services
Preceding station	Boston and Maine Railroad	Following station
Kendal Green toward Fitchburg	Boston – Fitchburg	Roberts toward Boston
Location

Stony Brook station was a Boston and Maine Railroad station in Weston, Massachusetts along what is currently the Massachusetts Bay Transportation Authority (MBTA) Fitchburg Line. The station was located adjacent to the Upper Post Road (US-20), with a building on the inbound (southwest) side of the tracks. It was named for Stony Brook, which runs through Weston.

== History ==
Stony Brook station was open on the Fitchburg Railroad by 1849. When the Central Massachusetts Railroad was first being planned in the late 1870s, it was to have diverged from the Fitchburg Railroad mainline at Stony Brook Junction, just past the station. However, a separate route through Waltham was built instead, and the Central Mass instead crossed the Fitchburg on a bridge at Stony Brook Junction. The Stony Brook bridge was built in 1896 and is a riveted lattice truss bridge on stone abutments.

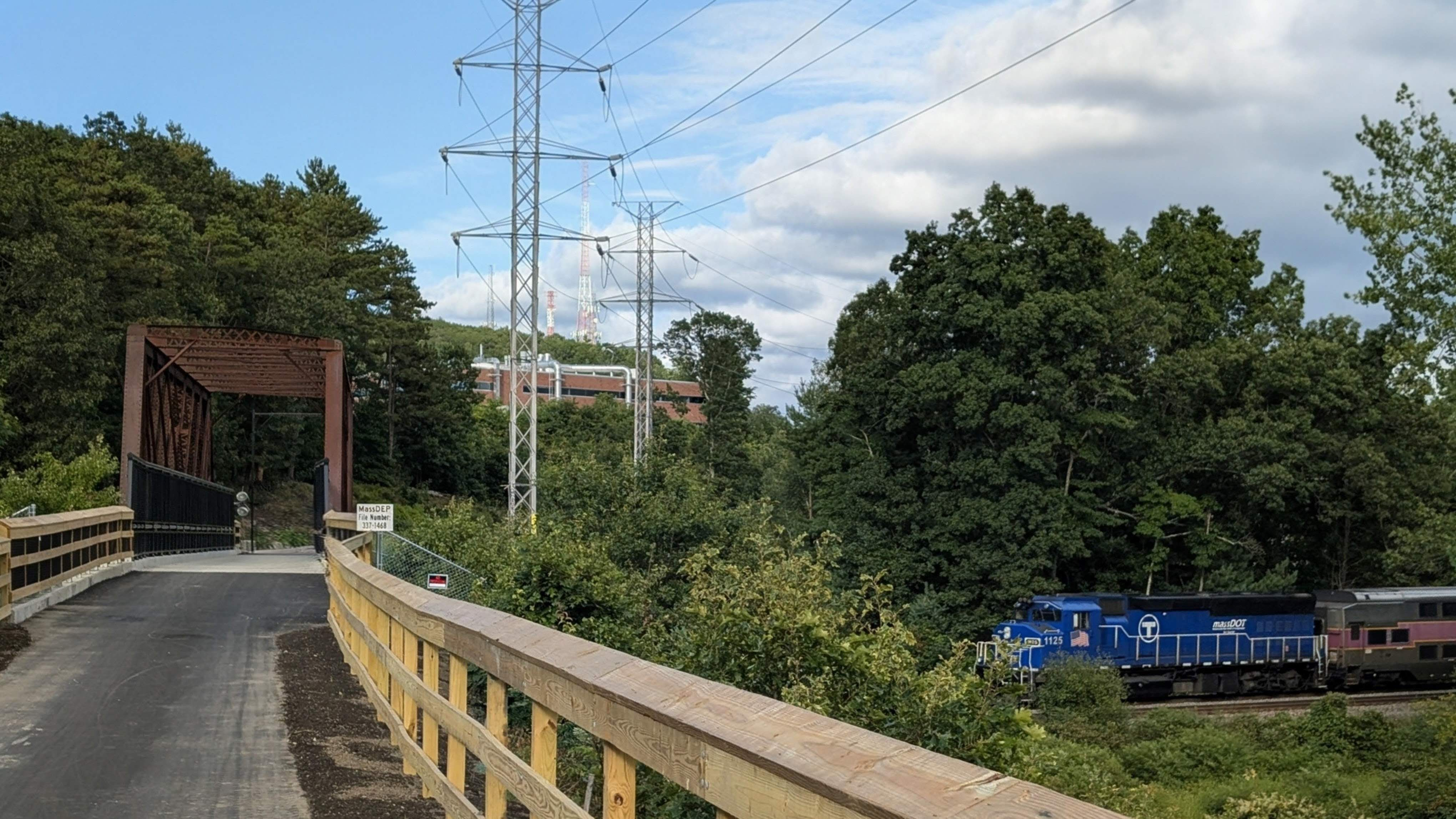
Stony Brook Bridge converted to Mass Central Rail Trail—Wayside, August 2025

The original station served for four decades. New stations at Stony Brook and nearby Roberts were built in 1887. The adjacent grade crossing of the Boston Post Road was replaced by a road bridge in 1930. In December 1958, the B&M proposed to close Stony Brook station, along with ten other stations on the line. The station was closed along with seven of the other stations as part of systemwide cuts on June 14, 1959.

The Massachusetts Bay Transportation Authority (MBTA) has proposed a park-and-ride station at the former Stony Brook site on several occasions. A new station with a parking garage was proposed in 1973. In 1989, the MBTA considered moving Kendal Green station to the south (near the former Stony Brook site) to create a park and ride "superstation" for Route 128, similar to Route 128 station. The MBTA again considered a park-and-ride station at the site in 1998.
