= Troy and Greenfield Railroad =

Troy & Greenfield Railroad and connections, 1848-1851

The Troy and Greenfield Railroad, chartered in 1848, ran from Greenfield, Massachusetts, United States, to the Vermont state line. It was leased to the Troy and Boston Railroad in 1856, then consolidated into Fitchburg Railroad 1887 which in turn was acquired by Boston and Maine Railroad by lease in 1900.

== Station list ==
- Troy, New York
- Lansingburg, New York
- Melrose, New York
- East Schaghticoke, New York
- Valley Falls, New York
- Johnsonville, New York
- Buskirk, New York
- East Buskirk, New York
- Eagle Bridge, New York
- Hoosick Junction, New York
- Hoosick Falls, New York
- Hoosick, New York
- Petersburg Junction, New York
- North Pownal, Vermont
- Pownal, Vermont
- Williamstown, Massachusetts
- Blackington Station, Massachusetts
- Greylock Station, Massachusetts
- North Adams, Massachusetts
- Hoosac Tunnel
- Hoosac Tunnel Station Connection with Hoosac Tunnel and Wilmington Railroad
- Zoar Station, Massachusetts
- Charlemont, Massachusetts
- Buckland, Massachusetts
- Shelburne Falls, Massachusetts
- Bardwells Ferry, Massachusetts
- South River, Massachusetts Connection with Conway Electric Street Railway
- West Deerfield, Massachusetts
- Greenfield, Massachusetts
