= Montachusett Regional Transit Authority =

Public transportation organization for Montachusett Region, Massachusetts

Montachusett Regional Transit Authority (MART)

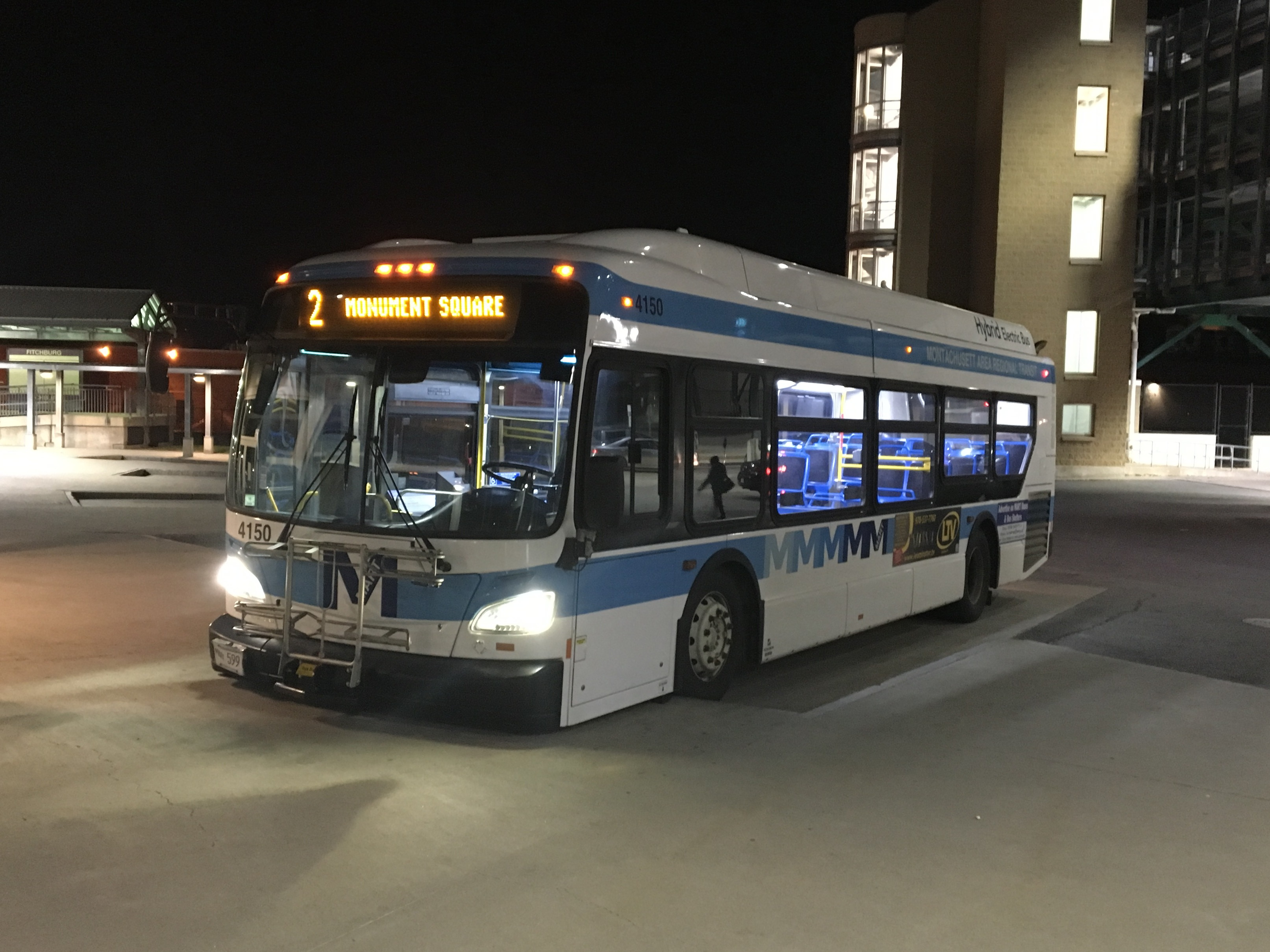
- A route 2 bus at the Fitchburg Intermodal Transportation Center
- Founded: August 1978
- Headquarters: 1427R Water Street; Fitchburg, Massachusetts
- Service area: Montachusett Region
- Service type: fixed-route bus service, shuttle service, and paratransit service
- Routes: 16 fixed routes, 2 shuttle services
- Fleet: 26 buses, 177 vans and 2 Trolley-replica buses
- Administrator: Bruno Fisher
- Website: www.mrta.us

The Montachusett Regional Transit Authority (MART) is a public, nonprofit organization established under Chapter 161B of the Massachusetts General Laws to provide public transportation to the Montachusett Region. MART is one of Massachusetts' 15 regional transit authorities and provides public transportation to 21 communities within the Montachusett region consisting of the cities of Fitchburg, Leominster and Gardner, and the towns of Athol, Ashburnham, Ashby, Ayer, Bolton, Boxborough, Hardwick, Harvard, Hubbardston, Lancaster, Littleton, Lunenburg, Royalston, Shirley, Sterling, Stow, Templeton, Westminster, and Winchendon.

MART provides 16 fixed-route bus services, 2 shuttle services, and paratransit services to the Montachusett Region. MART also operates the parking areas at three MBTA Commuter Rail Fitchburg Line stations at North Leominster, Fitchburg Intermodal Transportation Center, and Wachusett, with local and intercity bus connections to all three stations.

MART has a working collaboration with Fitchburg State University to offer faculty, staff, and students free rides on the Fitchburg/Leominster fixed-route bus line.

MART uses MBTA's CharlieCard smart card fare system. MART provides Monthly Passes, 14-Consecutive Day passes, and Stored Value good for use on any of MART’s fixed-route buses in the region. Stored Value can be used throughout Massachusetts, where the CharlieCard is accepted.

== Fixed-route schedules ==
=== Fitchburg/Leominster ===
- 1: Intermodal Transportation Center - Monument Square - The Mall at Whitney Field- Kings Corner
- 2: Intermodal Transportation Center - Monument Square via Route 12
- 3: Intermodal Transportation Center - Kings Corner - The Mall at Whitney Field - Monument Square
- 4: Intermodal Transportation Center - Fitchburg State University
- 5: Intermodal Transportation Center - Montachusett Industrial Park - Central Plaza
- 6: Intermodal Transportation Center - Burbank Hospital
- 7: Intermodal Transportation Center - John Fitch - Lunenburg Crossing
- 8: Monument Square - Mall at Whitney Field - Orchard Hill Park
- 9: Monument Square - Jytek Industrial Park - Appleseed Plaza
- 10: Monument Square - Watertower Plaza - Leominster Hospital
- 11: Central Plaza - Montachusett Industrial Park - Waites Corner

=== Gardner ===
- 1: Mount Wachusett Community College - City Hall - WalMart Plaza - Dunn Pond
- 2: Mount Wachusett Community College - Gardner Plaza - WalMart Plaza - Henry Heywood Hospital

=== Intercity ===
- 1: MART Maintenance Facility (Gardner) - Intermodal Transportation Center (Fitchburg) - Routes 12 and 2/Friendly’s (Leominster) - City Hall (Gardner)

=== Trolley ===
- 1: Intermodal Transportation Center - Monument Park - Riverside Park - Wallace Plaza
- 2: Intermodal Transportation Center - Bellwood Plaza - Fitchburg State University/Ross Street Parking Lot - Upper Common/Church

== GLink fixed-route schedules ==
=== Athol ===
- 1 GLink: Gardner to Athol - Mount Wachusett CC (Main Entrance) - Templeton Center - Hannafords/Athol
- 2 GLink: Athol to Gardner - Hannafords/Athol - Uptown Common - Mount Wachusett CC (Main Entrance)

=== Winchendon ===
- 1 GLink: Gardner to Winchendon - City Hall Avenue/Connors Street - Baldwinville (Route 68 and 202) - Town Hall
- 2 GLink: Winchendon to Gardner - Winchendon Town Hall - Otter River - Fitchburg Intermodal Transportation Center

== Shuttle service schedules ==
=== Boston ===
- 1: Boston Service - Fitchburg ITC - Metro Boston/Major Hospitals - Concord/Emerson Hospital

=== Gardner/Wachusett ===
- 1: Gardner ITC - Gardner City Hall - Wachusett train station

=== Worcester ===
- 1: Worcester Service - Fitchburg ITC - UMass Medical - Reliant Gold Star Boulevard

== Gallery ==
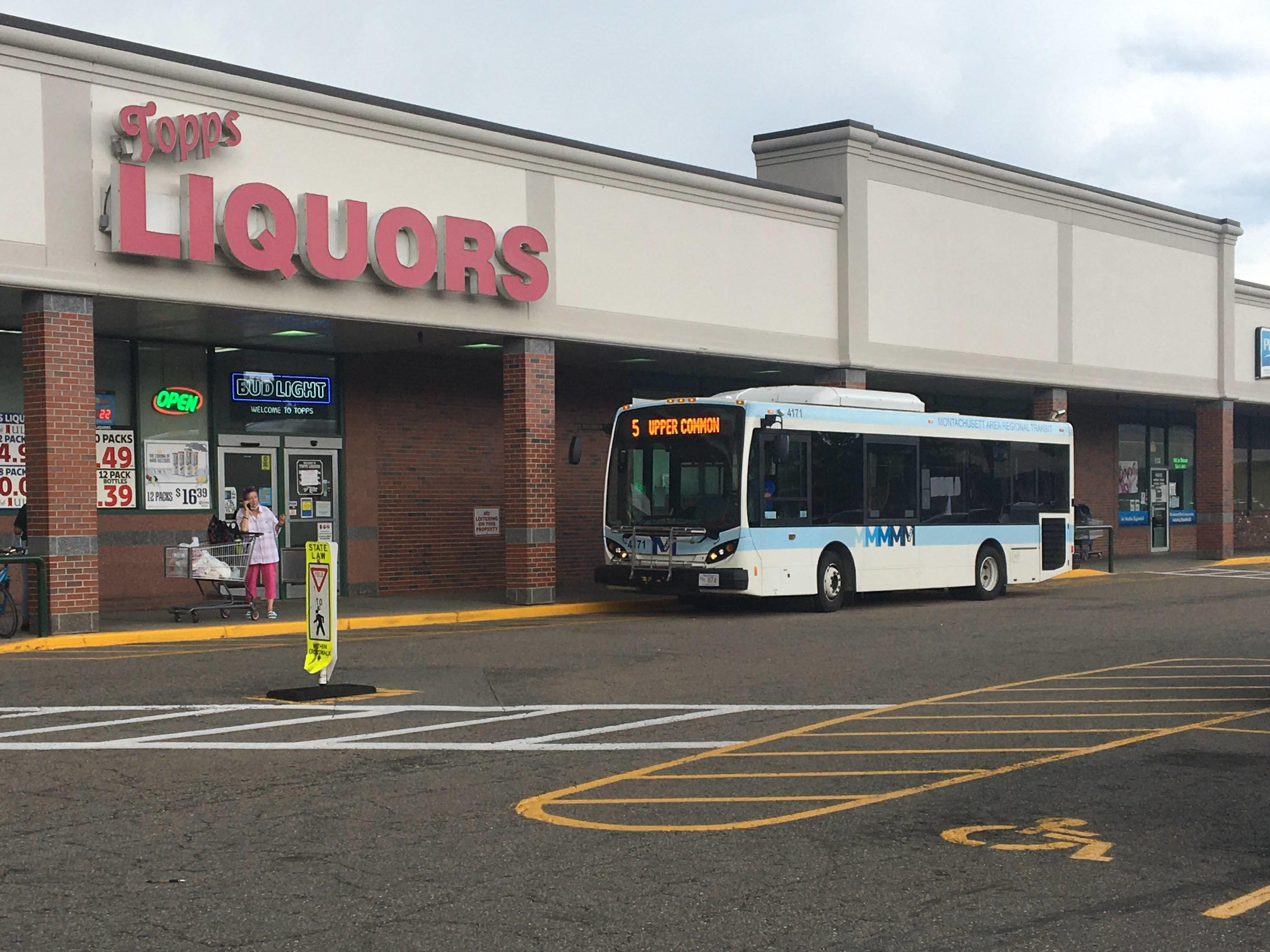
A route 5 bus in Fitchburg

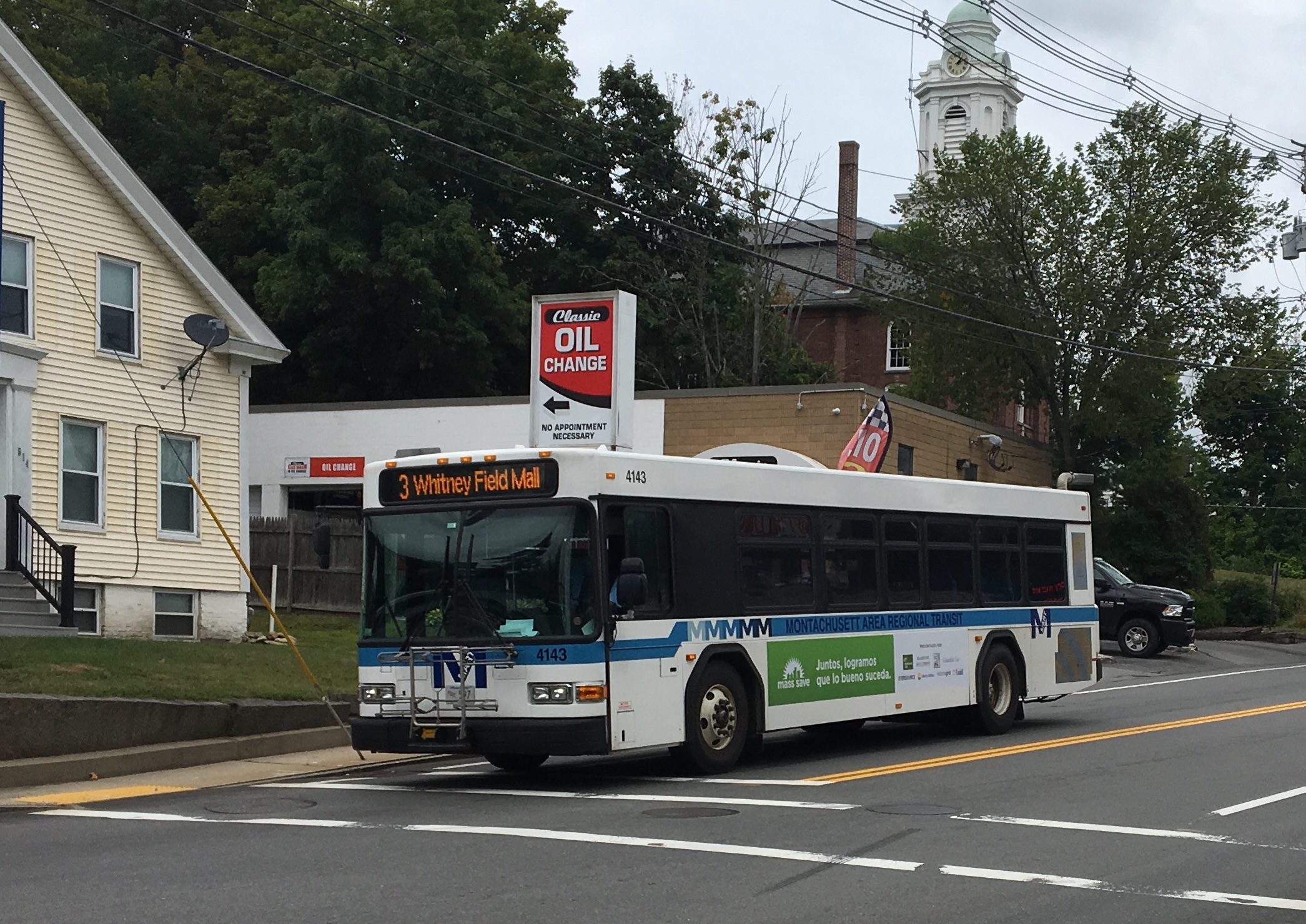
A route 3 bus in North Leominster

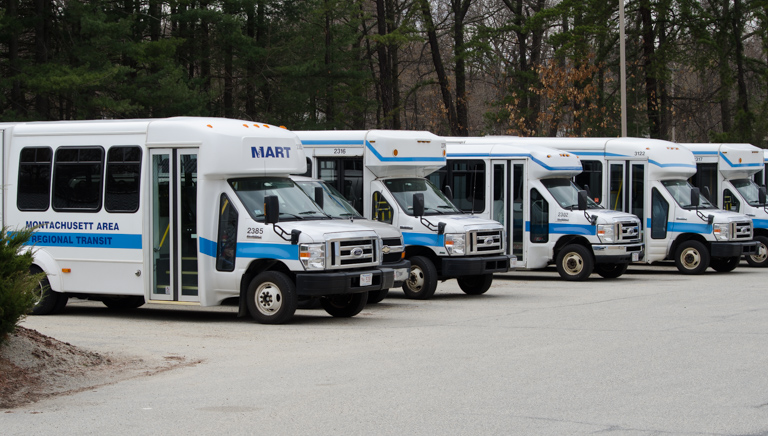
Shuttle vans at the MART headquarters in Fitchburg

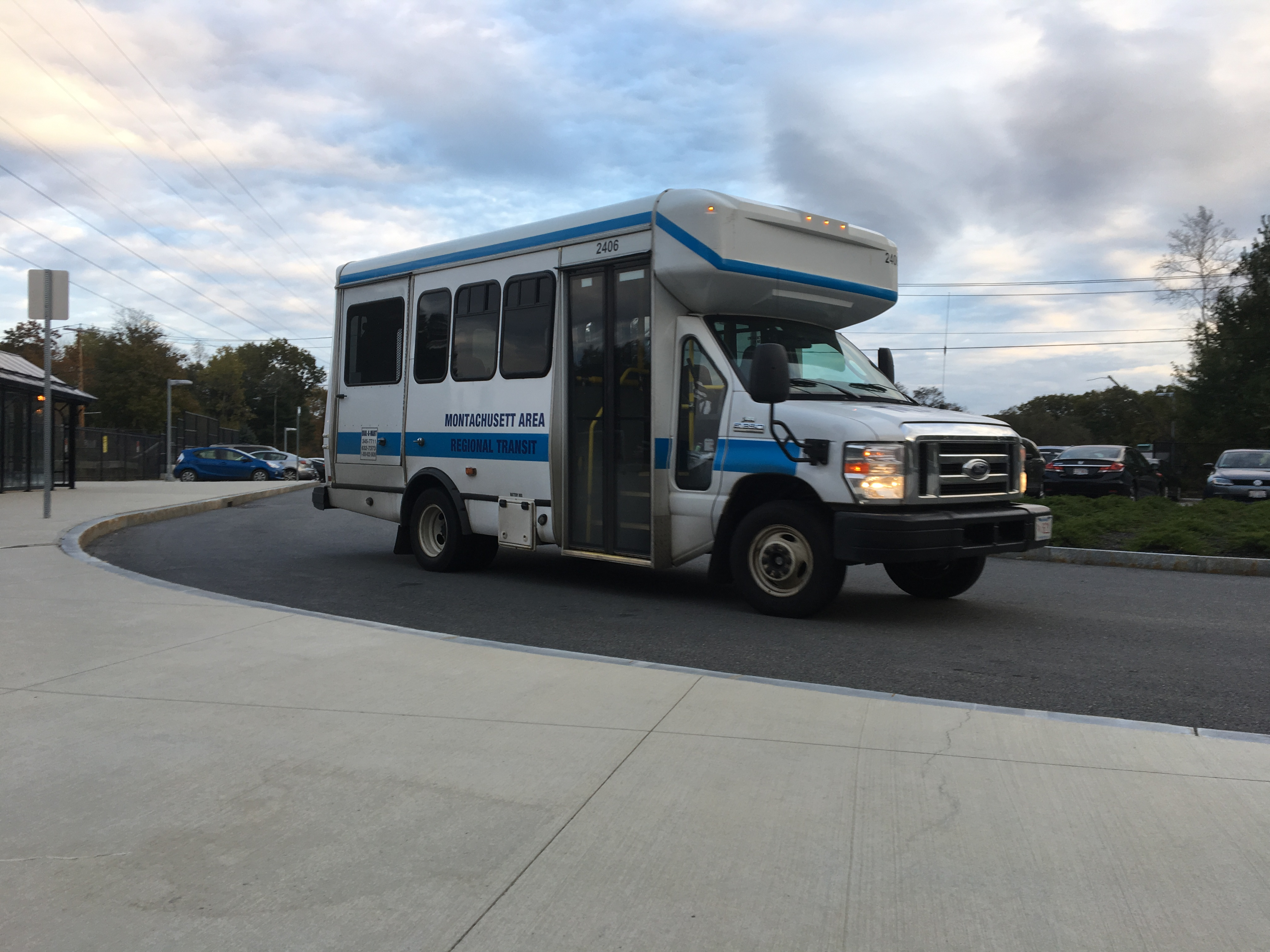
A Gardner Wachusett MBTA Shuttle van at Wachusett station

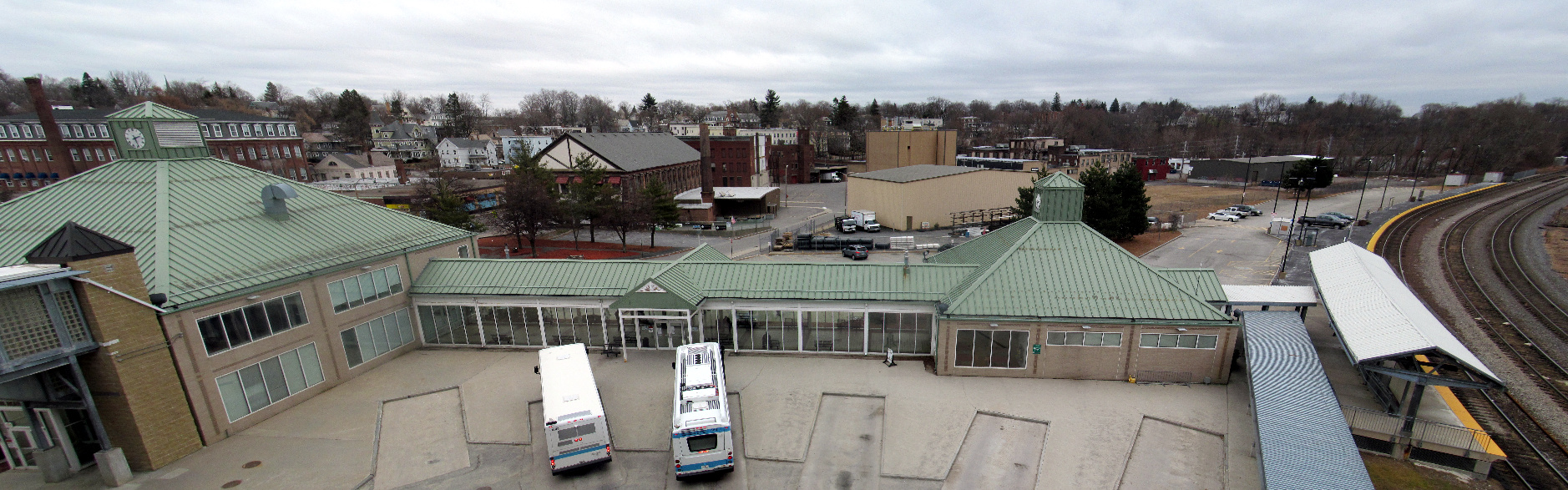
MART buses stopped at the Fitchburg Intermodal Transportation Center
