= Belmont Center station =

Train station in Belmont, Massachusetts, US

Belmont Center
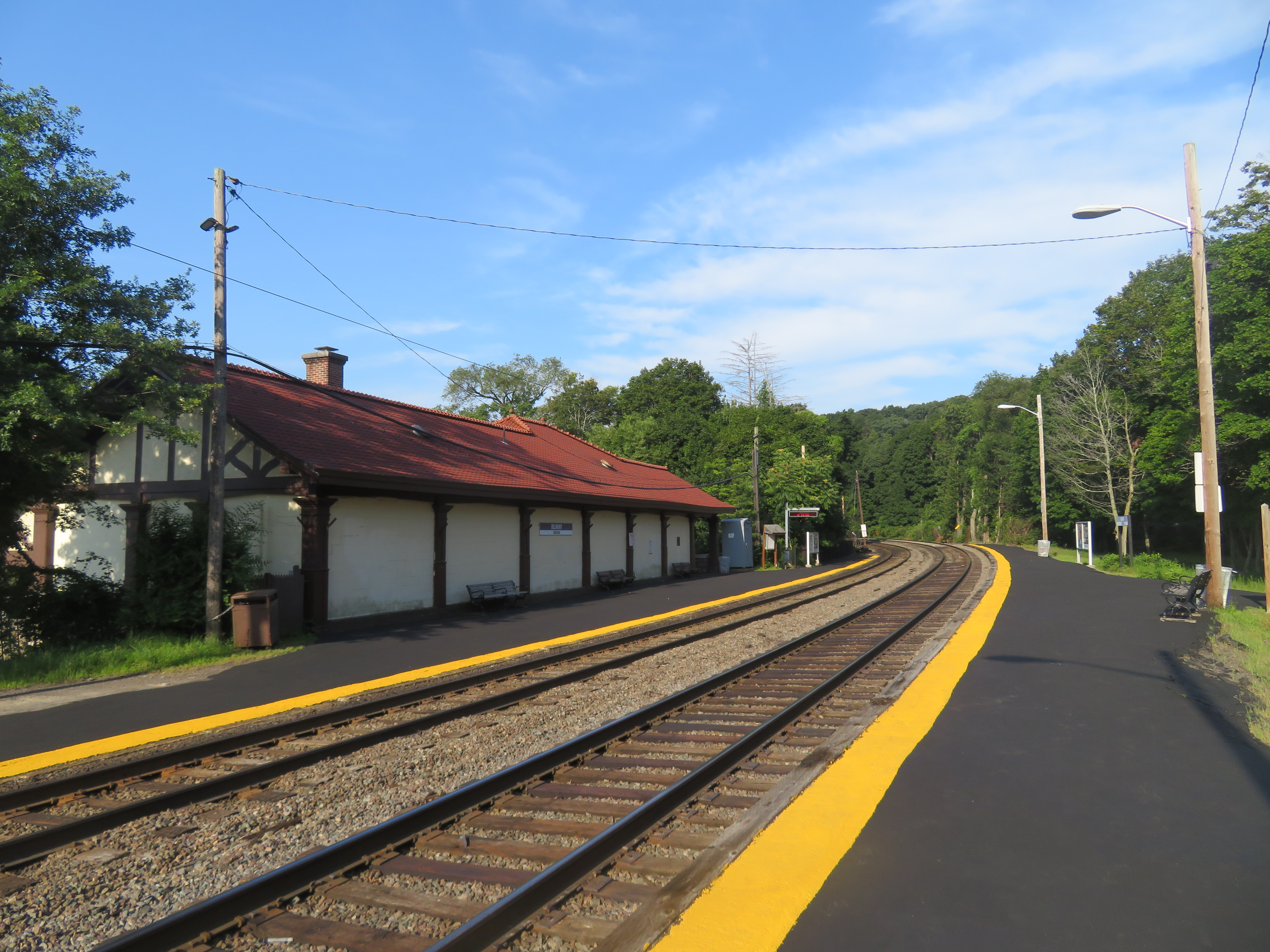
- Belmont Center station in July 2019

General information
- Location: Common Street at Concord Avenue; Belmont, Massachusetts
- Coordinates: 42°23′45.3″N 71°10′34.3″W
- Line: Fitchburg Route
- Platforms: 2 side platforms
- Tracks: 2
- Connections: MBTA bus: 74, 75

Construction
- Cycle facilities: 8 spaces
- Accessible: No

Other information
- Fare zone: 1

History
- Opened: 1852, March 4, 1974
- Closed: 1958
- Rebuilt: c. 1879, c. 1908

Passengers
- 2024: 163 daily boardings

Services
Preceding station	MBTA	Following station
Waverley toward Wachusett	Fitchburg Line	Porter toward North Station
Former services
Preceding station	Boston and Maine Railroad	Following station
Waverley toward Northampton	Central Mass Branch (closed 1952)	Hill Crossing toward Boston
- Belmont Railroad Station
- U.S. National Register of Historic Places
- Built: 1908
- Architectural style: Bungalow/Craftsman
- NRHP reference No.: 98001443
- Added to NRHP: December 4, 1998
Location

Belmont Center station is an MBTA Commuter Rail station in Belmont, Massachusetts, USA. It serves the Fitchburg Line. It is situated at the intersection of Common Street, Concord Avenue, and Leonard Street adjacent to Belmont's town center. It is one of two railroad stations located in Belmont, the other being Waverley station located in Waverley Square.

The modern station was built in 1908 after the completion of a grade separation project in which the railroad tracks were raised above grade. There are two low-level side platforms serving the line's two tracks on an elevated grade. The station has no high-level platforms or ramps and is therefore not accessible.

== History ==
=== Early days ===
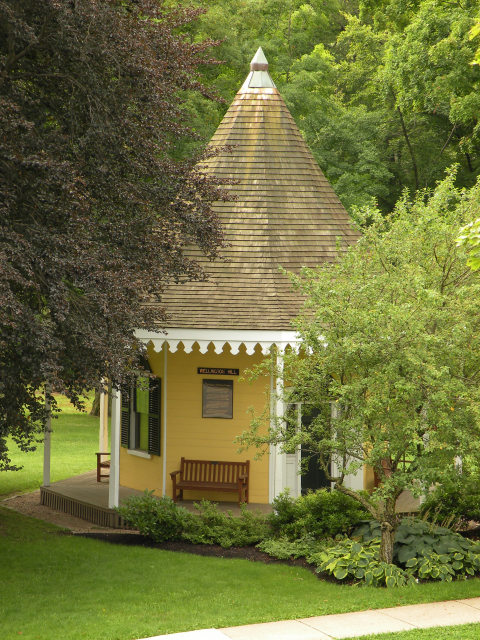
The former Wellington Hill station building, now at the Belmont Historical Society

Wellington Hill station opened in 1852, with a former school building built the previous decade moved to the site for a depot. A two-story wooden depot was built around 1879; the old station was moved and used as a summer house and an art studio at the Underwood Estate nearby. It was given to the Belmont Historical Society in 1975, and moved to its present location across the street from the modern station in 1980.

=== Track elevation ===
To eliminate the busy grade crossing of Concord Avenue, the tracks through Belmont Center were raised in 1907. A massive two-story California Bungalow station was built from 365 tons of fieldstone quarried from Belmont Hill by a local farmer. All service to Belmont Center and nearby Waverley ended in 1958.

=== MBTA era and accessibility ===
Service to Belmont Center and Waverley resumed on March 4, 1974. The Central Mass Branch had been discontinued in 1971, so all service was on the South Acton (now Fitchburg) Line. Weekend service was discontinued at the two stops on January 30, 1981 as part of general cutbacks, but restored on December 6, 1993. The 1908-built station building, which is now owned and occupied by the Belmont Lions Club, was added to the National Register of Historic Places on December 4, 1998.

The 2005 Fitchburg Commuter Rail Line Improvement Implementation Plan called for consolidating Waverley and Belmont stations into a single station between the locations. In 2015, the MBTA considered closing either Waverley or Belmont station due to the cost of making Waverley station accessible. Plans to rebuild Belmont Center at the existing site were dropped in January 2016.

In 2024, the MBTA tested a temporary freestanding accessible platform design at Beverly Depot. These platforms do not require alterations to the existing platforms, thus skirting federal rules requiring full accessibility renovations when stations are modified, and were intended to provide interim accessibility at lower cost pending full reconstruction. In May 2024, the agency identified Belmont Center as a possible future location for the platform design. As of May 2026, design work is underway; the accessible platforms at Belmont Center are expected to be completed in 2027.

== See also ==
- National Register of Historic Places listings in Middlesex County, Massachusetts
