= Fitchburg Intermodal Transportation Center =

Regional rail and bus station

Fitchburg
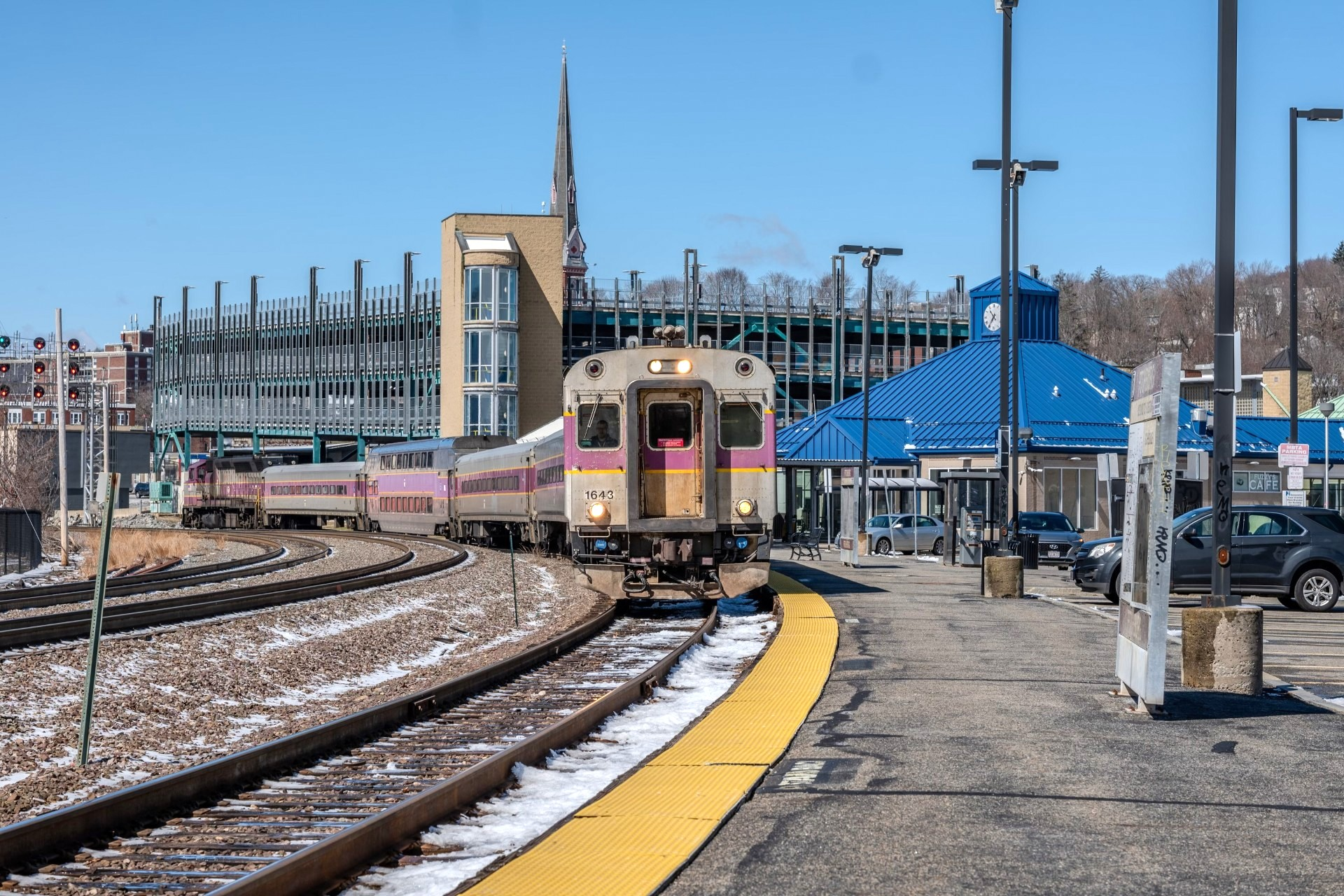
- An inbound train at Fitchburg station in March 2024

General information
- Location: 150 Main Street; Fitchburg, Massachusetts
- Coordinates: 42.5808°N 71.7926°W
- Line: Fitchburg Route
- Platforms: 1 side platform
- Tracks: 3
- Connections: MART: Worcester Commuter, Intercity/MWCC, Fitchburg–Leominster Route 2 Express, Wachusett Commuter Shuttle, 1, 2, 3, 4, 5, 6, 7, 11

Construction
- Parking: 400 spaces ($3.00 fee)
- Cycle facilities: 20 spaces
- Accessible: Yes

Other information
- Fare zone: 8

History
- Opened: January 13, 1980
- Rebuilt: May 15, 2000

Passengers
- 2024: 250 daily boardings

Services
Preceding station	MBTA	Following station
Wachusett Terminus	Fitchburg Line	North Leominster toward North Station
Former services
Preceding station	Boston and Maine Railroad	Following station
Terminus	Boston – Fitchburg	North Leominster toward Boston
West Fitchburg toward Troy	Boston – Troy	North Leominster toward Boston
Keene toward Montreal	Green Mountain Flyer / Mount Royal	Boston Terminus
Preceding station	New York, New Haven and Hartford Railroad	Following station
Terminus	Agricultural Branch	South Fitchburg toward Framingham
Terminus	Worcester–Fitchburg	South Fitchburg toward Worcester
Preceding station	MBTA	Following station
Gardner Terminus	Fitchburg Line	North Leominster toward North Station
Location

The Fitchburg Intermodal Transportation Center is a regional rail and bus station located in downtown Fitchburg, Massachusetts. It is a stop on the MBTA Commuter Rail Fitchburg Line and a hub for Montachusett Regional Transit Authority local and intercity bus routes.

== History ==
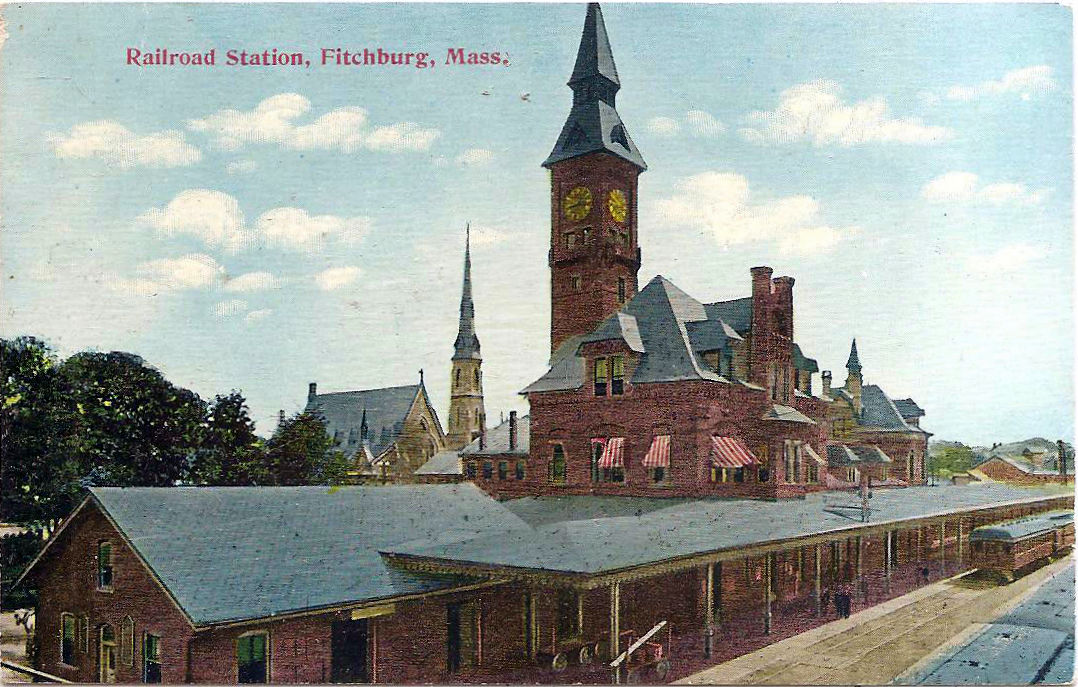
An early-20th-century postcard of Fitchburg Union Station

The Fitchburg Railroad was completed westward to Fitchburg on March 5, 1845. The Vermont and Massachusetts Railroad (V&M) soon extended the line west of Fitchburg, reaching Baldwinville in September 1847 and Greenfield on January 20, 1850. The Cheshire Railroad opened in stages from South Ashburnham beginning in 1847; Fitchburg was the first major station to the east of the junction. The Fitchburg and Worcester Railroad (F&W) opened in 1850, giving Fitchburg connections to Framingham and Worcester.

Schedules allowed commuting from Fitchburg starting in 1864; after 1880, it was the outer terminal of commuter service on the line. Fitchburg Union Station, a brick structure with a five-story clock tower, was constructed in 1877. By 1900, the Boston and Maine Railroad (B&M) had acquired the Fitchburg, the V&M, and the Cheshire; the New Haven Railroad owned the F&W. Fitchburg was a major station for B&M intercity trains - including the Green Mountain Flyer and Mount Royal on the Cheshire Branch, and Minuteman on the Boston–Troy mainline. A short branch line ran from the station to the Cushing Flour and Grain mill on Cushing Street. It was electrified in 1890 using the first US-built electric locomotive and was used until 1947.

Fitchburg–Worcester passenger service ended around 1926, followed by Fitchburg–Framingham service in 1931, though the line remained in use by freight. B&M passenger service on the Fitchburg Route was never as heavy as the other three mainlines, and it mostly escaped significant cuts until the 1950s. Cheshire Branch service was cut back to Fitchburg on May 18, 1958, as part of major service cuts that day. All service west of Fitchburg ended on April 23, 1960. No longer needed, Union Station was demolished in 1962 and replaced by a small brick building.

=== MBTA era ===
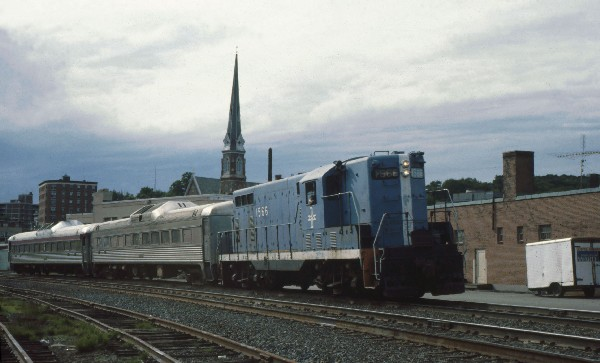
An MBTA train at Fitchburg in 1980

The newly formed MBTA began subsidizing B&M commuter service on January 18, 1965. The Fitchburg Line was cut back to West Concord - the outer limit of the MBTA funding district. Fitchburg reopened on January 13, 1980 as part of an extension of the line from South Acton to Gardner. Fitchburg was the outer terminus of Fitchburg Line service from the closure of Gardner in early 1987 to the opening of Wachusett station in September 2016.

The still-extant 1980 station - a short stretch of bare asphalt with a bus shelter - was replaced by the Fitchburg Intermodal Transportation Center on May 15, 2000. The new facility added a handicapped-accessible platform, waiting rooms, bus bays, and a larger parking lot. In June 2005, most of the surface parking was replaced with a 400-space parking garage.
