= Concord station (Massachusetts) =

Railroad station in Concord, Massachusetts

Concord
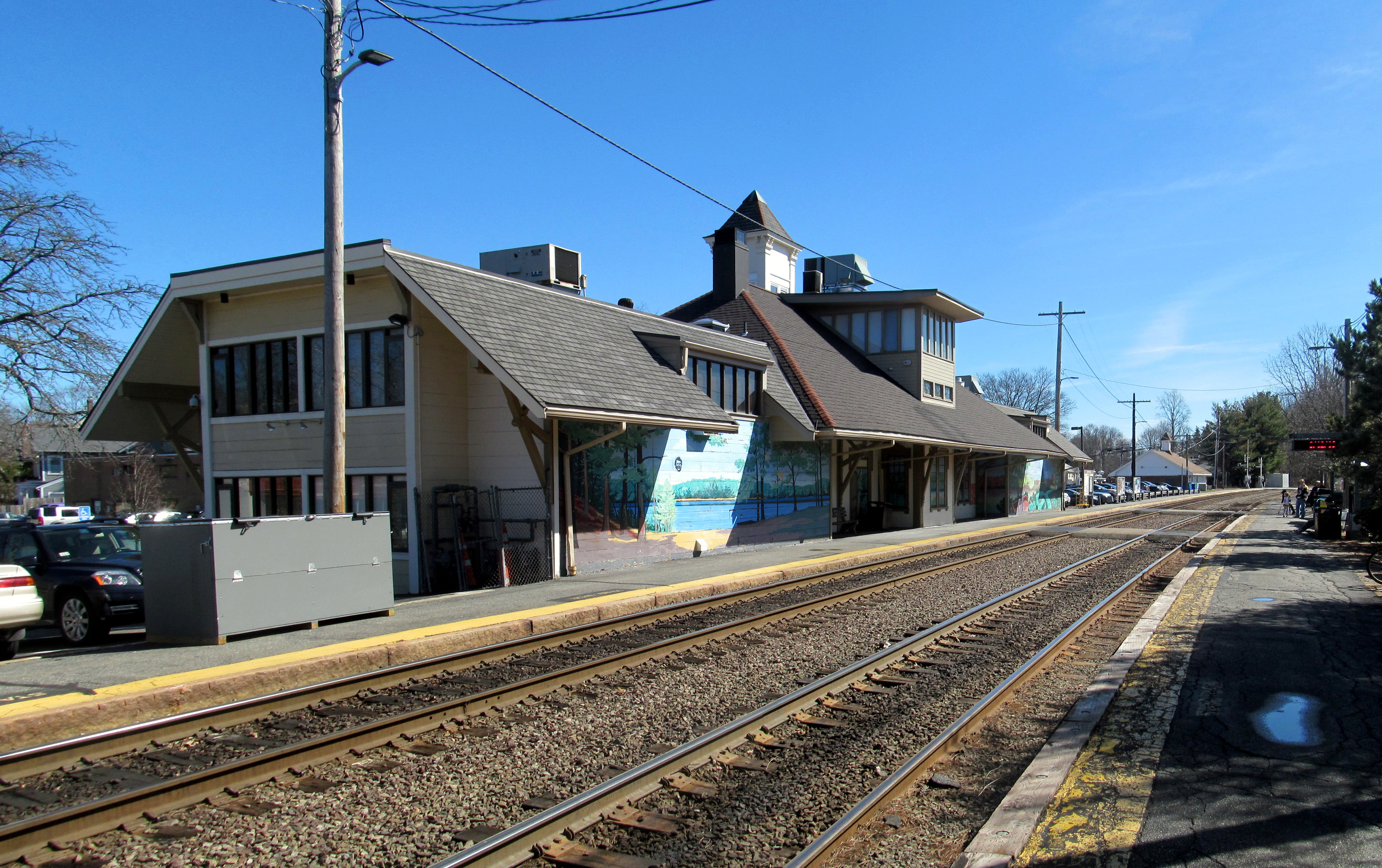
- Concord station in March 2016

General information
- Location: 90 Thoreau Street; Concord, Massachusetts
- Coordinates: 42°27′24″N 71°21′28″W
- Owner: Town of Concord
- Line: Fitchburg Route
- Platforms: 2 side platforms
- Tracks: 2

Construction
- Parking: 86 spaces (free)
- Cycle facilities: 10 spaces

Other information
- Fare zone: 5

Passengers
- 2024: 287 daily boardings

Services
Preceding station	MBTA	Following station
West Concord toward Wachusett	Fitchburg Line	Lincoln toward North Station
Location

Concord station is a commuter rail station on the MBTA Commuter Rail Fitchburg Line located in downtown Concord, Massachusetts. It has two side platforms, which are low-level and not accessible, serving the line's two tracks.

== History ==
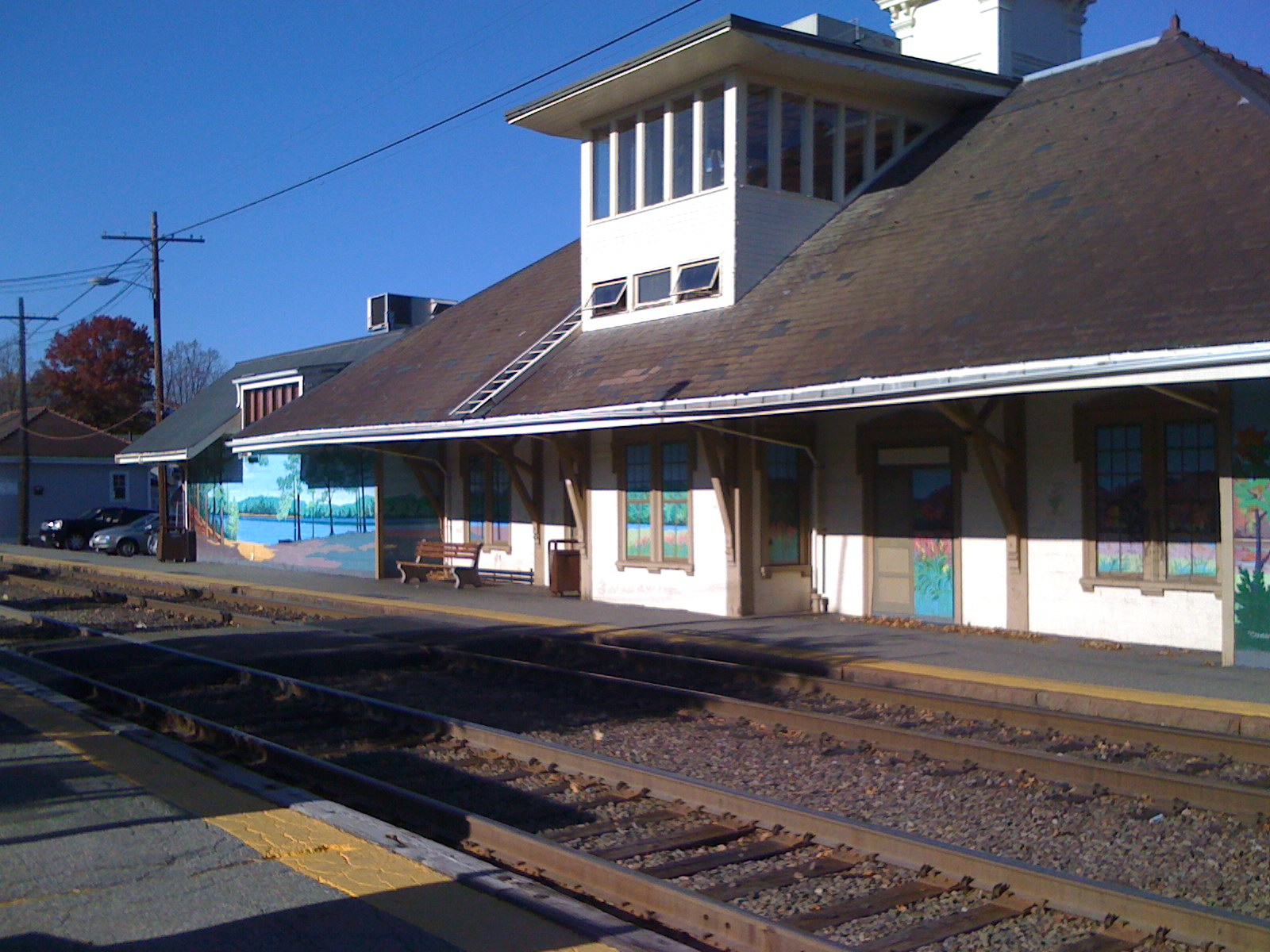
The original trackside windows and doors have been boarded up and replaced with painted-on copies. The structure on the roof was formerly a control tower.

Fitchburg Railroad service from Concord to Boston began in June 1844, and has continued since. When he lived at Walden Pond, Henry David Thoreau complained that the village's schedule was set by the times of arrivals and departures at the station. Although the Fitchburg Line went through a series of contractions due to funding issues in the 1960s and 1970s, service to Concord was never interrupted.

A new station was completed in January 1875. The current station building was built in the Queen Anne style in the 1890s. The new station was damaged by fire in 1895 and substantially rebuilt. When built, it was a squat hip-roofed station similar to other stations on the line. A control tower on the trackside roof was added later.

In 1958, the station building was purchased from the B&M at a cost of $35,000 (equivalent to $391,000 in 2025). It was converted for use as a gift shop by 1962. By 1977, it was subdivided for use as offices, a restaurant, and retail space.

The depot was later modified during the 20th century and scarcely resembles the original. The trackside doors and windows have been boarded over, replaced by a mural painted in the early 1980s. Large side wings have been added, and the building converted for retail use. The circa-1907 express office is present just to the west and also in retail use; a freight house east of the station was demolished in 1991.

In 2024, the MBTA tested a temporary freestanding accessible platform design at Beverly Depot. These platforms do not require alterations to the existing platforms, thus skirting federal rules requiring full accessibility renovations when stations are modified, and were intended to provide interim accessibility at lower cost pending full reconstruction. Concord is planned to be part of the second set of non-accessible stations to be modified with the temporary platforms. Funding for design and construction came from Fair Share Amendment revenues. Design work began in the first half of 2024. As of May 2026, design work is still underway; the accessible platforms at Concord are expected to be completed in 2027.
