= Troy and Boston Railroad =

Map

The Troy and Boston Railroad was chartered April 4, 1848 and organized November 22, 1849. It completed a railroad from Troy, New York to the Vermont state line (35 miles) in 1852. This was also the main track of the Troy and Rutland Railroad, Rutland and Washington Railroad, and the Rutland Railway. This formed, in connection with the Hudson River Railroad, the most direct and shortest line from New York to Montreal. It was consolidated into the Fitchburg Railroad in 1887, which was in turn acquired by Boston and Maine Railroad by lease in 1900.
