= South Ashburnham, Massachusetts =

- CDP
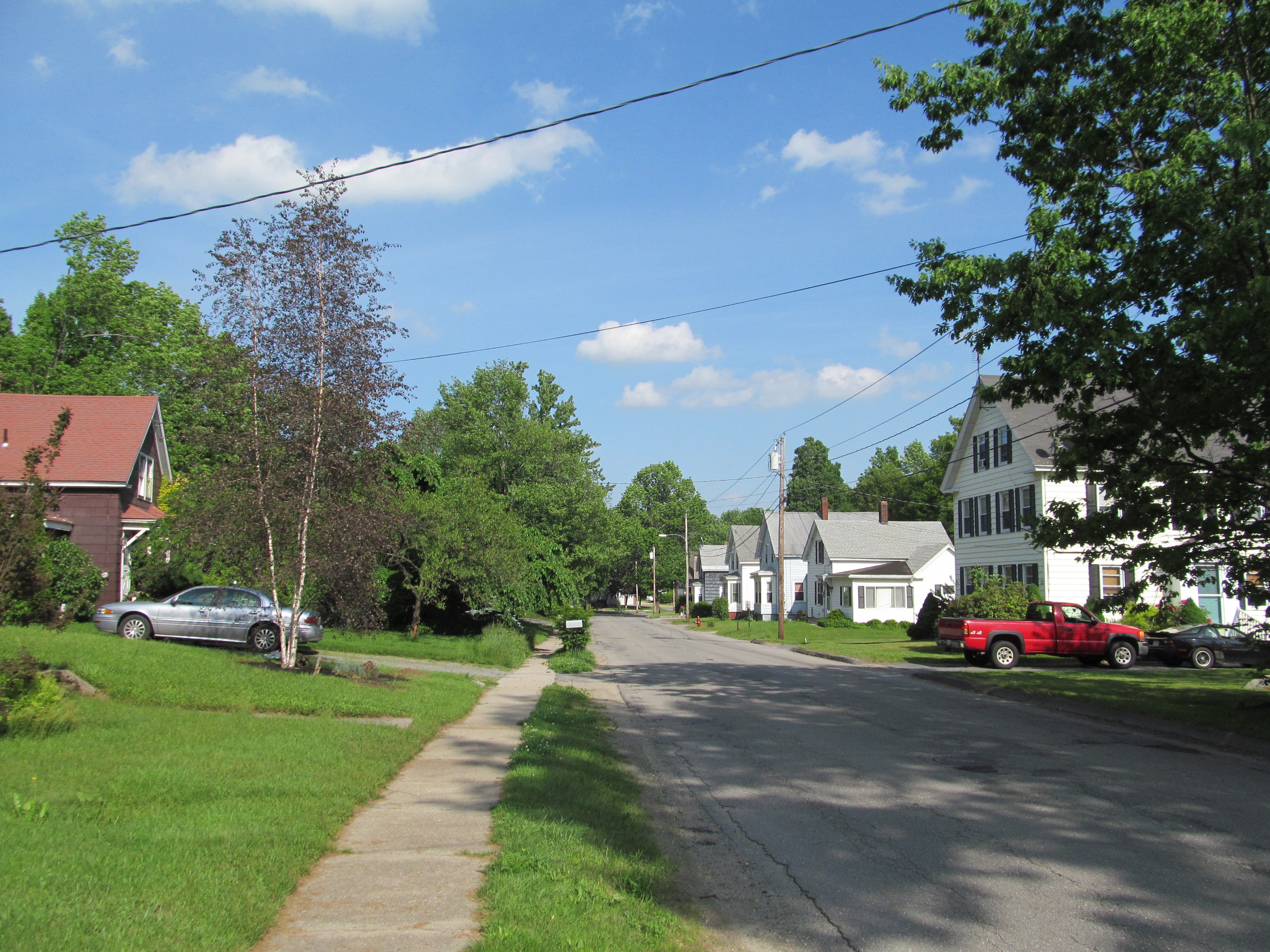
- South Main Street

- Location in Worcester County and the state of Massachusetts.
- Coordinates: 42°36′50″N 71°55′53″W
- Country: United States
- State: Massachusetts
- County: Worcester

Area
  - Total: 3.00 sq mi (7.76 km^{2})
  - Land: 2.98 sq mi (7.73 km^{2})
  - Water: 0.012 sq mi (0.03 km^{2})
- Elevation: 965 ft (294 m)

Population (2020)
  - Total: 1,136
  - Density: 380.7/sq mi (146.98/km^{2})
- Time zone: UTC-5 (Eastern (EST))
  - Summer (DST): UTC-4 (EDT)
- ZIP Code: 01430 (Ashburnham)
- Area code: 978
- FIPS code: 25-62780
- GNIS feature ID: 0610144

South Ashburnham is a census-designated place (CDP) in the town of Ashburnham in Worcester County, Massachusetts, United States. As of the 2020 census, South Ashburnham had a population of 1,136.

== Geography ==
South Ashburnham is located at 42°36′50″N 71°55′53″W (42.613856, -71.931517).

According to the United States Census Bureau, the CDP has a total area of 7.8 km^{2} (3.0 mi^{2}), of which 7.8 km^{2} (3.0 mi^{2}) is land and 0.33% is water.

== Demographics ==
Historical population
Census	Pop.	Note	%±
2020	1,136		—
U.S. Decennial Census

At the 2000 census there were 1,013 people, 365 households, and 286 families living in the CDP. The population density was 129.9/km^{2} (336.3/mi^{2}). It were 373 housing units at an average density of 47.8/km^{2} (123.8/mi^{2}). The racial makeup of the CDP was 96.84% White, 0.79% African American, 0.30% Asian, 0.39% from other races, and 1.68% from two or more races. Hispanic or Latino of any race were 2.76%. 24.5% were of French, 17.2% Irish, 13.3% French Canadian, 6.0% Finnish, 5.7% Swedish and 5.6% English ancestry according to Census 2000.

Of the 365 households 37.5% had children under the age of 18 living with them, 60.5% were married couples living together, 12.9% had a female householder with no husband present, and 21.6% were non-families. 17.8% of households were one person and 8.8% were one person aged 65 or older. The average household size was 2.78 and the average family size was 3.13.

The age distribution was 26.8% under the age of 18, 7.3% from 18 to 24, 32.0% from 25 to 44, 24.6% from 45 to 64, and 9.4% 65 or older. The median age was 38 years. For every 100 females, there were 96.7 males. For every 100 females age 18 and over, there were 95.8 males.

The median household income was $50,121 and the median family income was $52,258. Males had a median income of $35,139 versus $31,250 for females. The per capita income for the CDP was $18,324. About 8.3% of families and 10.6% of the population were below the poverty line, including 10.9% of those under age 18 and 27.4% of those age 65 or over.

== Climate ==
In a typical year, South Ashburnham, Massachusetts temperatures fall below 50 °F (10 °C) for 195 days per year. Annual precipitation is typically 44.8 inches per year (high in the US) and snow covers the ground 68 days per year, or 18.6% of the year (high in the US). It may be helpful to understand the yearly precipitation by imagining nine straight days of moderate rain per year. The humidity is below 60% for approximately 25.4 days, or 7.0% of the year.
