= Wachusett station =

Railway station in Fitchburg, Massachusetts, US

Wachusett
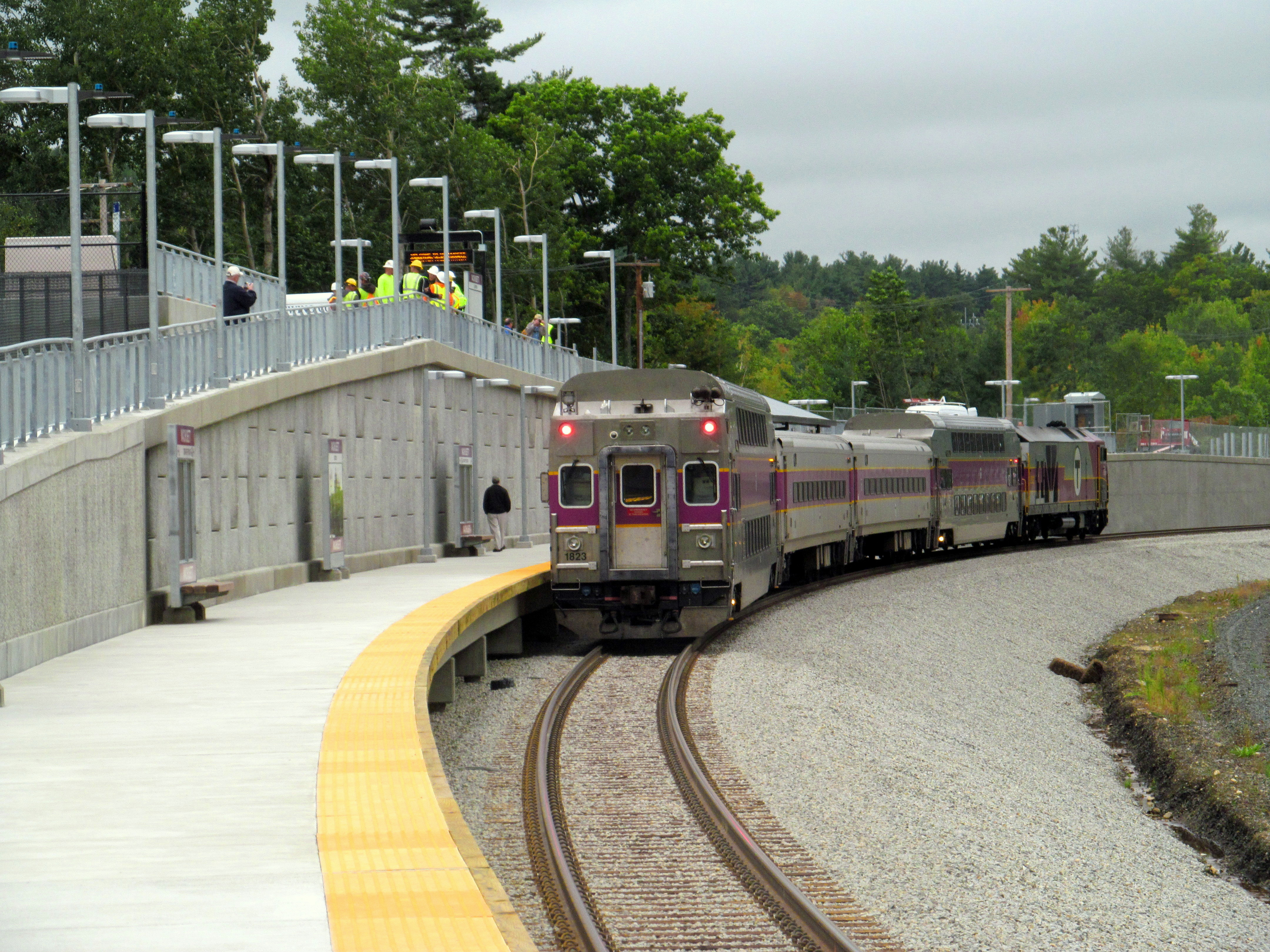
- The first revenue train at Wachusett station in September 2016

General information
- Location: 55 Authority Drive; Fitchburg, Massachusetts, US
- Coordinates: 42.5534°N 71.8477°W
- Line: Pan Am Southern Freight Main Line
- Platforms: 1 side platform
- Tracks: 3 (2 mainline plus 1 station siding)
- Connections: MART: Wachusett Commuter Shuttle, 11; Wachusett Mountain shuttle (winter)

Construction
- Parking: 359 spaces ($3.00 fee)
- Cycle facilities: 10 spaces
- Accessible: Yes

Other information
- Fare zone: 8

History
- Opened: September 30, 2016

Passengers
- 2024: 83 daily boardings

Services
Preceding station	MBTA	Following station
Terminus	Fitchburg Line	Fitchburg toward North Station
Former services
Preceding station	Boston and Maine Railroad	Following station
South Ashburnham toward Troy	Boston – Troy	Fitchburg toward Boston
Location

Wachusett station is a commuter rail station on MBTA Commuter Rail's Fitchburg Line. It is northwest of the intersection of Massachusetts Route 2 and Route 31 in Fitchburg, Massachusetts, United States. It serves as the northwestern terminus for Fitchburg Line trains. The opening of Wachusett extended service 4.5 miles (7.2 km) west from Fitchburg on the Pan Am Southern main line, lengthening the Fitchburg Line to 54 miles (87 km). The station was expected to draw 400 daily riders; by 2018, daily ridership was 132.

After years of planning and discussion, work on the station began with site preparation in December 2012. Construction began in mid-2013. The station opened for limited weekday service on September 30, 2016, to satisfy the terms of the federal grant that funded it; full service began on November 21, 2016. At 54 miles (87 km) from North Station, Wachusett was the furthest MBTA Commuter Rail station in Massachusetts until the South Coast Rail project opened in 2025.

== History ==
=== Former service ===
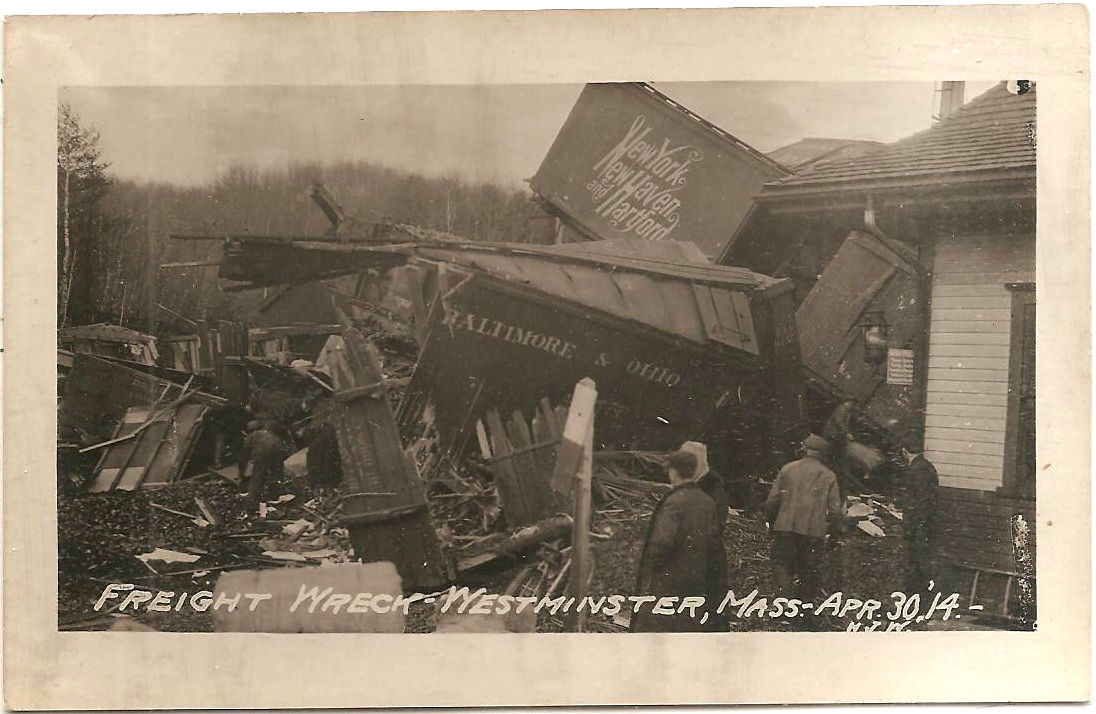
Freight wreck at Westminster station in 1914

The first portion of the Vermont and Massachusetts Railroad opened on September 1, 1847 as an extension of the Fitchburg Railroad. Two stations were located near the modern Wachusett site:

Westminster station, serving Westminster, Massachusetts, was located on Bartherick Road off State Road (Route 2A), about 1.4 miles (2.3 km) west of the modern station site. It was among the original stations opened with the railroad. The station building burned in 1908. In April 1914, 17 cars of an eastbound freight derailed and damaged the replacement station building.

Wachusett station was located south of Princeton Road (Route 31) in the Crockerville section of Fitchburg, Massachusetts, about 0.3 miles (0.48 km) northeast of the modern station. It opened by 1865. A freight wreck at the station in July 1905 killed two men.

The Boston and Maine Railroad (B&M) acquired the Fitchburg Railroad in 1900. Westminster station closed between 1917 and 1929; Wachusett was served only by a single westbound train by 1929, and was closed between 1942 and 1946. All passenger service west of Fitchburg was terminated by the B&M in 1960. MBTA Commuter Rail service was extended west from Fitchburg to Gardner in January 1980 with no intermediate stations. A possible infill station in Westminster was included in a 1981 fare tariff. Service was cut back to Fitchburg at the end of 1986. The derelict Wachusett freight depot, located just south of the station, was demolished in 2005 or 2006.

=== Planning for restoration ===
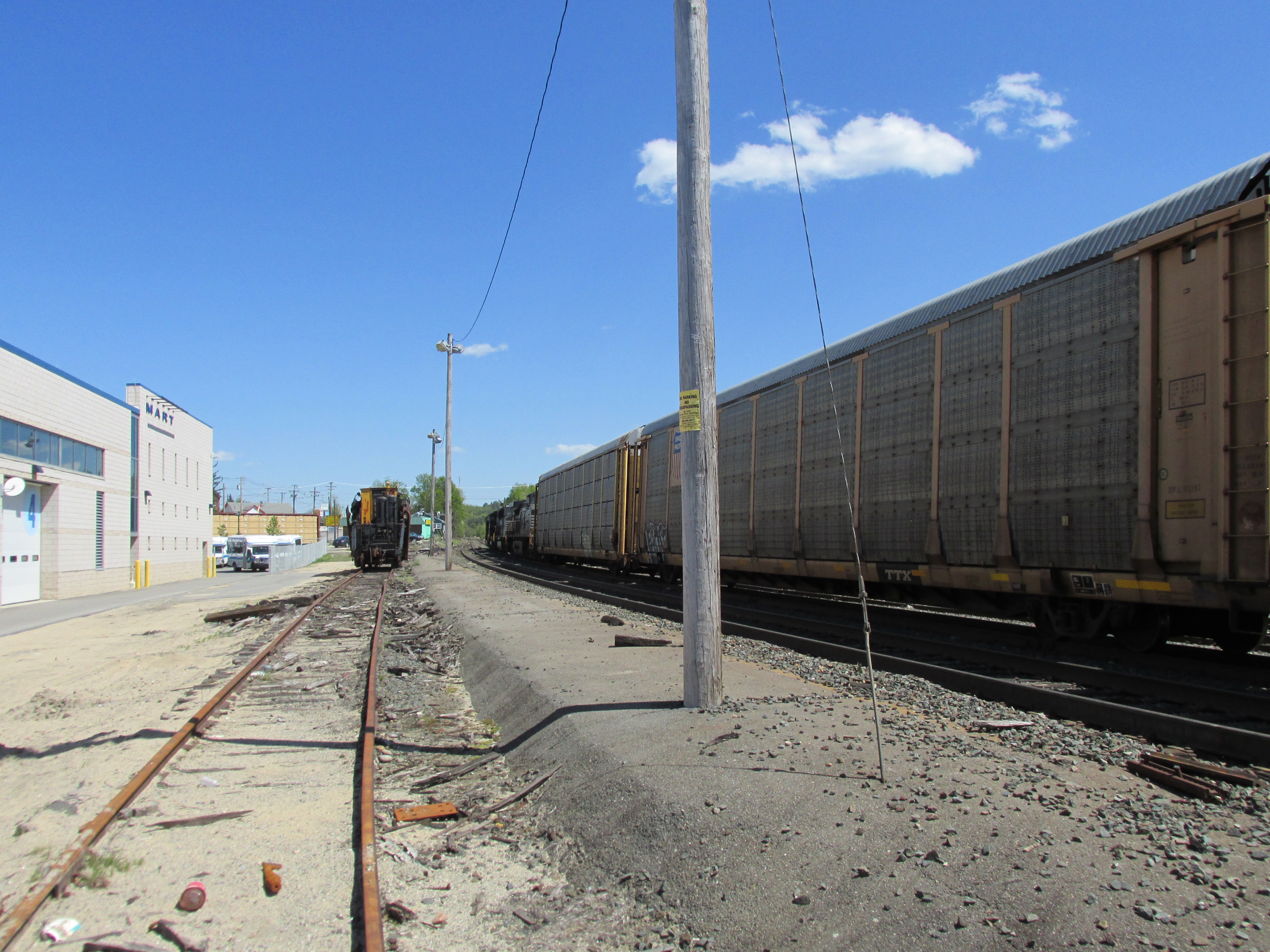
Restoring service to this station in Gardner, which had previously run from 1980 to 1986, was considered but rejected in favor of a shorter extension to Wachusett

Restoring commuter rail service past Fitchburg has been considered since 1987. In 2000, the Massachusetts State Legislature passed a bill that directed the MBTA to "conduct a feasibility study regarding the reestablishment of the commuter rail line to the cities of Gardner and Athol on the existing Fitchburg/Gardner/Athol spur line" as one of many expansion and improvement projects.

However, restoration of service all the way to Gardner, much less Athol, was deemed impractical for several reasons. Gardner is 64 miles (103 km) and Athol 81 miles (130 km) by rail for North Station – outside normal commuting distances. The line between Fitchburg and Gardner would cost $104.2 million to double track, and speeds are limited due to the grades going through the Wachusett Mountain range. Because the Route 2 expressway is faster along the corridor than rail service would be, the station at Gardner would have attracted just 50 riders per day. The Fitchburg Commuter Rail Line Service Expansion Study was released in February 2005; it recommended a shorter interim extension to a new park-and-ride station off Route 2 in West Fitchburg, with possible extension to Gardner later.

=== Funding and design ===
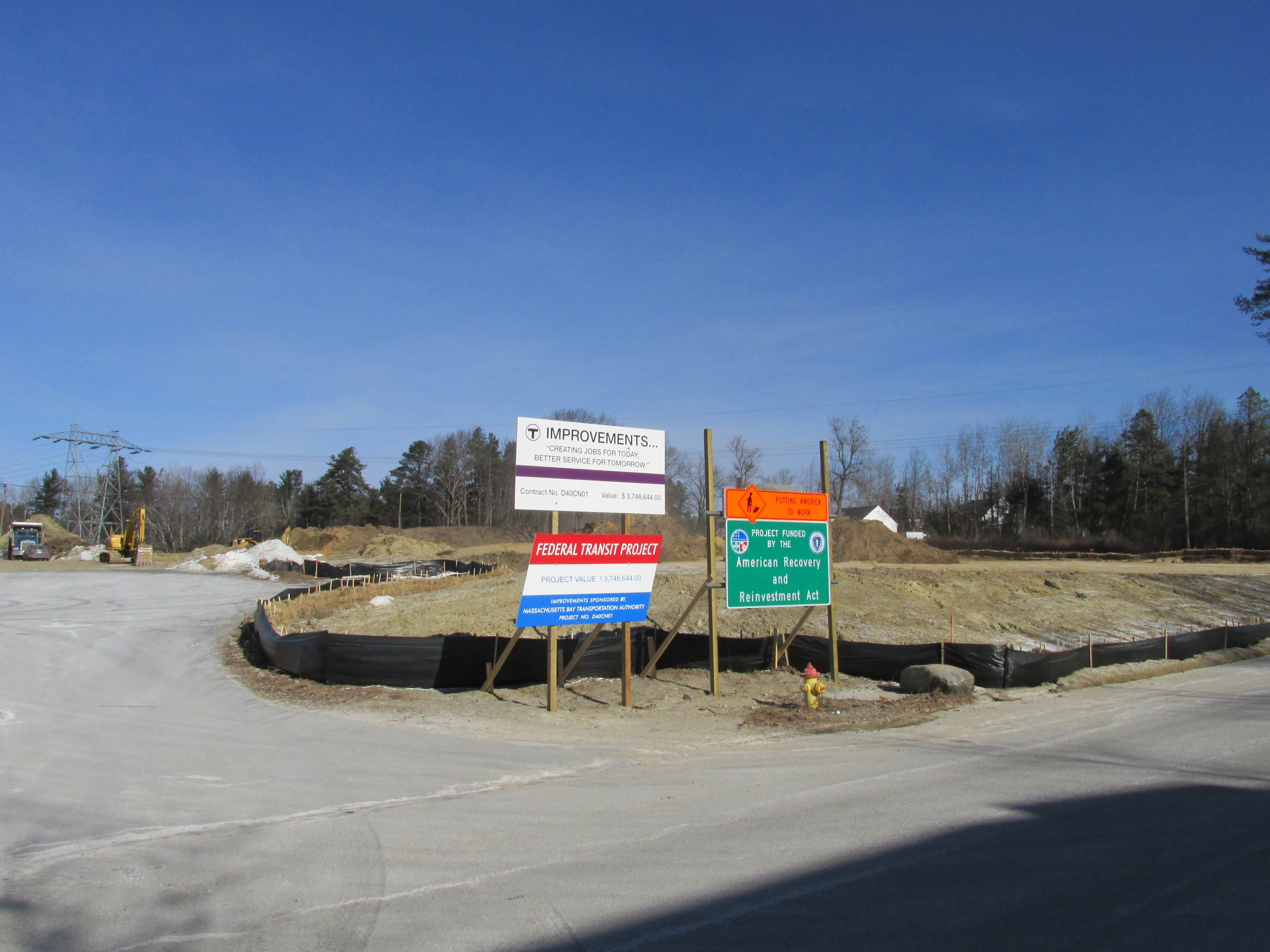
Entrance to the station construction site in January 2013. Signs noting the contributions of the Federal Transit Administration (part of US DOT) are displayed.

On February 17, 2010, the US Department of Transportation awarded a $55.5M TIGER grant for the station in West Fitchburg and a new layover facility in the town of Westminster. In June 2010, the MBTA and Pan Am Railways reached an agreement for trackage rights and fees on several lines, including MBTA access to Wachusett station and the layover on the Pan Am Southern mainline partially owned by Pan Am Railways. The project officially began with a publicized groundbreaking on October 18, 2010, and was originally scheduled to be completed by the first quarter of 2012. However, by February 2012, the station was just at 30% design phase, with track and signals to reach 30% design by late spring. As of then, the estimated completion date was October 2013.

The new station includes a single gently curving, high-level side platform 800 feet (240 m) long, located on a siding that allows trains to pull fully clear of the more-curved Pan Am Southern mainline. The station has a parking lot with 359 spaces as well as a Montachusett Regional Transit Authority (MART) bus dropoff area and a kiss-and-ride area.

On March 16, 2012, a kickoff event was held for a "smart growth corridor" consisting of 12,500 acres (5,100 ha) acres within a 2.5-mile (4.0 km) bikeable radius of the station. In October 2012, $3.6 million in federal funds was given to the now-$63 million project to cover a budget shortfall due to design and site issues. The station was then expected to be completed by the end of 2013 and to open in Spring 2014.

==== Layover yard controversy ====
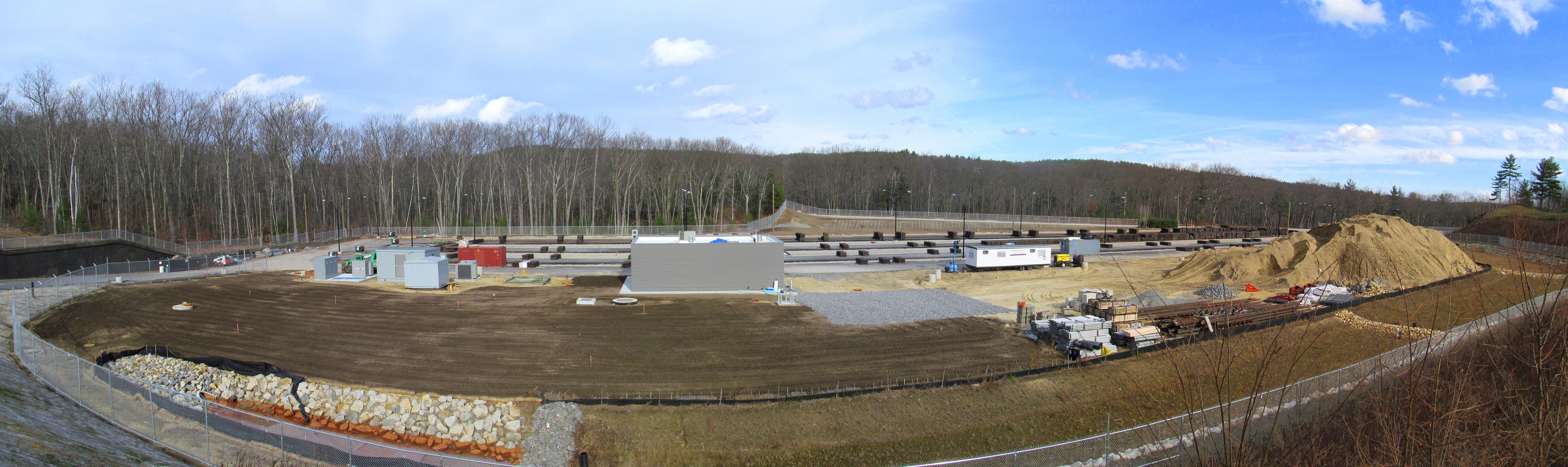
Wachusett Layover under construction in November 2015

Although the station itself was not the subject of significant controversy, the proposed layover facility 1.5 miles (2.4 km) to the west met with community opposition in Westminster over noise pollution effects. The layover, with six 1,000-foot (300 m) tracks, replaced a similar, smaller yard in East Fitchburg. Work on the layover began in late 2012; on December 28, 2012, the town issued a stop work order over allegations that the MBTA had not obtained the proper permits. In March 2013, the town filed a complaint to the Inspector General of the US Department of Transportation, alleging that delays in the project were a result of the MBTA misleading town officials rather than ordinary construction delays, and asking the DOT to stop work on the project pending an investigation. By early 2014, the MBTA proceeded with construction of the layover yard.

=== Construction ===
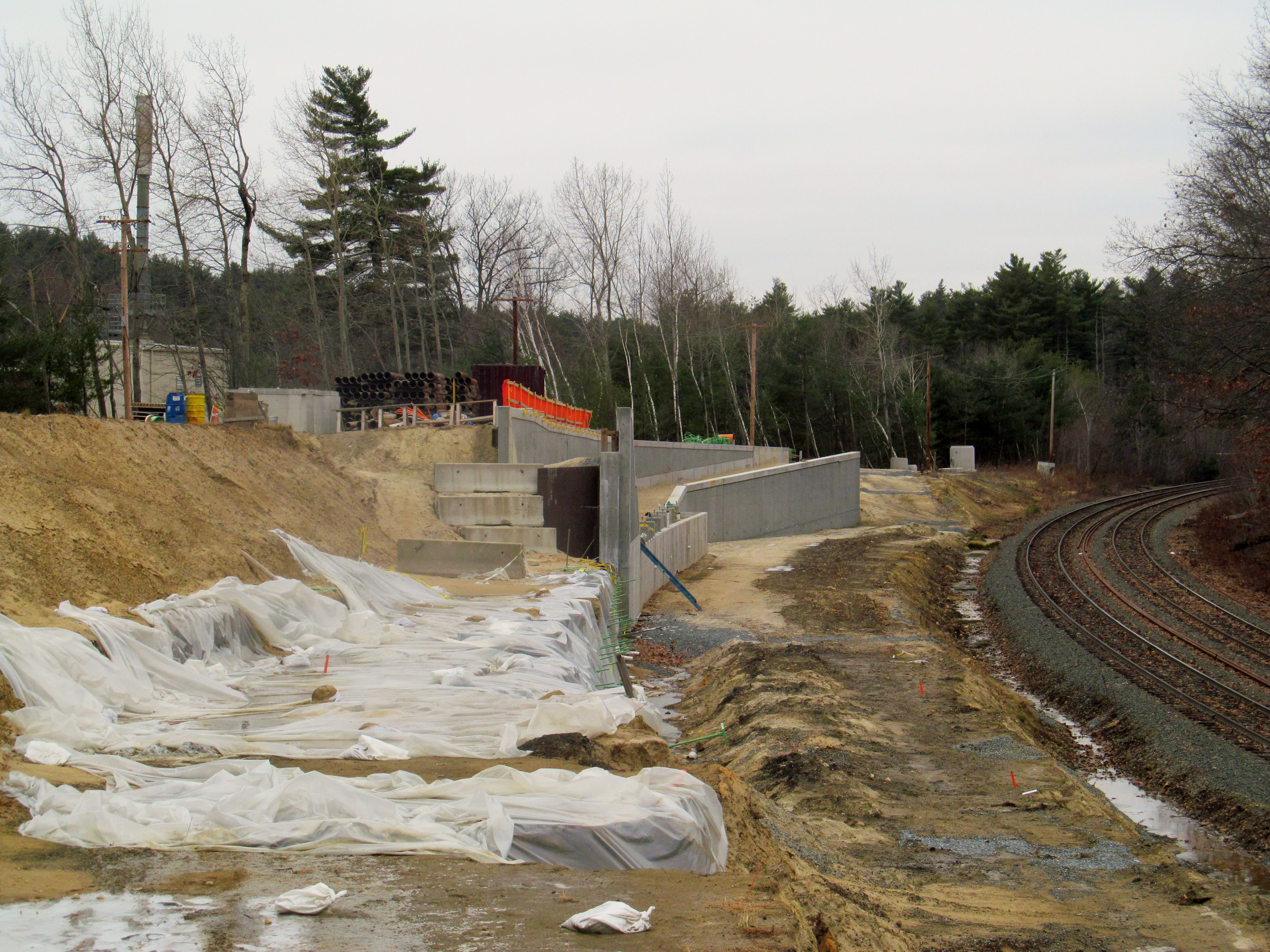
Station under construction in December 2014

The MBTA begin soliciting bids for pre-construction site preparation for the station and the associated layover yard in June 2012. A $3.75 million contract was awarded and notice to proceed given on November 26, 2012. Site preparation work began in early December. Bidding on a nominally-$27.592 million contract for the primary station and layover yard construction opened in February 2013. Bids came in lower than expected; a $22.9 million contract was awarded on May 22, 2013, for construction to be completed by the end of 2014. Track and signal work and bridge repairs were placed in separate contracts.

Notice to proceed for construction was given on June 14, 2013. A second publicized groundbreaking was held on August 12, 2013. In January 2014, an MBTA presentation stated that service would begin in "early 2015". By October 2014, the planned completion date slipped to later in 2015, partially due to a bonding company taking over for the original contractor which went out of business.

In October 2014, MART announced that it would run dedicated bus service from Gardner to Wachusett station when the station opened. By the end of 2014, retaining walls for ramps to the platforms and concrete bases for light poles in the parking lot were in place. Track and signal work on the Pan Am Southern mainline began in Spring 2015. In January 2015, the opening was delayed further to Fall 2016.

On July 11, 2016, the MassDOT Board approved spending an additional $19 million to finish the station by the end of September, bringing the total cost of the extension to $93.3 million. The additional cost included replacement for several Pan Am Southern-owned bridges which were in poorer shape than originally thought, and night and weekend work to speed completion. Service to the station had to begin by September 30, or the state risked a revocation of the $59.2 million in federal funds. Limited service began on September 30, 2016, with two weekday round trips; full service began with the schedule change on November 21, 2016.

The station was estimated to draw 400 daily riders upon opening. By February 2017, ridership averaged 45 to 75 passengers per day, but was growing. This increased to 132 in a 2018 count, but was down to 83 in 2024. During winter months a free shuttle bus is offered to the Wachusett Mountain Ski Area. The shuttle is timed to connect with an MBTA "ski train", which includes a passenger car with ski racks.
