= Littleton/Route 495 station =

Rail station in Littleton, Massachusetts, US

Littleton/Rte 495
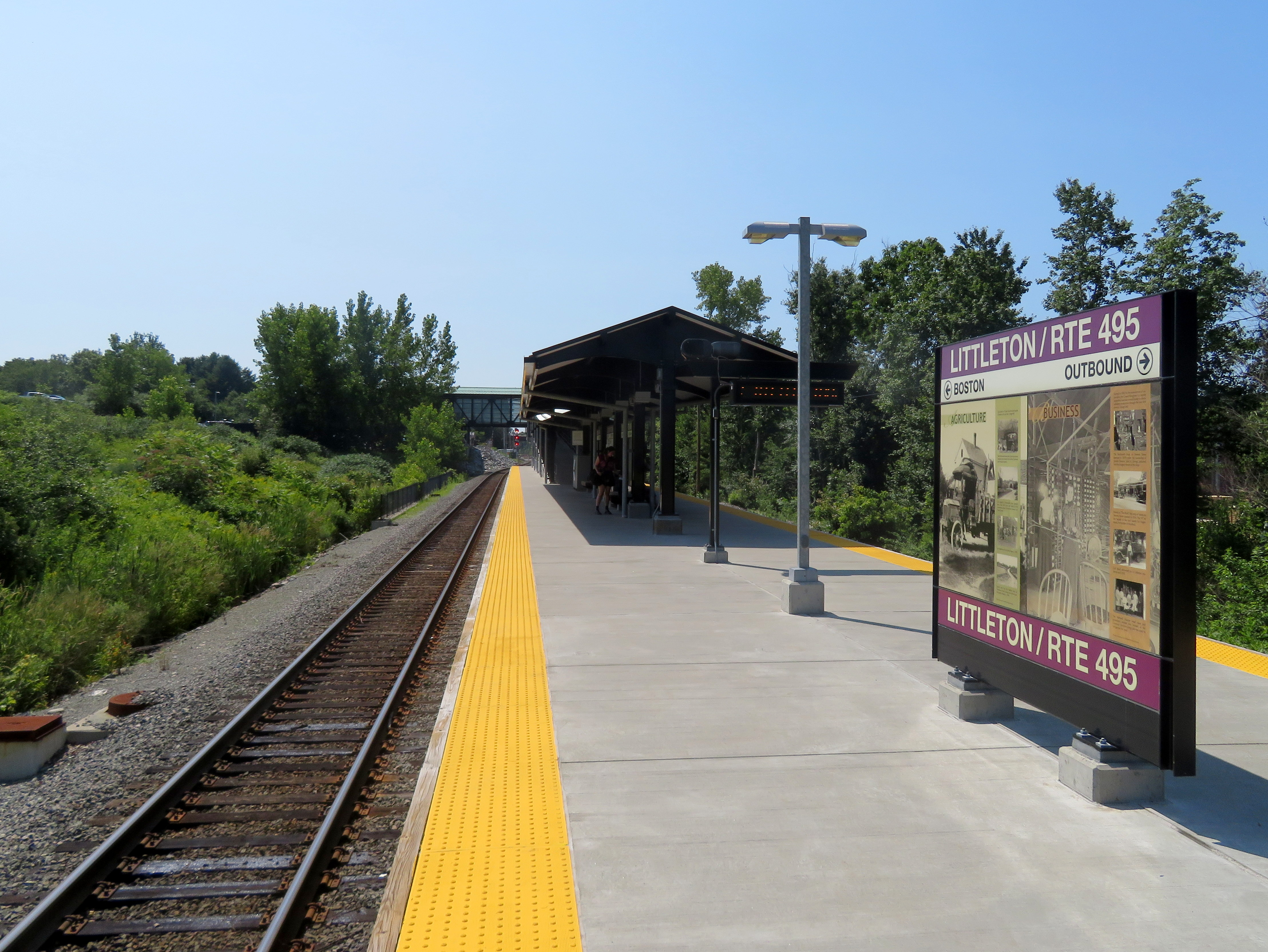
- Littleton/Route 495 station in July 2019

General information
- Location: Foster Street at Grimes Lane; Littleton, Massachusetts
- Coordinates: 42.52147°N 71.50348°W
- Line: Fitchburg Route
- Platforms: 1 island platform
- Tracks: 2
- Connections: MART: Harvard Commuter Shuttle

Construction
- Parking: 194 spaces ($4.00 daily)
- Accessible: Yes

Other information
- Fare zone: 7

History
- Opened: January 13, 1980
- Rebuilt: 2012–2013

Passengers
- 2024: 319 daily boardings

Services
| Preceding station | MBTA | Following station |
|---|---|---|
| Ayer toward Wachusett | Fitchburg Line | South Acton toward North Station |
Former services at Littleton station
| Preceding station | Boston and Maine Railroad | Following station |
|---|---|---|
| Ayer toward Troy | Boston – Troy | West Acton toward Boston |
Location

Littleton/Route 495 station is an MBTA Commuter Rail station in Littleton, Massachusetts. It serves the Fitchburg Line. The station is located at the intersection of Grimes Lane and Foster Street near Route 2 and I-495 and serves as a park-and-ride station for both highways.

A previous station was open at King Street in West Littleton until 1975. Littleton/Route 495 station opened several miles away in 1980 as an inexpensive park-and-ride to gather commuters from the northwest Boston suburbs. In 2011, work began on the construction of a new station, with a full-length handicapped accessible platform and a pedestrian bridge to the parking lot, as part of a larger project to improve the Fitchburg Line. After about 16 months of construction, the new station and pedestrian bridge opened in June 2013.

== History ==
=== Littleton station ===
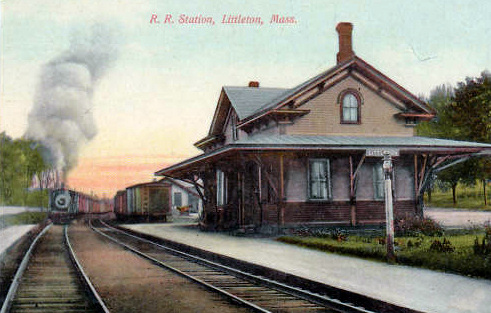
The 1879 Littleton depot on a 1910 postcard

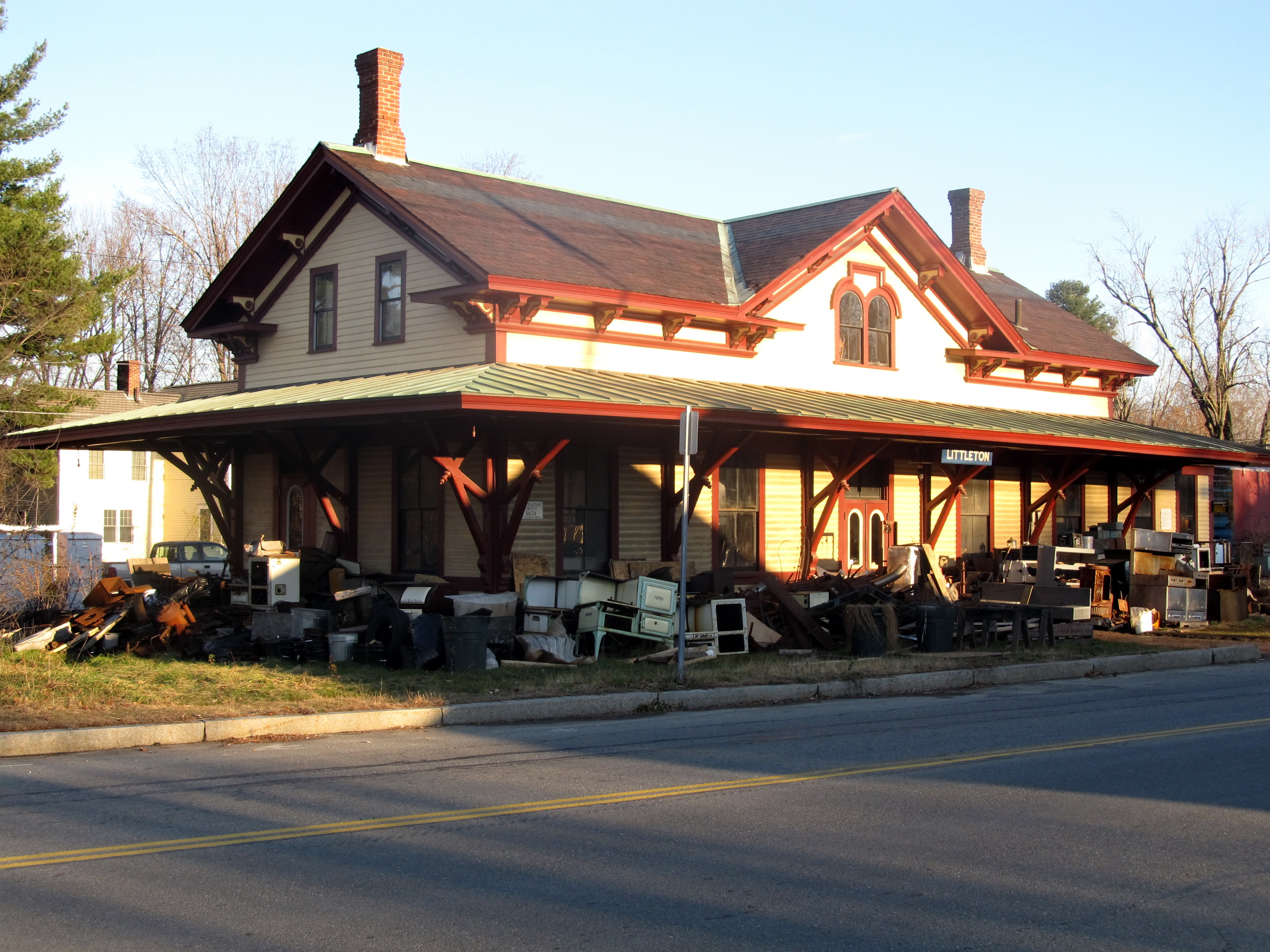
The depot was restored in 1976 and is now a stove restoration shop

The Fitchburg Railroad was extended westward from Cambridge between 1843 and 1845, reaching Littleton around November 1844. Residents at Littleton Common did not like the appearance of the railroad, so it was routed through what was called West Littleton or Harwood Junction instead. A large two-story station was placed there at the intersection of King Street and Taylor Street. The long building included separate rooms for passengers and freight, and a living area for the station master. In 1879, the Fitchburg replaced it with a Victorian-style depot building a few feet to the east. The old station was moved south on Taylor Street and served as an apartment building for some time thereafter.

Residents were not allowed to ride trains on Sundays until 1850, and for some time thereafter only for the purpose of attending religious services. Despite minor accidents in 1845 and 1849, and a crash of the Tunnel Express on October 7, 1880, which killed two passengers, the railroad became important to daily life in Littleton. Freight including building materials, apples, and milk were shipped from several locations, including the depot. Much of the cattle transported on the line between 1885 and 1930 passed through the quarantine station in Littleton. The railroad also delivered the daily mail, its primary source of profit. The station became a center of local commerce and industry, with both housing and businesses erected around Depot Square.

Several plans were made between 1900 and 1906 to construct a street railway, but no construction took place. The B&M secured a bus franchise in the town in 1926.

Service continued to the Littleton station for over 120 years, run by the Fitchburg Railroad until 1900 and thereafter by the Boston and Maine Railroad (B&M). Fifteen cars on a B&M freight derailed at Littleton on May 27, 1956, injuring one resident and blocking the main line for days. The B&M began to sharply cut back passenger service in the early 1960s, but in 1964 the newly formed Massachusetts Bay Transportation Authority (MBTA) began to subsidize their northside commuter services. However, on January 18, 1965, funding cuts resulted in Fitchburg Line service being cut back to West Concord. After subsidy arrangements were made with several towns, service was partially extended back to Ayer – including the Littleton stop – on June 28, 1965.

The depot building was closed in 1970, leaving passengers to wait at the crossing. The building was occupied for a time by McElroy Manfucturing Corporation (a telegraph producer) then later that year by Learning Things (an educational product developer). In 1976, it was bought and restored to original condition by David Erikson, who operates Erikson's Antique Stoves from the building.

In December 1973, state subsidies for towns outside the MBTA funding district were halved, resulting in the MBTA needing to renegotiate subsidies from 14 municipalities. Littleton, with just 21 daily commuters, refused to pay its $12,300 bill in 1974; Ayer also failed to reach an agreement. On March 1, 1975, the line was cut back to South Acton, dropping the stops at Ayer, Littleton, and West Acton.

=== Littleton/Route 495 ===
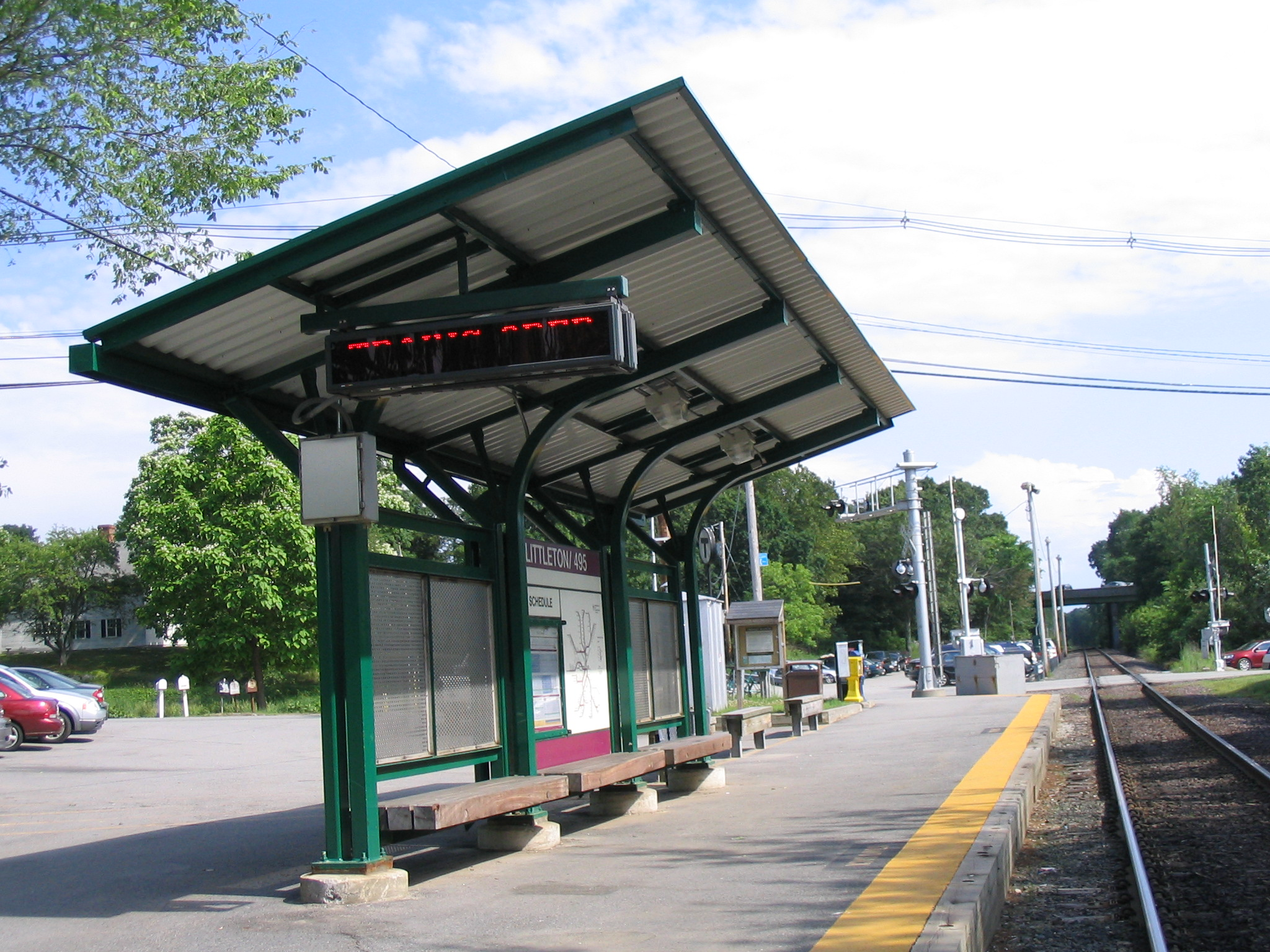
The 1980s-era shelter photographed in 2006

On December 27, 1976, the MBTA bought the B&M's northside commuter rail assets, including the entire length of the Fitchburg Line. The closure of the Lexington Branch the next month represented the limit of the contraction of the northside lines; as a results of the 1973–74 Arab Oil Embargo and especially the 1979 Iranian oil crisis, a period of rapid expansion began in the end of the 1970s. On January 13, 1980, service was extended back to Fitchburg and on to Gardner. However, the previous station location in West Littleton offered little to no parking space, and it was not reopened. A new station, Littleton/Route 495, opened some 1.6 miles (2.6 km) to the southeast, using spare parking lots from an adjacent industrial firm. It was located on Foster Street just off the interchange of Route 2 and I-495, and named after the latter. The station consisted of a 200-foot (61 m)-long low-level asphalt platform with a bus stop-style shelter. A small canopy shelter was added in 2003.

From 1981 until the 1990s, Littleton was the turnback point for a limited number of trains. Its unpaved parking lot was just 15 spaces (plus about 25 unofficial spaces) which was insufficient for demand. In 1995, local officials proposed building a new station with dedicated highway ramps off Route 2 to the southeast, as the Foster Street site was considered too rural for a garage or large lot. The Route 2 site was rejected because of nearby protected wetlands, but considered again later in the decade.

=== New station ===
As part of a $159 million upgrade project on the Fitchburg line, Littleton/Route 495 station was completely rebuilt in 2012–13. A second track was added from South Acton to Ayer through Littleton, which necessitated replacement of the low-level platform that occupied the track slot. Additionally, the 1980-built station was not accessible for handicapped riders and could not accommodate the full length of trains. The new station, which was built just outbound of the 1980-built platform, has an 800-foot-long high-level platform for speedy, fully handicapped accessible boarding. A pedestrian bridge with ramps connects the platform to the parking lot.

Bidding for the new construction opened on August 18, 2011, with the bidding period lasting until September 20. Construction work on the new platform started in early 2012; the platform was in place by mid-summer, and the main span of the pedestrian bridge was lifted into place in early November. The new station and bridge opened on June 3, 2013; a ceremony was held with public officials later that month. The 1980-built platform was demolished soon after the new station opened.

South Acton was previously the short turn terminus of some trains; however, those trains were extended to Littleton effective August 4, 2014. The completion of the new two-track station allows local such terminating trains to board on one track while another train passes on the other track; the design of the station with an island platform (instead of two side platforms) eliminates confusion as to which platform such terminating trains would serve.

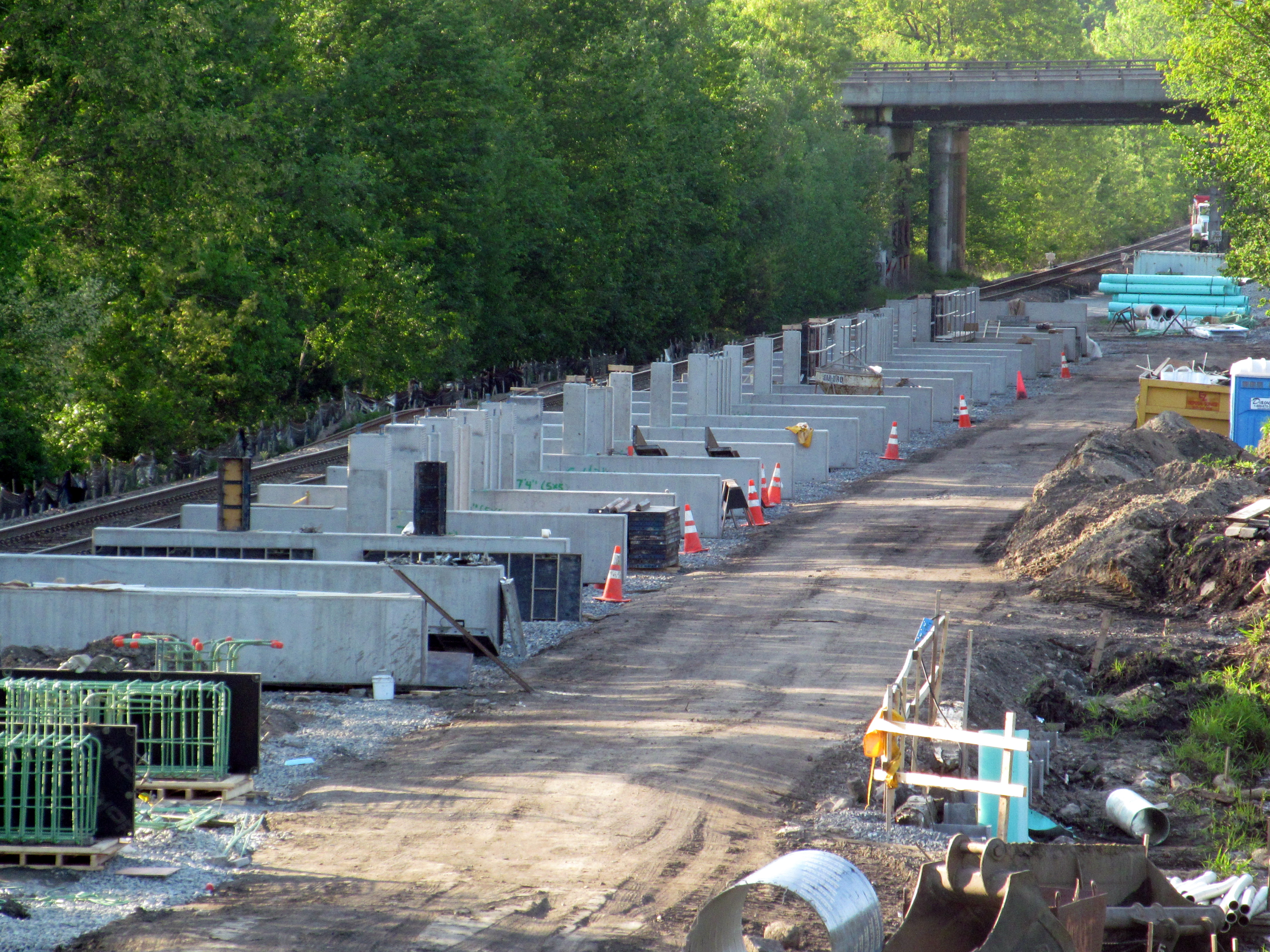
New platform supports under construction in May 2012

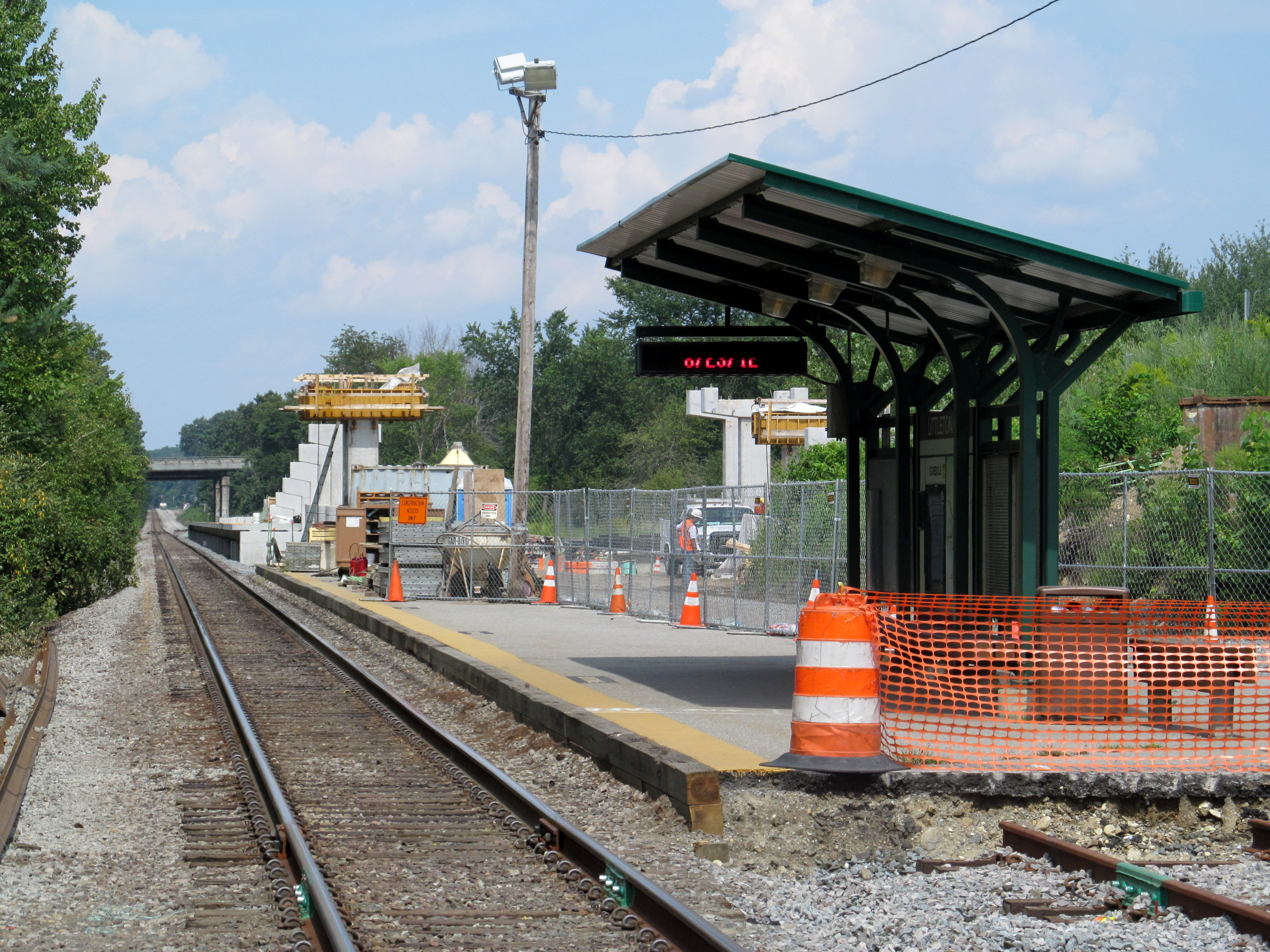
New platform installed and pedestrian overpass under construction behind the old station in August 2012

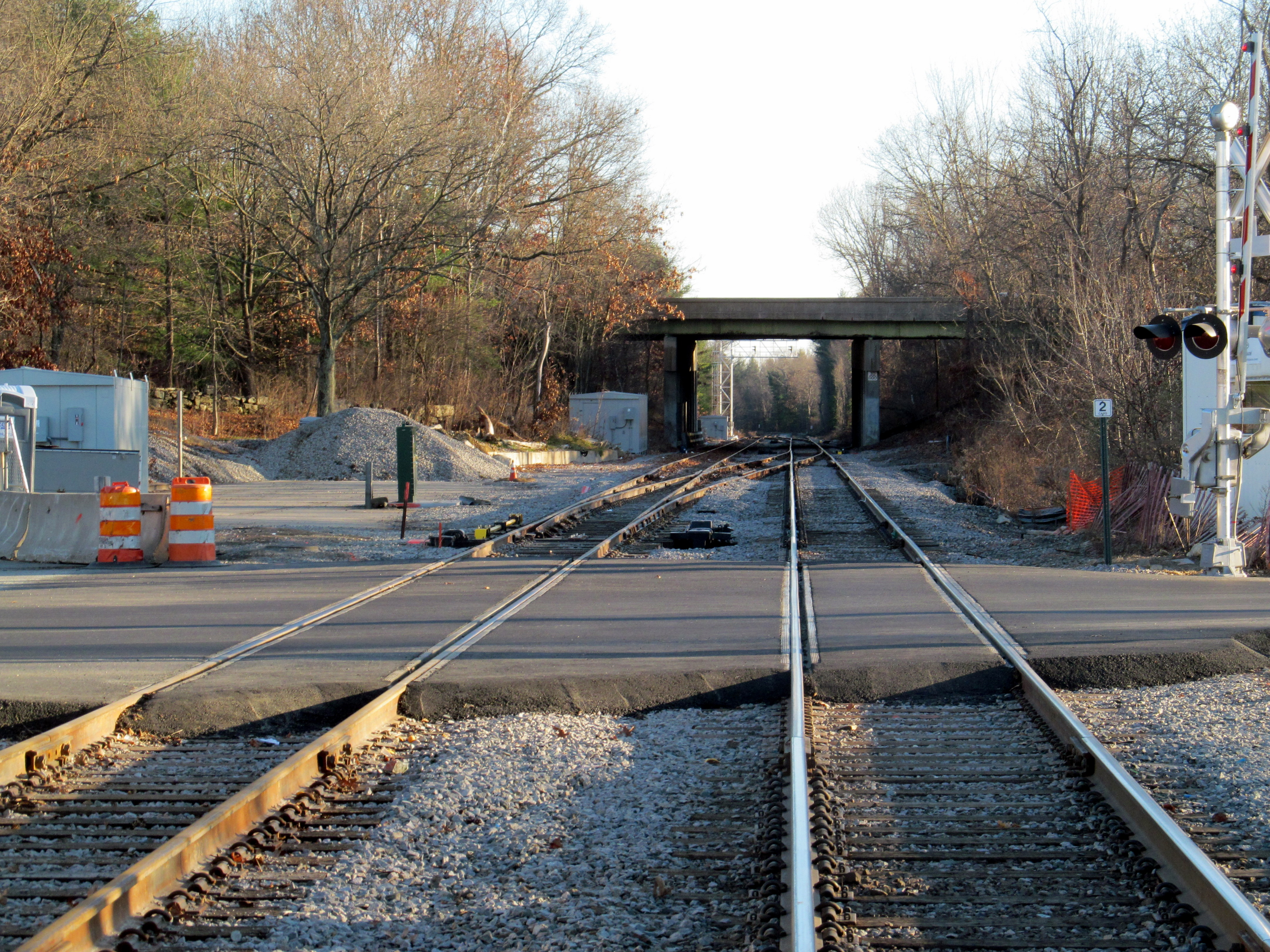
Second track through the Foster Street crossing and new interlocking installed in 2012

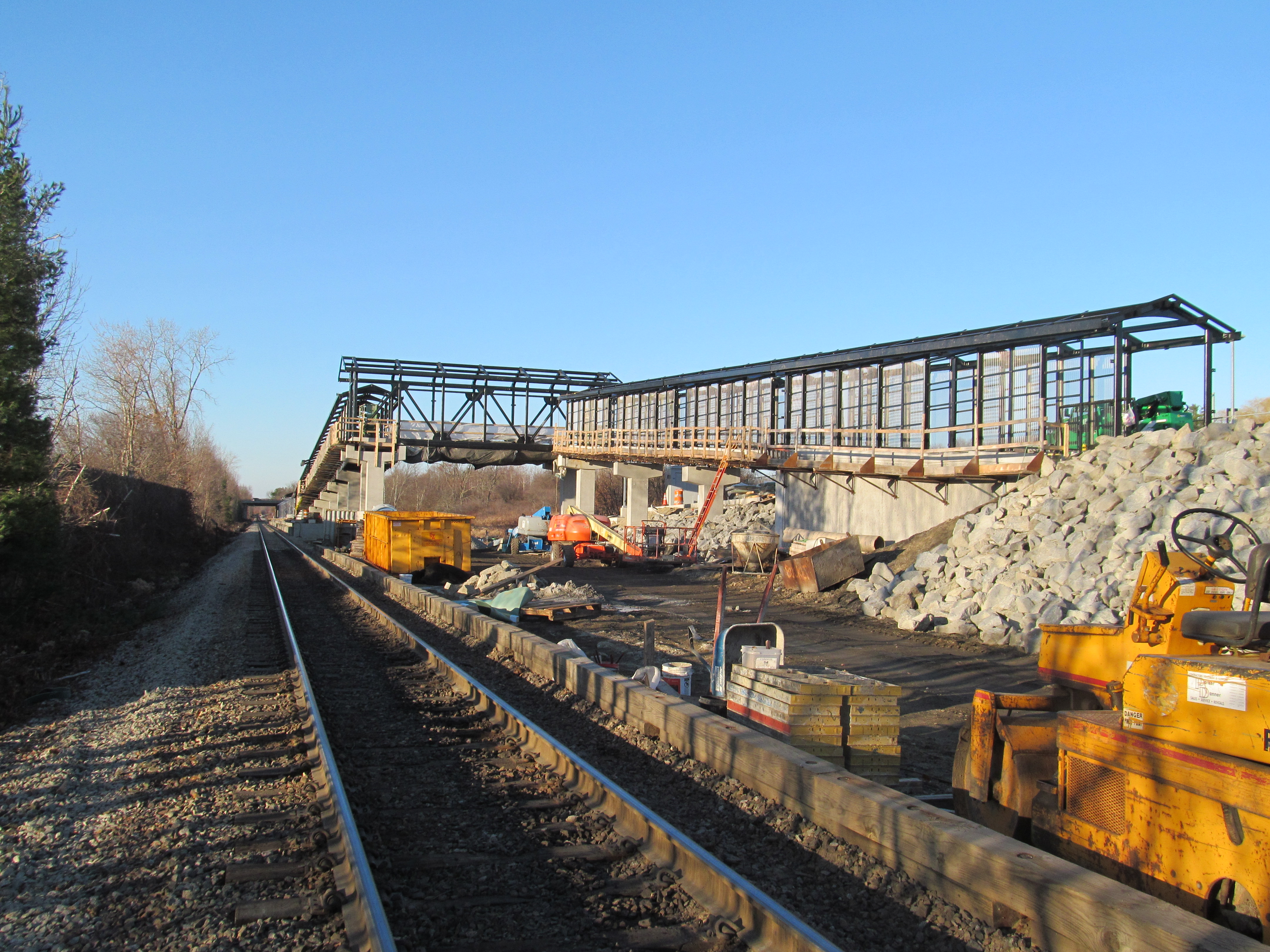
Pedestrian bridge under construction in November 2012

=== Parking plans ===
Expanded service and parking at Littleton was expected to mitigate the existing parking lot overcrowding at South Acton. To replace the 44-space lot at Littleton that was removed for construction access, the MBTA bought a nearby private lot nearby in 2011, expanded it to 195 spaces, and added an off-street drop-off area. The additional parking proved so popular that in 2014, Littleton town officials considered the construction of a 200-space garage. A September 2014 parking study recommended adding parking on adjacent properties, implementing a shuttle service from residential areas, and adding bicycle storage areas and sidewalks to increase bicycle and pedestrian arrivals.

In late 2015, the MBTA added 24 parking spaces off Grimes Lane as an interim measure. In April 2017, the MBTA announced $1.5 million in funding to expand parking at the station, with between 43 and 109 additional spaces. As of August 2019, the MBTA planned for an increase of 60 spaces.

=== Other Littleton stations ===
Map of former and current stations in and around Littleton

Several other railroad stations, now closed, were located in or served Littleton.

North Littleton station was located on the 1858-opened Stony Brook Railroad at Great Road (Route 119). The station building was closed in 1914 and torn down in 1928. It was served by all three daily round trips in 1917, but only a single westbound trip stopped by 1929, and it was no longer served by the 1940s. While open, it had been a flag stop for local trains as well as the overnight State of Maine Express.

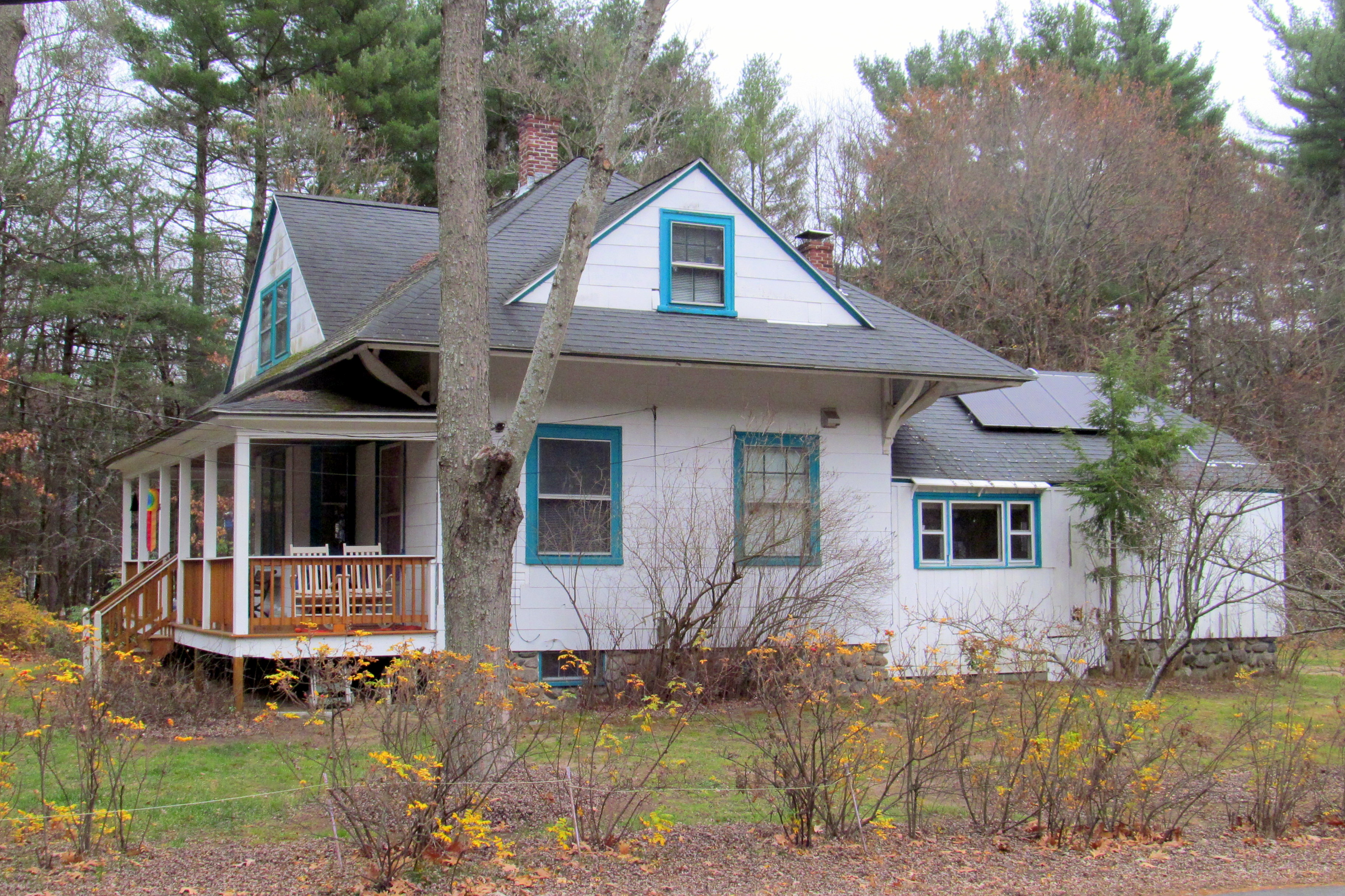
The former Pine Ridge station in 2016

The Stony Brook also served two stops just outside Littleton. Willows (also called Sandy Pond) was located at the junction with the Fitchburg Railroad at Willow Road in Pingryville, Ayer. It was served only by Stony Brook trains by 1917 (and may have never served mainline trains), and closed by 1929. Forge Village was located at Pleasant Street (Route 225) in Forge Village in Westford. It remained in use until local passenger service ended in April 1953. The line remained open for freight use.

The Fitchburg Railroad also stopped at Boxboro station at Depot Road, just south of the Littleton town line. West Acton station was closer to Boxboro Center; Boxboro station saw limited service by the 1940s and was closed entirely before the MBTA era.

The Nashua, Acton and Boston Railroad, which ran from Concord to Nashua, ran through Westford with two stations near the eastern part of Littleton. Passenger service on the line ran from 1876 to 1924; it was abandoned entirely in 1925. East Littleton station was located at Littleton Road (MA 110), about a mile east of Littleton Common. It received frequent shipments of coal and grain for the Conant and Company store nearby. Pine Ridge station (also known as Westford) was located at Forge Village Road. The former station building has been converted to a private residence; the former freight house and section house are used as outbuildings.
