= West Acton station (MBTA) =

West Acton
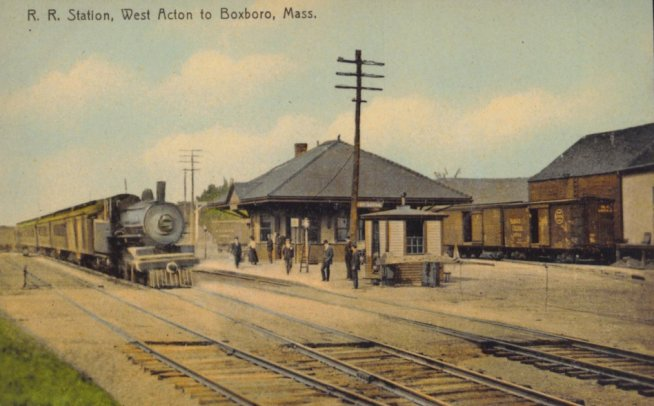
- West Acton station on a c. 1910 postcard

General information
- Location: Massachusetts Avenue near Spruce Street; Acton, Massachusetts
- Coordinates: 42.476586°N 71.473371°W
- Line: Fitchburg Main Line
- Tracks: 2

History
- Closed: March 1, 1975

Services
| Preceding station | MBTA | Following station |
|---|---|---|
| Littleton toward Ayer | Fitchburg Line until 1975 | South Acton toward North Station |
Location

West Acton was a railway station in Acton, Massachusetts. It served the MBTA Commuter Rail Fitchburg Line and was located in the West Acton village. The station was closed in 1975.

== History ==
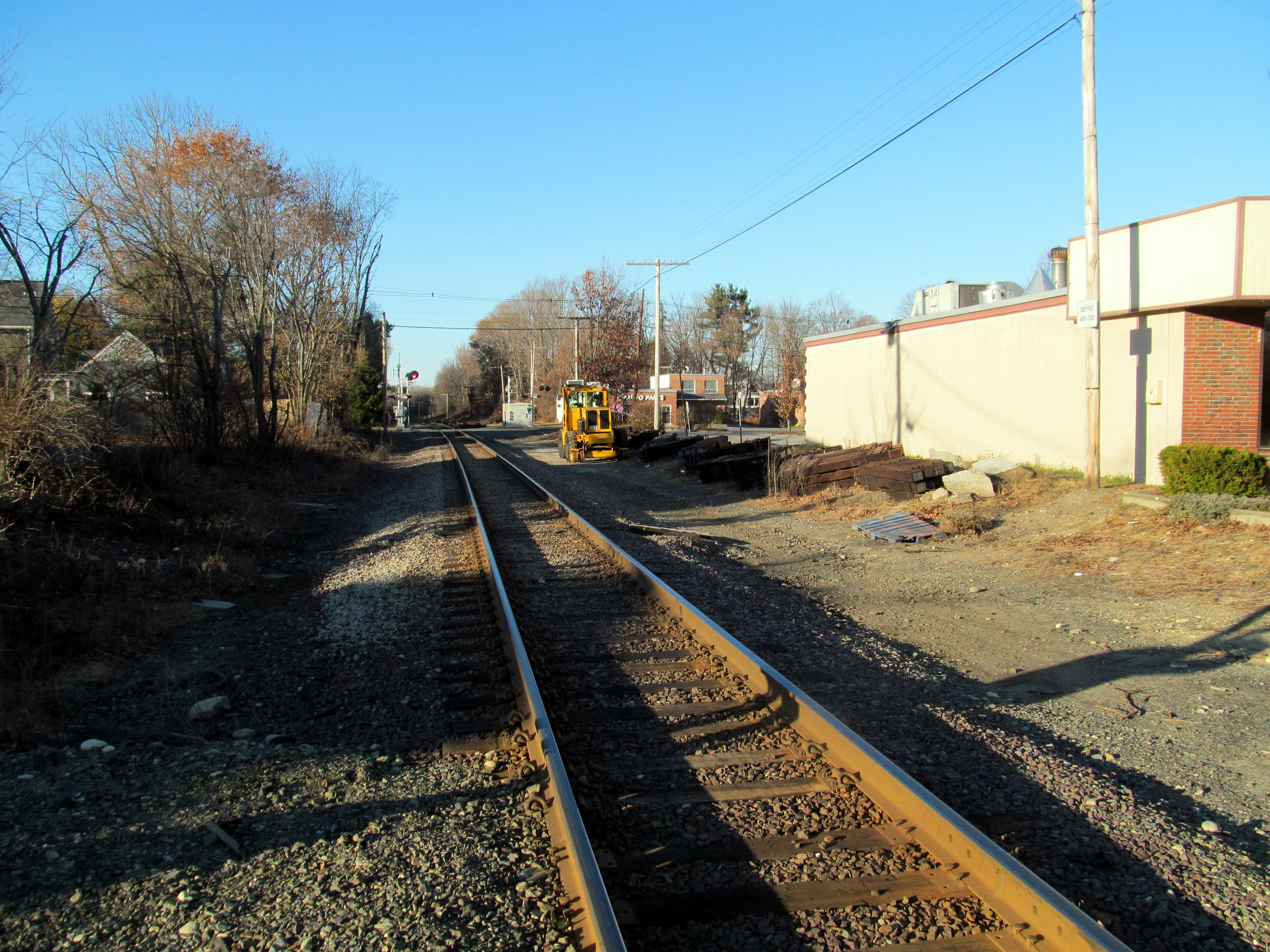
Site of the former West Acton station, photographed in 2012

West Acton station was a flag stop by 1858. It served the village of West Acton, and later Boxborough when its stop was closed in the 1930s. The station building, located on the east side of the tracks, was demolished in the mid 1960s as ridership declined.

When the newly formed MBTA began subsidizing the Boston & Maine Railroad's intrastate service on January 18, 1965, service was only kept to communities in the MBTA's limited funding district. All service on the Fitchburg Line west of West Concord, including to West Acton, was cut. Service was restored as far as Ayer on June 28, 1965, after several towns reached subsidy agreements with the MBTA.

In December 1973, state subsidies for towns outside the MBTA funding district were halved, resulting in the MBTA needing to renegotiate subsidies from 14 municipalities. Ultimately Ayer, with just 14 daily commuters, refused to pay its $8200 bill in 1974; Littleton also refused $12,300 for its 21 riders. On March 1, 1975, the line was cut back to South Acton, dropping stops at Ayer, Littleton, and West Acton.

When service was restored in 1980, West Acton (which was considered too close to South Acton) and Shirley were not reopened, in order to speed travel times to Gardner. Shirley reopened in 1981, but West Acton has remained closed.
