= Shirley station (MBTA) =

Train station in Shirley, Massachusetts, US

Shirley
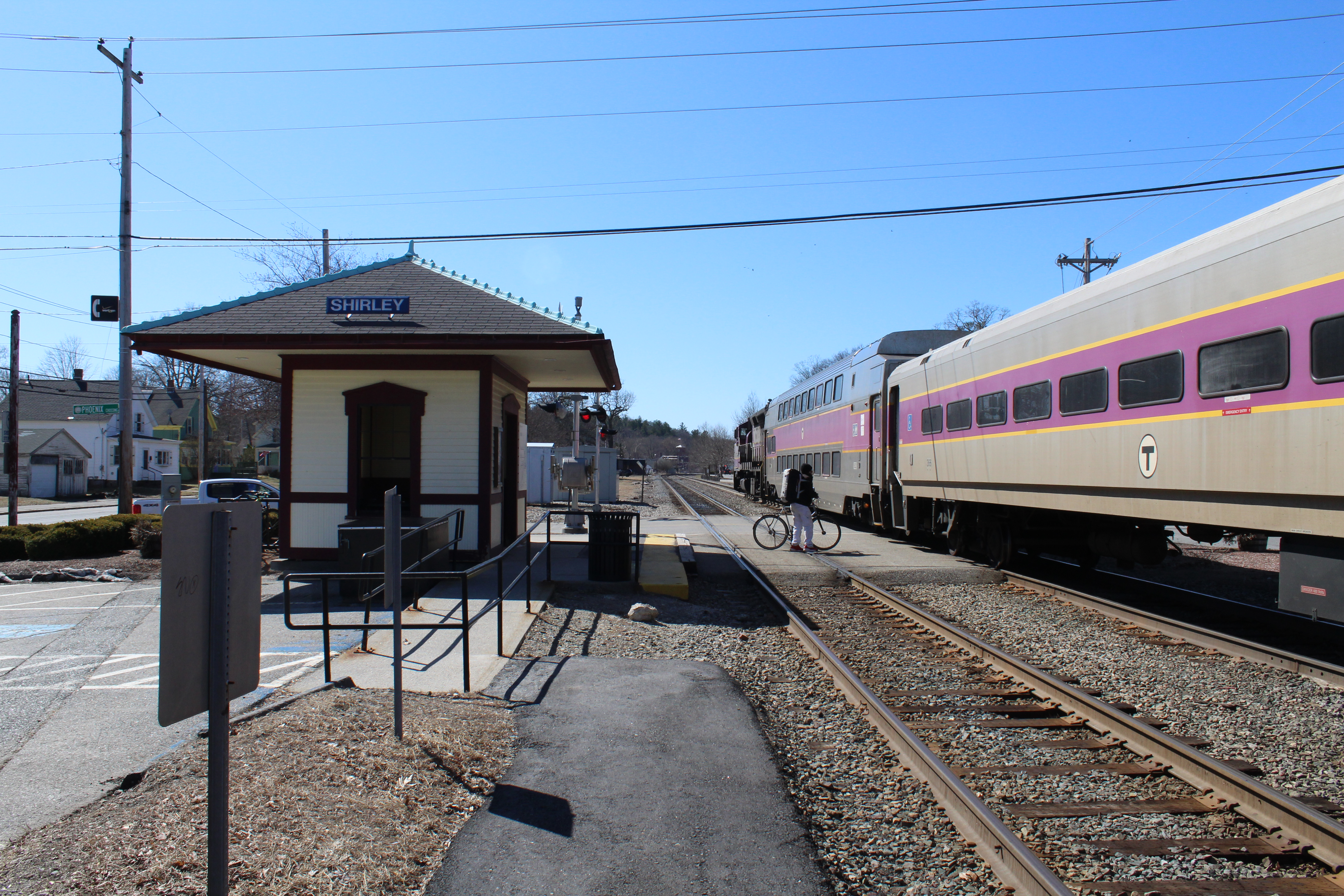
- An outbound train at Shirley station in March 2020

General information
- Location: Ayer Road and Phoenix Street; Shirley, Massachusetts
- Coordinates: 42.54505°N 71.64815°W
- Line: Fitchburg Route
- Platforms: 1 side platform
- Tracks: 2

Construction
- Parking: 25 spaces (free)
- Cycle facilities: yes
- Accessible: No

Other information
- Fare zone: 8

History
- Opened: December 30, 1844; May 1981
- Closed: January 18, 1965
- Rebuilt: 1993

Passengers
- 2024: 103 (weekday average boardings)

Services
Preceding station	MBTA	Following station
North Leominster toward Wachusett	Fitchburg Line	Ayer toward North Station
Former services
Preceding station	Boston and Maine Railroad	Following station
North Leominster toward Troy	Boston – Troy	Ayer toward Boston
Location

Shirley station is an MBTA Commuter Rail station in Shirley, Massachusetts. It serves the Fitchburg Line, and is located in the village center. The station consists of a short low-level platform with an asphalt patch for passengers to cross the tracks, plus a small wooden shelter on the inbound side. Shirley station is not accessible.

== History ==
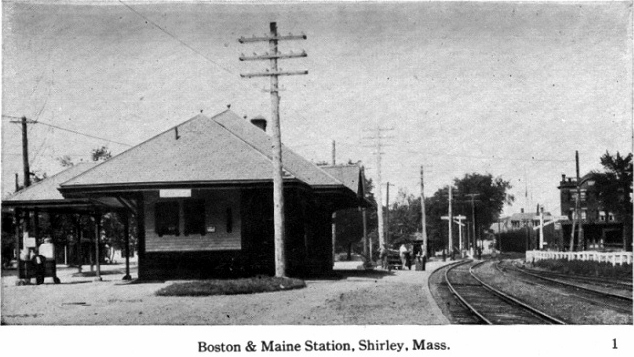
Shirley station on a postcard from the early 1900s

The Fitchburg Railroad opened to Shirley on December 30, 1844. The station was located near Davis Street. Service - later operated by the Boston and Maine Railroad - lasted until the newly formed Massachusetts Bay Transportation Authority began to subsidize service in 1965. The section of the line from West Concord to Fitchburg was outside the MBTA's funding district, and service was cut back to West Concord on January 18, 1965. The mid-sized station building was torn down around this time.

The line was re-extended as far as Ayer (one stop inbound of Shirley) later in 1965 and cut back to South Acton in 1975. Service was extended out to Gardner in January 1980, but the stops at Shirley and West Acton were not restored. Shirley reopened in May 1981 at Phoenix Street, 0.2 miles (0.32 km) east of the former site, with a small plexiglass bus stop shelter on the inbound side. The bus shelter was replaced by a hip-roofed wooden structure - its style based on the original Shirley station - in 1993.

In May 2024, the MBTA indicated the possibility of building accessible platforms shorter than standard length at Shirley.
