= Ayer station =

Railway station in Ayer, Massachusetts, US

Ayer
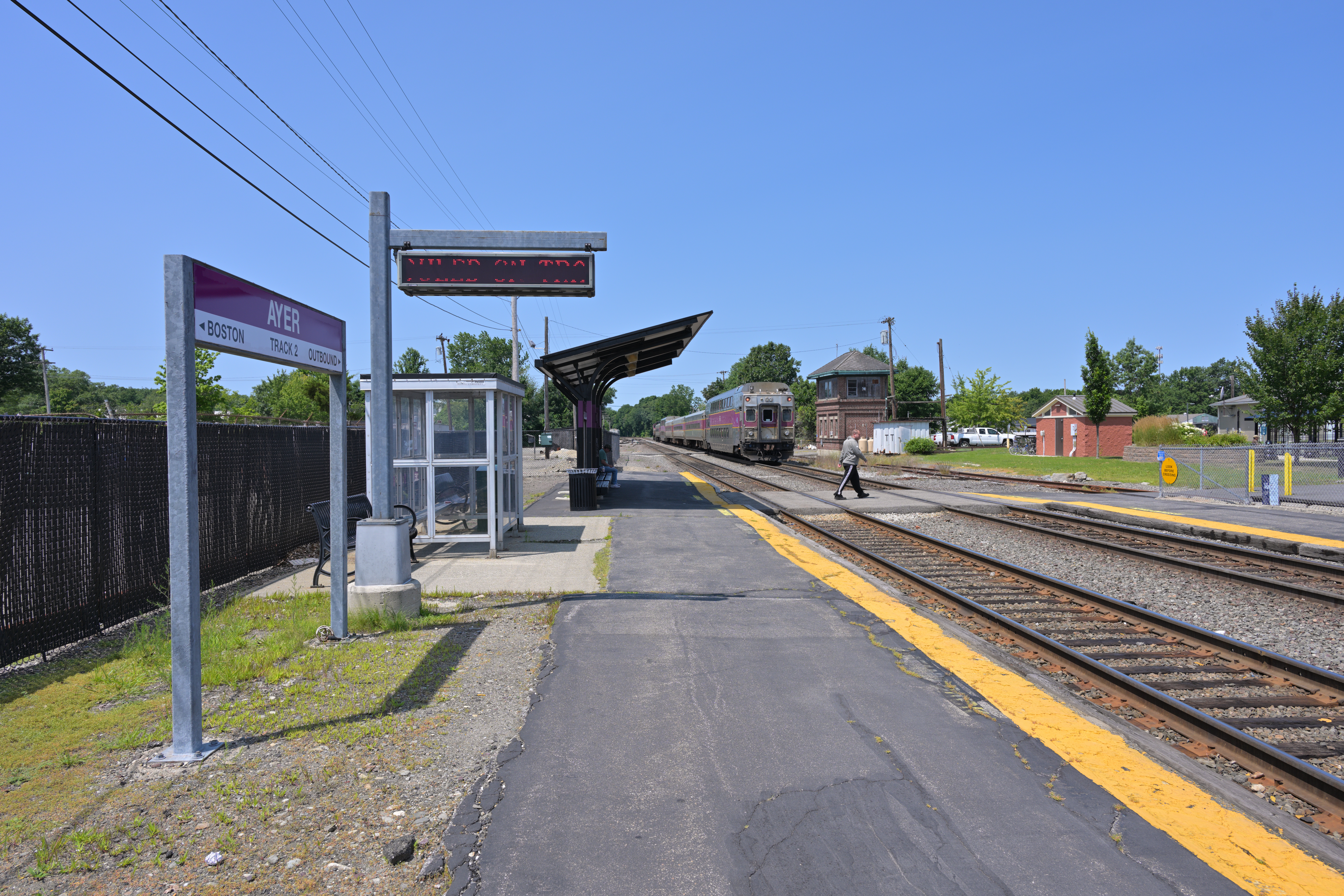
- Platforms at Ayer, looking westward, in 2026

General information
- Location: 70 Main Street (Routes 2A/111); Ayer, Massachusetts
- Coordinates: 42°33′32.63″N 71°35′22.82″W
- Lines: Fitchburg Route; CSX Worcester Main Line; Greenville Branch
- Platforms: 2 side platforms
- Tracks: 3

Construction
- Parking: 180 spaces
- Accessible: No

Other information
- Fare zone: 8

History
- Opened: December 1845
- Closed: January 18–June 28, 1965; March 1, 1975–January 13, 1980
- Rebuilt: 1848, 1895-96, c. 1970, 1980

Passengers
- 2024: 190 daily boardings

Services
Preceding station	MBTA	Following station
Shirley toward Wachusett	Fitchburg Line	Littleton/Route 495 toward North Station
Former services
Preceding station	Boston and Maine Railroad	Following station
Shirley toward Fitchburg	Boston – Fitchburg	Littleton toward Boston
Fitchburg toward Troy	Boston – Troy	Littleton toward Boston
Harvard toward Worcester	Worcester – Nashua	Groton toward Nashua
Harvard toward Worcester	Worcester – Lowell	Willows toward Lowell
Location

Ayer station is an MBTA Commuter Rail station located off Main Street (Route 2A/111) in the Ayer Main Street Historic District of Ayer, Massachusetts. It serves the Fitchburg Line. There are three tracks through the station, two of which are served by a pair of low-level side platforms, which are not accessible. There is a shelter on the inbound platform.

Ayer has been a major railroad interchange since the Fitchburg Railroad opened through South Groton in 1845, followed by the Stony Brook Railroad, Worcester and Nashua Railroad, and Peterborough and Shirley Railroad in 1848. The original depot was replaced with a union station with a large trainshed in 1848. Land speculation and industrial development spurred by the railroad access expanded the tiny farm village into the independent town of Ayer.

A new station was constructed in 1896. By 1900, the town was served by five lines all controlled by the Boston and Maine Railroad, with service to Boston, Worcester, and Lowell plus New York, New Hampshire, and Maine. Passenger service ended on all of the lines except the Fitchburg mainline between 1931 and 1961. After a brief disruption in early 1965, the Massachusetts Bay Transportation Authority began subsidizing commuter rail service to Ayer as part of what would become the Fitchburg Line. The station and part of the line was closed in 1975, but reopened in 1980. CSX Transportation also runs freight trains through the town to various destinations.

Planning began in 2003 for a parking structure to serve park-and-ride commuters at the station. After delays caused by disagreements with a property owner, the property to ensure a public access route to the station was acquired by the town in June 2016, allowing the parking expansion to proceed. The garage opened in 2019, with improvements to the station entrance constructed in 2020–21.

== Station layout ==
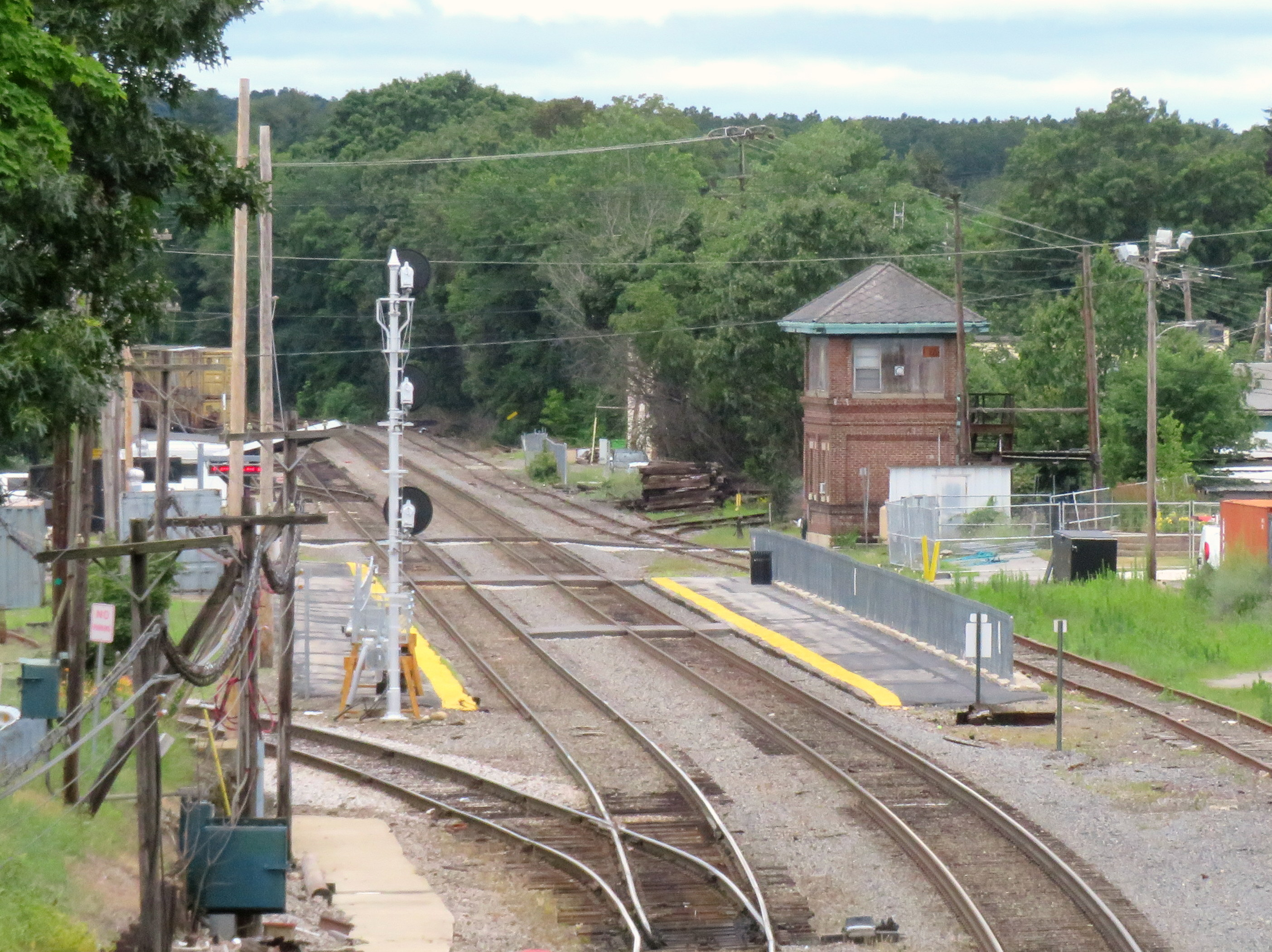
Ayer station in 2021. The wye to the Worcester Branch is at left, with the Wall Track at far right.

Ayer station is located in downtown Ayer, just south of Main Street (Route 2A/111) adjacent to the Ayer Main Street Historic District. The two-track Fitchburg Route mainline runs east-west, with two side platforms for the Fitchburg Line service bracketing the tracks. The platforms are low-level; the station is not accessible. A bus loop is located near the west end of the platforms, while a 180-space parking garage is about 600 feet (180 m) to the north.

Ayer is a node for CSX Transportation freight service, with the Fitchburg Route serving as part of its main line. A wye on the south side of the station connects the Fitchburg Route to the Worcester Branch. There are layups for freight trains east and west of the station, and a freight yard (known as Hill Yard) about a quarter mile to the south on the Worcester Branch.

The "Wall Track", a freight siding, runs along the north side of the north (outbound) platform; reaching the inbound platform from the town center requires crossing all three tracks. West of the station, the single-track Greenville Branch splits from the Wall Track and curves to the north; it serves a paper plant at Vose near West Groton.

== History ==
=== Railroad construction ===
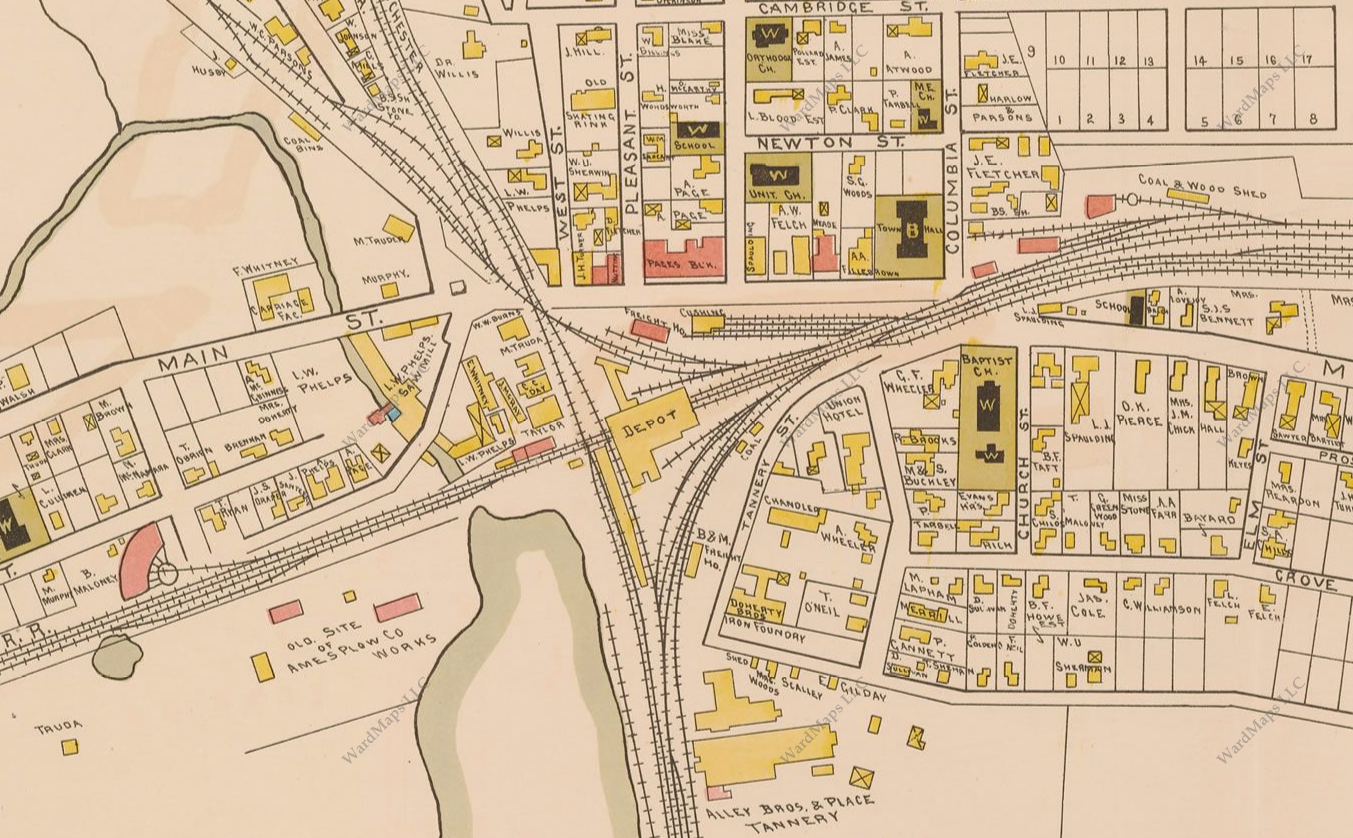
1889 map of Ayer Junction station and surrounding areas (north is to the upper left). The Fitchburg mainline runs approximately east-west, joined by the Stony Brook east of the station. The Worcester & Nashua runs approximately north-south, with the Peterborough & Shirley running to the northwest.

The Fitchburg Railroad main line opened on an east-west alignment through the tiny village of South Groton in Groton, Massachusetts in December 1845. Following a town vote the previous year, Groton station was established at Flannigan's Crossing (Groton-Harvard Road). The station was located on the southwest corner of the grade crossing, with a freight house just to its west and a woodshed (to supply early wood-burning locomotives) across the tracks.

Three more railroads followed in short succession. The Stony Brook Railroad opened from Ayer to North Chelmsford with service to Lowell in July 1848; it ran parallel to the Fitchburg for several miles east of downtown Ayer before branching to the northeast at Stony Brook Junction. Located at the junction, Willows station (also known as Sandy Pond) was the only other train station in Ayer and served both the Stony Brook and the Fitchburg. The Worcester and Nashua Railroad (W&N) opened between Worcester and Ayer on July 3, 1848; an extension north to Nashua, New Hampshire on December 18, 1848 crossed the Fitchburg on a diamond crossing and a connecting line was built on the southeast corner of the junction. The Peterborough and Shirley Railroad (P&S), opened in February 1848, crossed the northern section of the W&N at grade and ran to the northwest. It was leased to the Fitchburg before opening and fully acquired in 1860. The line had originally been intended to meet the Fitchburg Railroad in Shirley to the west, but the terminus was changed to Groton to connect with the W&N.

=== Groton Junction and Ayer Junction ===
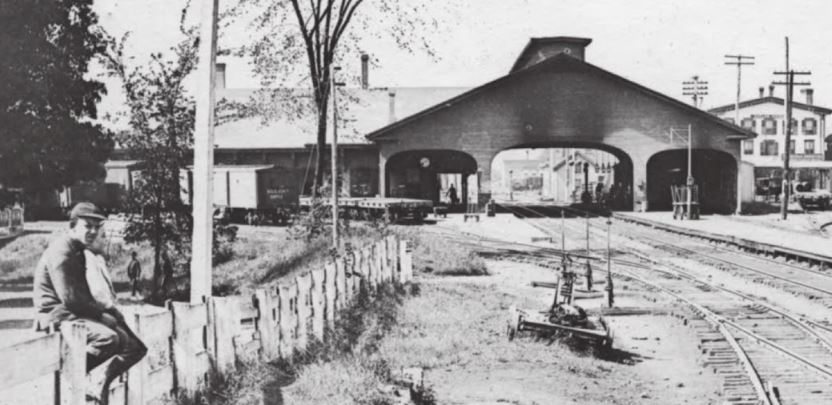
The 1848-built Union Station in September 1895, shortly before it was demolished

South Groton, until then "about a dozen farms of doubtful prosperity" and hindered by its remoteness, was quickly transformed by the railroads. A new union station known as Groton Junction was constructed in 1848 just east of the diamond crossing. Like many large stations of that era, it had a massive arched trainshed, which spanned the Fitchburg mainline. Smaller secondary arches to either side were intended for the Stony Brook and the P&S, but that arrangement soon proved inconvenient. A temporary wooden building was used while the union station was being constructed, although some W&N trains used the Fitchburg tracks to reach the original station. The temporary station and the original station and freight house were moved and used for other purposes in town; the temporary station burned in the 1872 fire, but the other two buildings lasted at least into the 1890s.

Between 1848 and 1852, land speculators laid out streets and commercial plots surrounding the new station. Industry, made possible by the railroad connections to major cities, soon arrived: a plow company in 1850, a tannery in 1854, and an iron foundry soon after. The city of Ayer, named after Groton-born James Cook Ayer, was incorporated from parts of Groton and Shirley in 1871; the railroad station was then renamed Ayer Junction. The station received a small expansion that year, and a covered island platform was built between the W&N tracks. The roof was rebuilt with new trusses; the former iron supporting pillars were used to construct the upper story of the nearby Spaulding Block. The wooden W&N platform was replaced with concrete in July 1873.

Ayer was devastated by a fire in 1872, but its industrial connections allowed for a period of rebuilding and even prosperity after. Most buildings in the Ayer Main Street Historic District were built during that time. When the Hoosac Tunnel opened in 1875, trains through Ayer could run on the Fitchburg and the Vermont and Massachusetts Railroad as far west as Troy, New York. With service to Troy, Boston, Nashua, Worcester, Lowell, and Greenville, Ayer Junction (soon shortened to Ayer) was a major rail interchange and the most important station on the Fitchburg Railroad between Concord and Fitchburg.

=== Consolidation under the B&M ===
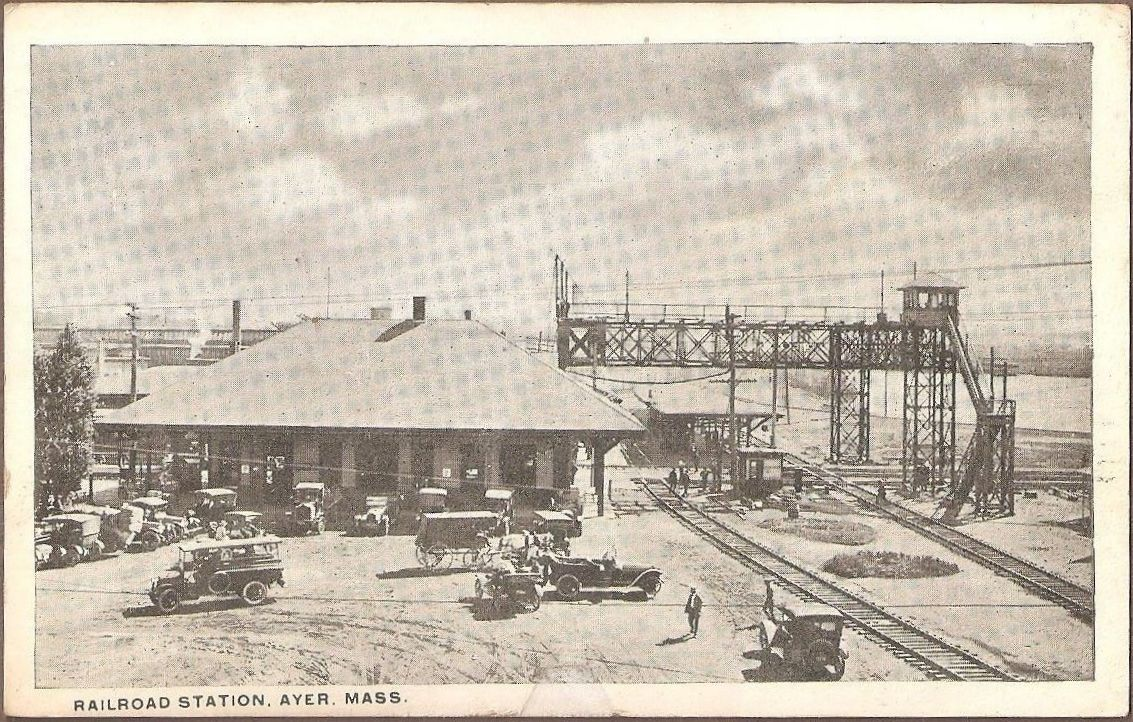
The station buildings and signal bridges in 1919

By the late 1880s, Ayer was a major rail junction and service point. Freight houses were located in the northeast and southeast corners of the junction, coal sheds in three locations, another engine house and freight house to the east, and a small roundhouse at Mechanic Street. The Worcester, Nashua and Rochester Railroad, the successor to the W&N, came under control of the Boston and Maine Railroad (B&M) in 1886, followed by the Boston and Lowell Railroad (which by then owned the Stony Brook) in 1887. The Brookline and Pepperell Railroad opened in 1894 and connected to the P&S in West Groton several miles to the north, with trains run through to Ayer. When the Fitchburg Railroad was acquired by the B&M in 1900, all lines through Ayer (and most of northern Massachusetts) were under its control.

In 1895, the Fitchburg and B&M demolished the 1848-built union station. Three new station buildings opened to replace it: passenger stations in the northeast and southeast corners of the junction, and a freight station along the southeast connecting track to replace the formerly separate freight houses. In 1897, the junction of the P&S was relocated slightly to the west to eliminate angled grade crossings of Main Street and Park Street. An island platform was constructed around that time between the two Fitchburg main tracks east of the diamond crossing to serve commuters to Boston.

In 1906, East Main Street was rerouted onto a bridge east of the station, eliminating traffic problems caused when trains blocked the grade crossing. The old Stony Brook freight house and engine house were removed as part of the construction, while a passenger tunnel was built to connect East Main Street, Faulkner Street, and the Fitchburg Division platform. Two signal bridges built at right angles over the junction in the 1910s and an interlocking tower built in 1929 controlled the various train movements across the complex junction. An American Railway Express Agency building and an extension of the freight house were added in the 1910s.

=== Decline of service ===
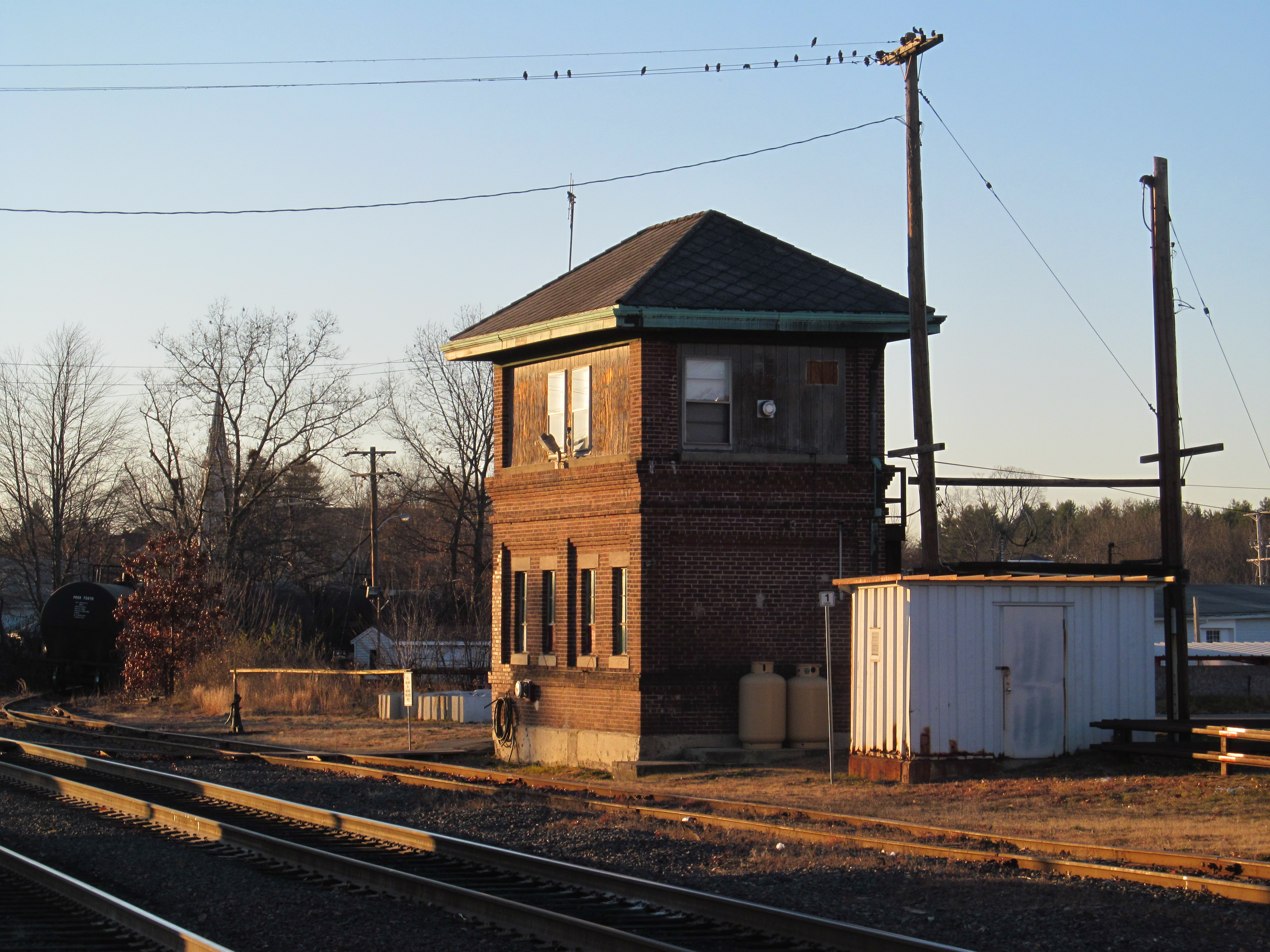
Ayer interlocking tower, which controlled access to the various rail lines running through Ayer

Although Camp Devens opening in 1917 briefly increased traffic, competition from interurban streetcars (including a line on Central Street built around 1905) then automobiles in the early 20th century forced the B&M to discontinue service on marginal branch lines, as well as redundant routes built during years of intense competition between railroads. Passenger service on the lightly used Brookline & Pepperell ended in 1931 and on the P&S in 1933. The Stony Brook, with its flatter grades than the W&N, became the preferred route for passenger and freight service to the north, particularly after a wye was constructed at North Chelmsford in 1930 allowing direct service to New Hampshire. Through Worcester-Portland local service ended in 1928; passenger service ended on the W&N north of Ayer in 1934, and part of the route to Nashua was outright abandoned within a decade.

In April 1946, the Stony Brook was connected directly to the Fitchburg at Stony Brook Junction, permitting the removal of its redundant rails between there and Ayer. Willows station had been closed by that time. The overnight New York City–Maine State of Maine used the routing until October 29, 1960; the B&M ran a single Budd RDC car between Worcester and Haverhill until the end of the year by state order.

As rail service and industry declined, Ayer made an awkward transition from a rail-centered town to a car-centered town. The southern depot was demolished around 1960; the former northern depot and surrounding land was sold to a local business owner on September 29, 1960. The provisions of the sale and later transactions included deed restrictions requiring the purchaser to provide an easement for public station access as well as a station facility for 100 years. Service along the Fitchburg main line was cut back to Fitchburg that same year, leaving Fitchburg Line commuter service between Fitchburg and Boston as the sole remaining passenger service through Ayer when the Massachusetts Bay Transportation Authority (MBTA) was created in 1964 to subsidize suburban commuter services.

=== MBTA era ===
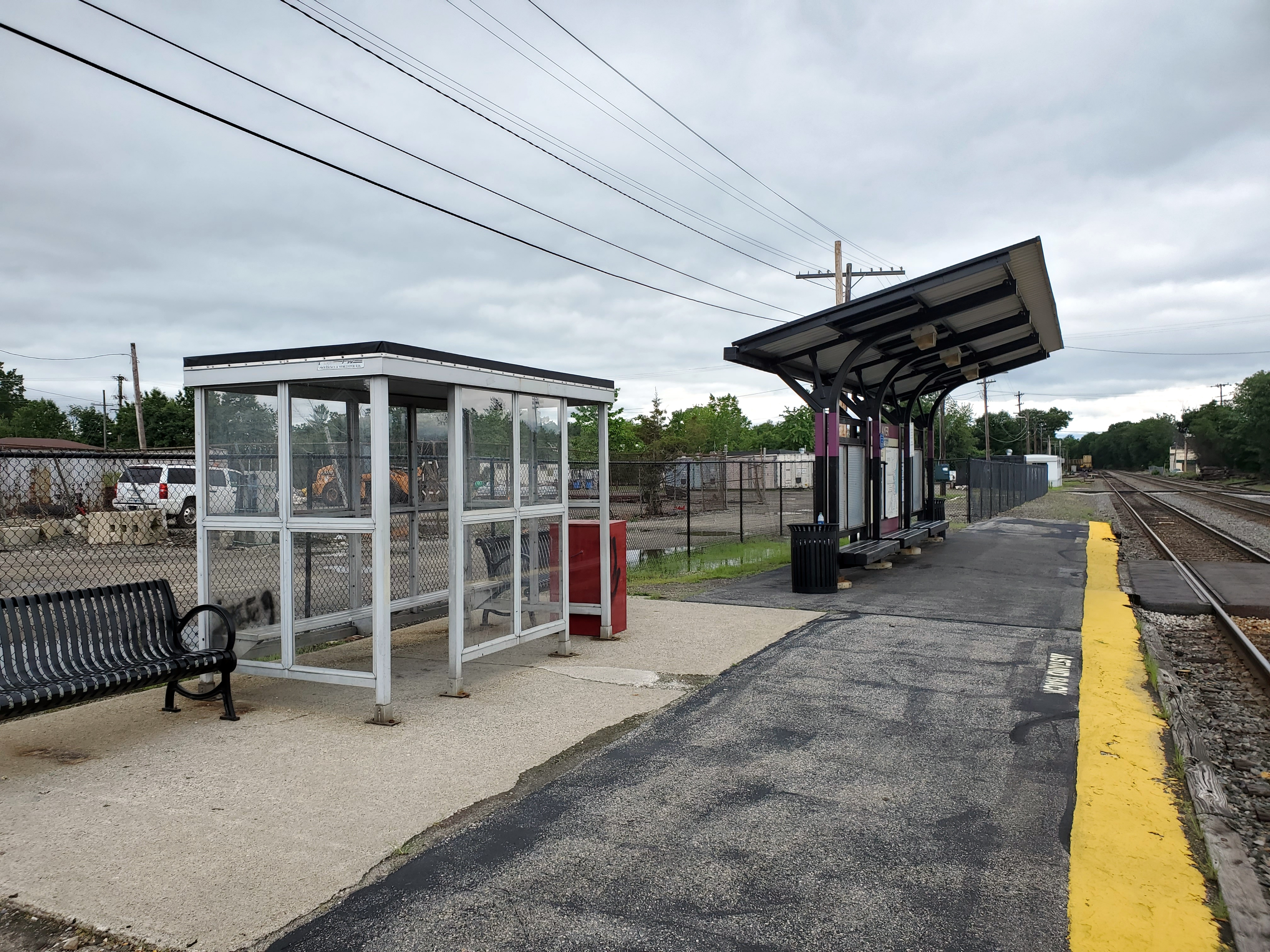
The 2003-built canopy and older bus-stop-style shelter

The B&M cut service back to West Concord on January 18, 1965 as part of its abandonment of commuter rail service outside the MBTA's funding district, but the MBTA established funding for restoration of service back to Ayer and intermediate stops effective June 28 of that year. The northern station building was demolished in 1967, with a USO office and a parking lot with no station facilities built in its place. A small "modern railway depot" – likely just a bus shelter – was built around 1970; it was a noncontributing property to the Historic District.

In December 1973, state subsidies for towns outside the MBTA funding district were halved, resulting in the MBTA needing to renegotiate subsidies from 14 municipalities. Ultimately Ayer, with just 14 daily commuters, refused to pay its $8200 bill in 1974; Littleton also did not reach an agreement. On March 1, 1975, the line was cut back to South Acton, dropping stops at Ayer, Littleton, and West Acton.

On December 27, 1976, the MBTA bought the B&M's northside commuter rail assets, including the entire length of the Fitchburg Line. The closure of the Lexington Branch the next month represented the limit of the contraction of the northside lines; as a result of the 1970s energy crisis and especially the 1979 energy crisis, a period of rapid expansion began in the end of the 1970s. Service to Ayer returned along with an extension to Gardner on January 13, 1980. Ayer has seen continuous MBTA service since 1980, although service beyond Ayer was cut from Gardner to Fitchburg at the end of 1986. The W&N just north of Ayer was finally abandoned in 1982, and turned into the Nashua River Rail Trail.

The MBTA installed platforms with yellow edge strips for the 1980 return of service. A metal shelter on the inbound platform was added in 2003. No major upgrades to the station were made as part of the Fitchburg Line Improvement Project, though a 2005 report proposed combining Ayer and Shirley into a Devens station with additional parking capacity. The plan was unpopular with local residents, who preferred the stations close to the town centers, and the MBTA dropped the consolidation plan.

=== Parking issues ===
Unlike all other stations on the line from Lincoln west, Ayer had no dedicated station parking. The lots adjacent to the station were privately owned and served local businesses, but were often illegally used by commuters using the station. The 30-space Nashua River Rail Trail parking lot was available for commuters on weekdays; some commuters also used street parking and other business lots. In 2003, the town and the Montachusett Regional Transit Authority (MART) began planning how to increase parking capacity. Five studies in six years concluded with plans for an $11 million, 400-space garage off Park Street, accessibility improvements to the station, and streetscape improvements for pedestrian access. The plans were reduced in scale due to traffic concerns and other issues. $3.2 million in FTA funds (originally intended for expanded parking at Littleton/Route 495 station but later rejected) was committed to build a $4 million surface lot. However, the lot was delayed due to conflicts with businesses that would be displaced and the lack of a publicly owned pedestrian entrance (a requirement to use the federal funds).

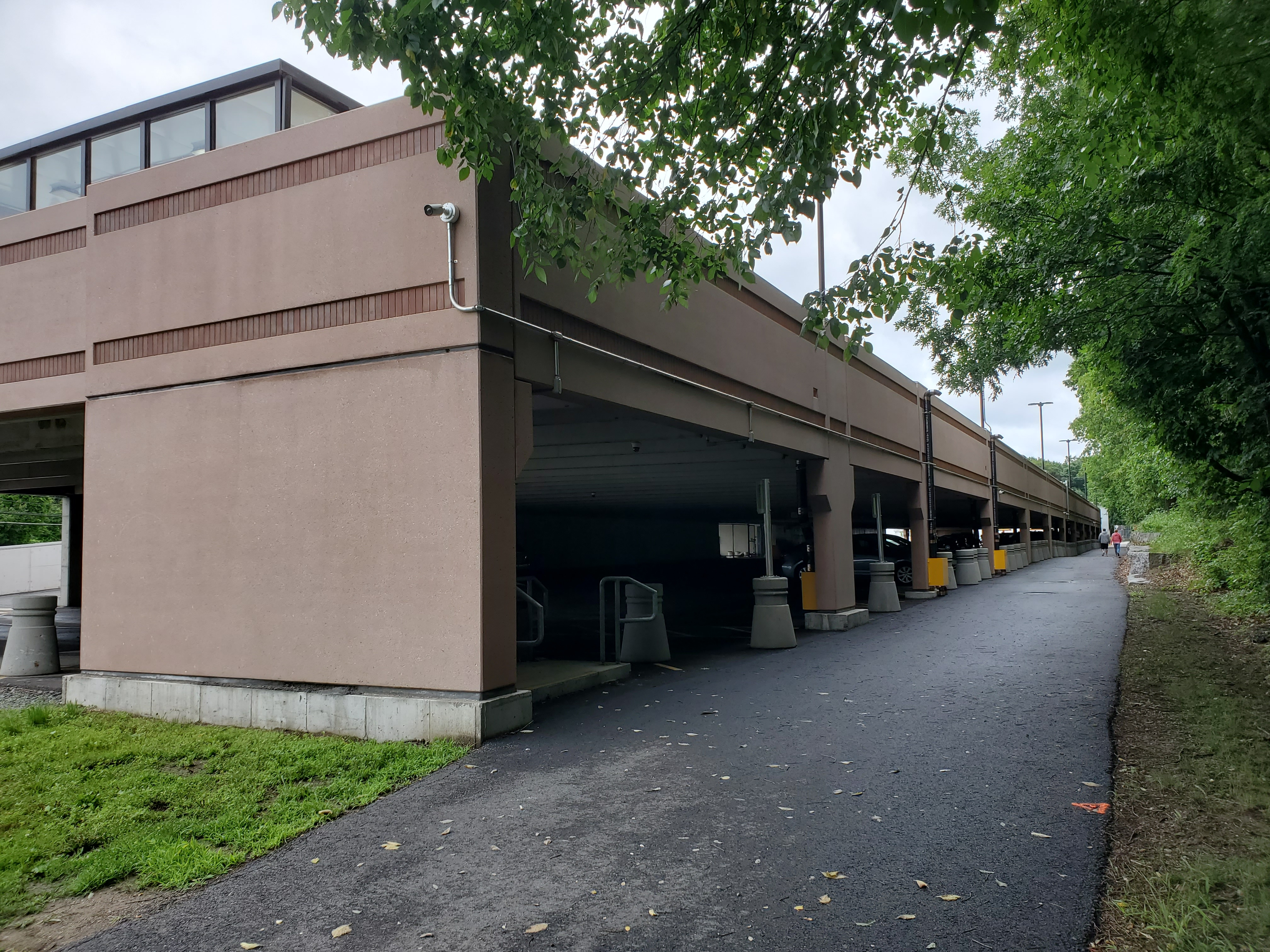
The garage and the Nashua River Rail Trail in 2021

On April 28, 2014, pedestrian access to the station was partially cut off when the abutting landowner erected a fence on the station's primary access point, forcing riders to walk a short distance along the tracks to a different business lot, in an effort to stop commuters from parking on his business lots. He removed a section of the fence for platform access after meeting with the MBTA, but disputed whether he was required to provide access and station facilities according to the terms of the 1960 land sale. Despite intervention by state legislators and a postcard campaign by residents, an agreement was not reached in 2014. In December 2014, the MBTA rejected a plan that would have created a pedestrian access path and a vehicle dropoff lane, alleging that the landowner had unfairly shifted property lines.

In February 2015, the landowner again blocked station access due to commuters parking on his property after a series of snowstorms. When an agreement had not been reached by March, the MBTA prepared to take the issue to land court. In April 2016, with negotiations between the three parties seemingly at a standstill, the Ayer selectmen voted to begin the eminent domain process, which then went before public vote at a town warrant meeting in May. The public vote had two sections — one for just the access route, and one for the commercial property (the 1960s-built USO building) as well. Because of the delays, the federal funding for the project could have been jeopardized regardless of the vote. The vote was "overwhelmingly" in favor of taking the whole property, valued at $595,000. On June 2, 2016, the town took ownership of the access route and building. In November 2016, MART agreed to pay for the demolition of the USO building; the town paid relocation costs for the two tenants.

In 2017, plans were changed to again include a $4.2 million, 180-space garage. A construction contract for the parking structure was issued in January 2019, and construction began with the closure of the rail trail lot that April. The garage opened on December 9, 2019. An accessible sidewalk, kiss-and-ride lane / bus loop, and the Depot Square park were constructed next to the station in 2020–21 at the former USO building site. The project did not include renovations to make the station itself accessible, which would have substantially increased the project cost. However, with the parking issues settled and the accessible entry point in place, Ayer became eligible for a future reconstruction. In May 2024, the MBTA listed Ayer as one of seven stations that would require "complex solutions" to be made accessible.
