= North Leominster station =

Railroad station in Leominster, Massachusetts, US

North Leominster
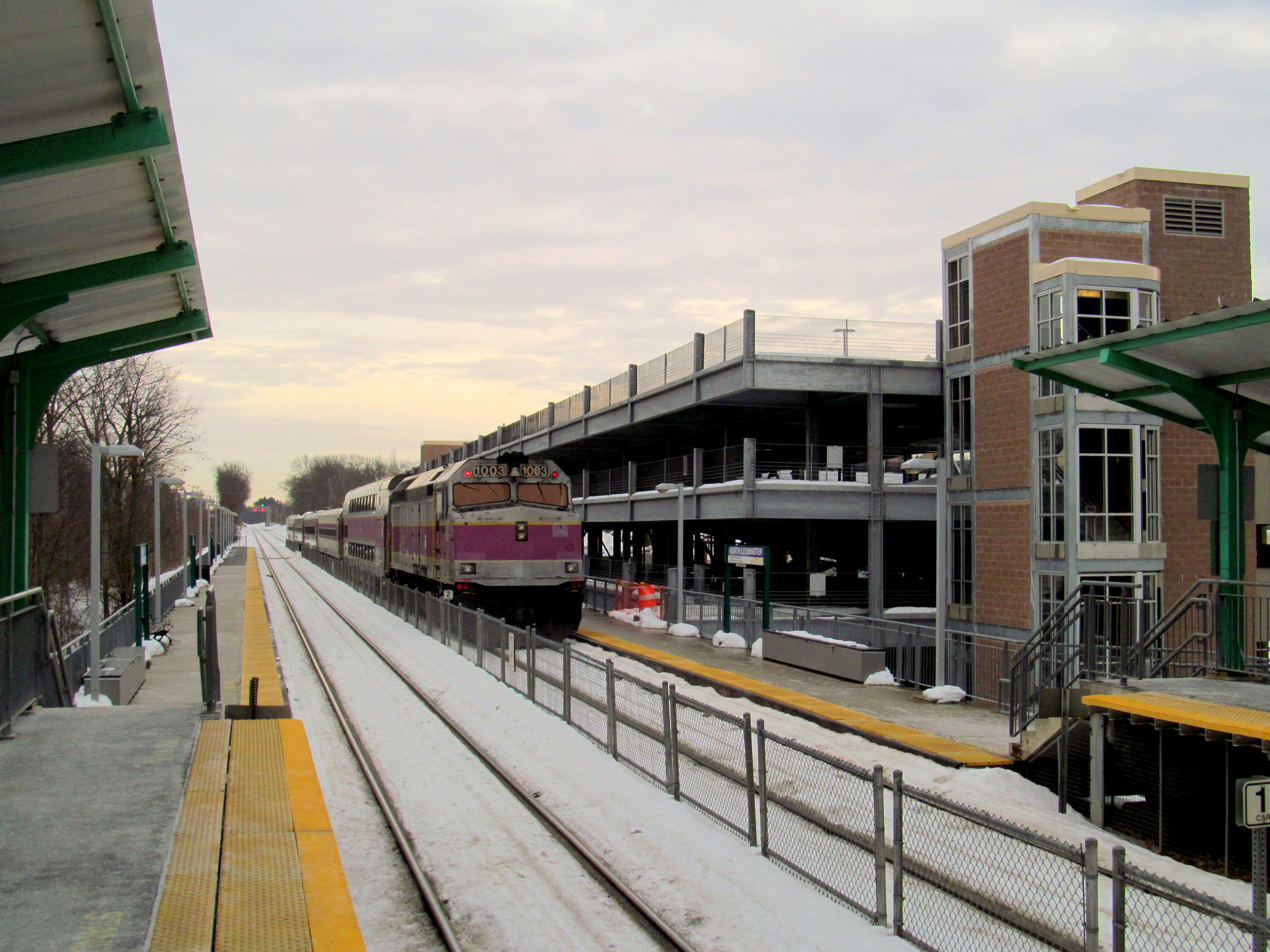
- An inbound train at North Leominster in December 2013

General information
- Location: 34 Nashua Street; Leominster, Massachusetts
- Coordinates: 42.5392°N 71.7393°W
- Line: Fitchburg Route
- Platforms: 2 side platforms
- Tracks: 2
- Connections: MART: 1, 3

Construction
- Parking: 436 spaces
- Accessible: Yes

Other information
- Fare zone: 8

History
- Opened: 1845; January 13, 1980
- Closed: January 18, 1965
- Rebuilt: October 4, 2004; May 20, 2014

Passengers
- 2024: 146 daily boardings

Services
Preceding station	MBTA	Following station
Fitchburg toward Wachusett	Fitchburg Line	Shirley toward North Station
Former services
Preceding station	Boston and Maine Railroad	Following station
Fitchburg toward Troy	Boston – Troy	Shirley toward Boston
Location

North Leominster station is an MBTA Commuter Rail station in Leominster, Massachusetts. It serves the Fitchburg Line. It is located at 34 Nashua Street, east of Main Street. The station, which is accessible, has two side platforms to serve the line's two tracks (the outbound platform is only able to be reached by crossing the tracks from the inbound platform). There is a small freight yard adjacent to the parking lot and mainline tracks on the south end of the inbound platform. A garage opened in 2014 to nearly triple parking capacity at the station, which serves as a park-and-ride stop for Route 2 and I-190, to a total of 436 spaces.

== History ==
=== Early history ===
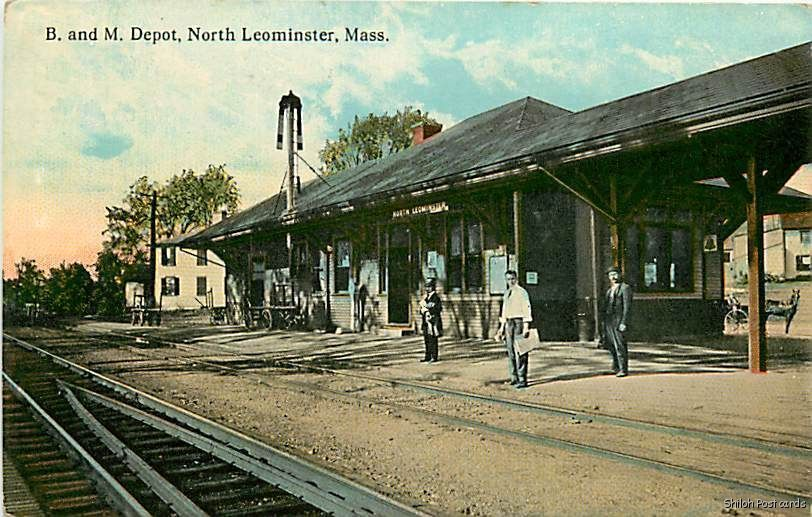
Original station building on a 1915 postcard

The Fitchburg Railroad opened through North Leominster in 1845. Leominster – later North Leominster – was opened by 1858. It was just north of the Main Street crossing, near the modern station location.

Trains ran to North Leominster for over a century under the Fitchburg Railroad and the Boston and Maine Railroad until the latter cut all service on the line past West Concord on January 18, 1965 due to insufficient subsidies from the newly formed Massachusetts Bay Transportation Authority. The station building was reused as a foreign car agency by 1968, but later demolished.

=== Service restoration ===
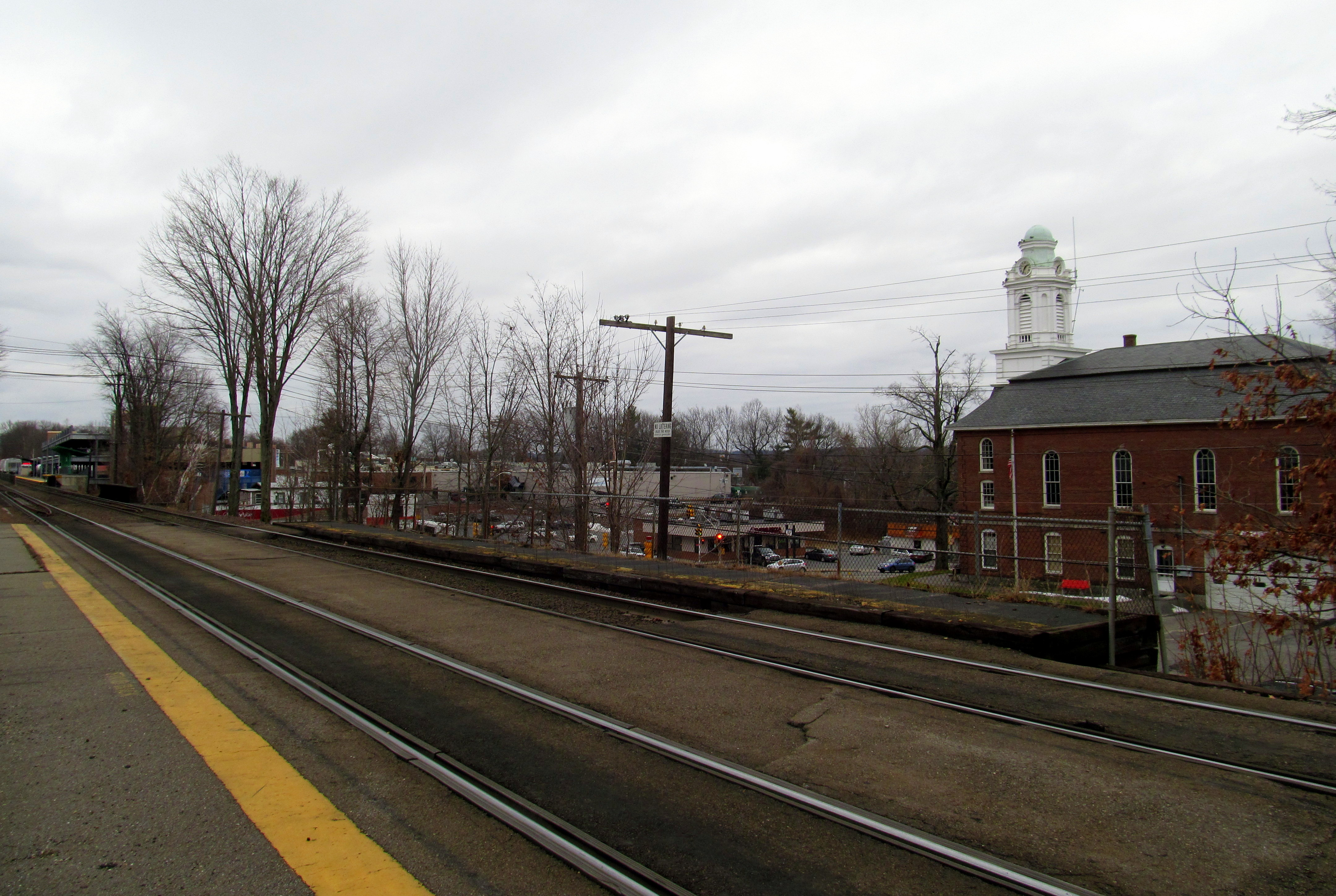
1980-built low platforms, photographed in 2014

On January 13, 1980, the MBTA restored service on 37 miles of the Fitchburg Line from West Concord to Gardner, including the stop at North Leominster. Short asphalt platforms were built behind a strip mall at the location of the former depot, with pedestrian access from Main Street but only 30 parking spaces.

In July 2003, the MBTA Board approved spending $950,000 in MBTA funds for a $3 million new station. On October 4, 2004, the new station was opened about 600 feet (180 m) southeast of the old station. It was built with short high-level platforms for handicapped accessibility, and a 150-space parking lot was built off Nashua Street adjacent to the station. The former station platforms are still extant.

However, the lot quickly proved to be too small, as North Leominster serves park-and-ride commuters from as far as Orange and Athol. (Fitchburg, the other major park-and-ride on the outer end of the Fitchburg Line, does not have convenient access to Route 2 and I-190 as North Leominster does.)

=== Garage ===
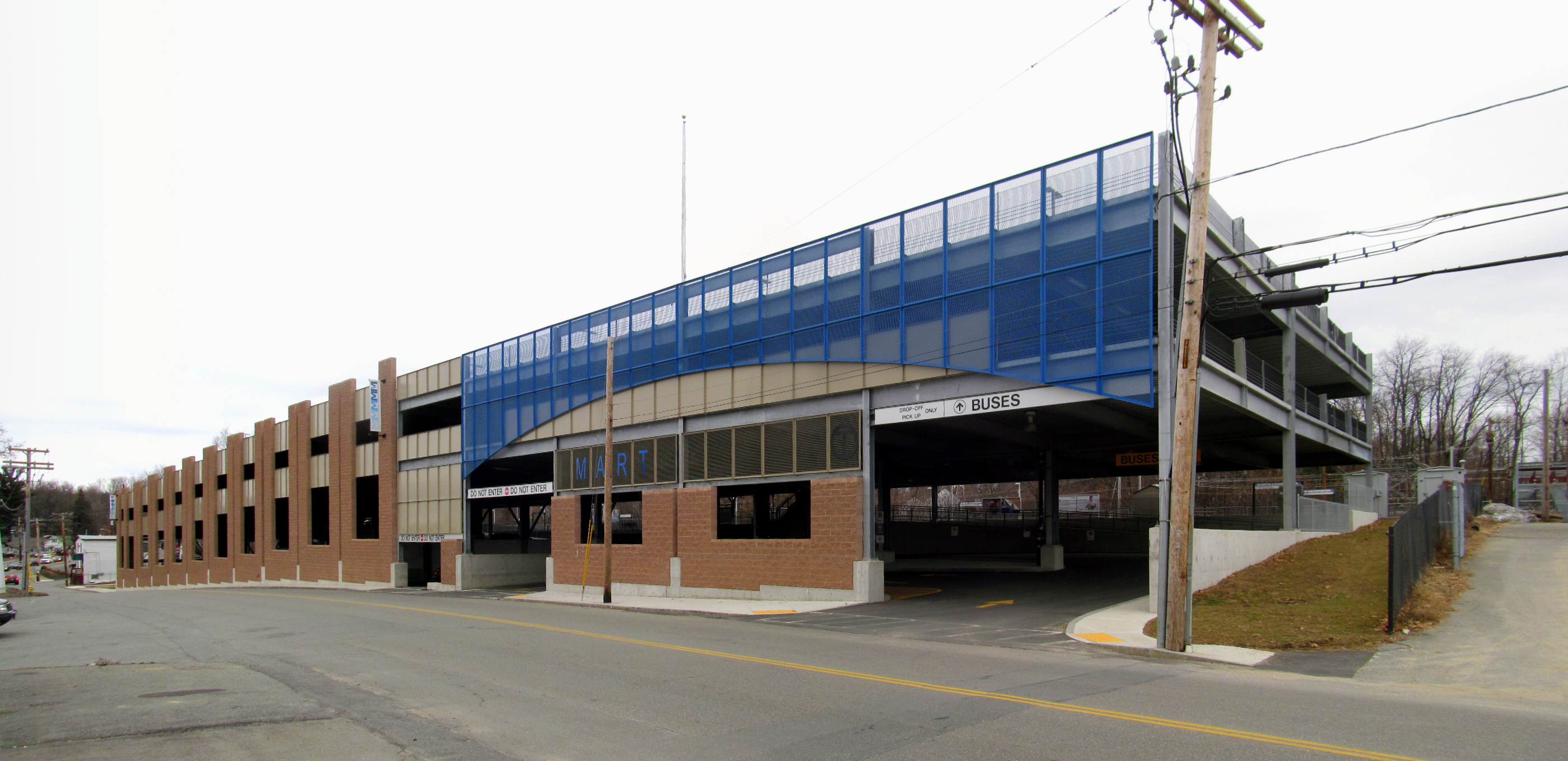
The completed garage in December 2014

Beginning in 2007, the Montachusett Regional Transit Authority and Montachusett Regional Planning Commission began planning for an expansion of parking capacity. Construction began in March 2012 on a three-story garage which will provide 340 parking spaces. The $7.7 million project, which was funded by the FTA through earmarks and formula funding, includes a covered busway and charging stations for electric cars. Originally to be completed in August 2013, the garage was delayed due to high summer heat which prevented pouring concrete. The garage was dedicated on November 1, 2013, but it was not yet completed. After five months of delays caused by the contractor's financial problems, the garage opened on May 20, 2014.

Construction of full-length high-level accessible platforms was considered as part of the project, but the platforms would have cost an additional $18 million and created clearance issues with passing Pan Am freight trains. The freight trains, which are slightly wider than standard passenger cars, frequently impact the mini-high platforms and would cause severe damage to full-length platforms.

On September 11, 2023, flash floods in Leominster washed out an embankment at the former North Leominster station site. Service between Shirley and Wachusett was replaced with buses until September 19.

=== Other stations ===
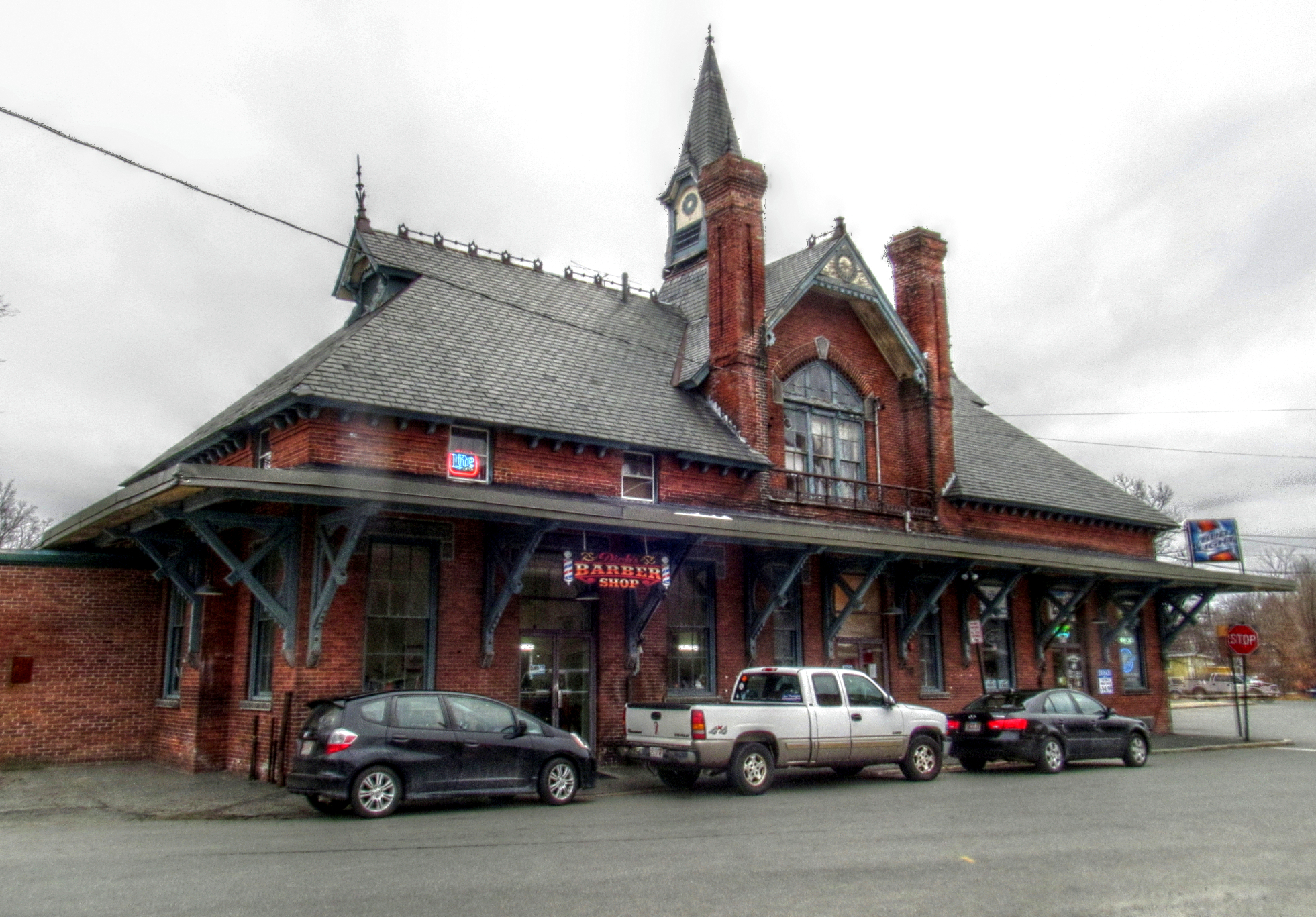
Leominster Center station building in 2014

Besides the Fitchburg Line station, Leominster also once had two other train stations. The Fitchburg and Worcester Railroad opened in 1850 between the eponymous cities, with a station stop in Leominster Center as well as West Leominster (at Hamilton Avenue). Through service from Worcester to Fitchburg ended in 1926, and the last passenger service through Leominster Center ended in 1931. The line is now used for freight service from the south but is abandoned north of Mechanic Street in downtown Leominster. The 1878 Leominster Center station still stands at 24 Columbia Street.
