= Ayer Main Street Historic District =

Historic district in Massachusetts, United States

- U.S. National Register of Historic Places
- U.S. Historic district
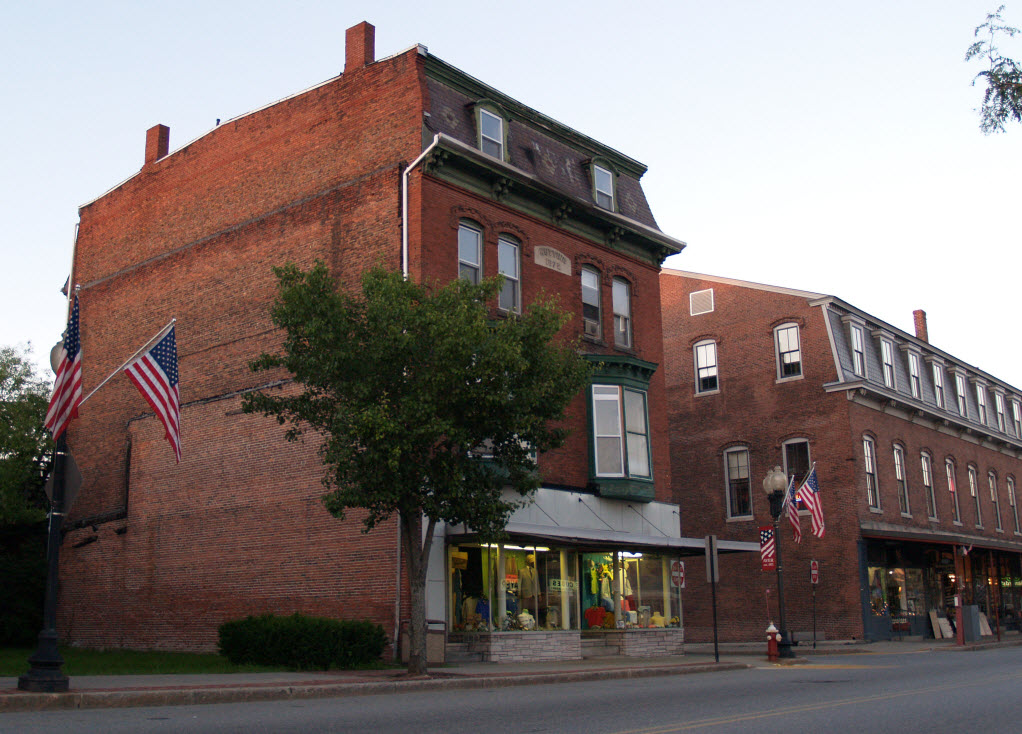

- Location within Massachusetts Location within the United States
- Location: Ayer, Massachusetts
- Coordinates: 42°33′34″N 71°35′20″W
- Built: 1872
- Architectural style: Mid 19th Century Revival, Second Empire, Italianate
- NRHP reference No.: 88000193
- Added to NRHP: March 16, 1989

The Ayer Main Street Historic District encompasses most of the historic central business district of Ayer, Massachusetts. It extends along Main Street between Park and Columbia Streets, and was mostly developed between 1872 and 1898 as a hub of railroad and roadway-based economic activity. The district was listed on the National Register of Historic Places in 1989.

== Description and history ==
The town of Ayer, although not incorporated until 1871, became an important railroad hub in the 1840s, with the completion of both north–south and east–west railroad routes that crossed just southwest of the present downtown area. During the American Civil War, a military camp was established to the south (later to become Fort Devens). The downtown area began to develop most significantly after incorporation in 1871 and a fire in 1872 that destroyed many earlier structures. The north side of Main Street, opposite the rail yards of the junction, is where this new commercial development was focused.

The historic district covers four blocks of buildings on both sides of Main Street, extending from Pleasant Street in the west to Columbia Street in the east, including also the former railroad depot building that stands just south of Main Street parallel to the east–west tracks. Most of the buildings are built of brick and stone, although there are three wood-frame structures. The district's oldest building is one of these: built in 1868, it was originally located south of the tracks, and was moved to its present location opposite Pleasant Street in 1878. Ayer Town Hall stands near the eastern end of the district; it is a fine example of high-style Victorian Gothic architecture.

== See also ==
- National Register of Historic Places listings in Middlesex County, Massachusetts
