= Nashua River Rail Trail =

American mixed-use rail trail

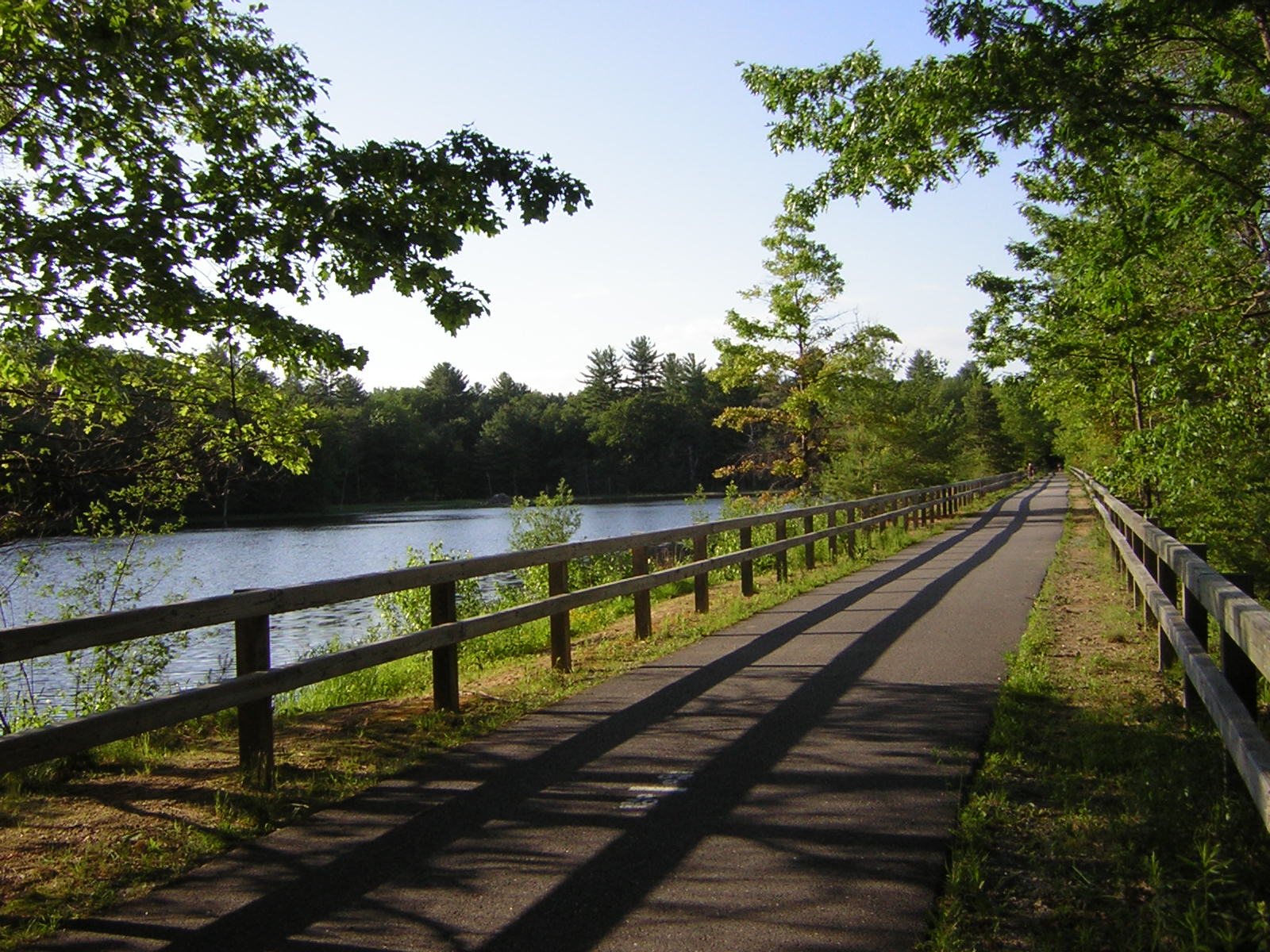
- The Nashua River Rail Trail at the Groton School Pond in Groton, MA
- Length: 12.5 mi (20.1 km)
- Location: Middlesex County, Massachusetts; Hillsborough County, New Hampshire
- Designation: Massachusetts state park
- Trailheads: Park St. and Main St., Ayer, Massachusetts (42°33′36″N 71°35′23″W); Gilson Rd. at Country Side Dr., Nashua, New Hampshire (42°42′57″N 71°31′55″W)
- Use: Bicycling, inline skating, walking, horseback riding, cross-country skiing
- Right of way: Former railroad line
- Maintained by: Department of Conservation and Recreation
- Website: Nashua River Rail Trail Location of trailheads in New Hampshire and Massachusetts

The Nashua River Rail Trail is a 12.5-mile (20.1 km) paved mixed-use rail trail in northern Massachusetts and southern New Hampshire under control of the Massachusetts Department of Conservation and Recreation (DCR). It roughly follows the course of the Nashua River, passing through the towns of Ayer, Groton, Pepperell, and Dunstable, Massachusetts and ends about a mile across the New Hampshire state border in Nashua, New Hampshire. The trail is used by walkers, cyclists, inline skaters, equestrians, and cross-country skiers.

== History ==
Ayer was a major junction for both north–south and east–west rail lines during the rapid development of railroad transportation. The Nashua River Rail Trail sits on the former Hollis branch of the Boston and Maine Railroad, which follows an old Nashaway Indian trail. The line was originally part of the Worcester & Nashua Railroad that connected Worcester, Massachusetts and Nashua, New Hampshire, which was opened on July 3, 1848. The line was extended to Portland, Maine in 1874 and it became part of the Worcester, Nashua and Rochester Railroad connecting Worcester and points east to Canada's Grand Trunk Railroad via Portland, Maine.

The Boston & Maine Railroad took over the line in 1886 and called it the Worcester, Nashua & Portland (WN&P) Division. Between 1911 and 1912, a second track was added from Worcester to Nashua.

Passenger service on the line ended in 1934. After World War II, with the gradual decline of rail transportation, the line fell into disuse, and the last freight train ran on the line in 1982. Some concrete signal bases can still be seen, and railroad plates and ties can be found buried under the sand.

The DCR bought the Hollis Branch in 1987, and the trail was paved by Mass Highway between 2001 and 2002. The official opening and dedication was on October 25, 2002.

== Features ==
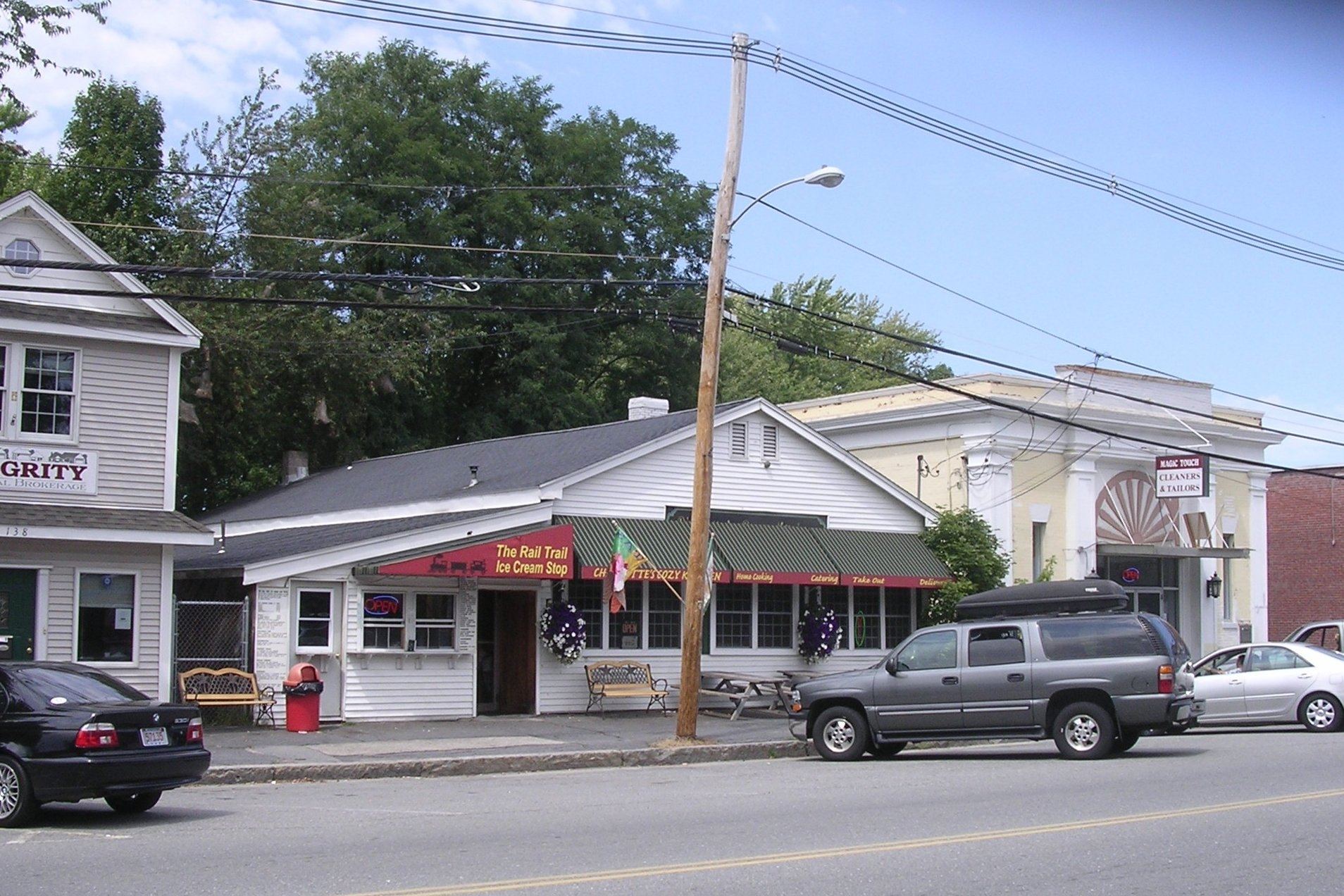
Pepperell businesses along the Rail Trail

The Nashua River Rail Trail travels along a flat and scenic landscape with many opportunities to see wildlife. The trail passes wetlands, ponds, woods, swamps, and farmland where a variety of wildlife can be viewed, such as beavers, herons and swans.

At the Ayer trailhead, which is close to the Ayer commuter rail station offering access to rail service between Boston and Fitchburg, there is a 60-space parking lot with non-flush public toilets. There are several other parking lots along the trail, which crosses many roads and bridges. Trail users can stop for refreshments in nearby Groton Center or at a restaurant and ice-cream stand in Pepperell.

Free parking is available in Pepperell where the trail crosses Massachusetts Route 113 and at the Nashua trailhead at Yudicky Park.

== See also ==
- List of rail trails
