= Pingryville, Massachusetts =

- Village
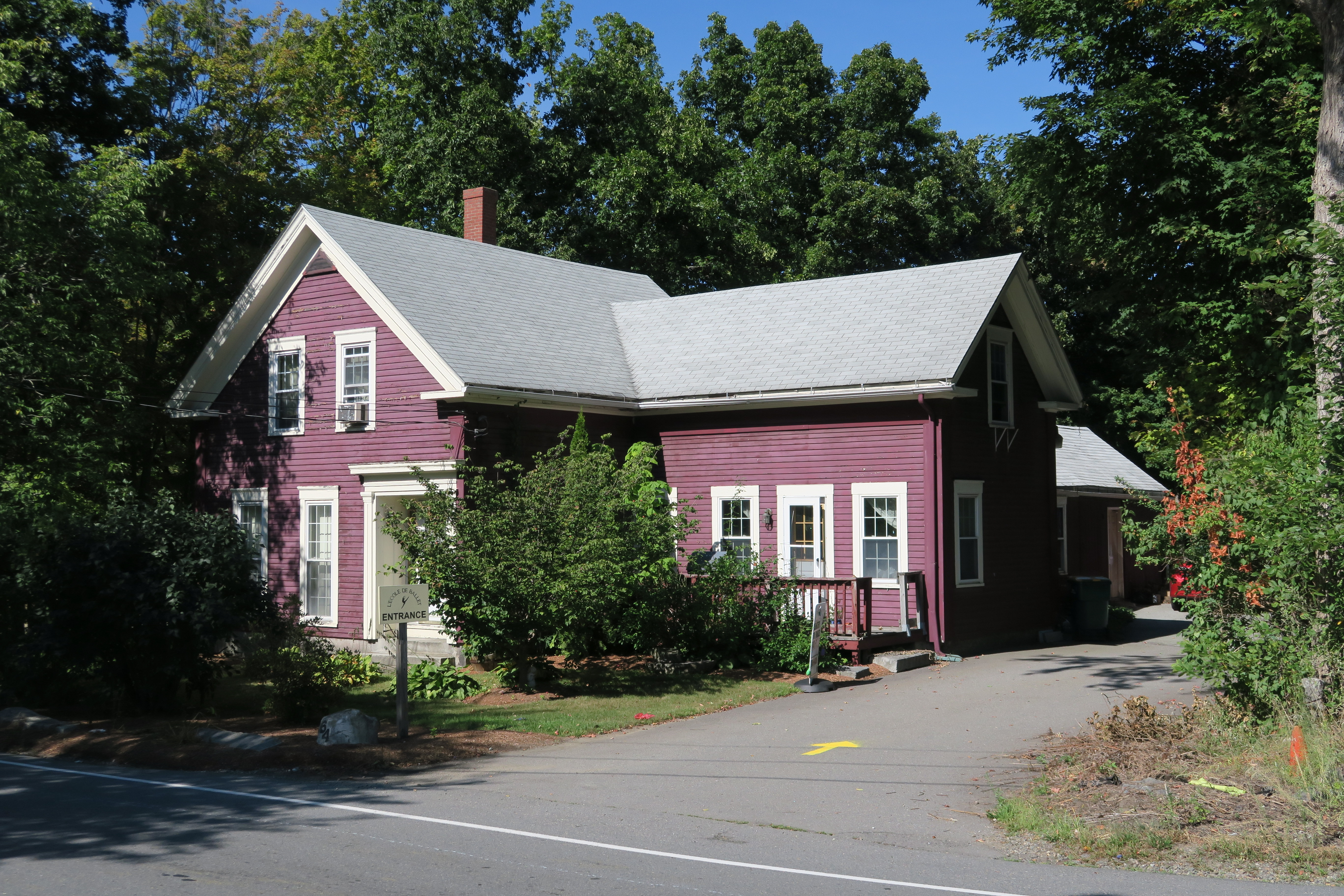
- L'Ecole de Ballet on Willow Road

- Location within Massachusetts Location within the United States
- Coordinates: 42°33′06″N 71°32′11″W
- Country: United States
- State: Massachusetts
- County: Middlesex
- Towns: Ayer, Littleton
- Elevation: 253 ft (77 m)
- Time zone: UTC-5 (Eastern (EST))
  - Summer (DST): UTC-4 (EDT)
- ZIP Code: 01460 (Littleton)
- Area codes: 978 & 351
- GNIS feature ID: 611156

Pingryville is a village in the towns of Ayer and Littleton, Middlesex County, Massachusetts, United States. Massachusetts Route 2A and Massachusetts Route 110 pass through the community. It is named after John Pingry (1799-1860) who was a local farmer and deacon of the church.

The community was mentioned in the song "Massachusetts" by Norwegian comedy duo Ylvis.
