= Gardner station =

Former train station in Massachusetts

Gardner
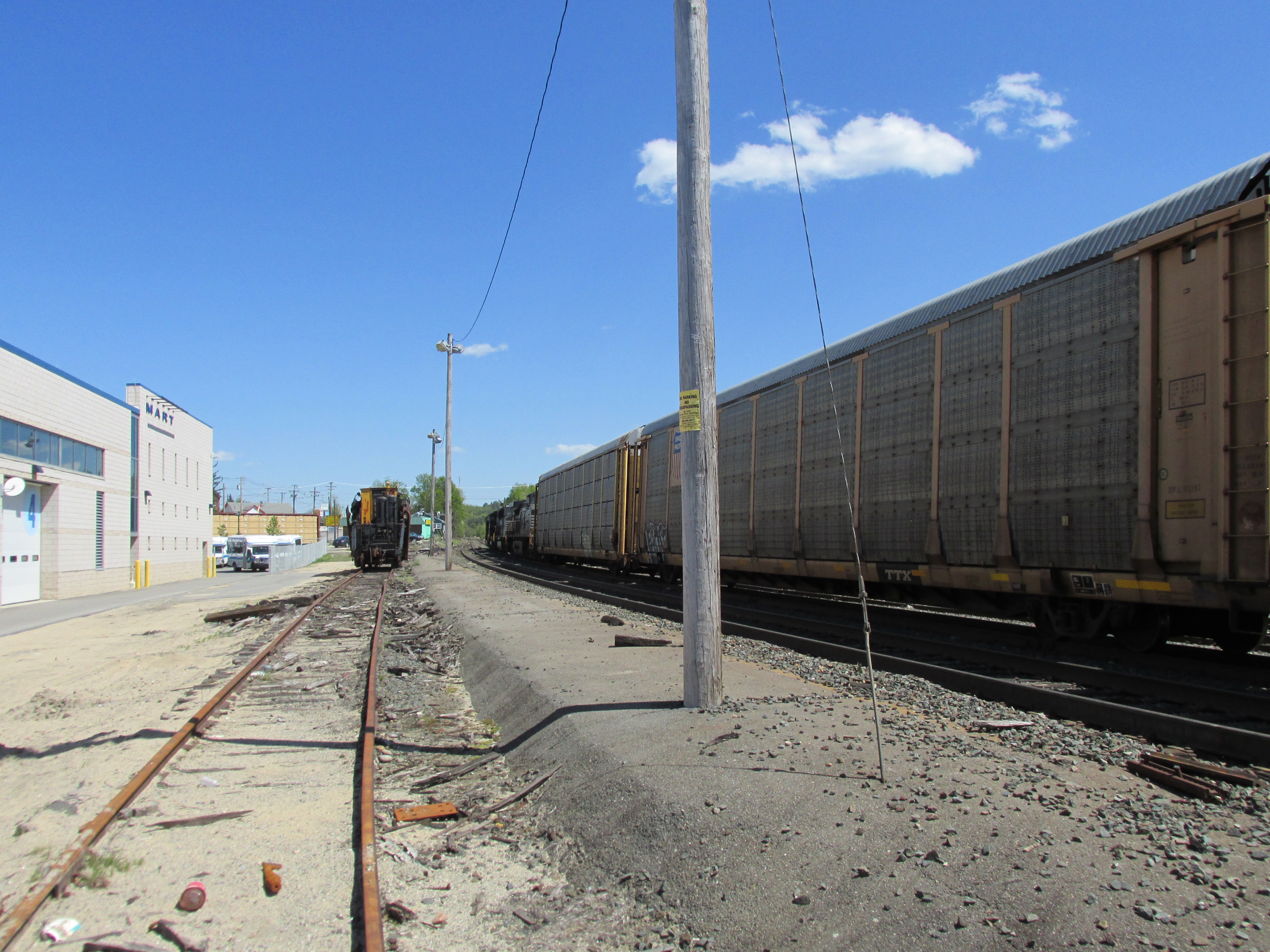
- Abandoned platform at Gardner in May 2013

General information
- Location: Main Street, Gardner, Massachusetts
- Coordinates: 42.5675°N 71.9848°W
- Line: Pan Am Southern Freight Main Line
- Platforms: 1 island platform (1980s station)
- Tracks: 7 (shared with freight; only 2 tracks served the platform)
- Connections: MART: Gardner Route 1, Gardner Route 2, G-Link Gardner-Orange, G-Link Gardner-Winchendon, MWCC Commuter Rail/Intercity

History
- Opened: 1851 (original); January 13, 1980 (later)
- Closed: 1960 (original); December 31, 1986 (later)

Passengers
- 1983: 24 daily

Former services
Preceding station	MBTA	Following station
Terminus	Fitchburg Line	Fitchburg toward North Station
Preceding station	Boston and Maine Railroad	Following station
Otter River toward Troy	Boston – Troy	East Gardner toward Boston
Heywood toward Winchendon	Boston – Winchendon	Hubbardston toward Worcester
Location

Gardner station is a former train station located in Gardner, Massachusetts. Passenger service to Union Station ran from 1851 until 1960, and MBTA Commuter Rail Fitchburg Line service also briefly ran from 1980 to 1986. Restoration of passenger service was considered in the early 2000s, but was rejected due to low cost-effectiveness.

== History ==
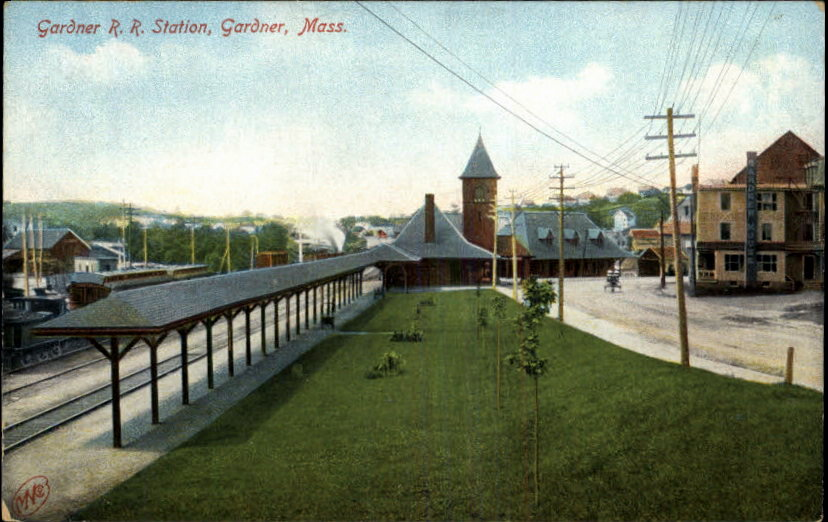
Union Station in 1910

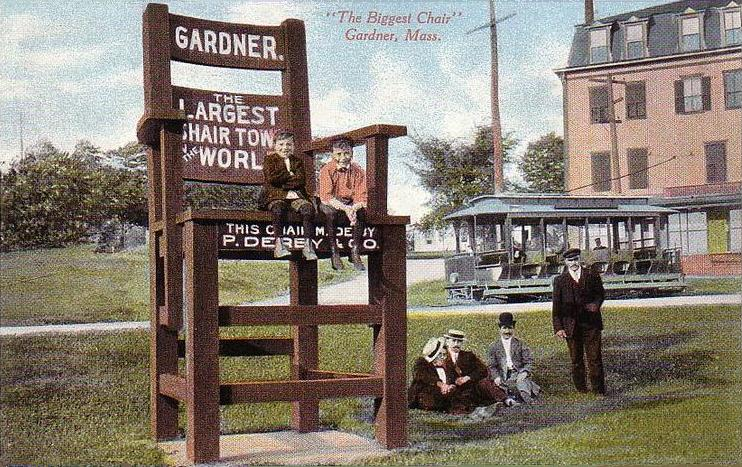
The "Biggest Chair" at Gardner station around 1910

Gardner gained train service on the Fitchburg Railroad (via the Vermont & Massachusetts) in 1851. Located at the intersection of the Fitchburg Railroad with the Boston, Barre and Gardner Railroad (which began service to Worcester in 1871), Gardner once had a large union station which was angled to serve both lines. The Fitchburg bought the BB&G in 1885, and was itself bought by the Boston and Maine Railroad in 1900. The "Biggest Chair", a 12-foot-tall chair made by a local company, was placed in the station lawn around 1910. Passenger service to Worcester ended in March 1953, and service to Boston ended in 1960 when the B&M discontinued all trains west of Fitchburg, ending more than a century of rail service. Union Station was demolished soon after.

On December 27, 1976, the MBTA bought the Boston and Maine Railroad's northside commuter rail assets, including the entire length of the Fitchburg Line. The closure of the Lexington Branch the next month represented the limit of the contraction of the northside lines; as a result of the 1970s energy crisis and especially the 1979 energy crisis, a period of rapid expansion began in the end of the 1970s. On January 13, 1980, the MBTA extended commuter service on the Fitchburg Line from South Acton, with two round trips extended as far as Gardner. Trains did not stop at the former Union Station site, but instead at a narrow asphalt platform in the freight yard just to the west off Main Street. Service to Gardner ended at the end of 1986 due to a dispute between the MBTA, Amtrak (who ran the trains), and Guilford Transportation (who owned the tracks between Fitchburg and Gardner) over track ownership. The MBTA contracted with Wilson Bus Lines to run Gardner-Fitchburg connecting service until June 1993, when the Montachusett Regional Transit Authority took over the route as a local service.

=== Proposed restoration ===
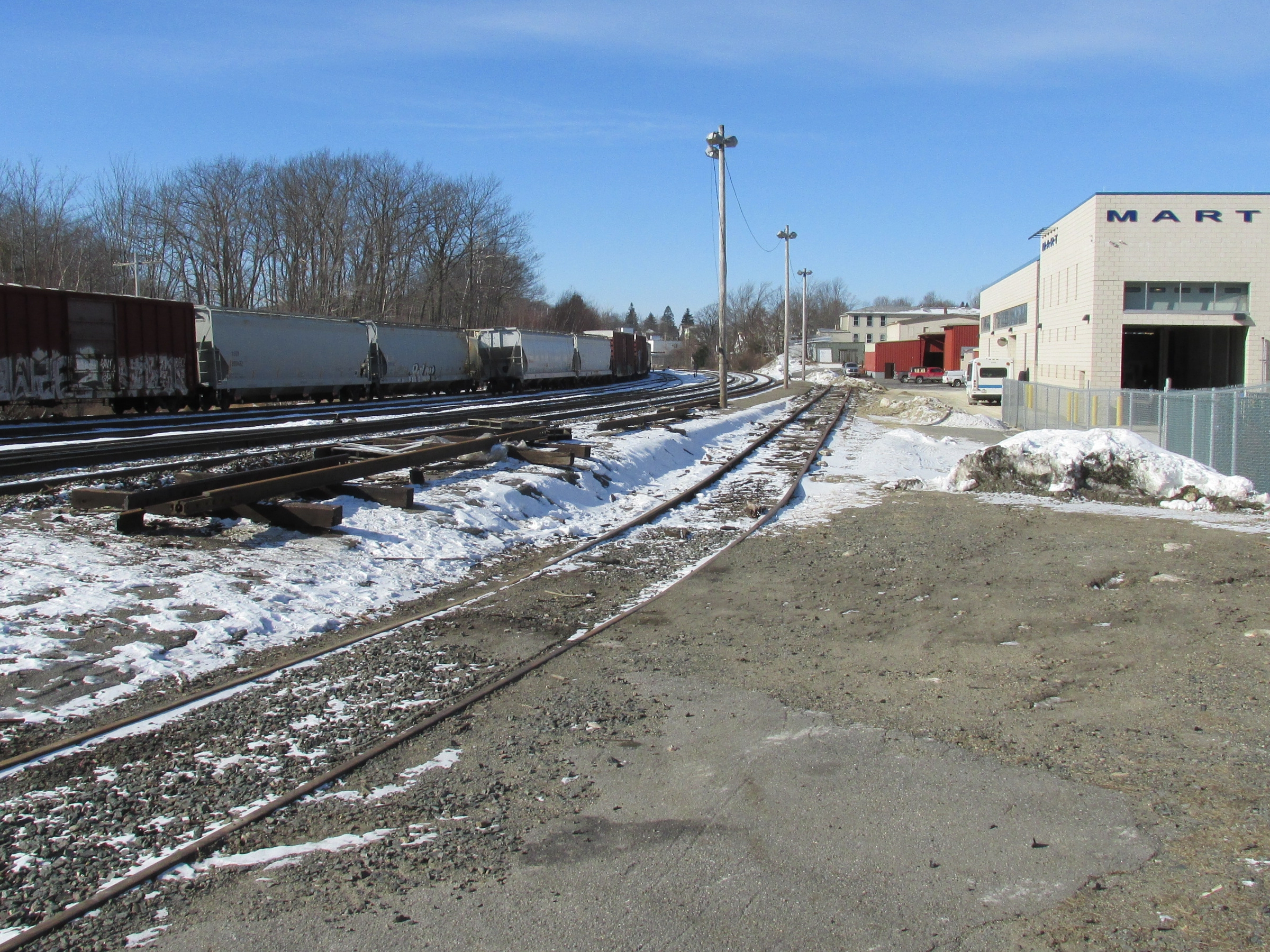
Old platform (in background) next to the newer MART garage

Restoring commuter rail service to Gardner has been considered since 1987. In 2000, the Massachusetts State Legislature passed a bill that directed the MBTA to "conduct a feasibility study regarding the reestablishment of the commuter rail line to the cities of Gardner and Athol on the existing Fitchburg/Gardner/Athol spur line" as one of many expansion and improvement projects. However, restoration of service was deemed impractical for several reasons. Gardner is 64 miles and Athol 81 miles by rail for North Station - outside normal commuting distances. The line between Fitchburg and Gardner would cost $104.2 million to double track, and speeds are limited due to the grades going through the Mount Wachusett range. Because the Route 2 expressway is faster along the corridor than rail service would be, the expansion was projected to attract just 50 riders per day. (Ridership at the former station was just 24 riders per day in 1983 - the lowest among regular stops on the system.) Instead, it was decided to extend the Fitchburg Line 4.5 miles to a new station at Wachusett, which opened in September 2016 with a park-and-ride lot off Route 2 expected to attract 400 riders per day.

The 1980s platform still exists; it became overgrown for a time but was later cleared off for freight yard access. Beginning in 2007, MART built a new bus garage on the site of the former freight house, which burned in 2002. An MBTA "T" roundel sign, which had remained for two decades after the end of service, was removed during construction. The new garage includes provisions for a platform should rail service ever return.

== Bus connections ==
Even without rail service, Gardner serves as a hub for MART bus service. Two local routes, two interurban routes with local stops, and one intercity route operate from Gardner:

- Gardner Route 1
- Gardner Route 2
- G-Link Gardner-Orange
- G-Link Gardner-Winchendon
- MWCC Commuter Rail/Intercity (runs to Fitchburg station to connect with commuter rail)

MART also offers direct service from Gardner to Wachusett.
