= Belmont Community Path =

Planned shared-use rail trail in Belmont, Massachusetts

- The Clark Street Pedestrian Bridge over the Fitchburg Line tracks. Future trailhead of both phases of the Belmont Community Path
- Length: 2.1 miles (3.4 km) planned (plus 0.18 miles (0.29 km) connector with tunnel)
- Location: Belmont, Massachusetts
- Began construction: 2027 (Phase 1 scheduled)
- Trailheads: Fitchburg Cutoff Path (eastern terminus); Clark Street Bridge (Phase 1/Phase 2 boundary); Waltham city line at Beaver Brook Reservation (planned western terminus)
- Use: Hiking, bicycling, inline skating, wheelchairs, strollers
- Difficulty: Easy
- Season: Year-round
- Surface: Paved (planned)
- Right of way: MBTA Fitchburg Line, former Massachusetts Central Railroad
- Maintainer: Town of Belmont
- Website: Phase 1 website Phase 2 website

Trail map
- Planned route of the Belmont Community Path; Orange: Phase 1 (bid advertised); Purple: Phase 2 (in design)

The Belmont Community Path (BCP) is a partially funded, planned 2.1-mile (3.4 km) shared-use rail with trail in Belmont, Massachusetts. Designed to run parallel to the active Massachusetts Bay Transportation Authority (MBTA) Fitchburg Line and largely within the right-of-way (ROW) of the former Massachusetts Central Railroad, the path serves as a major Greater Boston link in the Mass Central Rail Trail (MCRT) between Northampton and Boston.

The project is divided into two main construction phases. Phase 1 consists of a 1.11-mile (1.79 km) east–west path from the Fitchburg Cutoff Path at Brighton Street through Belmont Center to the Clark Street Pedestrian Bridge, with a 0.18-mile (0.29 km) connector north–south, including a tunnel underneath the Fitchburg Line tracks between Alexander Avenue and the Belmont Middle and High School campus. Phase 2 is an approximately 1.0-mile (1.6 km) extension running west from the Clark Street Bridge through Waverley Square to Beaver Brook Reservation at the Waltham border. Construction of Phase 1 is scheduled to take place from 2027 to mid-2029, while Phase 2 remains in design.

== Trail overview ==
The Belmont Community Path is designed as an ADA-accessible, off-road linear park and active transportation corridor serving commuters, students, and recreational users. Because the trail runs parallel to active commuter and occasional freight rail service on the MBTA Fitchburg Line, it is an example of rails with trails infrastructure. Along most of its length, the path is designed to be 12 to 16 feet (3.7 to 4.9 m) wide with 2 to 4 feet (0.6 to 1.2 m) grass or vegetated shoulders, narrowing to 10 feet (3.0 m) in constrained locations such as Belmont Center station and the Alexander Avenue underpass. Continuous black steel picket fencing separates the trail from the active railroad tracks.

=== Trail segments ===
Belmont Community Path segments (east to west)
Segment	Endpoints	Length	Surface	Status	Projected opening
Phase 1	Fitchburg Cutoff Path at Brighton Street to Clark Street Bridge	1.11 miles (1.79 km)	Paved	Bid advertised (construction 2027–2029)	2029
↳ North-south connector with tunnel	Alexander Avenue to Concord Avenue at Belmont High School	0.18 miles (0.29 km)	Paved	Bid advertised (construction 2027–2029)	2029
Phase 2	Clark Street Bridge to Waltham city line at Beaver Brook Reservation	1.0 mile (1.6 km)	Paved	In design	TBD

=== Phase 1: Fitchburg Cutoff Path to Clark Street Bridge ===
Phase 1 comprises two intersecting components:

- Fitchburg Cutoff Path to Clark Street Bridge: Beginning at the western terminus of the Fitchburg Cutoff Path at Brighton Street near the Cambridge border, the 1.11-mile (1.79 km) mainline path crosses Brighton Street at an upgraded, fully actuated pedestrian and bicycle traffic signal coordinated with the railroad crossing gates. The path then proceeds west along the north side of the Fitchburg Line embankment behind residential properties on Channing Road. In this section, a 3,558.7-foot (1,085 m) parcel of former Central Massachusetts Railroad land donated by the Belmont Citizens Forum provides both trail right-of-way and a vegetated screening buffer for abutting backyards. Continuing west past Alexander Avenue, the trail passes the northern side of Belmont Center station and the historic 1907 granite arch railroad bridge over Leonard Street and Concord Avenue, where it connects to the existing pedestrian tunnel beneath the tracks to Belmont Center. West of the station, the path runs behind the former Belmont Municipal Light Department building, the Belmont Police Station, and Pleasant Street properties before reaching its western Phase 1 terminus at the wooden-decked Clark Street pedestrian bridge.
  - North-south High School connector with tunnel: At Alexander Avenue, a 0.18-mile (0.29 km) north–south spur branches off the mainline path to pass beneath the active Fitchburg Line tracks via a grade-separated precast concrete box tunnel equipped with interior lighting and a sump pump drainage system. The underpass links the Winn Brook neighborhood on the north side of the tracks directly to the Belmont Middle and High School campus on the south side, continuing along the eastern edge of Harris Field to a new actuated pedestrian and bicycle crossing at Concord Avenue.

Phase 1 construction also incorporates a network of drainage swales and sub-drains to mitigate stormwater runoff, along with extensive landscaping featuring 354 native and preferred trees—such as eastern white pine and pin oak—and 478 shrubs selected in consultation with abutters and the town's Shade Tree Committee. To protect the new plantings from aggressive invasive species colonizing the rail corridor, the MassDOT construction contract mandates a three-year Invasive Plant Management Strategy targeting Japanese knotweed, tree of heaven, and Norway maple.

The Clark Street Bridge in 1990.

The Clark Street Bridge in 2010.

The Clark Street Bridge, while serving as a traiIhead for both phases of the BCP, will not be modified for the path projects. The bridge was initially built in 1908 by Boston and Maine Railroad as a wood and iron modified howe truss. By 1990 it was closed to vehicular traffic, and it was replaced in 1992 as a pedestrian bridge, reduced to 6 feet (1.8 m) wide and 18 feet (5.5 m) above the MBTA tracks. A path must be at least 8 feet (2.4 m) wide for MassDOT trail funding. Modifying the bridge would likely result in loss of the bridge's grandfathered height clearance status with the MBTA, requiring a lift to the modern 22.5 feet (6.9 m) standard. It was estimated that both of these modifications would approach the cost of replacing the bridge entirely.

=== Phase 2: Clark Street Bridge to Waltham border ===
Phase 2 will extend the trail approximately 1.0 mile (1.6 km) west from the Clark Street Bridge through Waverley Square to the Waltham city line. Because the former Central Massachusetts Railroad corridor west of Clark Street was narrowed by the 1952 grade-separation depression of Waverley station and subsequent commercial parcel sales along Pleasant Street, route selection for Phase 2 required evaluating multiple alignments north and south of the tracks.

In May 2023, design consultants Pare Corporation and Toole Design Group recommended a preferred route that was unanimously endorsed by the town's Community Path Project Committee (CPPC). Under this alignment, the path runs west from the Clark Street Bridge along MBTA land on the north side of the tracks for roughly 600 feet (183 m) before crossing over the Fitchburg Line via a new pedestrian and bicycle bridge just east of 750 Pleasant Street. Landing on the south side of the tracks behind the Belmont Housing Authority headquarters at 59 Pearson Road, the route descends a ramp along the rear edge of the Belmont Village public housing complex toward the Belmont Department of Public Works Town Yard. A southern spur along the eastern border of the Town Yard and Midland Street is planned to connect to Town Field and the Beech Street Senior Center.

From the Town Yard, the main Phase 2 alignment continues west along the south side of the tracks past access points at A Street and White Street and behind the mixed-use development at 495–505 Trapelo Road. It then crosses Trapelo Road into Waverley Square—where options under consideration include routing along the north or south side of the depressed Waverley station tracks or constructing a landscaped "box-over" platform deck above the tracks—before crossing Lexington Street and following the north side of the Fitchburg Line into the Department of Conservation and Recreation's (DCR) Beaver Brook Reservation at the Waltham border.

=== Connecting trails ===
At its eastern terminus at Brighton Street, the Belmont Community Path connects directly to the 0.8-mile (1.3 km) Fitchburg Cutoff Path, which opened in 2013 and leads to Alewife station in Cambridge. At Alewife, the trail network intersects the Minuteman Bikeway (heading northwest to Arlington, Lexington, and Bedford), the Watertown–Cambridge Greenway (heading south toward the Charles River Bike Path), the Alewife Brook Reservation paths, and the Cambridge Linear Park and Somerville Community Path (continuing the Mass Central Rail Trail east to North Station and Boston).

At its planned western terminus, Phase 2 will connect with the trail network inside DCR's Beaver Brook Reservation and ultimately link to the Mass Central Rail Trail—Wayside in Waltham via an unimproved 0.72-mile (1.16 km) corridor between the Belmont town line and Beaver Street. Within Belmont, the path also provides access to walking and mountain biking trails at the Lone Tree Hill conservation land.

== History ==
=== Railroad corridor and parcel sales (1843–1976) ===
Rail service in Belmont began in 1843 when the Fitchburg Railroad opened between Boston and Waltham along a flat corridor north of Cushing Square and south of Belmont Hill. In 1881, the Massachusetts Central Railroad (reorganized in 1883 as the Central Massachusetts Railroad, or CMRR) opened between Cambridge and Hudson, laying its tracks through Belmont immediately parallel to and north of the Fitchburg Railroad tracks. While the Fitchburg Line was double-tracked through Belmont, the adjacent CMRR line was only partially double-tracked and converged with the Fitchburg Line just west of the Belmont border at Beaver Street in Waltham.

The Boston and Maine Railroad (B&M) acquired the CMRR via its lease of the Boston and Lowell Railroad in 1887 and subsequently leased the Fitchburg Railroad in 1900, rendering the parallel trackage through Belmont redundant. In 1952, a grade-separation project depressed the tracks through Waverley Square to eliminate a hazardous at-grade street crossing that had existed since 1844; the excavation converted much of the former CMRR right-of-way in western Belmont into a steep embankment. As passenger and freight revenues declined in the post-World War II era, the financially troubled B&M began selling off surplus parcels of the former CMRR corridor in Belmont to private owners between 1958 and 1971:

- Between 1958 and 1967, five parcels along Pleasant Street west of Belmont Center totaling 85,268 square feet (7,922 m^{2}) were sold to commercial buyers, along with a 39,536-square-foot (3,673 m^{2}) parcel at 40 Brighton Street in 1964.
- In 1971, shortly after filing for bankruptcy in 1970, the B&M sold a landlocked, 3,558.7-foot (1,085 m) strip encompassing 107,172 square feet (9,957 m^{2}) north of the Fitchburg tracks—stretching from behind 7 Channing Road in Belmont Center to 291 Channing Road.

In 1976, the MBTA acquired the B&M's remaining commuter rail trackage and right-of-way assets, including the active Fitchburg Line and the abandoned CMRR corridor west of Waltham.

=== Early safety concerns and feasibility studies (1982–2001) ===
Proposals for grade-separated pedestrian infrastructure along the Belmont rail corridor first emerged after a Belmont High School student was struck and killed by a train while crossing the Fitchburg Line embankment near Alexander Avenue in 1982. In 1983, Belmont Town Meeting established an Underpass Study Committee to evaluate a pedestrian link between the Alexander Avenue Extension and the high school playing fields. Although the committee concluded at the time that a $500,000 tunnel was prohibitively expensive for the town alone, it noted that state funding might cover up to 75% of the cost if the crossing were incorporated into a broader bicycle and pedestrian path.

Interest in a multi-use trail grew during the late 1980s and early 1990s alongside the planning of the nearby Minuteman Bikeway. In October 1994, the Belmont Board of Selectmen appointed the Bikeway Planning Committee to explore a path linking Belmont Center to Alewife station and the Paul Dudley White Bike Path along the Charles River. At the town's request, Belmont was included in the 1997 Central Massachusetts Rail Trail Feasibility Study prepared by the Central Transportation Planning Staff (CTPS) of the Boston Metropolitan Planning Organization, and the town simultaneously prepared the 1997 Belmont Bikeway Preliminary Feasibility Analysis.

While the 1997 studies confirmed that a path through Belmont was feasible and introduced the concept of a "community path" linking residential neighborhoods to schools, libraries, and parks, they identified three major obstacles: the need to site the path adjacent to an active commuter rail line, the prior sale of large sections of the former CMRR right-of-way to private owners, and opposition from some Channing Road abutters. Regional momentum stalled in late 1997 and 1998 after neighboring Weston voted to withdraw from the MCRT project and state transportation budgets tightened during the early 2000s recession.

=== Land preservation and renewed planning (2008–2018) ===
Despite the decade-long dormancy of the municipal project, the Belmont Citizens Forum (BCF), a local 501(c)(3) environmental nonprofit, took steps in 2008 to preserve the corridor's key private parcel. Having learned in the mid-1990s that the narrow strip of former CMRR land behind Channing Road was privately held, the BCF approached the owner. Using proceeds from a legal settlement over a sewer connection permit at the McLean Hospital "Woodlands" development, the BCF purchased the 107,172-square-foot (9,957 m^{2}) parcel in 2008 for $77,000, publicly pledging to donate the land to the town for a future community path and abutter buffer.

Between 2010 and 2013, MassDOT constructed Belmont's first short rail trail segment, the Fitchburg Cutoff Path from Alewife station to Brighton Street, which included 683 feet (208 m) within Belmont. During the same period, BCF learned from rail-trail advocate Craig Della Penna about Massachusetts General Laws Chapter 40, Section 54A, which prohibits municipalities from issuing building permits on former railroad rights-of-way without written consent from the Secretary of Transportation. Alerting the Belmont Select Board and State Representative William Brownsberger, the BCF helped secure a 13.8-foot (4.2 m) path easement across the parcel at 40–42 Brighton Street, which the owner granted to the DCR in 2011–2012 as a condition of obtaining a commercial building permit.

In 2012, the Metropolitan Area Planning Council (MAPC) published the Belmont/Waltham Community Trail Alignment Study, which divided the town into five segments and strongly recommended an underpass at Alexander Avenue. The following year, a CTPS regional study ranked the Belmont gap as the second-highest priority bicycle network gap inside Route 495, behind only the Somerville Community Path extension. The town subsequently established the Community Path Advisory Committee (CPAC, 2012–2014) and the Community Path Implementation Advisory Committee (CPIAC, 2014–2017).

In 2015, Belmont Town Meeting appropriated $100,000 for a comprehensive feasibility study, matched by $100,000 in state transportation funds secured by Representative David Rogers and Senator Brownsberger. CPIAC held ten public meetings and delivered the Feasibility Study for the Belmont Community Path in November 2017. Concurrently, the MBTA's $306 million Fitchburg Line Improvement Project (2015–2017) installed new tracks, crossovers, and three signal houses along the south side of the corridor abutting the high school. While the new signal houses constrained path options on the south side of the tracks, the MBTA adjusted the placement of one signal house at the request of Belmont officials to preserve clearance for a future underpass at Alexander Avenue.

=== Phase 1 design, right-of-way assembly, and construction bidding (2018–present) ===
In March 2018, Senator Brownsberger and town officials confirmed with MassDOT that the eastern half of the Belmont path could be admitted into the federal/state TIP pipeline in two intersecting pieces: Phase 1A (the Alexander Avenue tunnel to synchronize with construction of the new Belmont Middle and High School) and Phase 1B (Fitchburg Cutoff Path to the Clark Street Bridge). MassDOT's Project Review Committee approved the project in July 2018. After a commercial property owner on the south side of the tracks declined to grant an easement and the MBTA expressed safety objections to an at-grade track crossing at Brighton Street, the Select Board voted in 2019 to route Phase 1B entirely along the north side of the Fitchburg Line.

To fund engineering design, Town Meeting appropriated Community Preservation Act (CPA) funds in November 2018 and May 2019, supplemented by a MassTrails grant awarded in June 2019. The newly appointed Community Path Project Committee (CPPC) selected Nitsch Engineering to lead the Phase 1 design in summer 2019. Nitsch submitted the 25% design package to MassDOT in January 2022 (followed by a MassDOT design public hearing in March 2024), the 75% design in February and September 2025, the 100% design on December 18, 2025, and final Plans, Specifications, and Estimates (PS&E) in July through September 2026.

Securing the right-of-way was the town's final obligation prior to construction bidding. Belmont financed title searches, appraisals, and easement acquisitions through CPA appropriations in 2021, 2024, and 2026, alongside a MassTrails right-of-way grant awarded in 2024 and additional 2026 Town Meeting funding to secure an access spur easement on Alexander Avenue. In October 2025, Town Meeting overwhelmingly approved Warrant Articles 5 and 6 authorizing the Select Board to acquire the necessary easements and use middle-high school land for the north–south connector.

On August 10, 2026, the Belmont Select Board unanimously approved the final right-of-way package encompassing 25 temporary construction easements (80,652 square feet (7,493 m^{2})) and 30 permanent easements (275,805 square feet (25,623 m^{2})) across 19 property owners. Three public and nonprofit entities contributed 94.36% of the permanent right-of-way (260,260 square feet (24,179 m^{2})) at no cost to the town:

1. The MBTA provided 120,243 square feet (11,171 m^{2}) (43.6%) via a trail lease along the Fitchburg Line.
2. The Belmont Citizens Forum donated its 107,172 square feet (9,957 m^{2}) (38.9%) parcel behind Channing Road.
3. The Town of Belmont and Belmont School Committee contributed 32,845 square feet (3,051 m^{2}) (11.9%), including 9,182 square feet (853 m^{2}) across the high school campus.

The remaining permanent easements were acquired from two commercial properties (4.58%) and residential owners (1.05%).

MassDOT advertised Phase 1 for construction bids on September 12, 2026—meeting the Federal Fiscal Year 2026 deadline—with bid opening scheduled for November 10, 2026. Under MassDOT's project schedule, construction submittals and material procurement run through 2027, followed by preliminary path construction starting in July 2027. Installation of the Alexander Avenue pedestrian tunnel is scheduled for a one-week shutdown of commuter rail service on the Fitchburg Line in August 2028, with overall Phase 1 completion projected for mid-summer 2029.

=== Phase 2 planning (2022–present) ===
In 2022, the Belmont Select Board expanded the charge of the CPPC to oversee Phase 2 of the path from the Clark Street Bridge to the Waltham line. Following a CPA appropriation by Town Meeting and a MassTrails grant in 2022, the town conducted route selection and preliminary design beginning in 2022. After public surveys and stakeholder meetings in early 2023, the CPPC unanimously endorsed the recommended southern route past the Belmont Village housing complex and Town Yard in May 2023.

Progress on the segment adjacent to Belmont Village has required coordination with the Belmont Housing Authority's ongoing plans to redevelop the 75-year-old public housing complex. In April 2026, Belmont Town Meeting appropriated an additional $250,000 in CPA matching funds to unlock a $1 million federal earmark secured by U.S. Representative Katherine Clark to advance the Phase 2 engineering design.

== See also ==
- Mass Central Rail Trail
- Mass Central Rail Trail—Wayside
- Fitchburg Cutoff Path
- Somerville Community Path
- Minuteman Bikeway
