= Alewife Brook Reservation =

State park and reservation in Massachusetts, USA

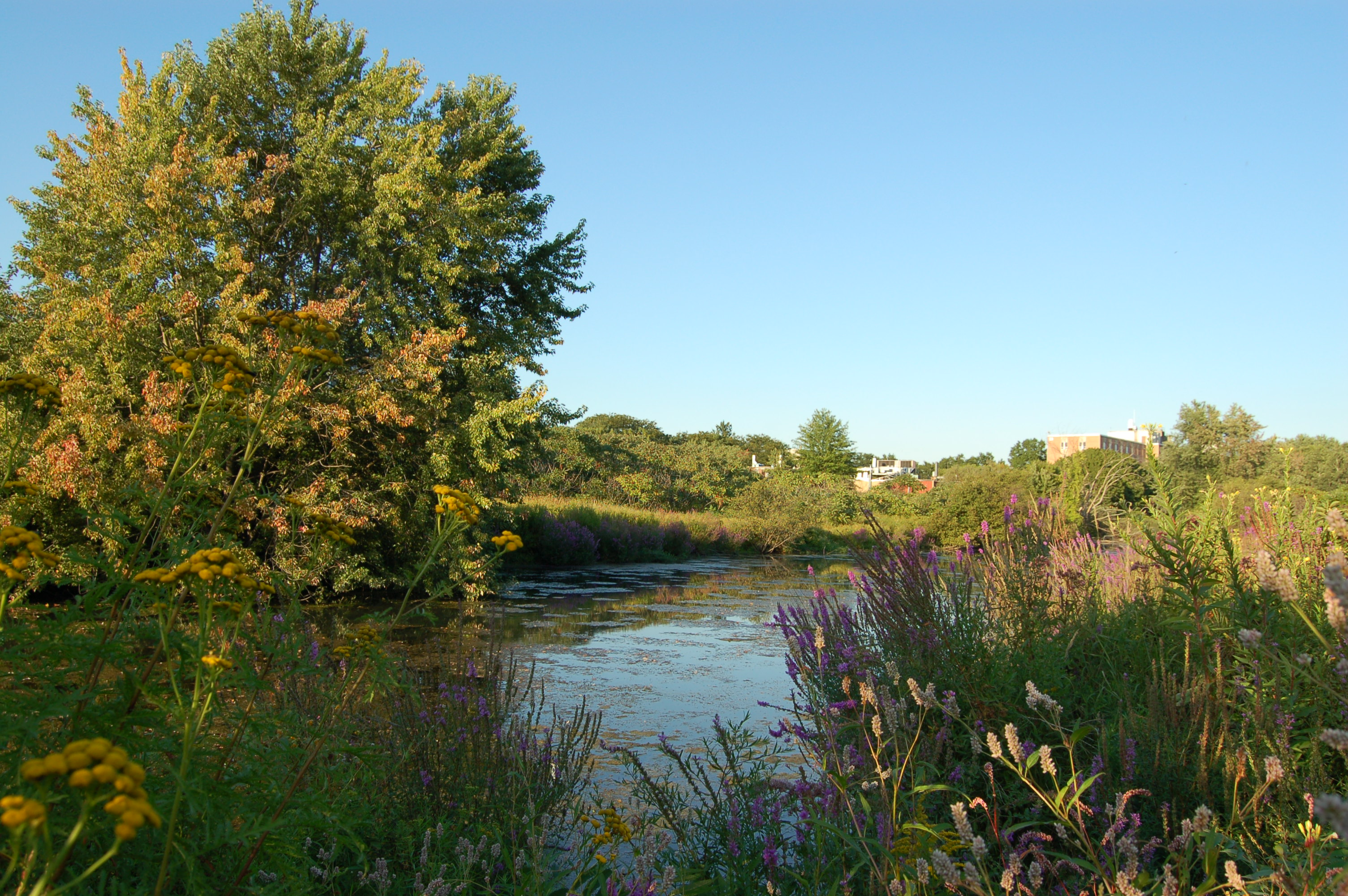
- The Little River running through Alewife Brook Reservation

- Location within Massachusetts Location within the United States
- Location: Cambridge, Somerville, and Arlington, Massachusetts, United States
- Coordinates: 42°23′50″N 71°08′32″W
- Area: 136 acres (55 ha)
- Elevation: 0 ft (0 m)
- Administrator: Massachusetts Department of Conservation and Recreation
- Website: Official website

Alewife Brook Reservation is a Massachusetts state park and urban wild located in Cambridge, Arlington, and Somerville. The park is managed by the state Department of Conservation and Recreation and was established in 1900. It is named for Alewife Brook, which was also historically known as Menotomy River (the village of Menotomy is now Arlington), a tributary of the Mystic River.

== Description ==
A large proportion of the park is wetland, including the Little River, though there is also a wooded upland and meadow area. The reservation serves as a habitat for numerous indigenous and migratory birds. Common species include osprey, great blue heron and the woodcock, whose unusual mating ritual may sometimes be observed by visitors. Additionally, the park's ponds (Little Pond, Perch Pond, and Blair Pond) provide spring spawning grounds for anadromous herring, which migrate from the Atlantic Ocean via the Mystic River and Alewife Brook, a tributary which, in turn, drains the Little River.

The southern end and single largest part of the reservation is adjacent to the Alewife Station at the northern end of the MBTA Red Line in Cambridge. The Minuteman Bikeway terminates at the reservation and the Fitchburg Cutoff Path and Alewife Greenway run through it. The reservation includes Alewife Brook as it flows north through Cambridge, Arlington, and Somerville toward the Mystic River. Much of this corridor is fairly narrow, and contains only the brook, the Alewife Brook Parkway and modest buffer strips of land on either side and in between the brook and the parkway. North of Broadway the area between the brook and the parkway opens, and has been developed to include playgrounds, playing fields, and Dilboy Stadium. South of the Fitchburg Line is the small Blair Pond, which has public access from Mooney Street and Normandy Ave. There are multiuse paths or sidewalks on at least one side of the brook for the entire length of Alewife Brook, which are being improved as part of the Alewife Greenway project. Little Pond is surrounded by fencing and private property, so there is no public access to the shoreline.

== History ==
In the 1600s, the area from Fresh Pond to Spy Pond was a tidal wetland known as the Great Swamp. It was known for its Alewife, and there was an important weir near what is now the intersection of Massachusetts Avenue and Massachusetts Route 16. Most of the swamp was drained and developed as farmland, then mining for brick clay, tanneries, and landfill.

The Fitchburg Railroad main line in 1843 was the first rail link constructed through the swampy area in western Cambridge. It still serves as the MBTA Commuter Rail Fitchburg Line. The Lexington and West Cambridge Railroad was branched off in 1846, with the curving connection still visible today, passing under Alewife Brook Parkway, along the west side of the Alewife Station parking garage, and proceeding northwest along the right-of-way of the present-day Minuteman Bikeway. The Watertown Branch Railroad was opened in 1851, branching from the Fitchburg and curving south behind what is now the Fresh Pond Shopping Center on the east side of Alewife Brook Parkway (then merely swampland). By 1852, several spurs were serving local freight customers, including ice houses on the south side of Spy Pond.

In 1870, the Boston and Lowell Railroad bought the former Lexington and West Cambridge Railroad, by then renamed the Lexington and Arlington Railroad, and constructed a connection from the Alewife area through what is now Davis Square to Somerville Junction. Most of this connection is now the Somerville Community Path and Alewife Linear Park, but at its western end it passed through what is now Alewife Center and met up with the Lexington, after curving past the stub ends of Fairmont and Lafayette Streets. This new connection also had a southerly fork known as the Fitchburg Cutoff, passing just north of the present-day Alewife Station, crossing the now-removed Fitchburg-Lexington connection, and joining the Fitchburg mainline. A map from 1903 shows these railroads criss-crossing the reservation, as well as Alewife Brook proceeding farther south to drain Fresh Pond. The swampy area is largely undeveloped, compared to the surrounding neighborhoods.

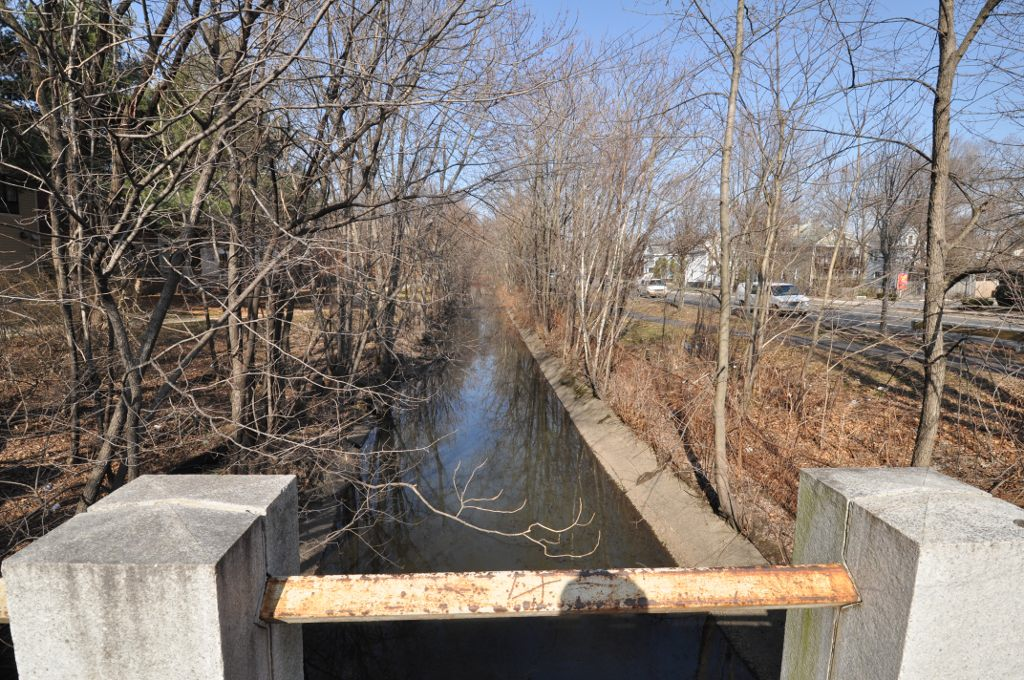
The heavily channelized Alewife Brook as seen from the northeast side of the Massachusetts Avenue bridge

The reservation was originally planned by landscape designer Charles Eliot in conjunction with the Alewife Brook Parkway, although it has been substantially altered since its initial set-aside. It forms part of Boston's Metropolitan Park District, established in 1893. The Alewife Brook was straightened and channelized next to the parkway between 1909 and 1912, with road construction completed by 1916. Landscaping was performed by the famed Olmsted Brothers firm. Especially in the 19th, 20th, and 21st centuries, the surrounding land was developed with residential, commercial, and industrial buildings.

=== Storm water management wetland ===
Beginning in 2011, the City of Cambridge constructed a 3.4-acre storm water management wetland in the reservation, just west of Alewife Station. The project opened in October 2013. The wetland stores and gradually releases collected storm water runoff from nearby parts of Cambridge, including the Huron and Concord Avenue areas. A basin and native plantings will slow the flow of runoff and remove pollutants and nutrients before they enter the Little River. The area includes an amphitheater, interpretive signage, overlooks and boardwalks, and links the bike paths on either side. Habitats, ranging from deep marsh to riparian forest, were created.

The land bordering Massachusetts Bay in eastern Massachusetts once consisted of spongy wetlands that worked to improve water quality and regulate flow in the surrounding rivers, however, the natural structure and ecology of the land was disturbed by urbanization of the city of Cambridge and surrounding areas. With this degradation, water pollution from sanitary sewer overflow became a huge problem in the Alewife Basin. To combat this issue, the city was ordered to separate its sanitary and stormwater sewage systems. In 2003, the Department of Conservation and Recreation and the Massachusetts Water Resource Authority collaborated to create a green infrastructure plan involving large scale restoration of a neglected wetland within the Alewife Reservation in Cambridge with additional development to convert the reservation into a usable public park. The restored wetlands would work to regulate flooding and flow rates and improve water quality by removing debris and pollutants from urban stormwater runoff as it is filtered through the wetlands.

The outcomes of this plan proved to be highly successful as they have addressed various aspects of the region's broader urban systems. Not only has the project improved water quality and reduced flooding and sewage overflows within the area, but it has also promoted biodiversity by providing safe and healthy urban wildlife habitats as well as sustainability by reducing the environmental footprint of the city. Additionally, the park's renewal has created shared public space that fosters a sense of community in the surrounding areas and provides an educational platform for those communities with environmental education opportunities and outdoor classroom space built into the park's design.

Despite its success, the project has received some push back. Before the plan was implemented, a series of court cases arose from public discourse in the community that deemed the project "an inappropriate use of parkland". Additionally, the initial predicted cost of the project was $3 million, however it is now a part of a $171 million investment.

=== Alewife Brook Greenway ===
A bike path project for the reservation received $4.5M from the American Recovery and Reinvestment Act of 2009. The Alewife Greenway, a 1.5-mile (2.4 km) bike path following the parkway from the Mystic River to the Minuteman Bikeway near Alewife station, was completed in October 2012.
