= Fitchburg Cutoff =

Former rail line in Massachusetts, US

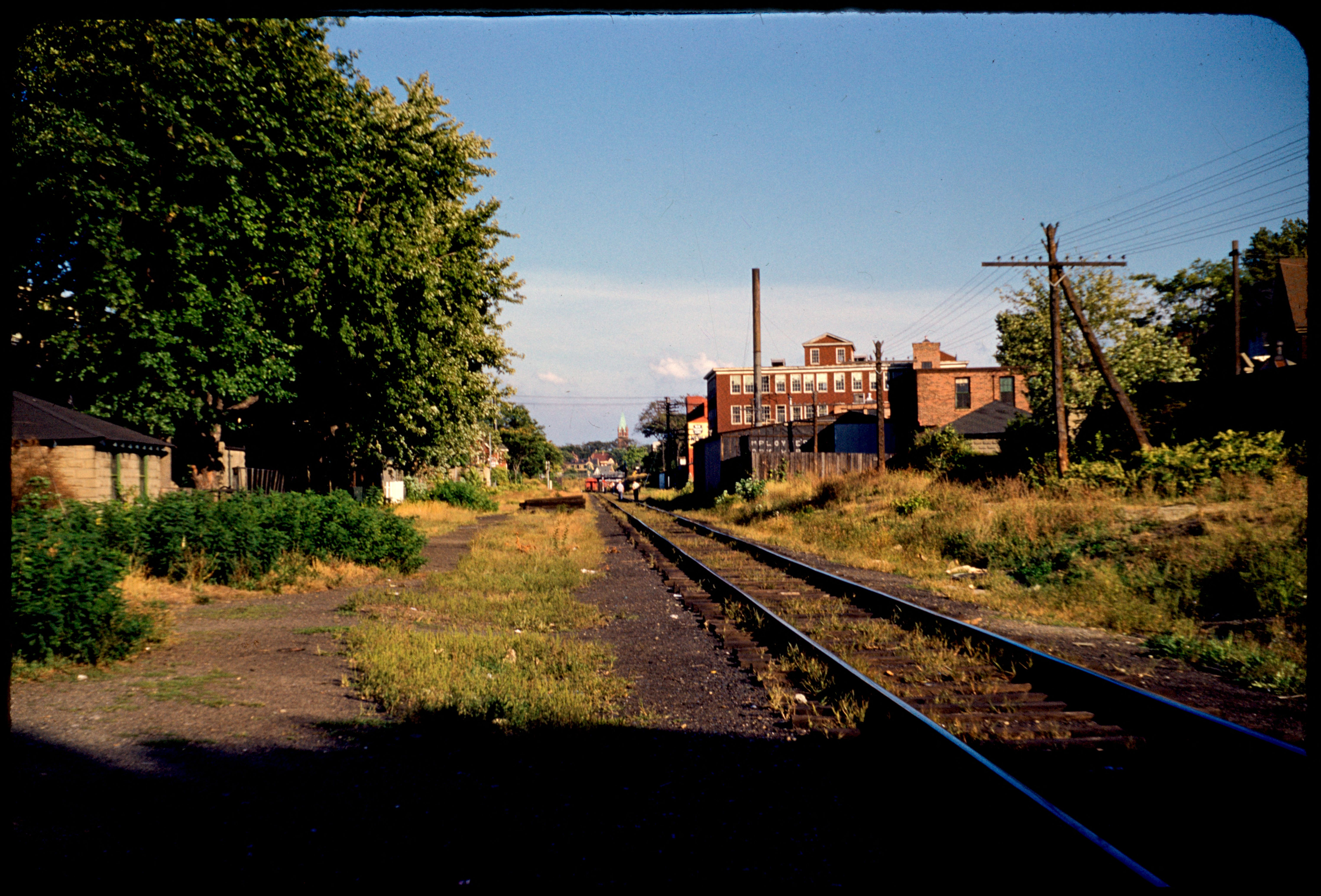
- The Fitchburg Cutoff east from Highland Road in 1953

Overview
- Owner: Boston and Maine Railroad
- Termini: Hills Crossing; Somerville Junction
- Stations: 3

History
- Opened: 1870, 1881
- Closed: 1979–80, 1983, 2007

Technical
- Line length: 2.8 mi (4.5 km)
- Track gauge: 4 ft 8 1/2 in (1,435 mm)

The Fitchburg Cutoff (also called the Freight Cutoff) was a rail line running 2.8 miles (4.5 km) from Brighton Street (Hills Crossing station) in Belmont, Massachusetts, to Somerville Junction in Somerville, Massachusetts. It was constructed in two segments in 1870 and 1881 to connect the Lexington Branch and Massachusetts Central Railroad to the Boston and Lowell Railroad. Passenger service lasted until 1927. Freight service ended in 1979–80 to allow construction of the Red Line Northwest Extension; the line was abandoned in three sections in 1979, 1983, and 2007.

All of the right-of-way, except a short section near Alewife station, has been reused for three connecting rail trails: the Fitchburg Cutoff Path from Brighton Street to Alewife station, the Alewife Linear Park or Linear Park from Alewife to Massachusetts Avenue, and the Somerville Community Path east of Massachusetts Avenue. The paths are part of the Mass Central Rail Trail.

== Route ==
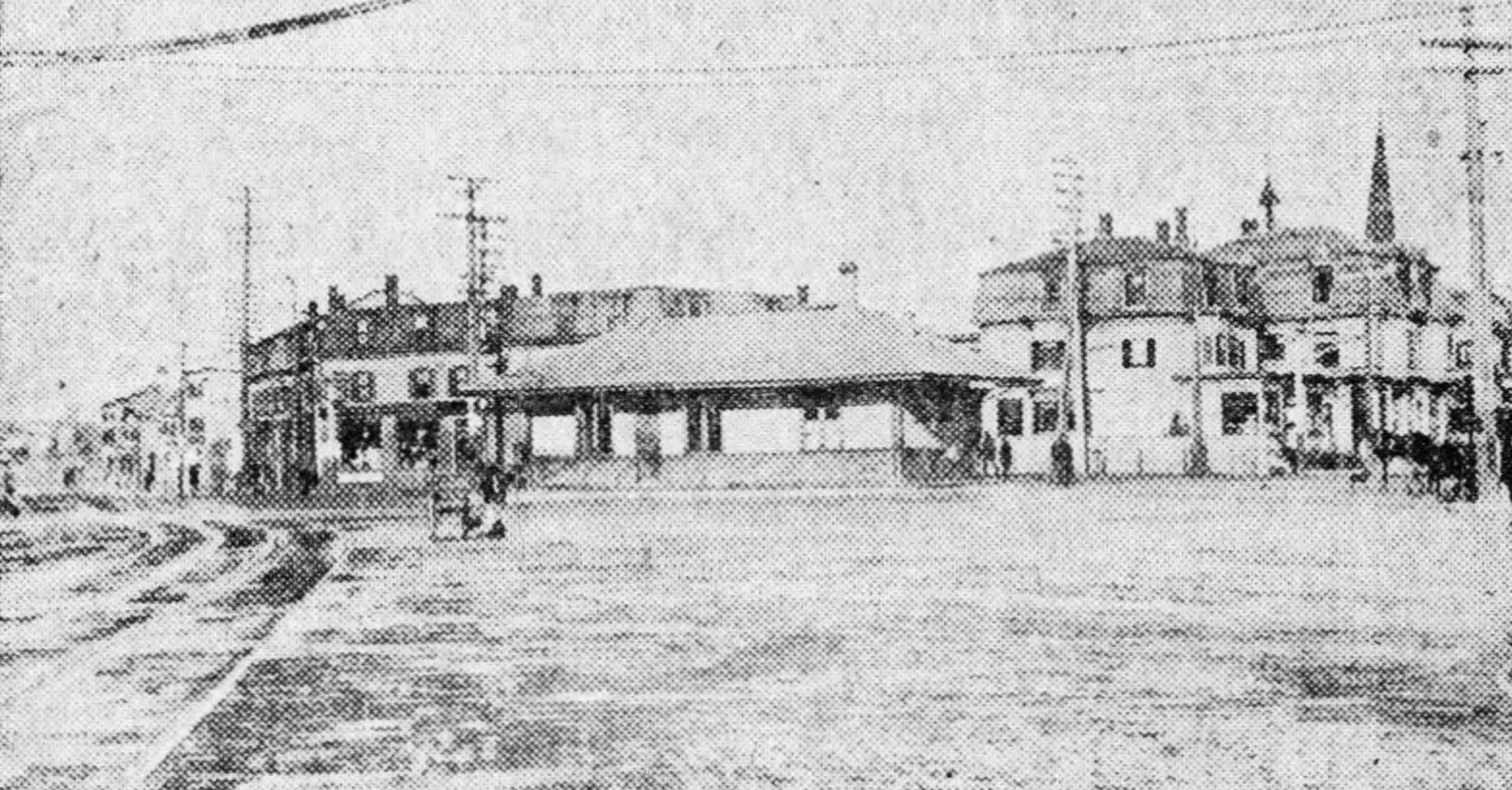
West Somerville station and grade crossings

The line was 2.8 miles (4.5 km) long, running approximately east–west. The west end connected to the Central Massachusetts Branch at Hill Crossing station at Brighton Street in Belmont, parallel to the Fitchburg Division main line (now the MBTA Fitchburg Line). It crossed the Lexington Branch (after 1927) at grade in West Cambridge and crossed under Alewife Brook Parkway, with the pre-1927 connection to the Lexington Branch near Jackson Street. The line crossed Massachusetts Avenue and other streets at grade, then continued into Somerville, where it ran at grade through Davis Square with crossings of Holland Street and College Avenue. It crossed additional streets at grade, then passed under Lowell Street and joined the Southern Division (now the Lowell Line) at Somerville Junction. After 1887, passenger stations on the line were North Cambridge (also called North Cambridge Junction and North Avenue) at Massachusetts Avenue, West Somerville (Elm Street) at Davis Square, and Somerville Highlands at Highland Road.

== History ==
=== Passenger service ===
Map showing the Fitchburg Cutoff and nearby lines: Lexington Branch and 1870-opened connector; Eastern portion of Fitchburg Cutoff, opened 1870; Central Massachusetts Branch and western portion of Fitchburg Cutoff, opened 1881; Lexington Branch reroute, reopened 1927; Central Massachusetts Branch reroute, opened 1927; Fitchburg Division and Watertown Branch; Southern Division

The B&L acquired control of the Lexington and Arlington Railroad (Lexington Branch) in 1869, and purchased it in 1870, to prevent it from building to Lowell and thus becoming a competitor to the B&L. In 1870, the B&L built a cutoff from Lake Street to Somerville Junction to connect the newly acquired branch to its mainline. (Early plans called for the cutoff to connect to the B&L further north at Willow Bridge station.) Service began on December 1, 1870. In January 1876, William Robinson installed one of the first test applications of his track circuit signaling system on the line between Elm Street and North Avenue. On June 14, 1876, Pedro II of Brazil, who was touring the United States, travelled to Elm Street station to view the system.

The western section was built in 1881 by the Massachusetts Central Railroad (MC) (which paralleled the Fitchburg Railroad west of Brighton Street) to connect to the B&L for access to Boston. It connected to the existing Lexington Branch cutoff near Jackson Street, west of North Cambridge station, and had no stations between Hills Crossing and North Cambridge. Service began on October 1, 1881. By 1883 the MC was succeeded by the Central Massachusetts Railroad and service resumed in 1885. The B&L, which controlled the Central Massachusetts, was acquired by the Boston and Maine Railroad (B&M) in 1887. The B&L became the Southern Division mainline, while the Central Massachusetts became a branchline. The original Willow Avenue and Somerville Highlands stations were replaced by a new Somerville Highlands station at Highland Road around 1887. In 1900, the B&M acquired the Fitchburg Railroad as its Fitchburg Division.

The city of Somerville proposed to eliminate the five grade crossings on the cutoff within its borders, including the pair of College Avenue and Holland Street at Davis Square, in the early 1900s. Most grade crossings on the Fitchburg Division mainline were eliminated over the next decade, but those on the cutoff were not. On January 31, 1915, the West Somerville station building was moved west of Holland Street at the request of the mayor to improve conditions in Davis Square.

In 1926–27, the B&M built two new sections of track in North Cambridge; these allowed the Lexington Branch and the Central Massachusetts Branch to use the Fitchburg mainline east of Alewife Brook Parkway. On April 24, 1927, passenger service from the two branches was rerouted over these new sections and the Fitchburg mainline; North Cambridge, West Somerville, and Somerville Highlands stations were closed. Although residents were opposed to the closures, the B&M wished to avoid the grade crossings on the line, which had seen 70 crashes in the previous six years. The old line from Brighton Street to Somerville Junction became the freight-only Freight Cutoff (Fitchburg Cutoff); it was rebuilt with heavier rails to handle heavy freights headed to and from the new Somerville freight yard. In late 1927, an additional main track was built on the Southern Division from Somerville Junction to the yard to reduce the incidence of stopped freight trains blocking crossings on the cutoff.

=== Rapid transit conversion ===
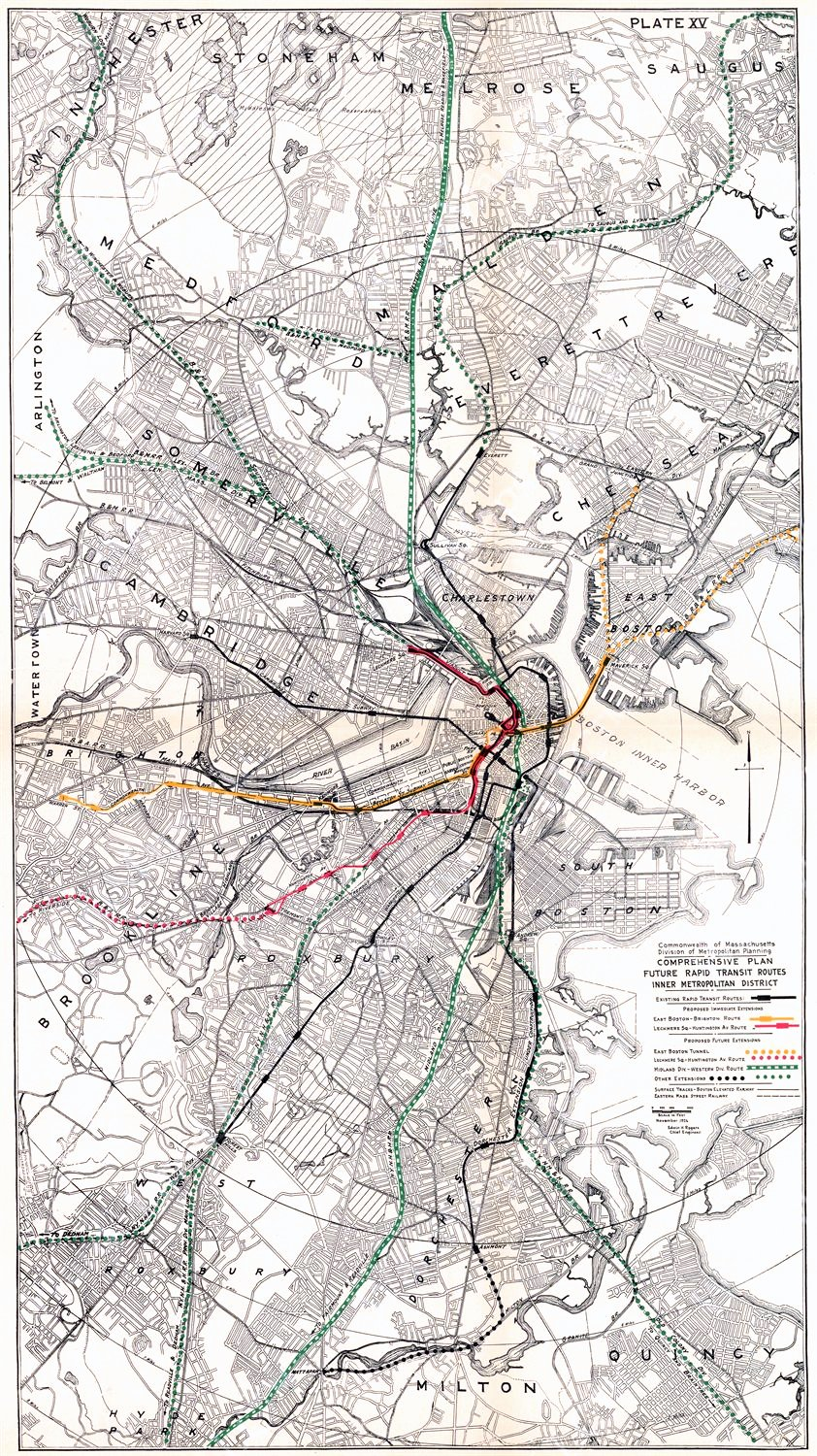
Map showing the 1926-proposed extensions northwest from Lechmere (at left)

In the 1920s, the cutoff was considered the most likely route for rapid transit service to Somerville and North Cambridge. (Extension of the Cambridge–Dorchester Line – now the Red Line – north from Harvard station was not considered likely.) The Report on Improved Transportation Facilities, published by the Boston Division of Metropolitan Planning in 1926, proposed extension from Lechmere to North Cambridge via the Southern Division and the 1870-built cutoff. Among the potential further extensions in the report was extension of the North Cambridge line to Bedford via the Lexington Branch.

In 1935, the city requested that the line be grade-separated as part of a Works Progress Administration-funded grade crossing elimination program. A proposal that year by a citizen's group called for a rapid transit extension to North Cambridge. A new highway was to run from the Northern Artery over the tracks at street level, then adjacent to the tracks on the lowered cutoff to connect to the existing Mohawk Trail expressway at Alewife Brook Parkway. Neither project was built, and the grade crossings were not eliminated; crashes and stalled freight trains continued to be a problem. Even decades after regular passenger service ended on the line, it was occasionally used as a detour route when the Fitchburg Route mainline was blocked in Somerville.

Various proposals in the 1930s called for rapid transit use of the cutoff; some called for it to be connected to the East Boston Tunnel (now the Blue Line) rather than the Tremont Street subway (now the Green Line). The 1945 and 1947 reports by the state Coolidge Commission called for extensions from Lechmere to Woburn over the Southern Division, and Harvard to Arlington over the Lexington Branch; the cutoff was not proposed as a route. The 1962 North Terminal Area Study called for the Main Line (now the Orange Line) to be relocated along the B&M Western Route. It was to have a branch via the Southern Division to Woburn or Arlington (the latter also using the cutoff). The 1966 Program for Mass Transportation, and subsequent reports by the Massachusetts Bay Transportation Authority (MBTA), largely followed the routes laid out by the Coolidge Commission. Green Line service would be extended from Lechmere over the Southern Division, and Red Line service from Harvard (with various routings proposed to reach the Lexington Branch); the cutoff was not proposed for conversion.

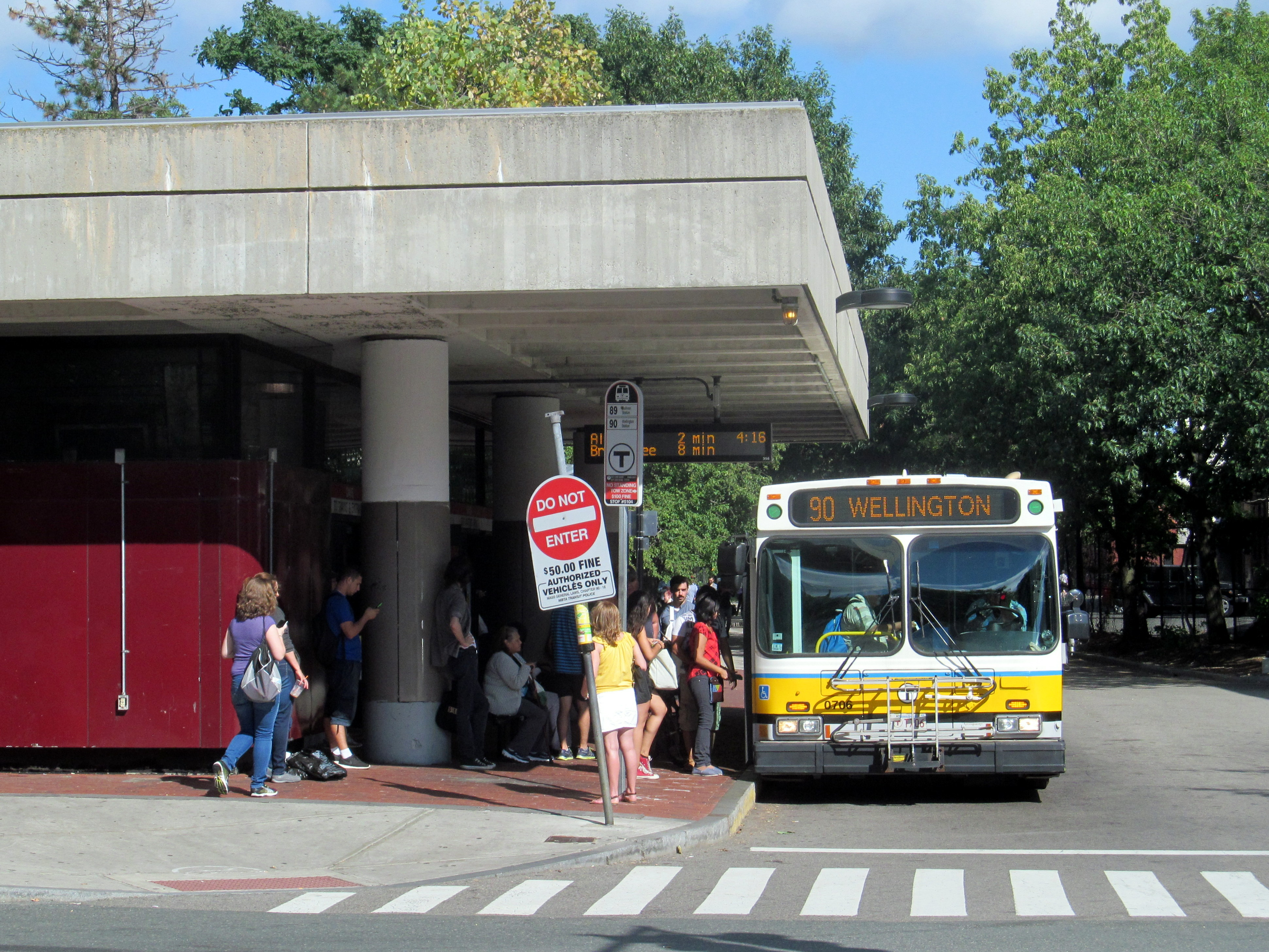
The east headhouse and busway at Davis station, built on the Cutoff alignment

The B&M replaced the Somerville yard with smaller yards elsewhere in the system in the 1970s, ending regular use of the cutoff by "as many as two-dozen mile-long freight trains daily". The route chosen for the Red Line Northwest Extension in the mid-1970s included a station at Davis Square, with the rapid transit tunnel running under a segment of the cutoff from Davis Square to east of Alewife station. In April 1980, the west half of the cutoff was abandoned to allow for construction of the extension. The eastern portion was used to haul dirt removed from the tunnel for reuse around the region; it was abandoned in 1983 except for a short section serving an industrial customer at Somervile Junction. That segment was abandoned in 2007.

=== Path conversion ===
Map of the trails and Red Line reuse of the Fitchburg Cutoff alignment

As part of the Red Line extension, the 1.3-mile (2.1 km) Alewife Linear Park or Linear Park rail trail was constructed from Alewife to Davis, opening in 1985. Except for a short section near Alewife station, it follows the former railroad route. The Somerville Community Path opened 0.6 miles (1.0 km) from Davis Square east to Cedar Street in 1992; the 0.3-mile (0.5 km) segment of the Alewife Linear Park within Somerville was redesignated as part of the Community Path, leaving the western 1.0 mile (1.6 km) within Cambridge as the Alewife Linear Park.

The Minuteman Bikeway opened in 1993, connecting to the existing trail at Alewife station. The Alewife Linear Park crossing of Massachusetts Avenue, which originally zig-zagged using existing crosswalks, was signalized as a direct crossing in 2011. A 0.3-mile (0.48 km) extension of the Community Path to Lowell Street opened in 2015; it was further extended along the Lowell Line in 2023, known as the Somerville Community Path Extension, as part of the Green Line Extension project.

A project to redesign the 35-year-old Linear Park began in 2021. The project creates a wider repaved path, adds secondary paths, and includes new plantings including over 100 new trees. Construction began in August 2025; it was halted by a temporary restraining order brought by plaintiffs claiming the project would harm mature trees, but resumed in October 2025 after a preliminary injunction was denied in September.

The 0.8-mile (1.3 km) segment west of Alewife station through the Alewife Brook Reservation was used as an unpaved trail; a stone dust surface was added in the 1990s. Construction of the paved Fitchburg Cutoff Path took place from September 2010 to August 2013, with a new bridge built over a stormwater management wetland at Alewife. The planned Belmont Community Path will extend west through Belmont parallel to the Fitchburg Line, connecting with existing sections of the Mass Central Rail Trail.

In 1985–86, an access road was constructed from the Alewife station garage to the Route 2/Alewife Brook Parkway intersection, following the cutoff alignment for about 750 feet (230 m). The Alewife Linear Park runs as a sidewalk along the access road for most of that length.

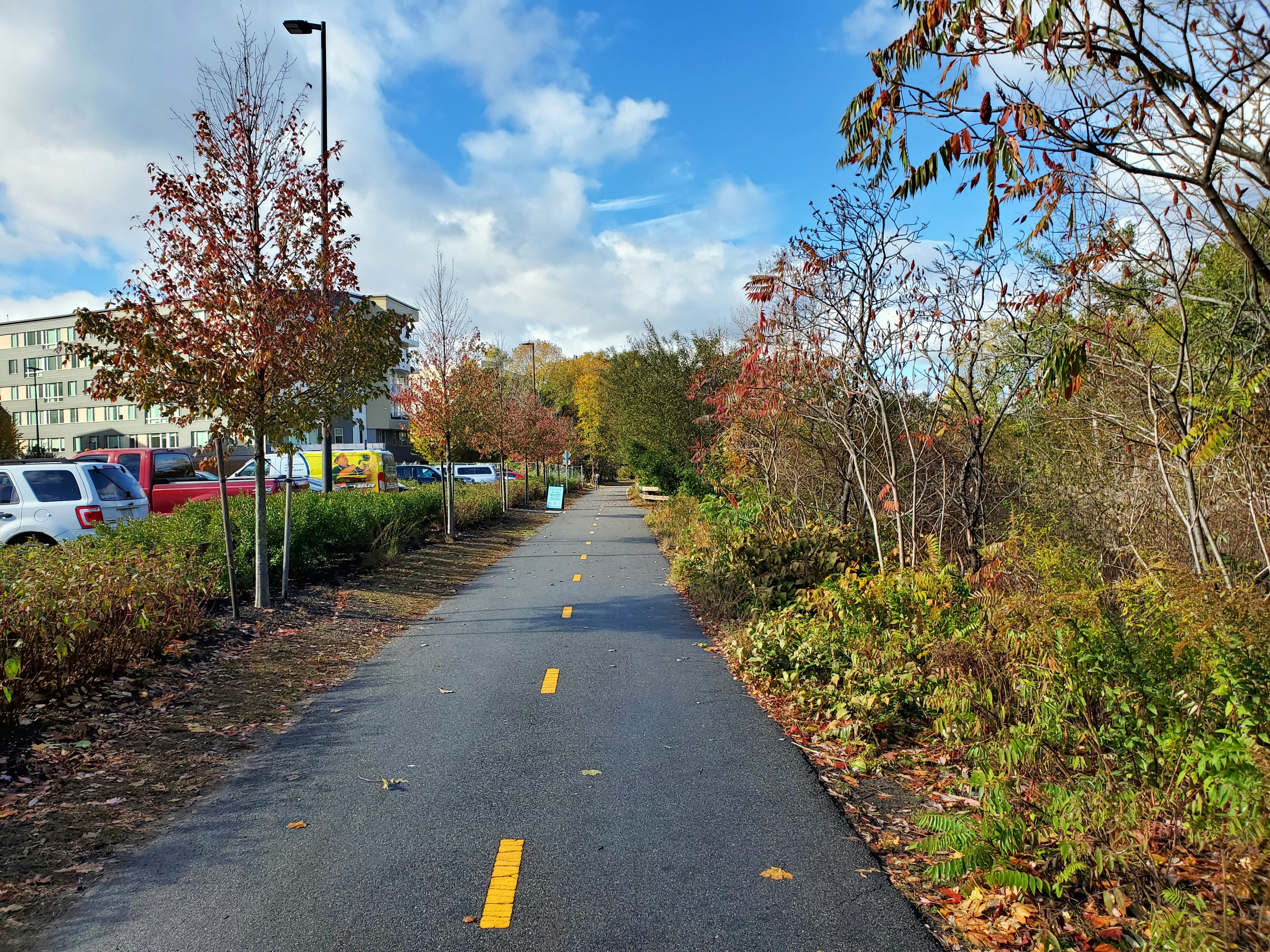
Fitchburg Cutoff Path

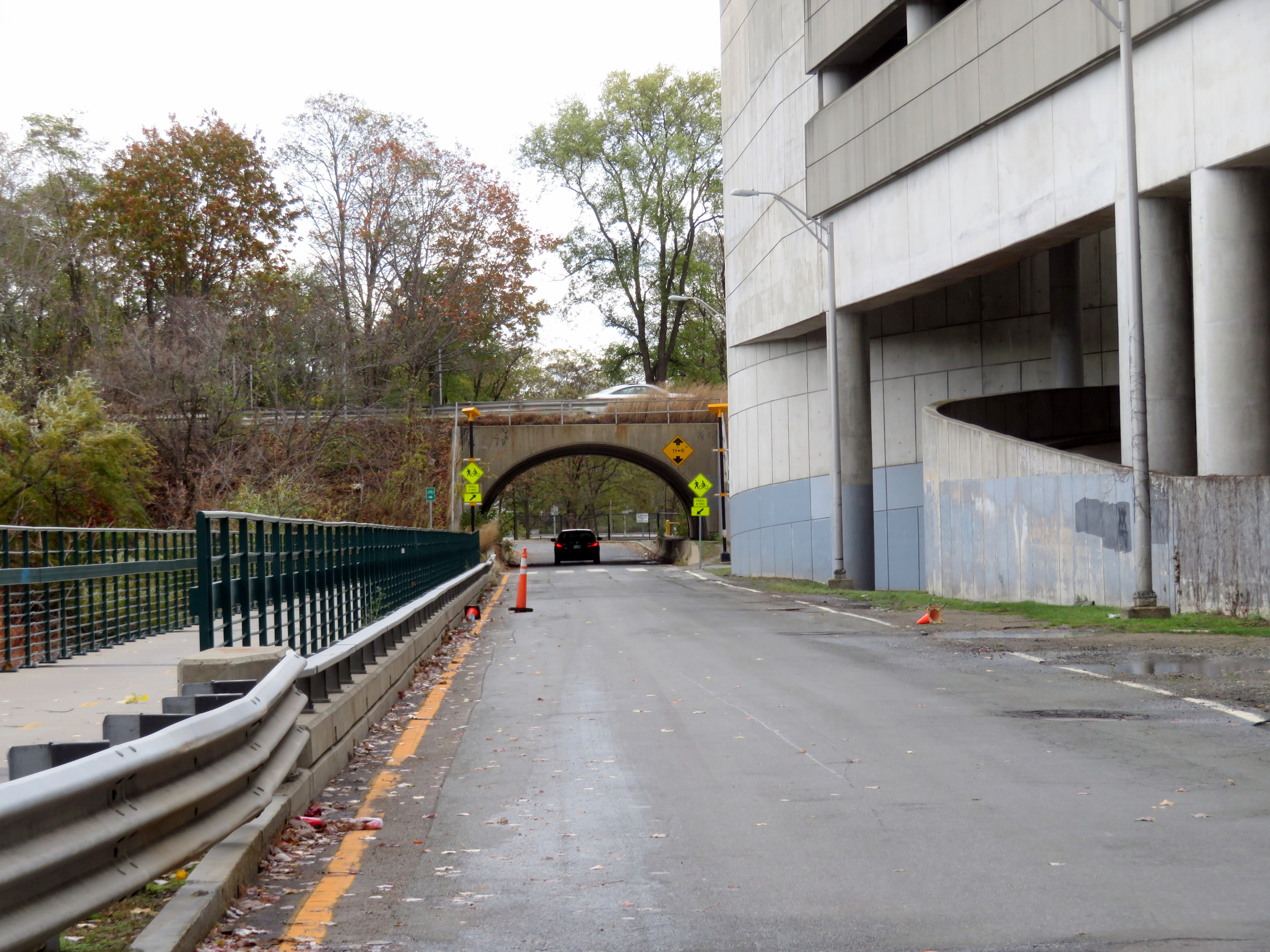
The Route 2 access road, with a sidewalk serving as part of the Alewife Linear Park

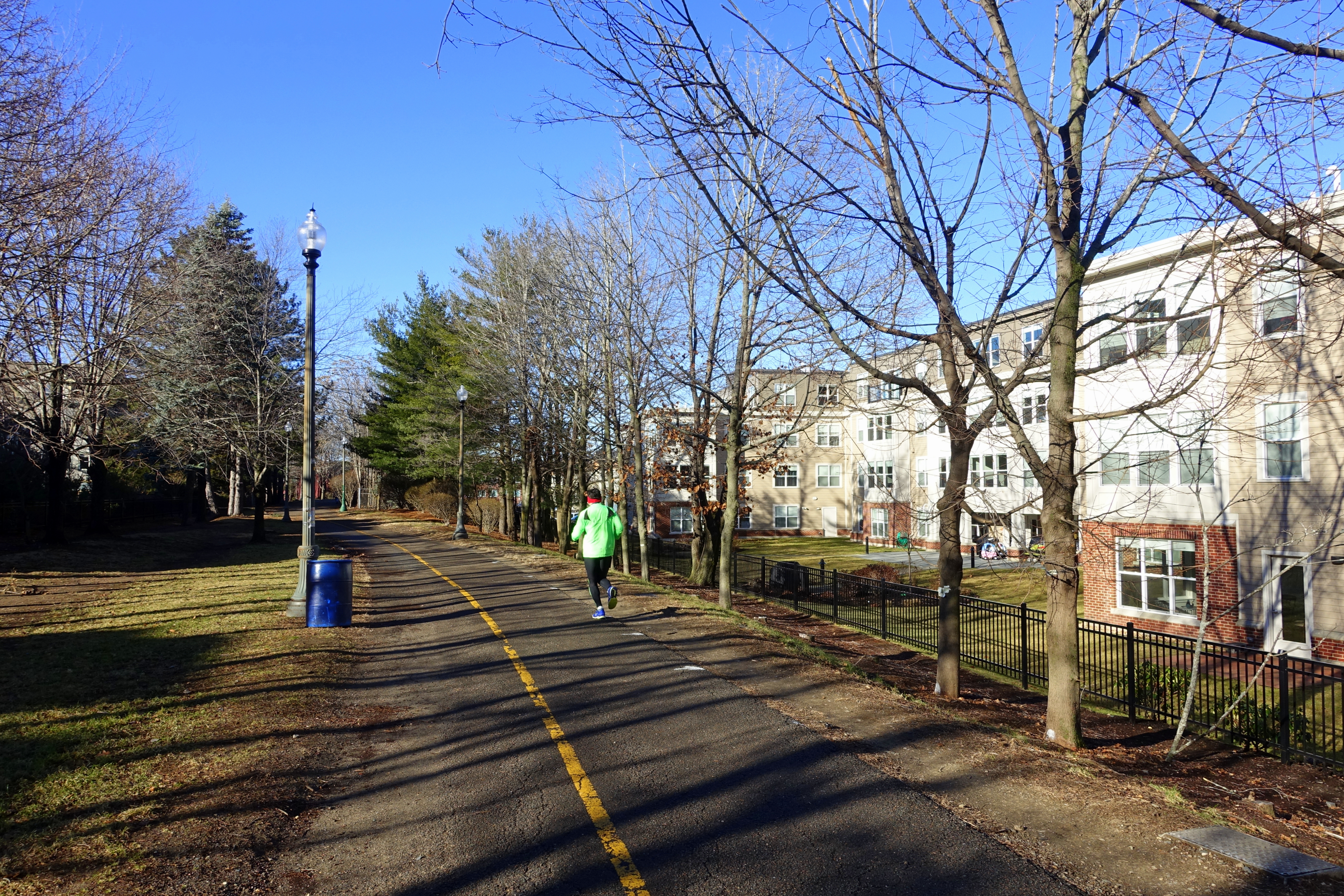
A typical section of the Alewife Linear Park

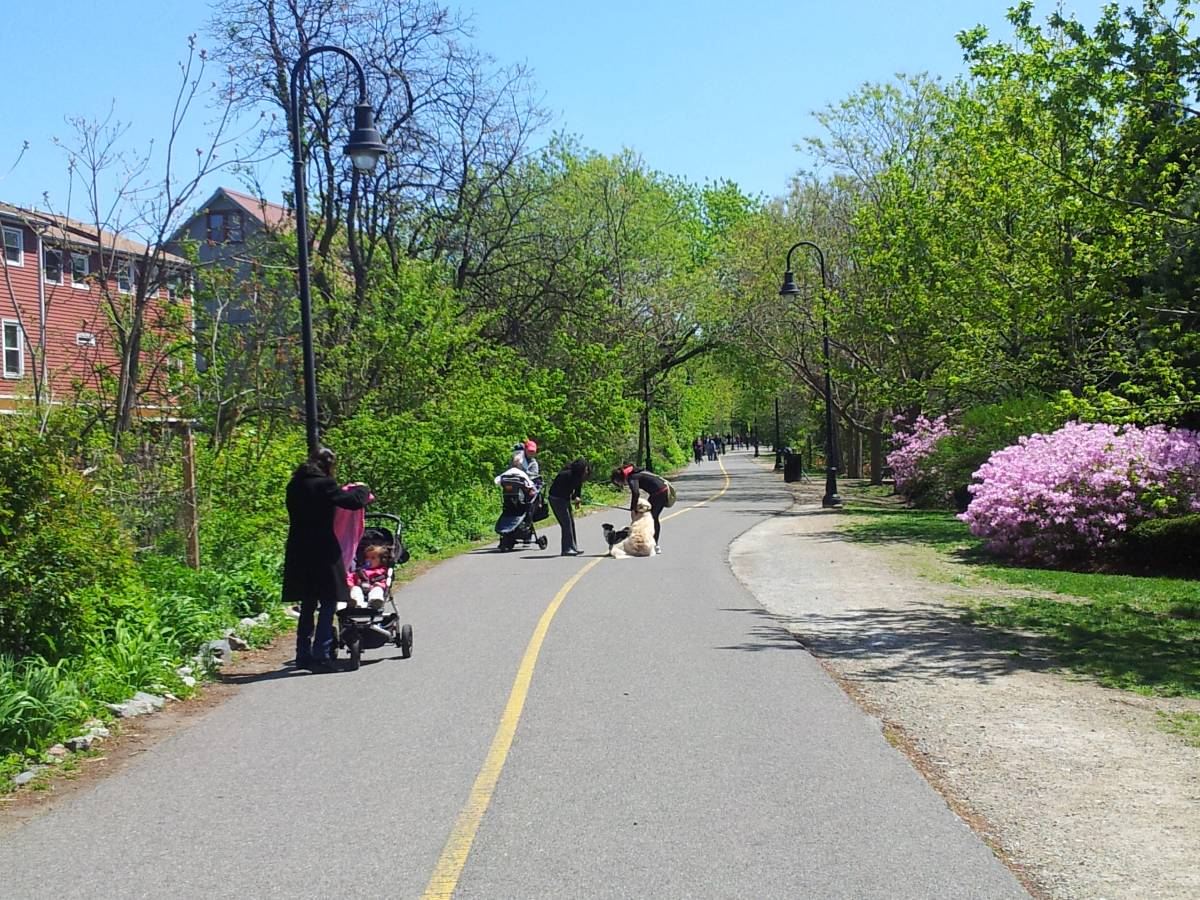
The 1992-built portion of the Somerville Community Path

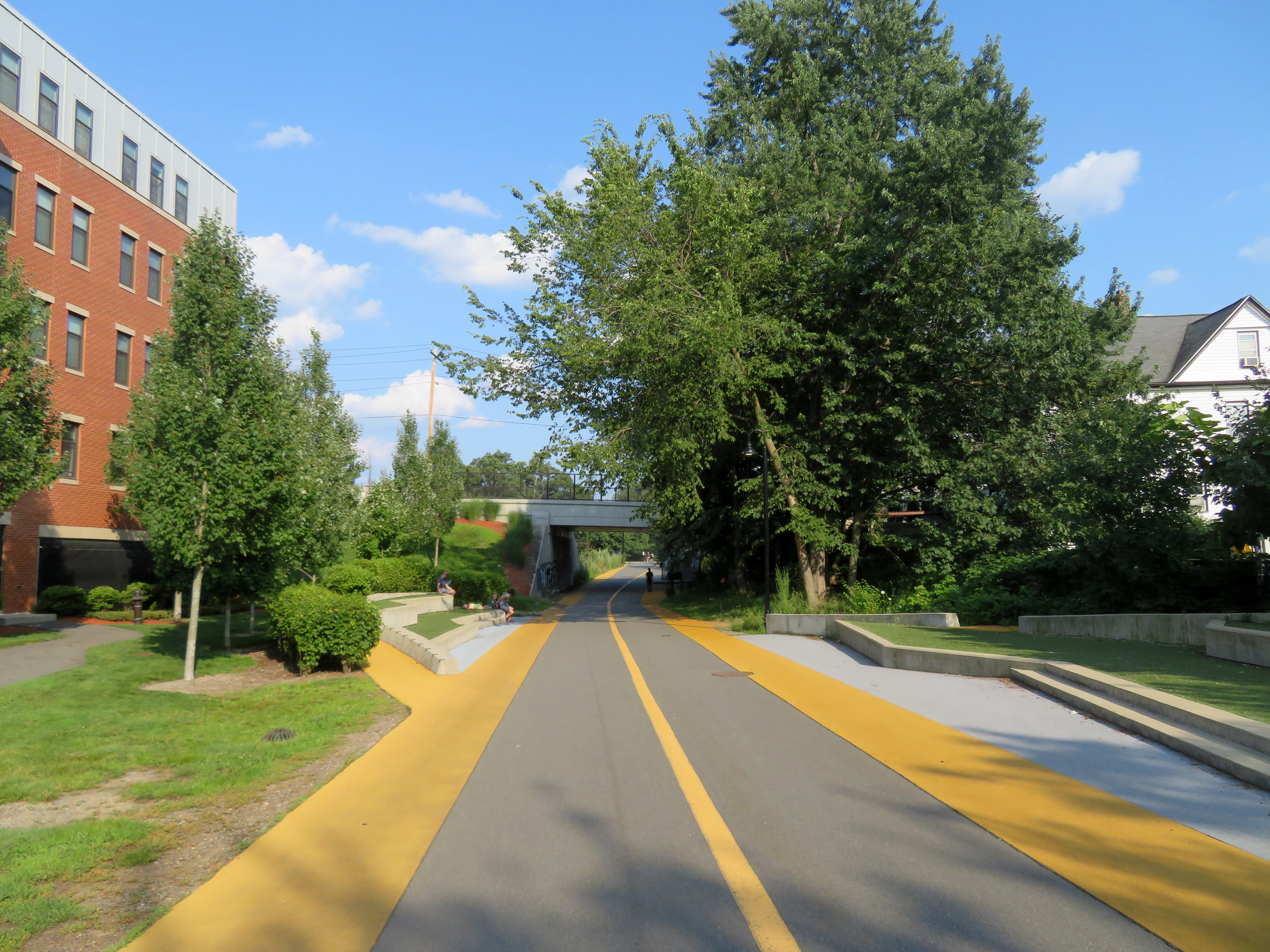
The 2015-built portion of the Somerville Community Path
