= Minuteman Bikeway =

Rail trail in Massachusetts, United States

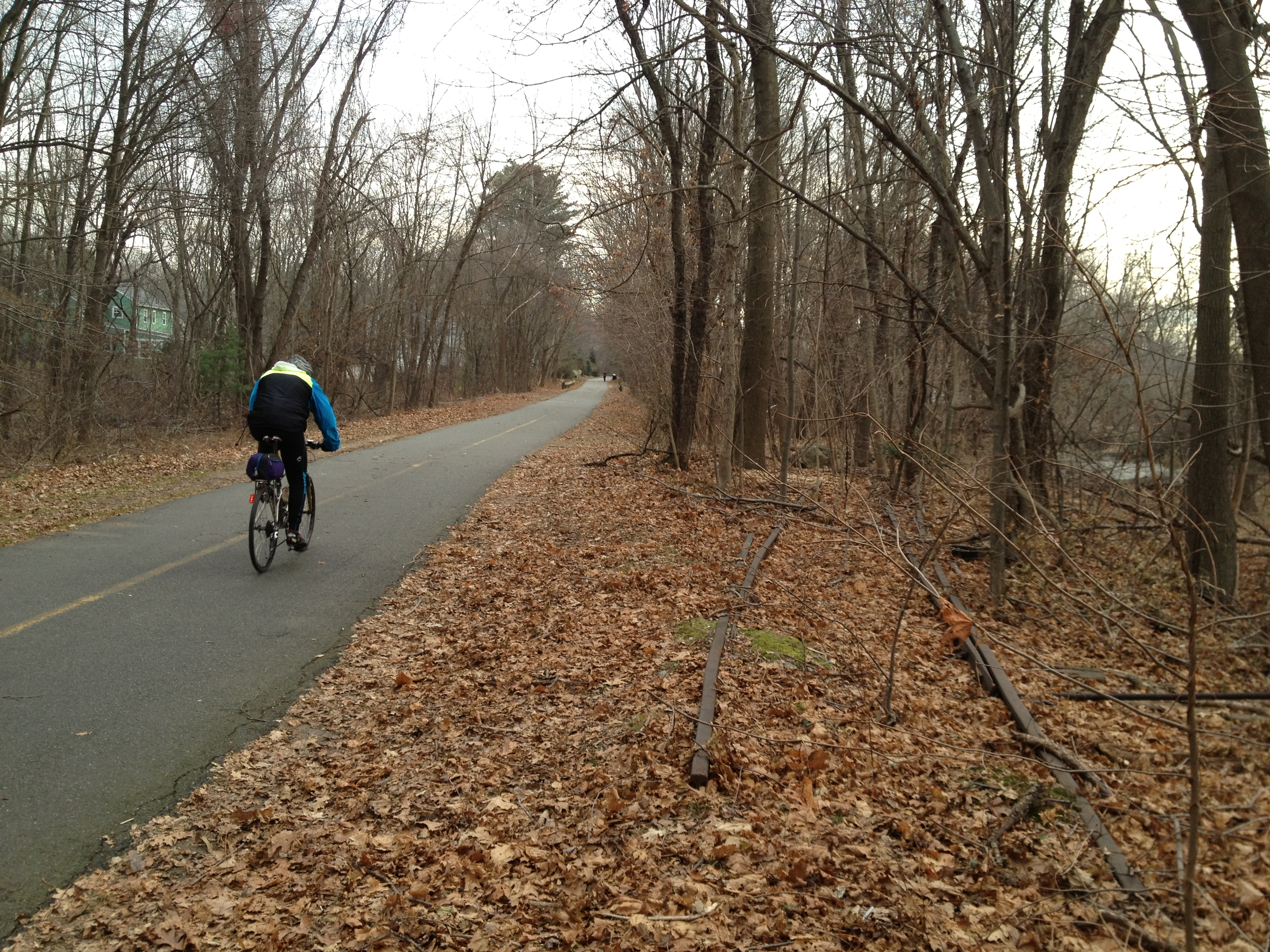
- The Minuteman Commuter Bikeway in Lexington, with abandoned tracks from former use as a rail line
- Began construction: 1991
- Completed: 1998
- Use: Bicycling, walking, jogging, inline skating, cross-country skiing
- Difficulty: Easy
- Season: Year-round
- Surface: Paved
- Right of way: former Lexington and West Cambridge Railroad, former Middlesex Central Railroad
- Maintainer: Bedford, Lexington, Arlington, Cambridge
- Website: http://minutemanbikeway.org/
Trail map

The Minuteman Bikeway, also known as the Minuteman Commuter Bikeway, is a 10-mile (16-kilometre) paved multi-use rail trail located in the Greater Boston area of Massachusetts. It runs from Bedford to Alewife station, at the northern end of the Red Line in Cambridge, passing through the towns of Lexington and Arlington along the way. Also along the route are several notable regional sites, including Alewife Brook Reservation, the Cyrus Dallin Art Museum, Spy Pond, "Arlington’s Great Meadows" (actually located in Lexington), the Battle Green in Lexington, and Hanscom Air Force Base.

At its Cambridge terminus, the bikeway connects with four other bike paths:

- the Fitchburg Cutoff Path going west
- the Alewife Linear Park which, in turn, leads east to the Somerville Community Path.
- the Alewife Brook Greenway going northwest, a connection to the Mystic River bike path following Alewife Brook. The Alewife Brook extension received $4M from the American Recovery and Reinvestment Act of 2009 as the "Minuteman Bikepath Connector" project.
- a sidewalk path going south to Fresh Pond Reservation and the Watertown Cambridge Greenway

The Somerville Community Path was extended to downtown Boston in the summer of 2023, creating a much larger continuous bikeway accessible from the Minuteman.

At the Bedford end, the Minuteman Bikeway connects with the Narrow Gauge Rail Trail and the Reformatory Branch Rail Trail.

== History ==
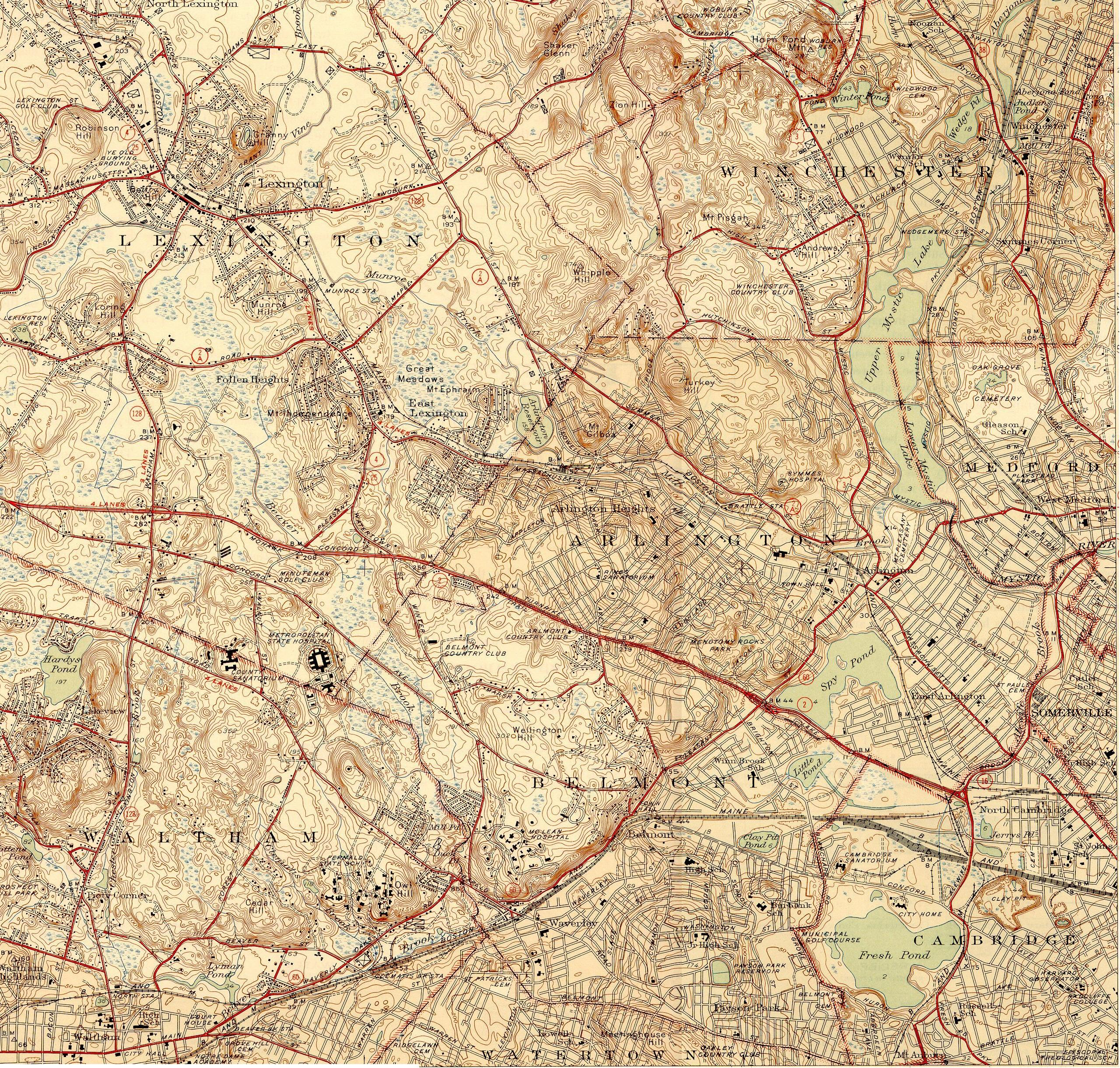
Map from 1946, where Boston & Maine Railroad (B&M) passes along the route of today's Minuteman Bikeway

The path comprising the current Minuteman Bikeway has a long history. The trail closely approximates the route that Paul Revere took on his famous ride in 1775, which heralded the beginning of the American Revolution.

Along the way to becoming a railroad, the path's right-of-way (ROW) was laid out east of Lexington in 1846 by the Lexington and West Cambridge Railroad and west of Lexington in 1873 by the Middlesex Central Railroad. Part of the original track can be seen in Arlington, near Uncle Sam Plaza in front of the Cyrus Dallin Art Museum.

A concept to convert the rail corridor into a commuter bicycle path was first proposed in 1974, three years before passenger rail service was discontinued, and a full seven years before rail service was discontinued altogether (in 1981). In 1991, the final plan for the conversion was approved, and construction started on the original section of the bikeway. The corridor was railbanked in July 1992. The Arlington–Lexington section of the path was dedicated in September 1992; the Lexington–Bedford segment was delayed by water main construction and opened in May 1993. In 1998, the bikeway was extended a short distance from East Arlington to Alewife station in Cambridge.

In 2002, it was repaved in Arlington and in 2004, the Bedford Depot Park Enhancement Project was completed at its western terminus. In 2008, the bikeway was the fifth inductee into the national Rail-Trail Hall of Fame by the Rails-to-Trails Conservancy.

The property is currently owned by the Massachusetts Bay Transportation Authority and leased to the municipalities through which it passes on an interim basis as the ROW is railbanked. The MBTA at one point planned to use this ROW to extend the Red Line to Arlington Center and Arlington Heights.

The crossing of the path through Arlington Center was rebuilt in 2017 to be less discontinuous.

== Uses ==
Area residents use the bikeway for a host of activities, including bicycling, walking, jogging, and inline skating. The main use of the path, however, is for casual biking. In the winter there is often enough snow on the bikeway for cross-country skiing. However, it is now plowed from Alewife Station to Bedford. No motorized vehicles are allowed except for powered wheelchairs and emergency vehicles.

== Future possibilities ==
New connections under contemplation include one from Lexington to the Battle Road Trail and one to the Charles River bike path via Fresh Pond Reservation and the abandoned Watertown Branch Railroad. The Watertown Cambridge Greenway was completed in 2022.

In April 2014, state officials announced that the Somerville Community Path would be extended alongside the Green Line Extension, creating a continuous 4.5 mile route from the Minuteman Bikeway to Boston’s Charles River Bike Path. Officials had contemplated abandoning the path portion of the GLX in order to save costs, but after hiring new management, a contractor agreed to the parallel path while still cutting costs. The extension was completed in the summer of 2023.

== Gallery of views along the bikeway ==
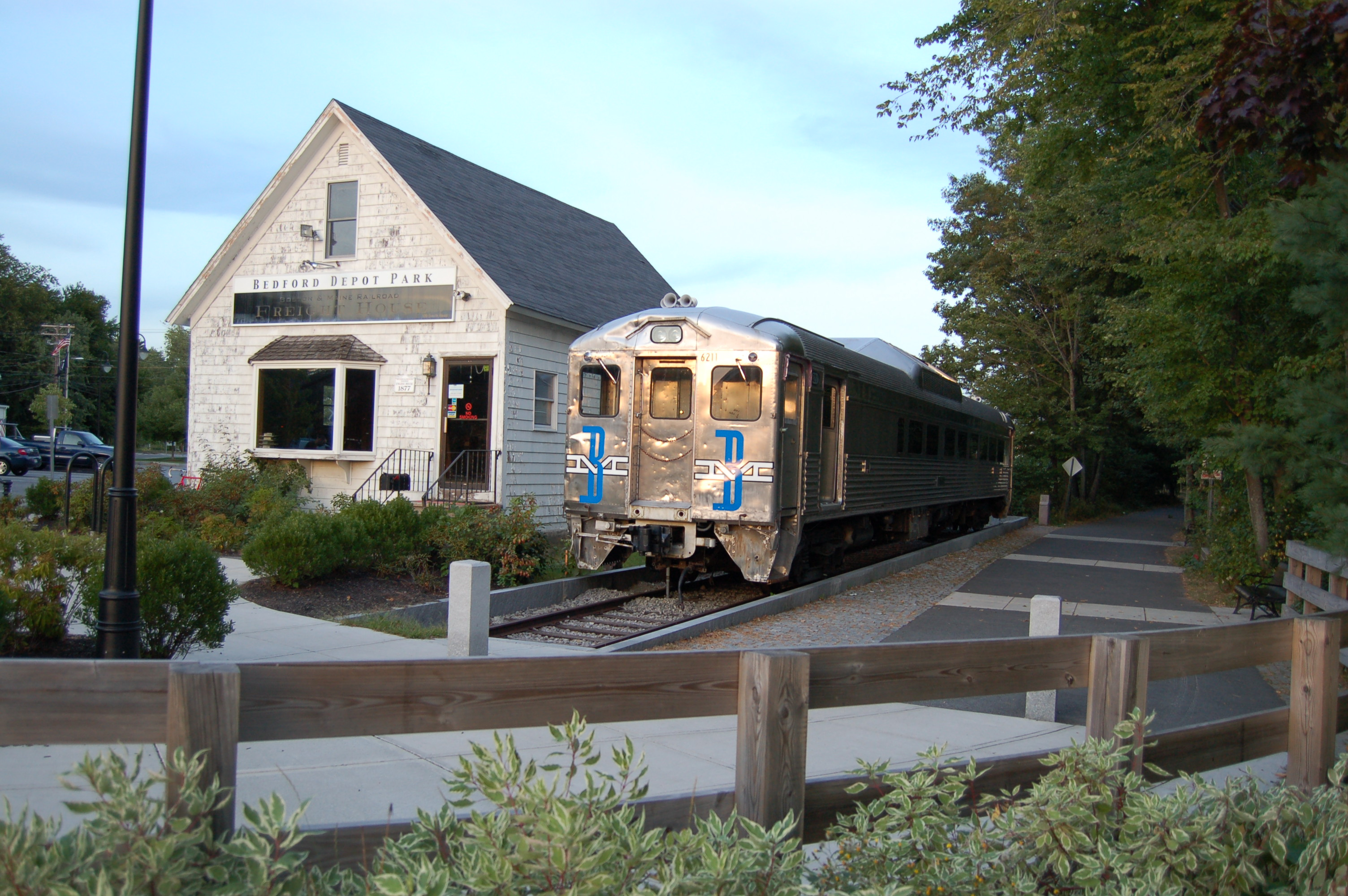
Bedford Depot Park, with B&M RDC

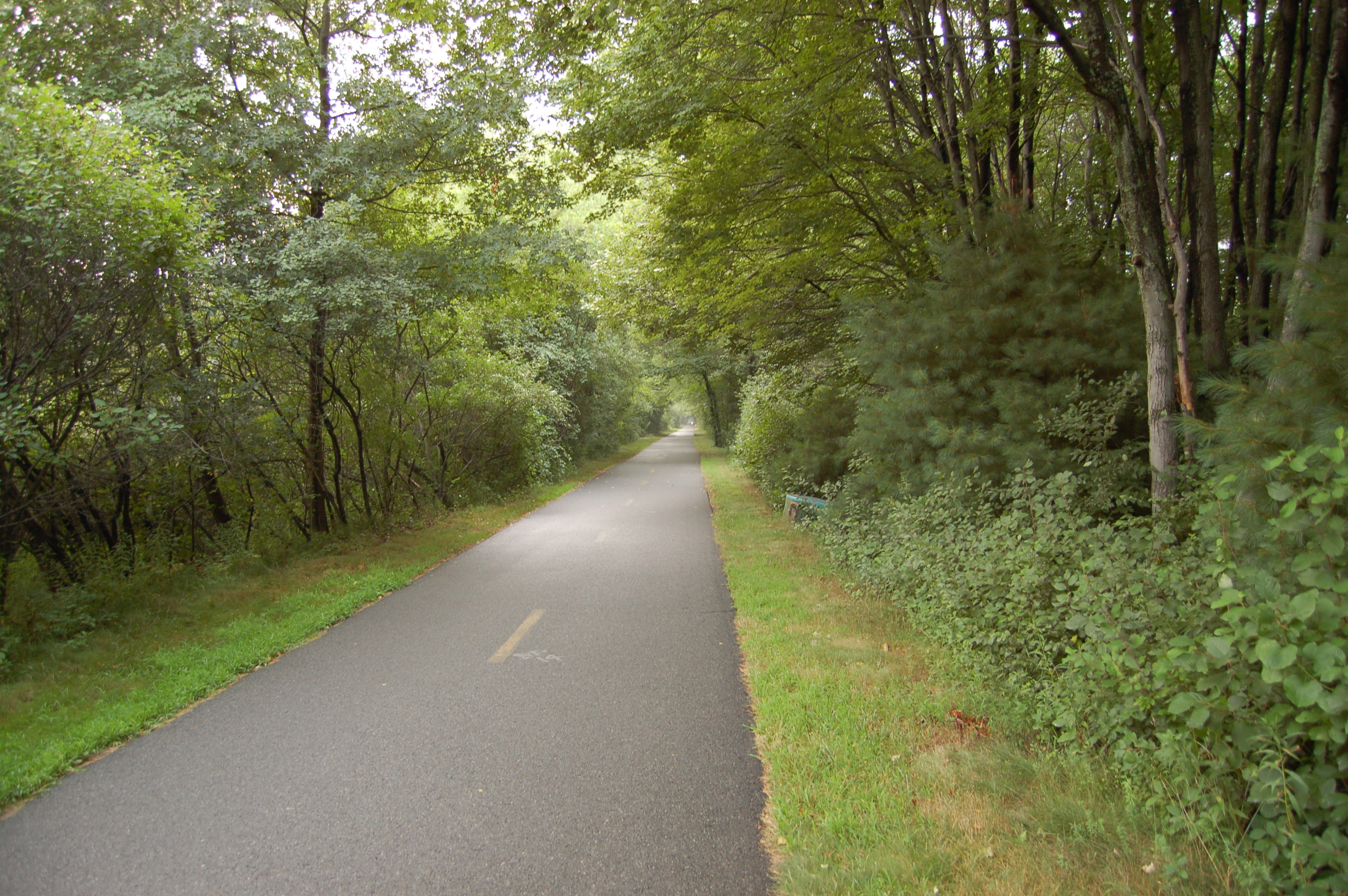
In Bedford, near Wiggins Avenue

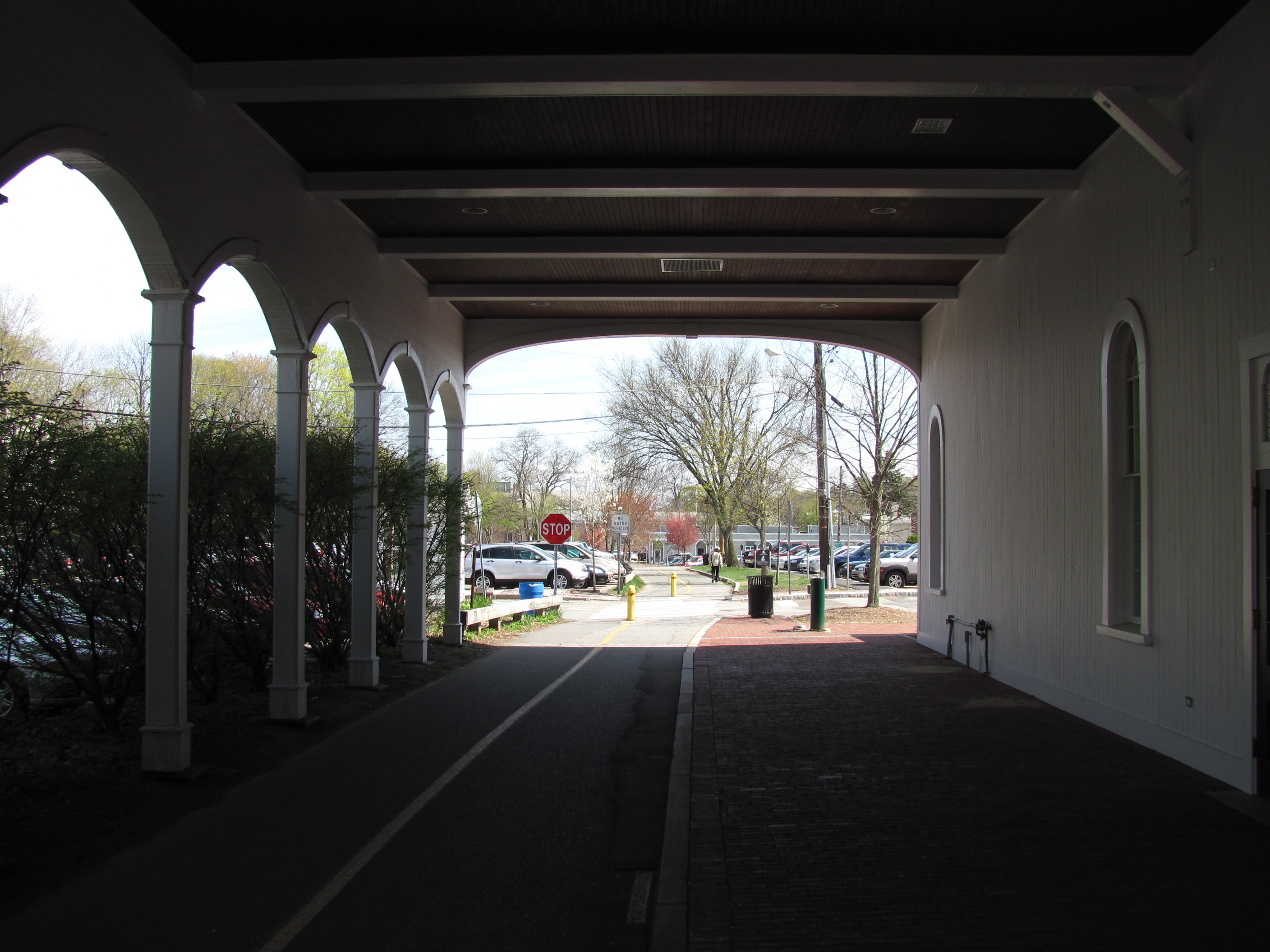
Lexington Depot

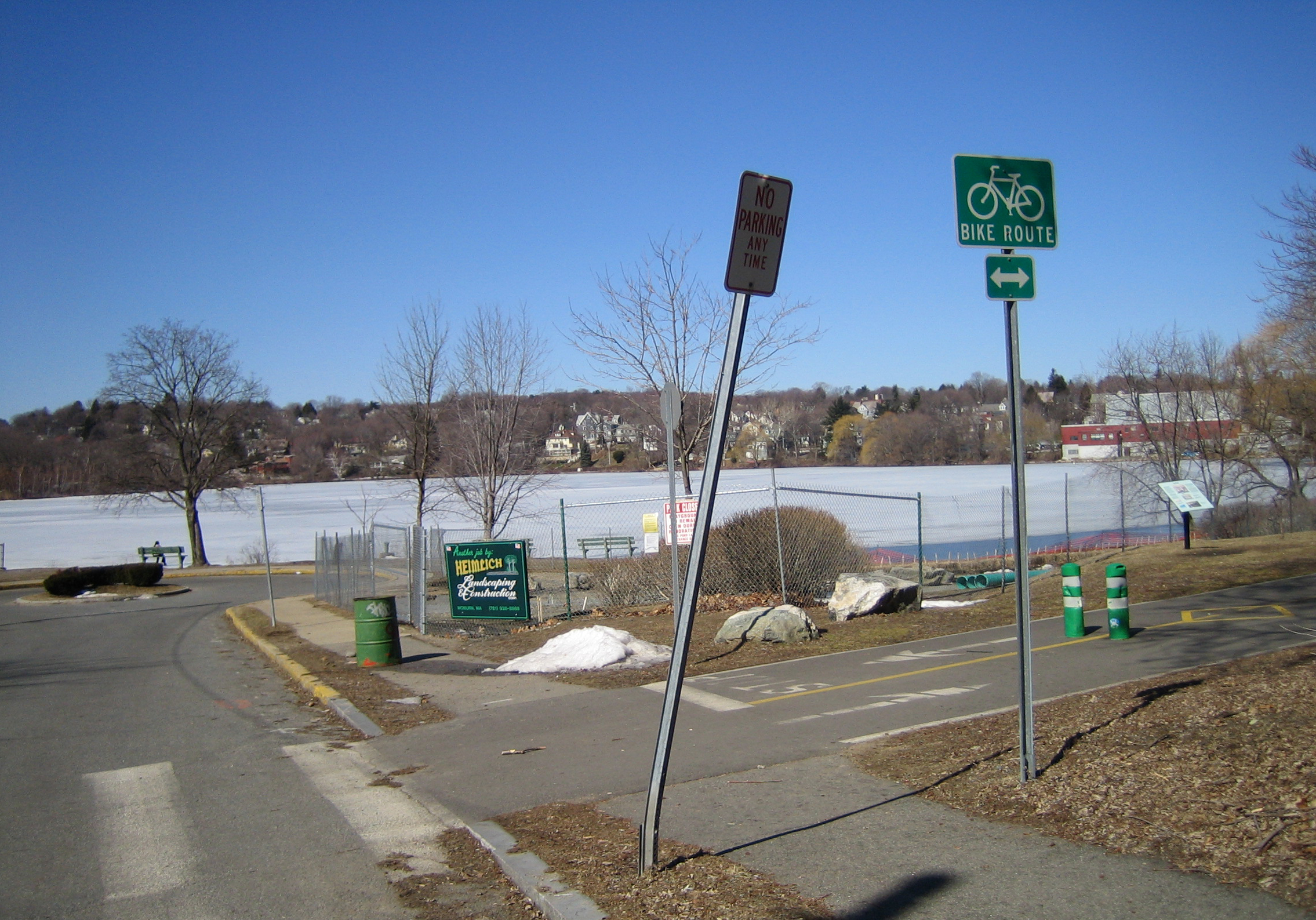
Spy Pond, Arlington

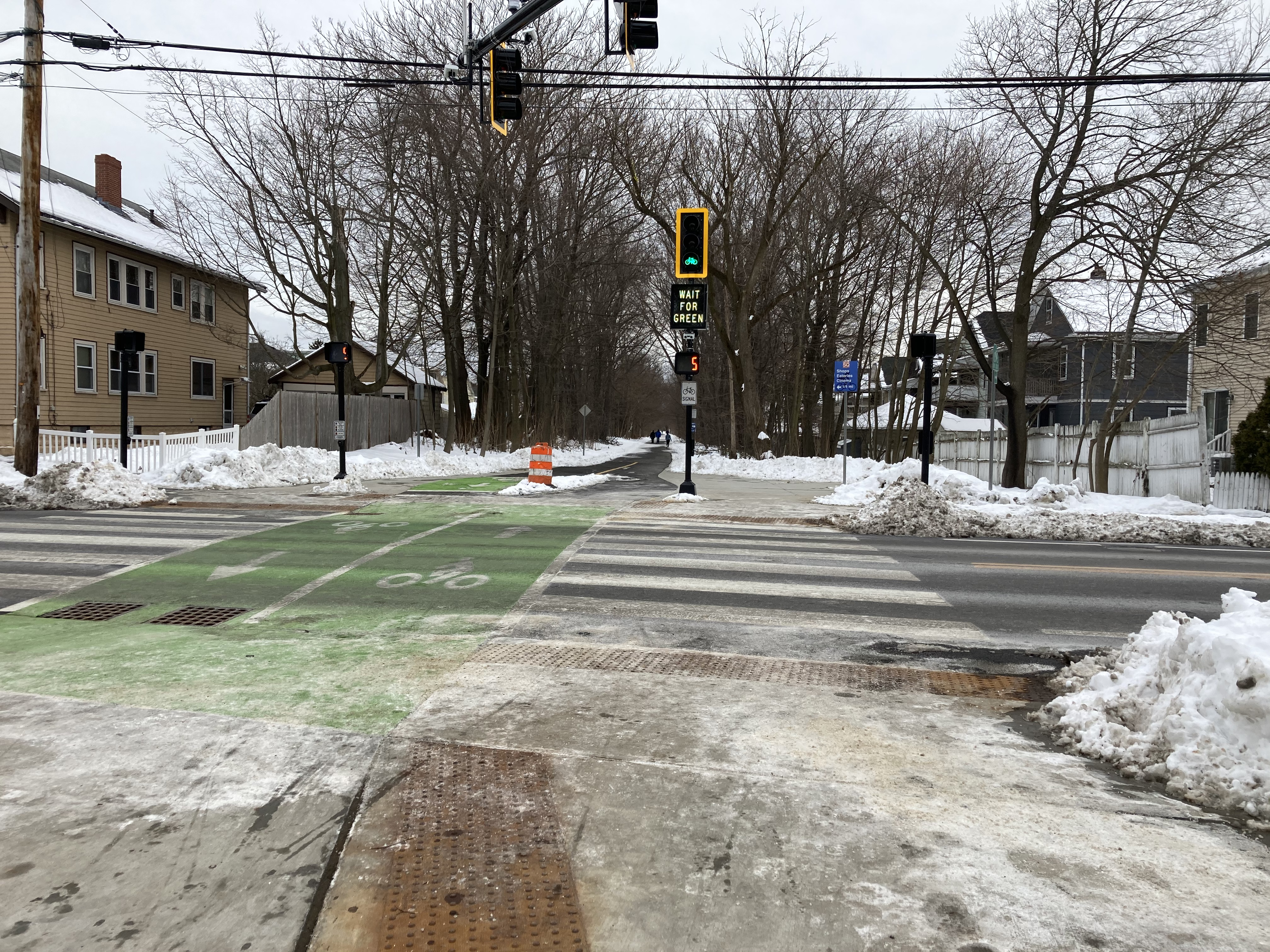
At Lake Street Intersection, Arlington

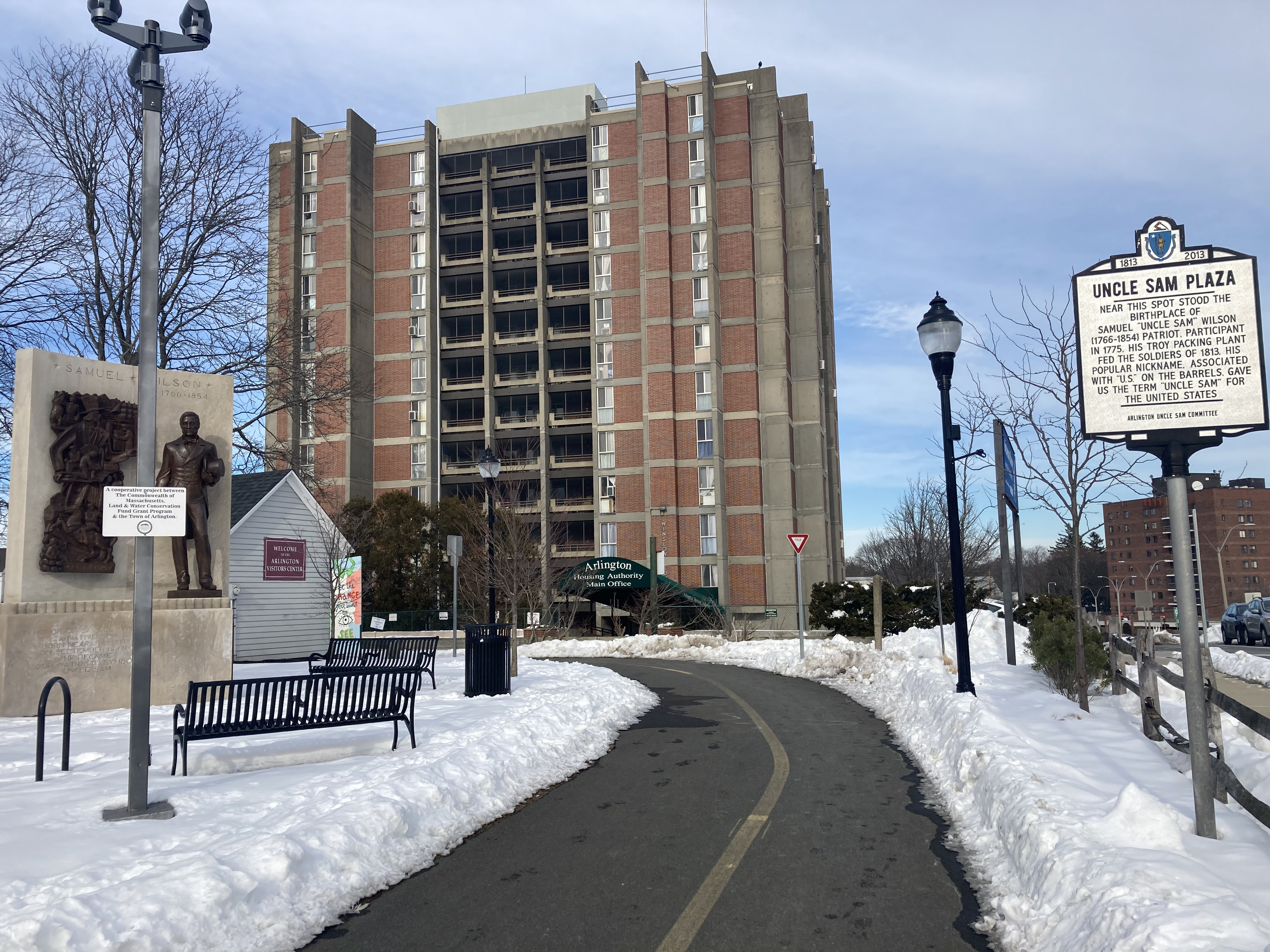
At Uncle Sam Plaza

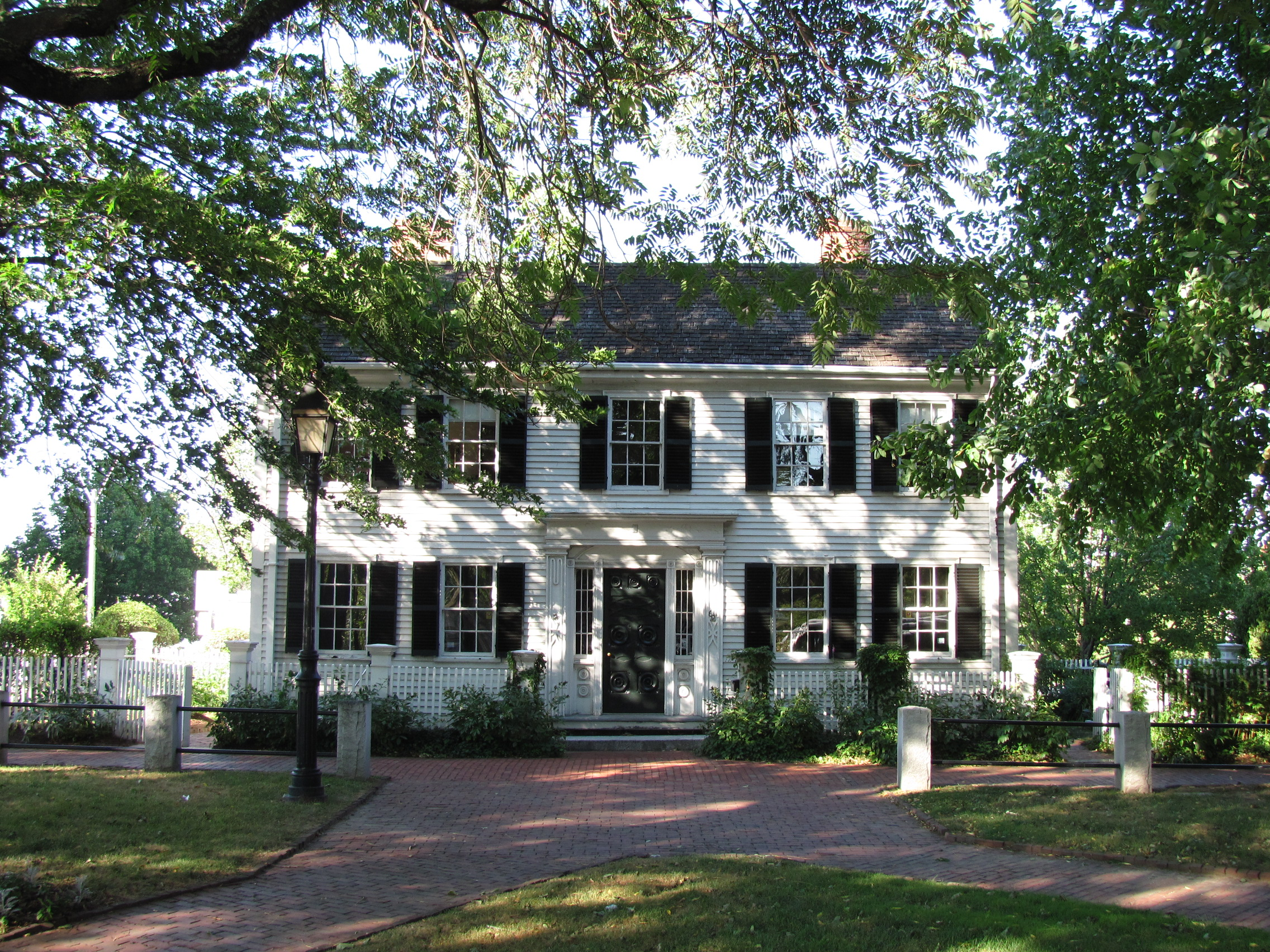
Cyrus E. Dallin Art Museum, Arlington MA

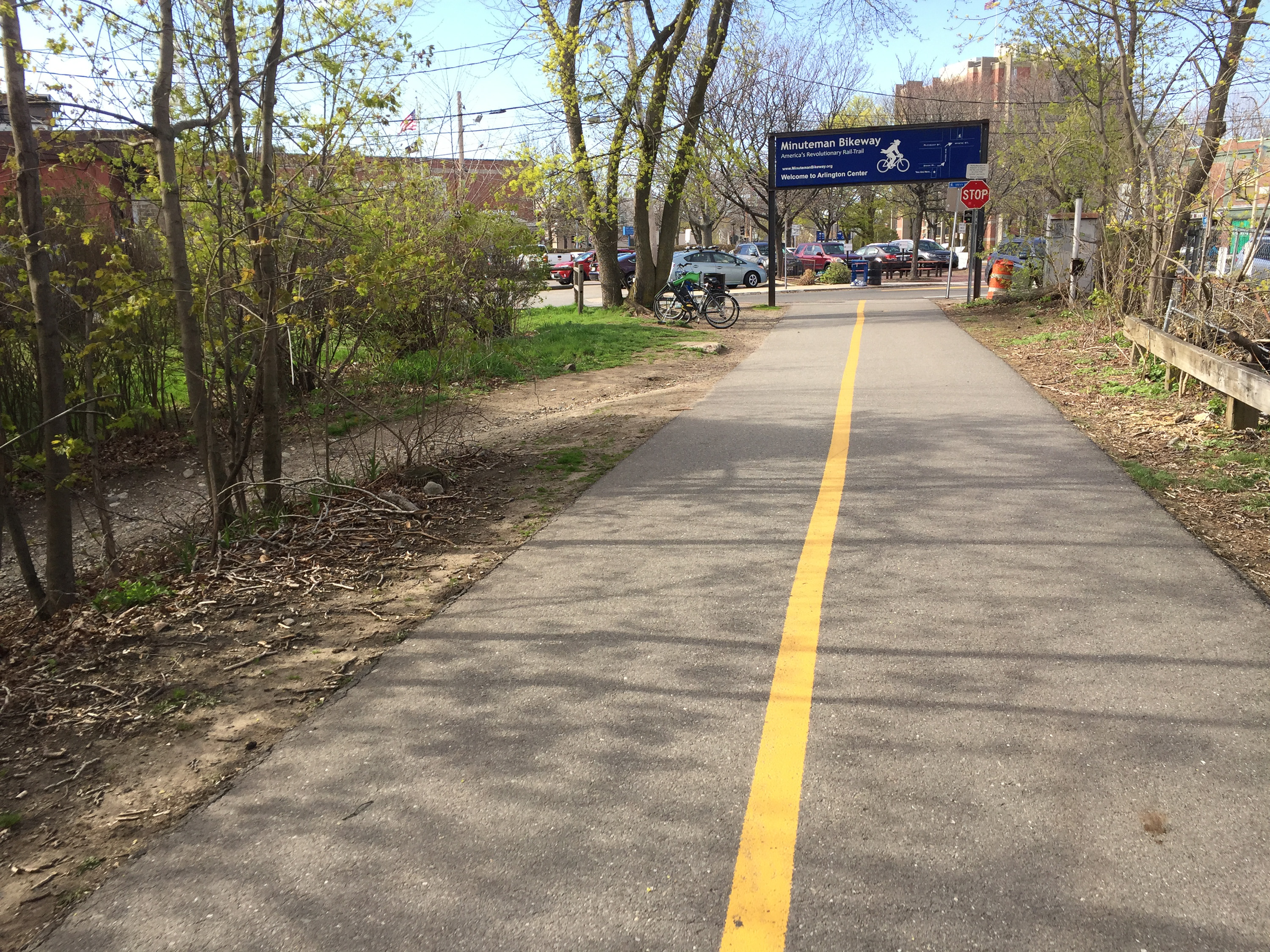
At Arlington Center

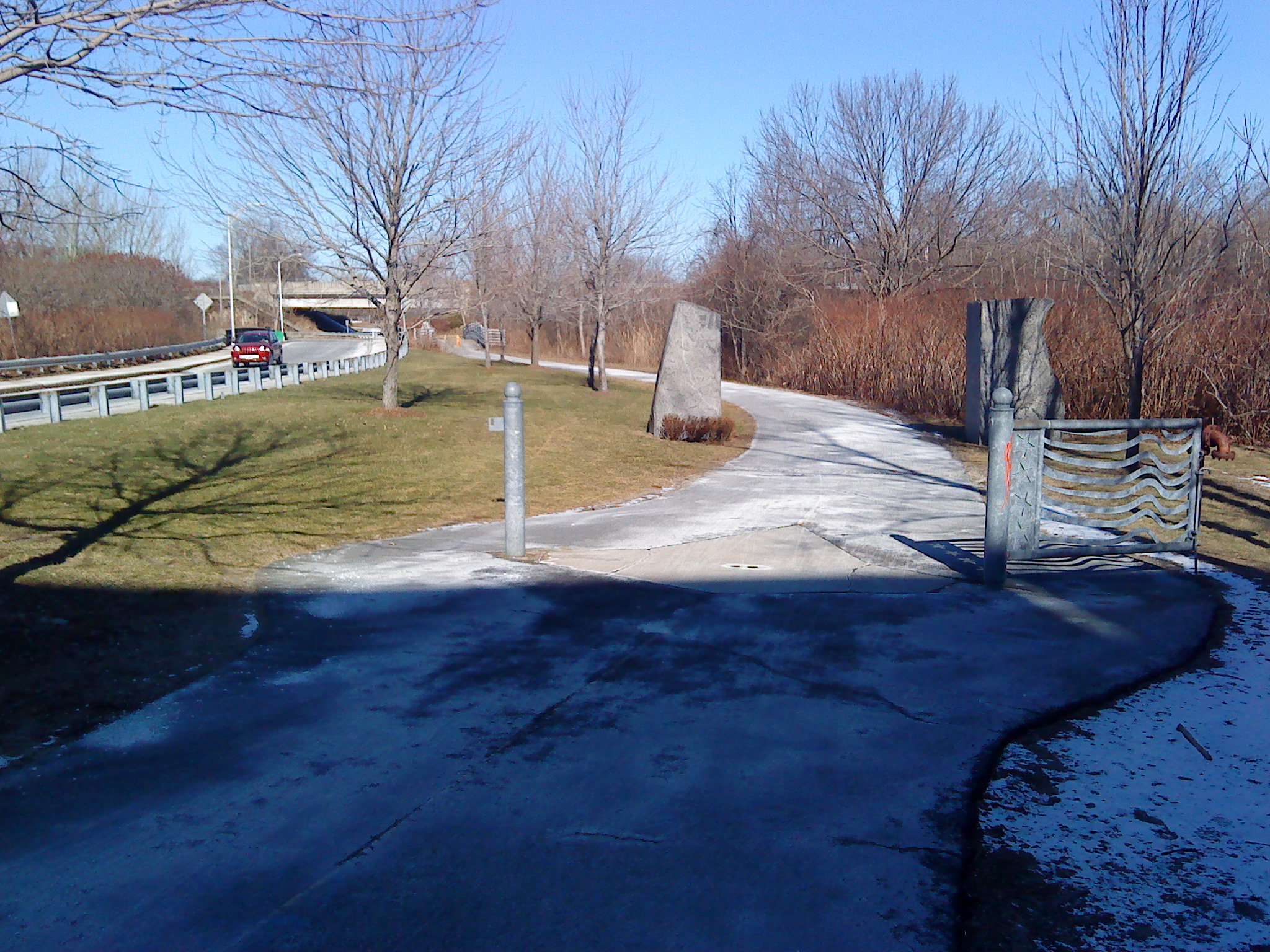
In Cambridge, near Alewife station and the junction with the Fitchburg Cutoff Path

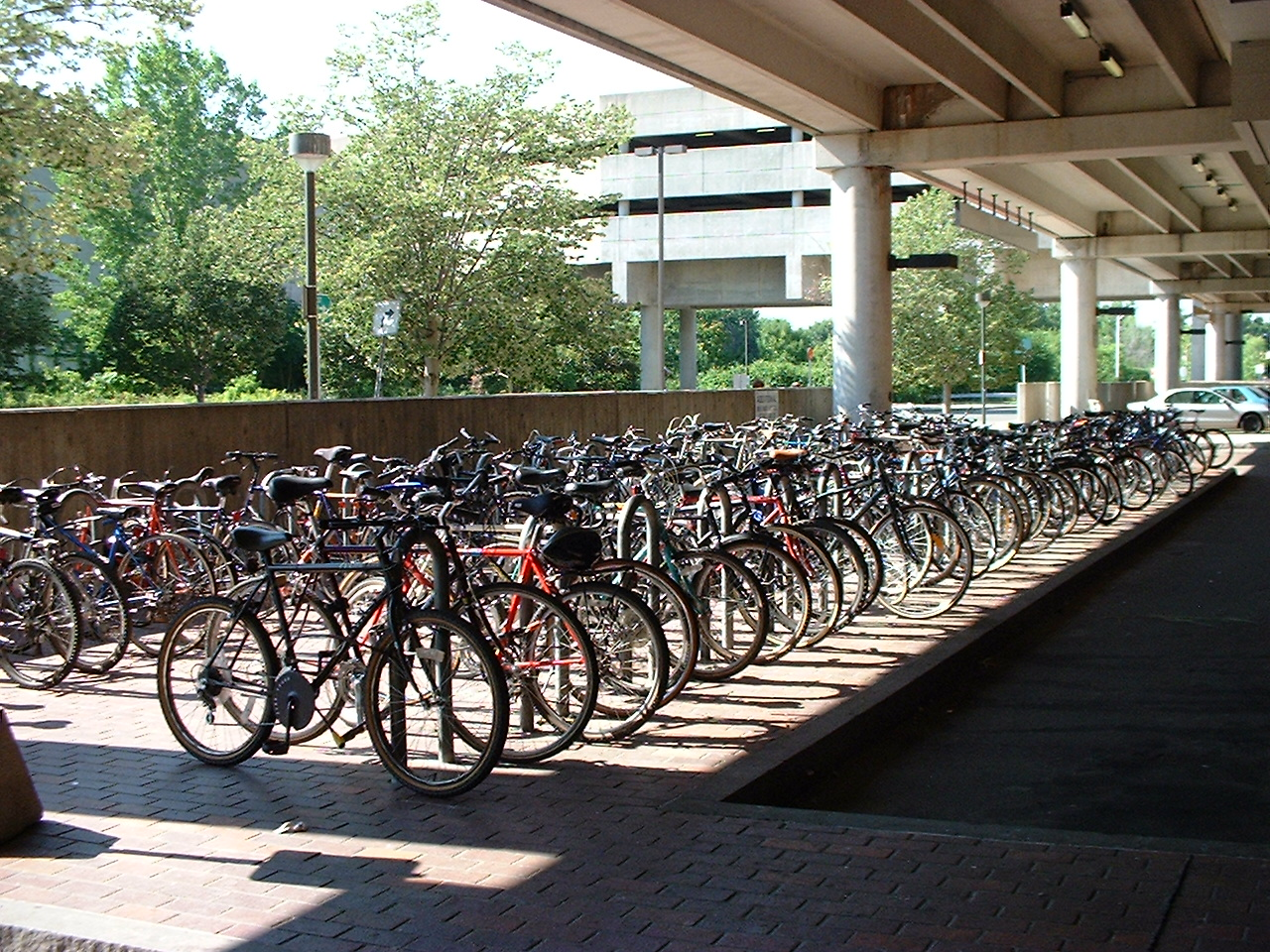
Bike parking at Alewife station

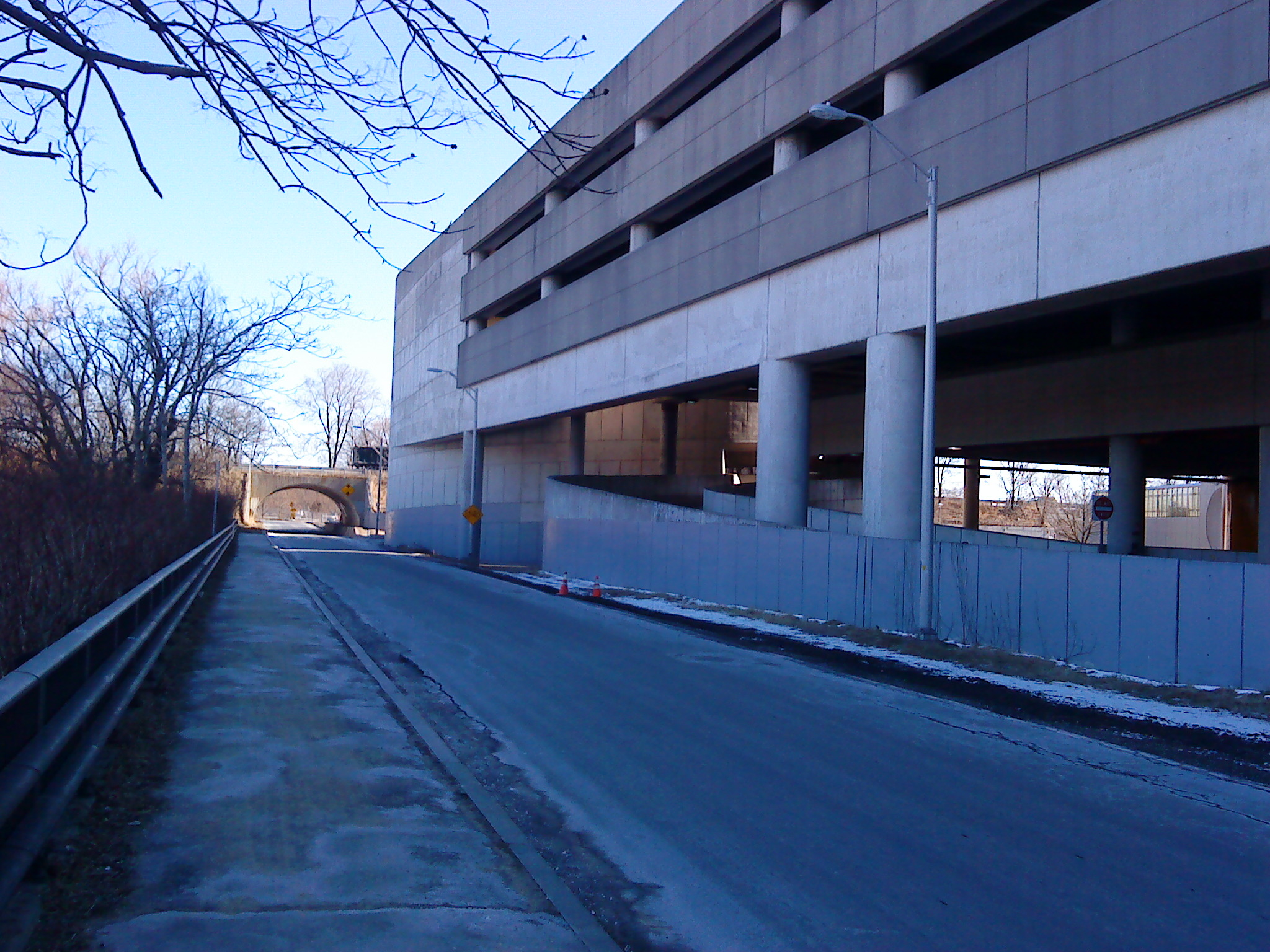
Connector to Cambridge Linear Park

== See also ==
- Minutemen
- Uncle Sam Memorial Statue
- Railbanking
