= Community Preservation Act =

The Community Preservation Act (CPA) is a Massachusetts state law (M.G.L. Chapter 44B) passed in 2000. It enables adopting communities to raise funds to create a local dedicated fund for open space preservation, preservation of historic resources, development of affordable housing, and the acquisition and development of outdoor recreational facilities.

Funds are raised locally for these purposes through imposition of a voter-authorized surcharge on local property tax bills of up to 3%. Several exemptions to the CPA surcharge can also be authorized by voters at the time of adoption. Local adoption of CPA by a community triggers annual distributions from the state's Community Preservation Trust Fund, a statewide fund held by the Massachusetts Department of Revenue, which the law also establishes. Deed recording fees charged by the state's Registries of Deeds are the funding source for the statewide Community Preservation Trust Fund. Revenues from these two sources—the local CPA property tax surcharge and annual distributions from the state's Community Preservation Trust Fund—combine to form a city or town's Community Preservation Fund.

== Details of the Law ==
Adoption of the CPA requires a two-step process: 1) initial approval by the local legislative body OR local certification of a ballot question petition with signatures of 5% of the registered voters of the community, followed by: 2) approval by the majority of the local electorate at a municipal ballot election. Communities must decide during the process of adoption what level of CPA property tax surcharge, up to 3%, to implement, and which of three possible exemptions to the CPA surcharge will be allowed. The voters then authorize, through their acceptance vote at the municipal election at which the CPA ballot question appears, this proposed surcharge level and exemptions.

Once a community has adopted the CPA, it is required to establish a local Community Preservation Committee, composed of from five to nine members, to administer the CPA program locally. There are five required members of a Community Preservation Committee, including a designated representative of each of the five following municipal boards: the Conservation Commission, the Historical Commission, the Planning Board, the Housing Authority and the Board of Park Commissioners. Communities can add up to four additional Community Preservation Committee members at their own discretion, drawn from the public, local government, or other municipal boards or committees. These can be elected or appointed positions, again, at the discretion of the community. The primary statutory responsibility of the Community Preservation Committee is to accept applications for, review, and recommend CPA projects to the community's local legislative body for approval. Only CPA projects that are approved by the local legislative body can receive funds from the community's Community Preservation Fund.

Communities may spend their CPA funds for projects in the following broad programmatic areas: Open Space, Historic Preservation, Affordable Housing and Outdoor Recreation. The CPA requires each adopting community to annually appropriate, or reserve for future appropriation, at least 10% of its estimated annual CPA fund revenues for open space projects (excluding recreational uses), 10% for historic preservation projects, and 10% for affordable housing projects. The remaining funds each year can be used on projects in any CPA programmatic area. The CPA statute describes in detail allowable uses of the funds within the four broad programmatic purpose areas, determining what projects are eligible for CPA funding.

As of July of 2026, 201 cities and towns (57% of the state's municipalities) have adopted the Community Preservation Act, and no community has ever revoked the program. Because of the rising number of communities participating in the program, legislation was passed in 2019 to increase the recording fees at the Registries of Deeds which provide revenue to the statewide CPA Trust Fund. This increase is expected to raise an estimated $60 million annually for CPA communities each year. (Communities that adopt CPA with the full 3% CPA surcharge are eligible to participate in two additional annual CPA fund distribution rounds each year, and the funding formula within the CPA law governing these rounds allows some smaller, less resource-rich communities to often receive a dollar-for-dollar annual match for CPA funds raised locally.)

As of June 30th, 2022, the Community Preservation Act has accomplished the following statewide:

- Over $2.65 billion has been raised for community preservation funding statewide
- 15,069 CPA projects have been approved by local legislative bodies
- More than 10,000 affordable housing units have been created with an additional 16,000 units supported
- 34,204 acres of open space have been preserved
- Over 6,700 appropriations have been made for historic preservation projects
- Over 3,300 outdoor recreation projects have been initiated
