= Somerville Community Path =

Rail trail in Somerville, Massachusetts

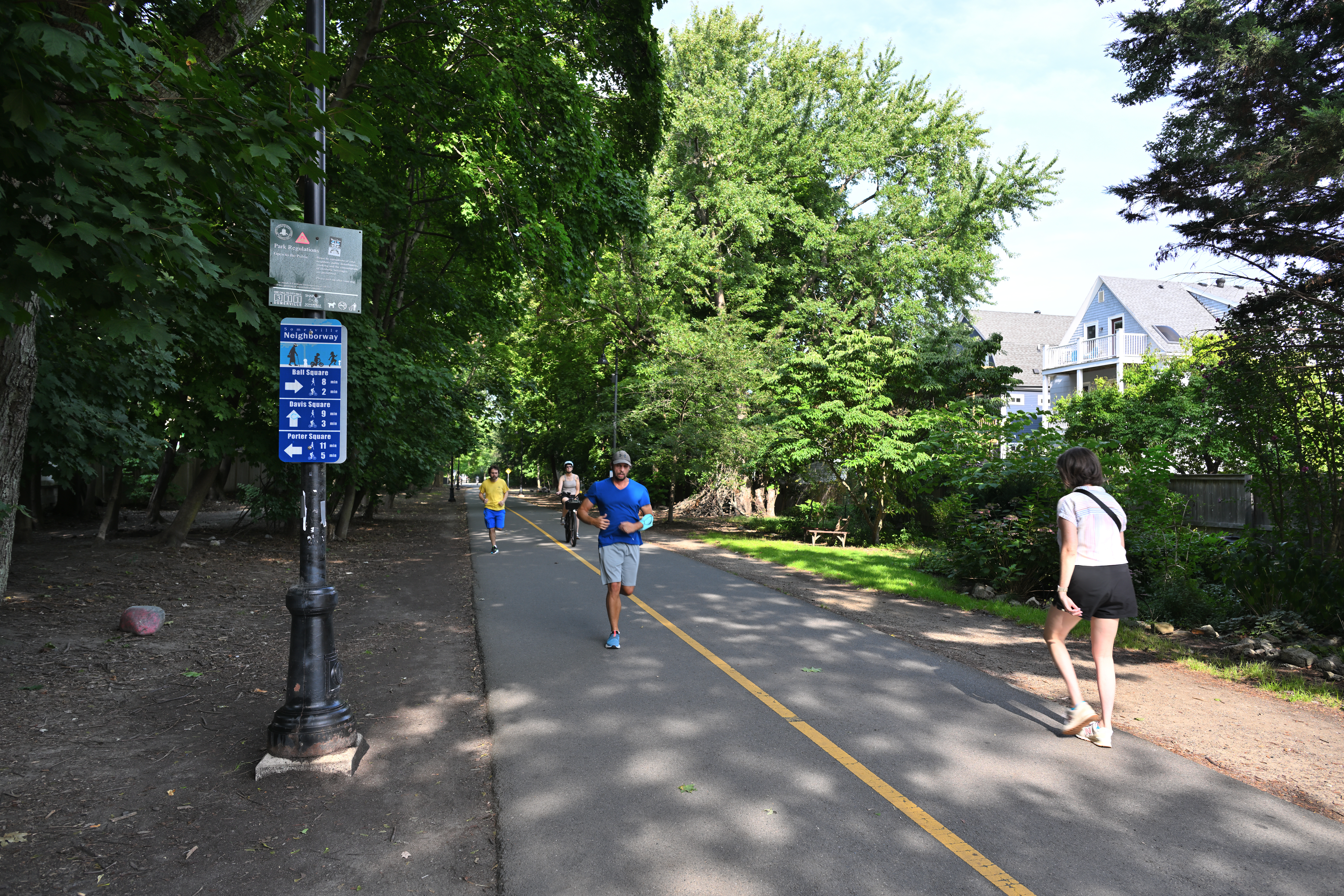
- A typical section of the Somerville Community Path
- Length: 3.2 miles (5.1 km)
- Began construction: 1985
- Completed: 2023
- Surface: Asphalt
- Right of way: Fitchburg Cutoff, Green Line Extension
- Maintainer: City of Somerville

Trail map
- Somerville Community Path

The Somerville Community Path is a paved rail trail in Somerville, Massachusetts, running 3.2 miles (5.1 km) from the Alewife Linear Park at the Cambridge/Somerville border to East Cambridge via Davis Square. The first portion opened in 1985 along part of the former Fitchburg Cutoff rail line. Extensions opened in 1994 and 2015. A further 1.9-mile (3.1 km) extension to East Cambridge opened in June 2023 as part of the Green Line Extension project. It is a section of the partially completed Mass Central Rail Trail.

== History ==
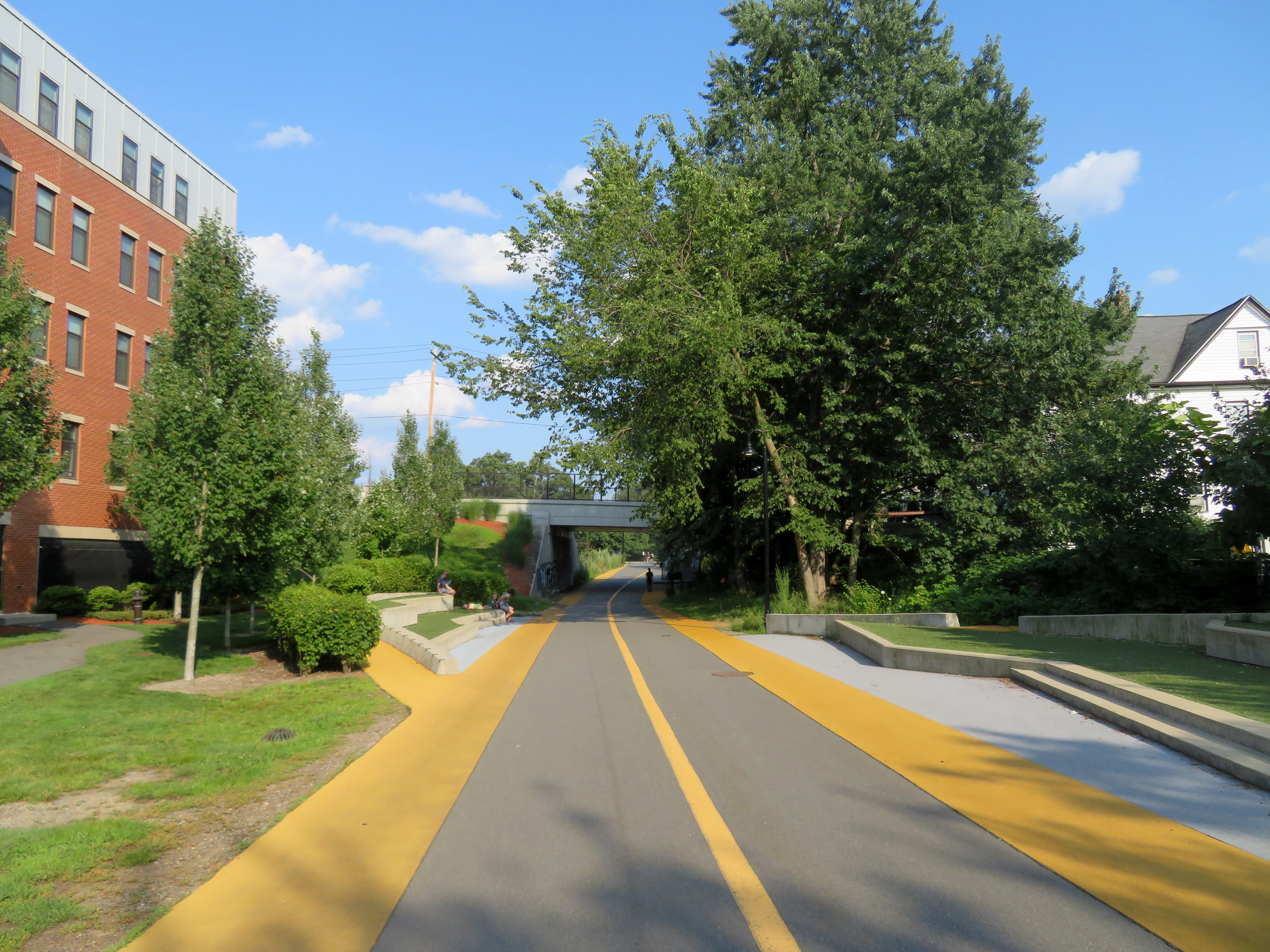
The 2015-opened section in 2019

The east part of the Fitchburg Cutoff opened in 1870, connecting the Lexington and Arlington Railroad (Lexington Branch) to the Boston and Lowell Railroad. Only used for Boston and Maine Railroad freight trains after 1926, the line was abandoned as far east as Cedar Street in 1979 to allow construction of the Red Line Northwest Extension. The Alewife Linear Park opened from Alewife to Davis in 1985. The Somerville Community Path opened 0.6 miles (0.97 km) from Davis Square to Cedar Street in 1994, with the 0.4-mile (0.64 km) Cambridge/Somerville border–Davis Square segment of the Alewife Linear Park becoming part of the Community Path. In 2013, construction began on a 0.3-mile (0.48 km) extension to Lowell Street. The $2.2 million extension opened in mid-2015, with an official dedication ceremony on August 19.

In April 2014, state officials announced that a 1.9-mile (3.1 km), $39 million extension of the Community Path to East Cambridge would be built as part of the Green Line Extension (GLX) project. Beginning in 2015, the state began a major re-evaluation of the GLX project due to significantly increased costs. In May 2016, the state indicated that the Community Path would only be built as far as Washington Street in the revised plan to avoid a costly bridge. In some sections, the path would be lowered to track level to eliminate costly retaining walls, resulting in fewer connections to cross streets than previously planned.

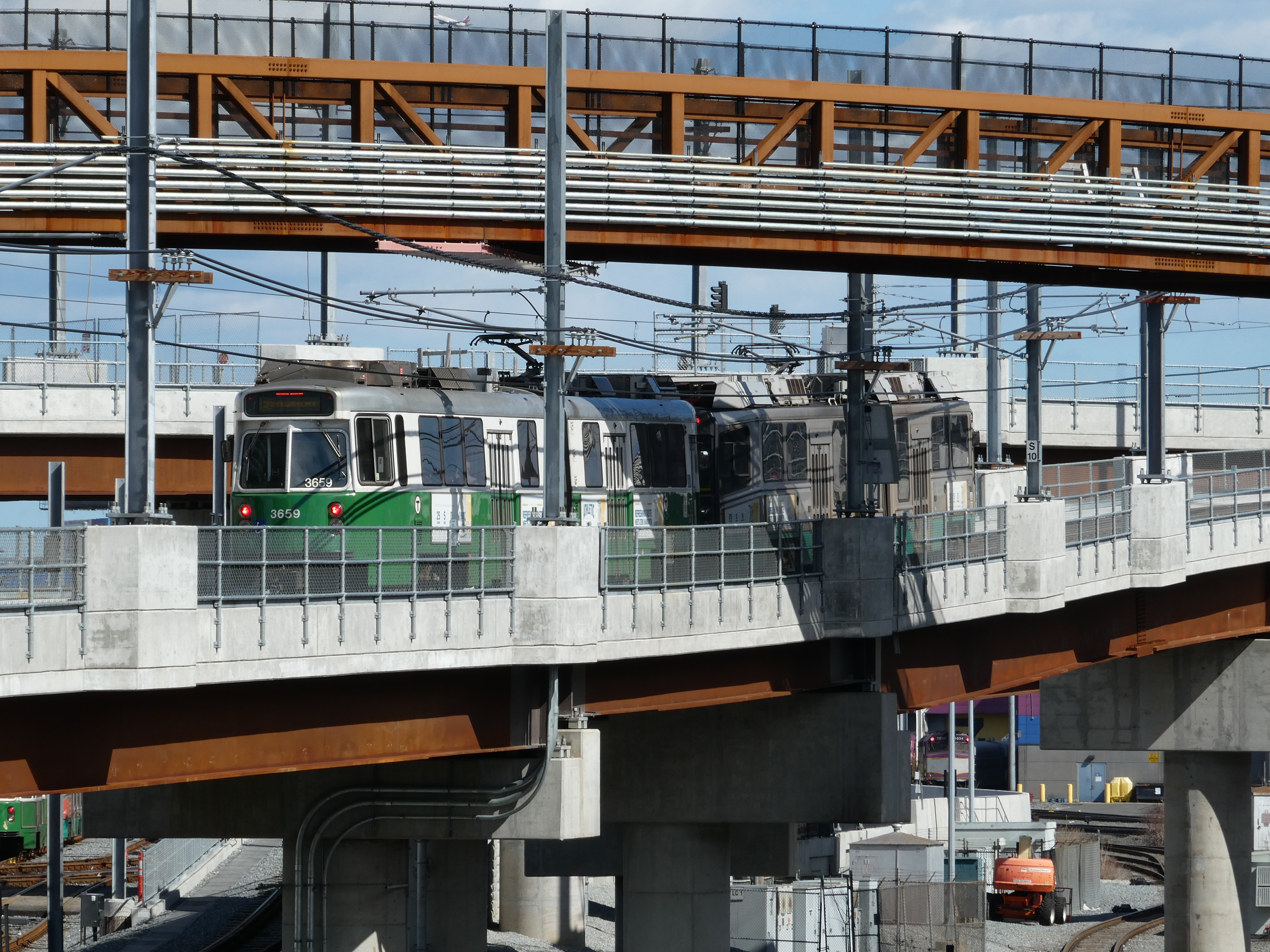
Truss bridge, top, carries the Community Path over the Green Line Extension and commuter rail tracks

A consortium called GLX Constructors was selected as the winner for re-bid project in November 2017. Their proposal reduced costs enough to add the full Community Path extension back into the plan. However, the plans call for a 10-foot (3.0 m)-wide path, narrower than existing portions and the 12-foot width recommended in federal guidelines. Cycling advocates have raised concerns about safety of the narrowed path given the expected levels of bicycle traffic. The GLX and path extension were expected to be completed in late 2021; with was delayed to mid-2022, then November 2022. The 1,400-foot (430 m)-long bridge over the Fitchburg Line and Green Line reaches 50 feet (15 m) tall, with grades of 4.8% on the approaches.

The Medford Branch opened in December 2022, but the path remained closed. Somerville signed a lease agreement with the MBTA in February 2023. The extension opened on June 10, 2023. A separate project constructing Reavis Field for Somerville High School moved a small section of the path onto a protected on-street detour until October 18, 2023. The path extension is an example of rails with trails.

Two proposed projects would connect to the extension: the Mystic to Charles Connector north to the Mystic Greenways network, and the Grand Junction Multi-use Path south to the Charles River Bike Path.

== Community Art and Events ==
Several pieces of unsanctioned art adorn the path. Two 20-foot tall wooden giraffes and a wooden elephant made by local artist Hayward Zwerling are on the side of the path between Cedar and Lowell streets. An unsanctioned sculpture garden has been on the Davis Square section of the path since at least 2007, and includes a kid-friendly train table, memorial sculptures for deceased individuals, and "Ghost Bike" - a skeleton riding a fully-functional bicycle hanging from a tree.

An online joke election for "bike path mayor" was informally held in September 2025 between many pets and animals. Over 90 candidate lawn signs were placed on the side of the path by animal owners, and the Google Forms "ballot", displayed as a QR code on the path, listed over 70 candidate animals. The cat Minerva won the joke election, which attracted widespread news coverage.
