= Cambridge Highlands =

Human settlement in Cambridge, Massachusetts, US

Coordinates: 42°23′25″N 71°9′3″W

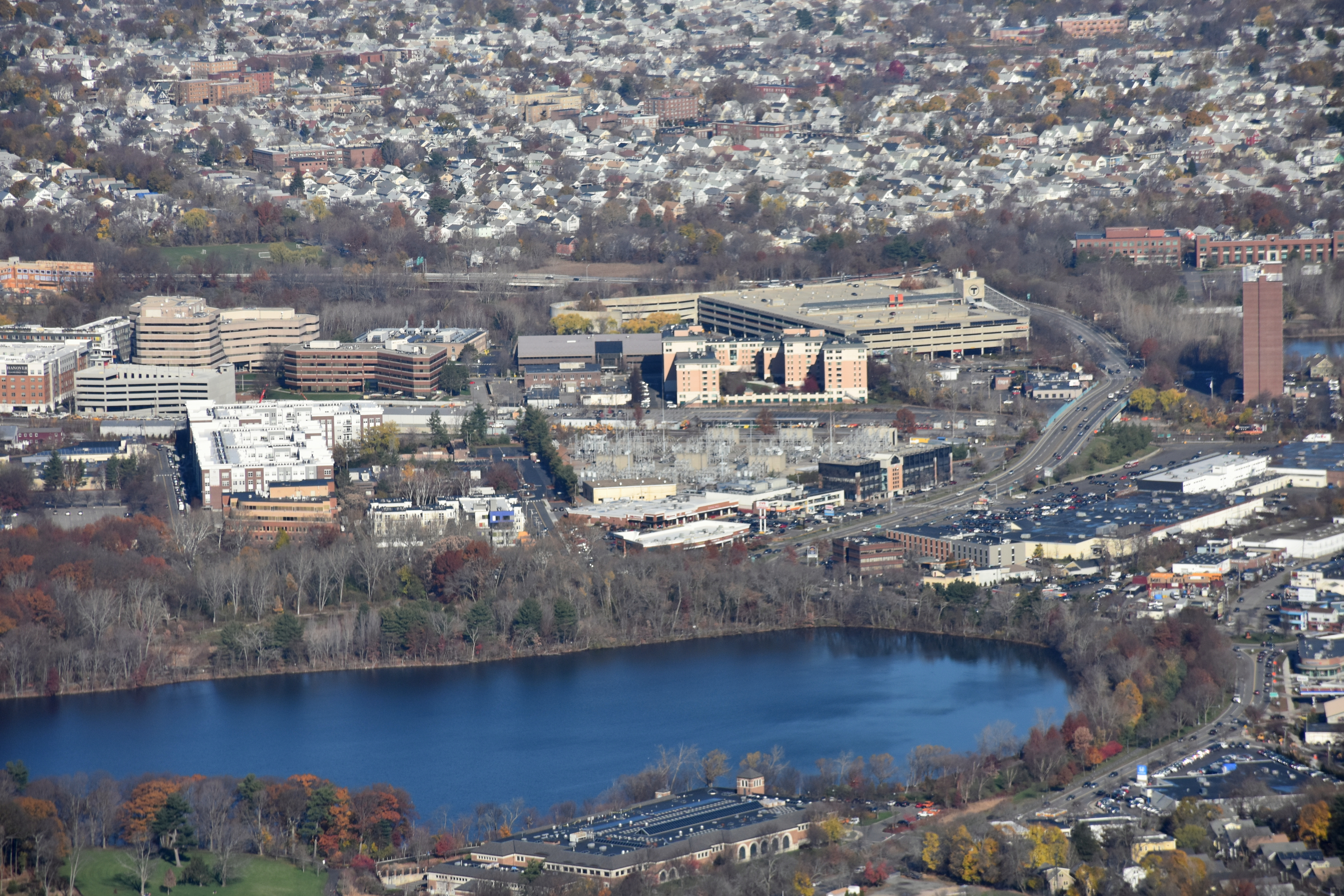
Aerial view of Cambridge Highlands in Cambridge, Massachusetts. Includes Alewife MBTA station and parts of Fresh Pond.

Cambridge Highlands also known as "Area 12", is a neighborhood of Cambridge, Massachusetts bounded by the railroad tracks on the north and east, the Belmont town line on the west, and Fresh Pond on the south. In 2023 it had a population of 1,660 residents living in 1,514 households, and the median household income was $104,629.

The street grid is internally disconnected, and the railroads, West Cambridge railyard, electrical substation, Alewife Brook, the Minuteman Bikeway, the Fitchburg Cutoff Path, MA-2 and two ponds block vast seamless full street grid access with other neighborhoods on the north, east, and south. The only through roads are the easterly-westerly Concord Avenue and north-south Alewife Brook Parkway in the east and Blanchard Road to the west. Public transit access includes Alewife Station on the northern side of the railroad tracks, and buses on Concord Avenue connecting to Harvard Square.

The area is largely industrial-commercial, with the Fresh Pond Mall and other stores on Alewife Brook Parkway. The mall includes a movie theater multiplex. Also in the neighborhood are BBN Technologies, E Ink Corporation, an office of the Social Security Administration, a Best Western hotel, the Olympia Fencing Center and a large electrical substation.

North of Concord Avenue and west of Alewife Brook Parkway a variety of light-industrial uses predominate, including Anderson & McQuaid Millwork, Longleaf Lumber's reclaimed wood warehouse and showroom, the scene shop of the American Repertory Theater, and the C.J. Mabardy disposal station, but since 2010 a steady encroachment of residential buildings has been occurring from the east. The Sancta Maria Nursing Facility and the private Fayerweather Street School are also situated in this area.

Near the Belmont line, a few streets in the neighborhood are mainly residential. There are also a few isolated houses on Concord Avenue, and a senior living center overlooking Fresh Pond; condominiums have gone up on Wheeler Street. In 2011, a developer purchased 70 Fawcett Street and was in the process of constructing a 428-unit residential complex.

Blair Pond, on the western edge of Cambridge Highlands, is part of Alewife Brook Reservation, which continues north of the Fitchburg Line.

To the southwest is the 155-acre Fresh Pond Golf Course which acts as a permeable sink for groundwater to recharge the reservoir.

== History ==
Originally, the area was merely swampland between Spy Pond and Fresh Pond, drained by Alewife Brook. What is now Concord Avenue was laid out sometime between 1805 and 1812 as the eastern part of the Cambridge and Concord Turnpike, proceeding directly from the new West Boston Bridge to the center of Concord, Massachusetts.

The Fitchburg Railroad opened in 1843, with stations on both sides of the wetlands (Blanchard Road and Brickworks). A spur to serve freight customers was constructed before the rest of the local street grid, explaining some of the unusual present-day property lines. It ran diagonally from northeast (near the bend in Fawcett Street) to southwest (terminating near customers on Concord Ave at Smith Place). As of 2013, abandoned sidings can still be found south of the Fitchburg main line, which presently carries MBTA Commuter Rail service as the Fitchburg Line (though with no stops in Cambridge Highlands). The Watertown Branch Railroad began construction in 1847, diverging from the Fitchburg main line east of present-day New Street. It skirts Fresh Pond to the east, and provided passenger service to Waltham until 1938. Freight service continued until 2007 or 2009; the railroad was officially abandoned in 2011 and is being turned into a rail trail in segments. The curve of the Watertown Branch defines the rear boundary of the Fresh Pond Mall and the curve of the industrial buildings on New Street.

By 1903, there were still sparse development improvements other than the railroads, Concord Avenue, and a few nearby industrial buildings. The neighborhood was urbanized into a largely industrial area in the 1900s.
