= Somerville station (Fitchburg Railroad) =

Former railway station in Somerville, Massachusetts

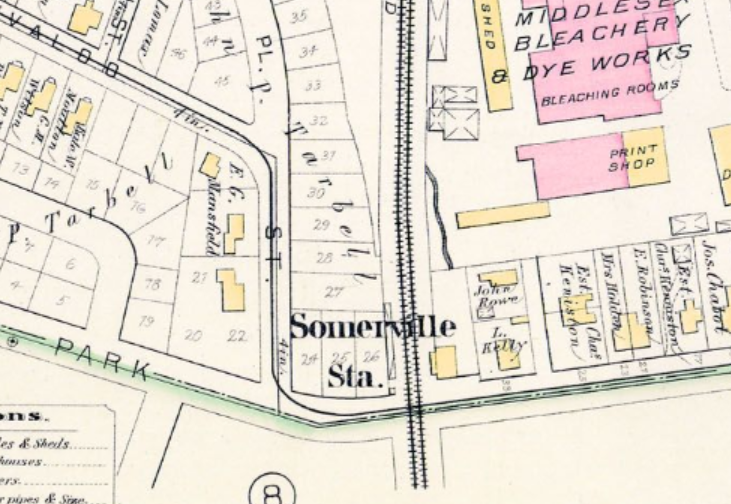
- Somerville station on an 1884 map

General information
- Coordinates: 42°22′54.5″N 71°6′25.7″W
- Line: Fitchburg Railroad

History
- Closed: July 9, 1938

Former services
Preceding station	Boston and Maine Railroad	Following station
Cambridge toward Waltham	Watertown Branch	Union Square toward Boston
Cambridge toward Fitchburg	Boston – Fitchburg	Union Square toward Boston
Harvard Square Terminus	Harvard Branch 1849–1857	Terminus
Location

Somerville station was a train station on the Fitchburg Railroad in Somerville, Massachusetts.

== History ==
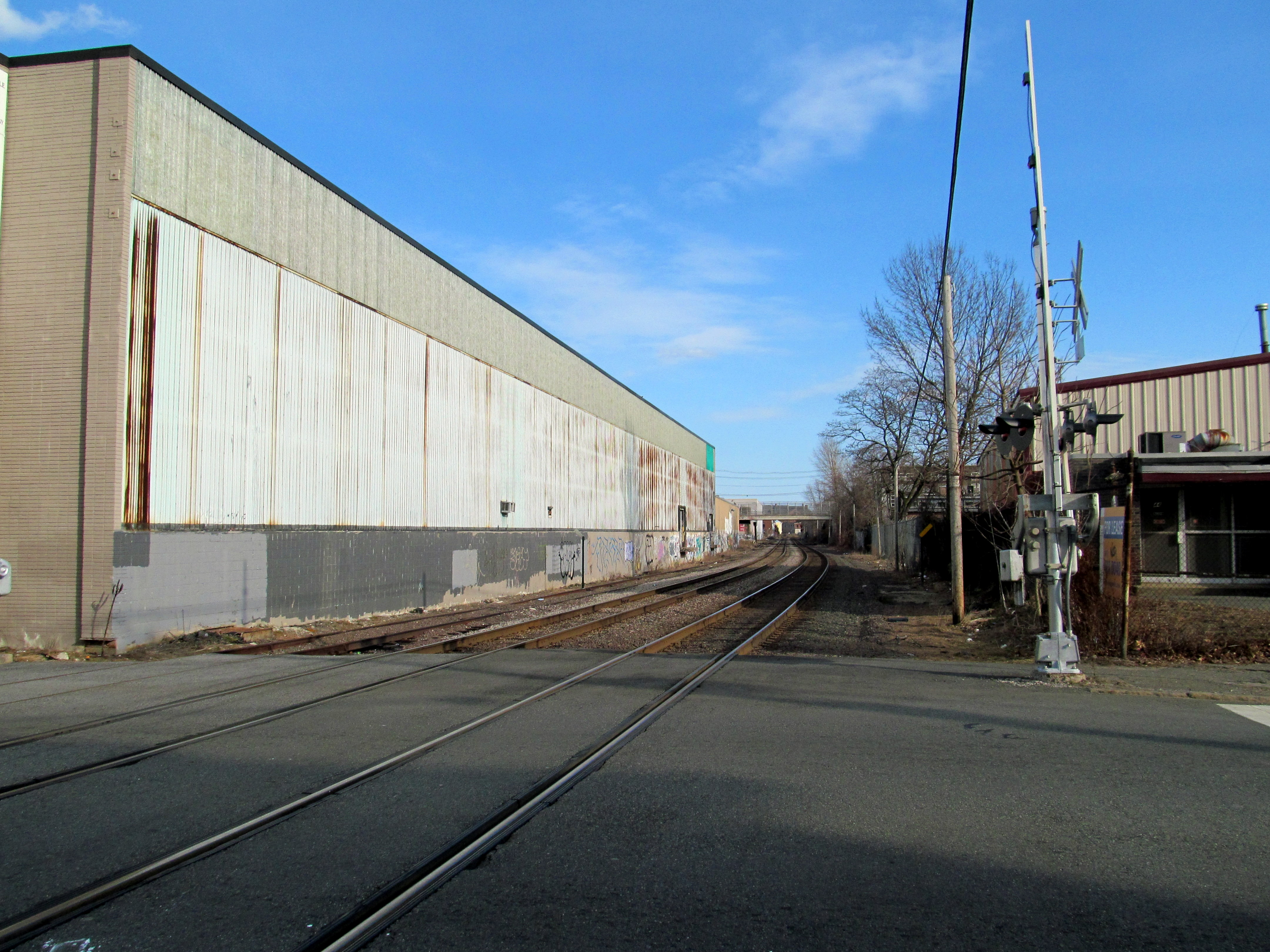
The Park Street grade crossing in 2012

A short-lived station opened at Kent Street in 1842. By 1851, Somerville station was located 0.2 miles (0.32 km) to the east at Park Street, near the junction of the Harvard Branch Railroad. The station building was located on the north side of the tracks, just west of Park Street. Like Union Square and other local stops, Somerville was served primarily by Lexington Branch trains in the mid-19th century.

Planning to eliminate the eleven remaining grade crossings in Somerville, five of which were on the Fitchburg Route mainline, began in 1900. In 1906, the city engineer proposed to raise 1.8 miles (2.9 km) of the line between Beacon Street and Somerville Avenue to eliminate the five level crossings, but that scheme was not adopted. The other four crossings were eliminated in 1908–1912, but the Park Street grade crossing remained. In 1935, the city requested that the crossing be replaced with a bridge as part of a Works Progress Administration-funded grade crossing elimination program. It was not, and the location has continued to see collisions.

Horsecar and later electric streetcar service cut ridership at urban stations; by 1917, Union Square and Somerville stations were served by 4–5 daily Watertown Branch trains plus several off-peak mainline local trains. As passenger volumes dwindled, the station building was rented to an upholstery maker by 1924. By 1929, their only service was two inbound and one outbound Watertown Branch train. Service to the two stations ended on July 9, 1938, along with the end of passenger service on the Watertown Branch.
