= Union Square station (Somerville) =

Light rail station in Somerville, Massachusetts, US

Union Square
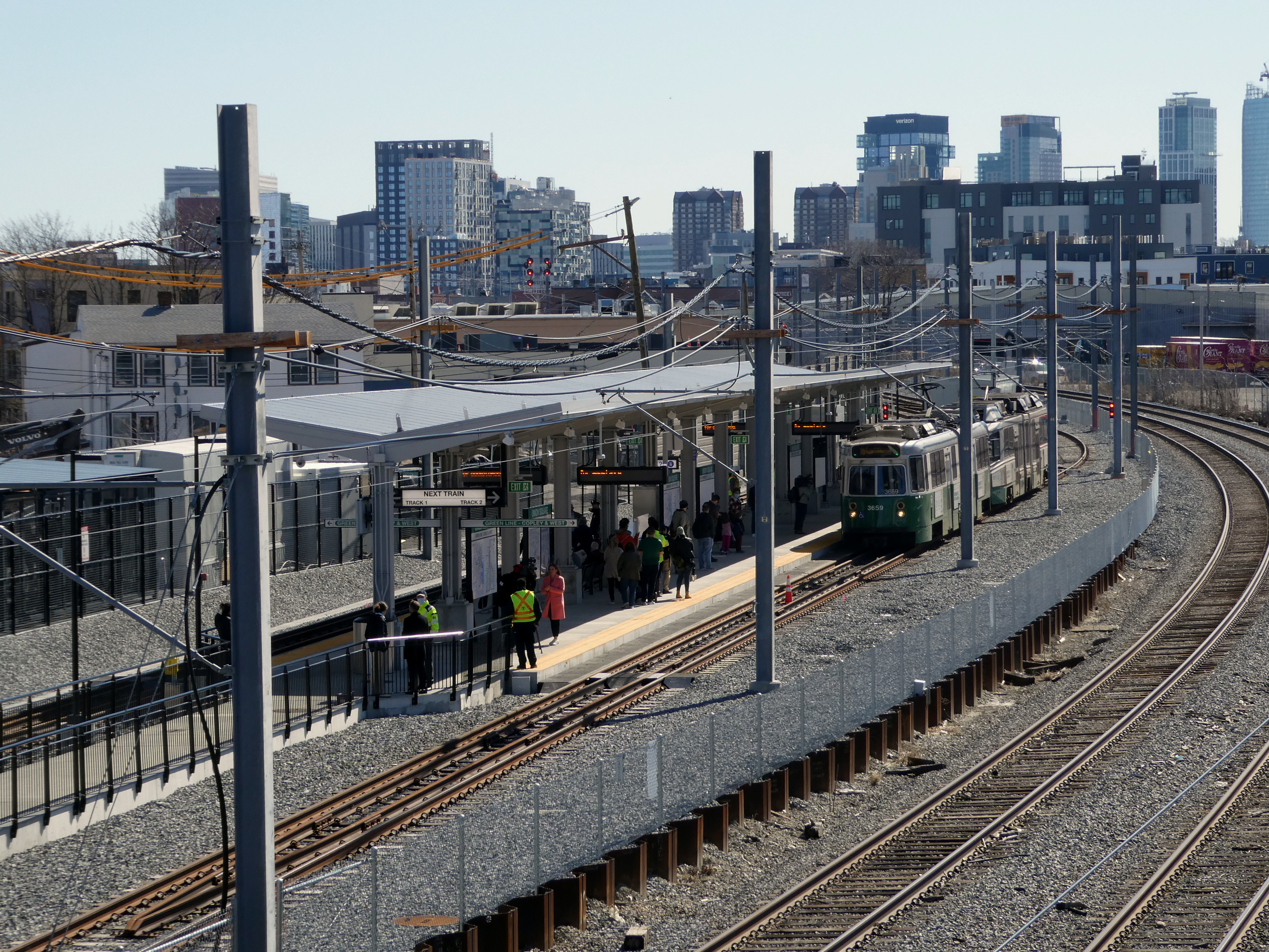
- A train arriving at Union Square station in March 2022

General information
- Location: Prospect Street south of Union Square; Somerville, Massachusetts
- Coordinates: 42°22′37.72″N 71°5′39.45″W
- Line: Union Square Branch
- Platforms: 1 island platform (Green Line)
- Tracks: 2 (Green Line); 2 (Fitchburg Line)
- Connections: MBTA bus: 85, 87, 91, 109

Construction
- Cycle facilities: 120 spaces
- Accessible: Yes

History
- Opened: March 21, 2022

Passengers
- 3,645 boardings (projected)

Services
Preceding station	MBTA	Following station
Terminus	Green Line D branch	Lechmere toward Riverside
Former services
Preceding station	MBTA	Following station
Terminus	Green Line E branch 2022	Lechmere toward Heath Street
Preceding station	Boston and Maine Railroad	Following station
Somerville toward Waltham	Watertown Branch	Boston Terminus
Somerville toward Fitchburg	Boston – Fitchburg	Boston Terminus
Location

Union Square station is a light rail station on the Massachusetts Bay Transportation Authority (MBTA) Green Line located in the Union Square neighborhood of southeastern Somerville, Massachusetts. The accessible terminal station has a single island platform serving the two tracks of the Union Square Branch, which parallels the Fitchburg Line. It opened on March 21, 2022, as part of the Green Line Extension (GLX), which added two northern branches to the Green Line.

The Fitchburg Railroad opened a station at Prospect Street in the 1840s; it was renamed to Union Square around 1875. The station was closed in 1938 and demolished around that time. Extensions to the Green Line were proposed throughout the 20th century, but a Union Square spur was not considered until the early 21st century. Several station sites and alignments were considered, with the Prospect Street location and the route along the Fitchburg Line chosen in 2009. The MBTA agreed in 2012 to open the station by 2017, and a construction contract was awarded in 2013.

Cost increases triggered a wholesale reevaluation of the GLX project in 2015. A scaled-down station design was released in 2016, with a design and construction contract issued in 2017. Construction of Union Square station began in early 2020 and was largely completed by late 2021. The station was initially served by the Green Line E branch, but is now served by the Green Line D branch. A major development project is under construction near the station.

== Station design ==
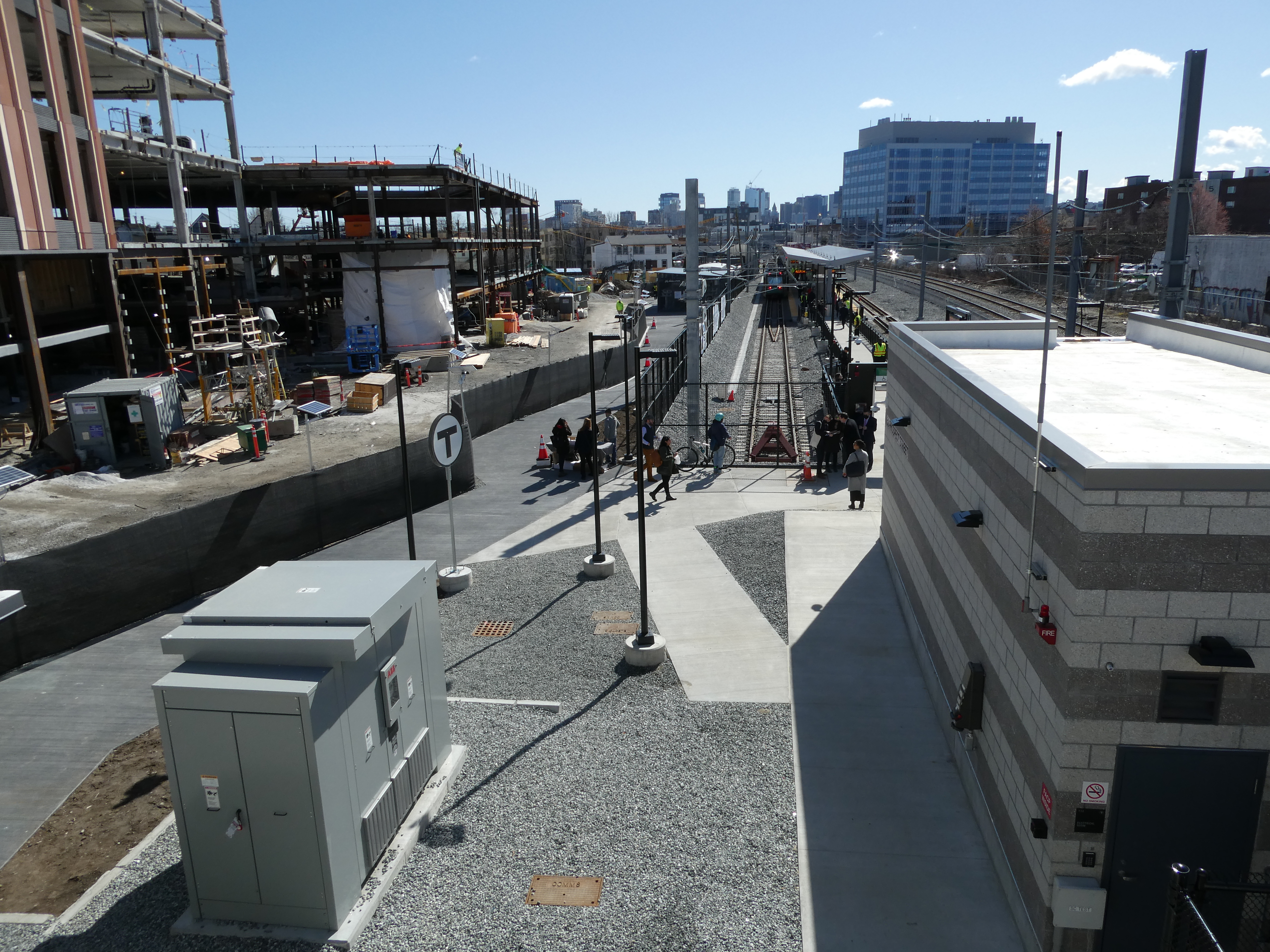
The station in March 2022 with the utility building at right

Union Square station is located on the east side of the Prospect Street bridge, about 900 feet (270 m) south of the Union Square intersection. The Fitchburg Line runs roughly northwest–southeast through the station area, with the two-track Union Square Branch of the Green Line on the north side of the Fitchburg Line tracks. The station has a single island platform, 225 feet (69 m) long and 20 feet (6.1 m) wide, located about 250 feet (76 m) east of Prospect Street between the Green Line tracks. A canopy covers the full length of the platform.

The platform is 8 inches (200 mm) high for accessible boarding on current light rail vehicles (LRVs), and can be raised to 14 inches (360 mm) for future level boarding with Type 9 and Type 10 LRVs. It is also provisioned for future extension to 300-foot (91 m) length. A starter booth is located at the east end of the platform, with an at-grade emergency exit walkway leading to Allen Street.

The station entrance plaza is located on the east side of the Prospect Street bridge, next to a small utility building. A walkway connects the plaza and platform, with fare vending machines located in a wider section of the walkway at its west end. Tail tracks are located on each side of the walkway. The tail tracks are designed not to preclude further extension to Porter station in the future. To the north of the entrance plaza is "Station Plaza", built by the developer of an adjacent building. The main entrance to the station is a walkway from Prospect Street to the north. An elevator and stairs connect to the Prospect Street bridge.

Public artwork at the station includes Passage by Matthew Trimble – a sculptural archway over the walkway to the platform – as well as murals on station sign panels. Bike racks with space for 34 bikes are located in the entrance plaza. A covered shelter has racks for 86 bikes. Four MBTA bus routes – 85, 87, 91, and 109 – stop in Union Square near the station.

== History ==
=== Railroad station ===
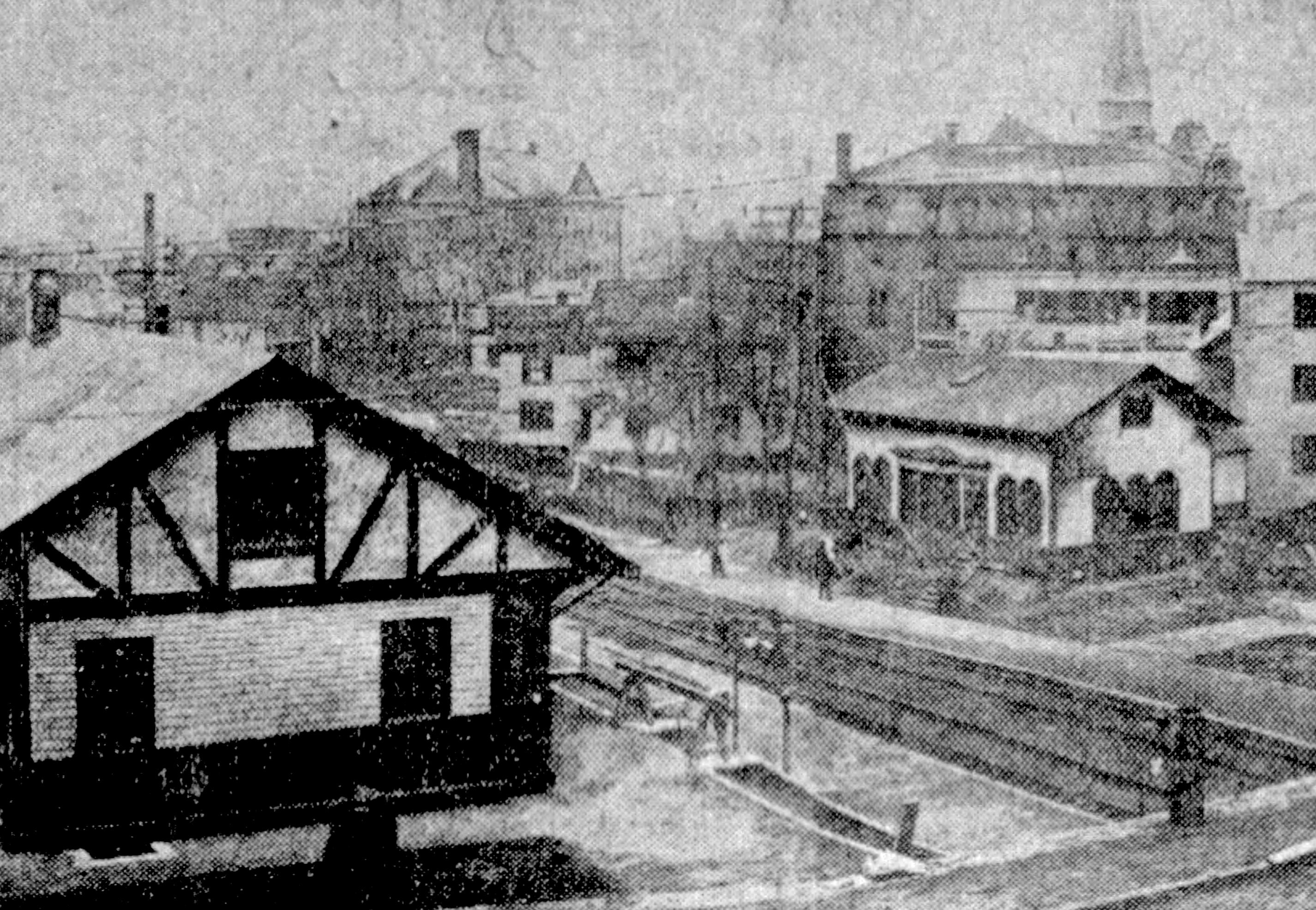
New (left) and old stations in December 1911

The Charlestown Branch Railroad was extended through Somerville in 1841, opening on January 5, 1842. It was absorbed into the Fitchburg Railroad in 1846. Prospect Street station – which was located off Medford Street (now Webster Avenue), slightly west of Prospect Street – was opened within several years to serve the Sand Pit Square area. Like Somerville station and other local stops, Prospect Street was primarily served by Lexington Branch trains in the mid-19th century. The nearby square became Union Square in the 1860s, but the station was not renamed Union Square until around 1875.

Prospect Street was placed on a bridge over the railroad by 1849, but Webster Street crossed the railroad at grade. Planning to eliminate the eleven remaining grade crossings in Somerville, five of which were on the Fitchburg Route mainline, began in 1900. In 1906, the city engineer proposed to raise 1.8 miles (2.9 km) of the line between Beacon Street and Somerville Avenue to eliminate the five level crossings, but that scheme was not adopted.

After the Somerville Avenue grade crossing was eliminated in 1908–09, work began in April 1911 to raise Webster Street above the tracks. Webster Street and several adjacent buildings were raised about 20 feet (6.1 m), while the tracks were slightly lowered. A special bridge on the east side of the road bridge was built for a 4-foot (1.2 m)-diameter water main that weighed 700 pounds per foot (1,000 kg/m). As part of the project, the 67-year-old station building was replaced by a larger building on the south side of the tracks. Work was completed in December 1911.

Horsecar and later electric streetcar service cut ridership at urban stations; by 1917, Union Square and Somerville stations were served by four to five daily Watertown Branch trains plus several off-peak mainline local trains. As passengers volumes dwindled, the station building was reused for manufacturing by 1924. By 1929, the only service to Union Square and Somerville was one outbound and two inbound Watertown Branch trains. Service to the two stations ended on July 9, 1938, along with the end of passenger service on the Watertown Branch. The station building was demolished sometime between 1936 and 1940.

Adding an MBTA Commuter Rail Fitchburg Line station at Union Square has been considered; by 2003, a stop was expected to open within five years. The 2004 state Program for Mass Transportation estimated such a station would attract 390 daily riders. A Union Square commuter rail station – either in addition to a Green Line station or in lieu of it – was listed as a possibility in 2012 as an interim air quality mitigation measure in response to delays in building the Green Line Extension. However, such a station would have been costly to build and could not have been completed by the 2015 deadline, and was therefore not supported by MassDOT.

=== Green Line Extension planning ===
==== Alignment ====
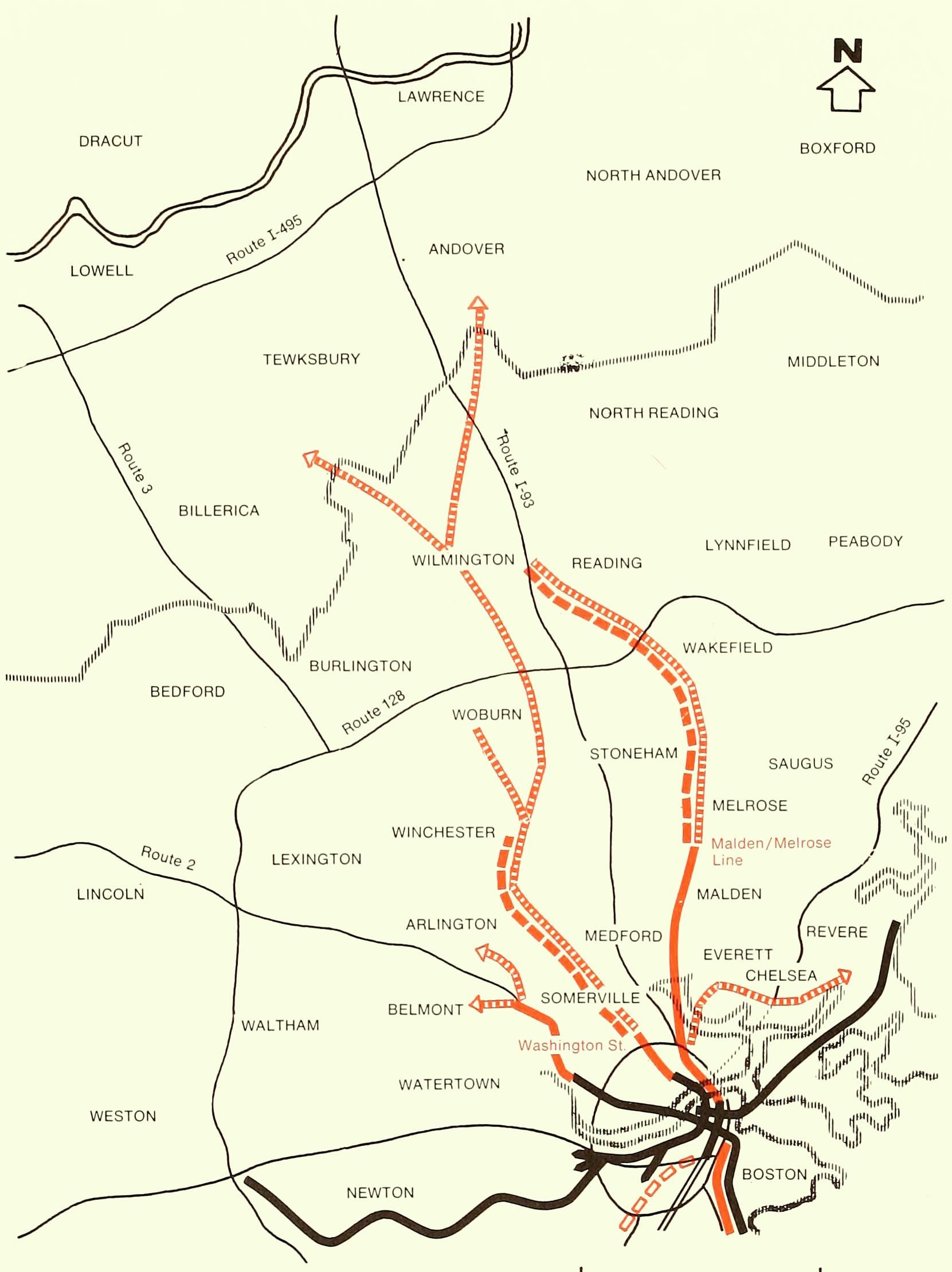
Map of a 1966 extension proposal – typical of 20th-century plans – that did not include service directly to Union Square

Rapid transit extension northwest from Lechmere was first proposed in 1922. Various 20th-century proposals called for rapid transit along the B&M Southern Division (now the Lowell Line) to West Medford or beyond; the nearest station to Union Square was to be about 0.4 miles (0.6 km) to the east. A 1980s corridor plan considered a direct extension to Union Square as a possible alternative.

In 1991, the state agreed to build a set of transit projects as part of an agreement with the Conservation Law Foundation (CLF), which had threatened a lawsuit over auto emissions from the Central Artery/Tunnel Project (Big Dig). Among these projects was a "Green Line Extension To Ball Square/Tufts University", to be complete by the end of 2011. The 2003 Program for Mass Transportation considered both Green Line and Blue Line extensions to West Medford, including alignments that would deviate from the Lowell Line right-of-way to directly serve Union Square.

An updated agreement, announced in May 2005, added a Union Square branch to the Green Line Extension. The Beyond Lechmere Northwest Corridor Study, a Major Investment Study/alternatives analysis, was published in 2005. The analysis studied a variety of light rail and bus rapid transit extensions, including a branch to Union Square. The Massachusetts Executive Office of Transportation and Public Works submitted an Expanded Environmental Notification Form (EENF) to the Massachusetts Executive Office of Environmental Affairs in October 2006. The EENF identified a Green Line extension with Medford and Union Square branches as the preferred alternative; the Union Square Branch was to follow the Fitchburg Line right-of-way. That December, the Secretary of Environmental Affairs issued a certificate that required analysis of a Somerville Avenue alignment for the Union Square Branch in the draft environmental impact report (DEIR) for the Green Line Extension (GLX).

By early 2008, three alignments were under consideration: a surface route along the Fitchburg Line, with a station east of Prospect Street; a surface route on Somerville Avenue, with a station west of Prospect Street; and a single-track loop combining both routes, with an underground station under Prospect Street south of Somerville Avenue. Union Square was among the planned station sites officially announced in May 2008. Several additional potential tunnel alternatives for an underground station at Union Square, with a short tunnel near Prospect Street or a longer tunnel under Somerville Avenue, were analyzed in 2008 and found not to be cost-effective.

==== Station design and contracts ====
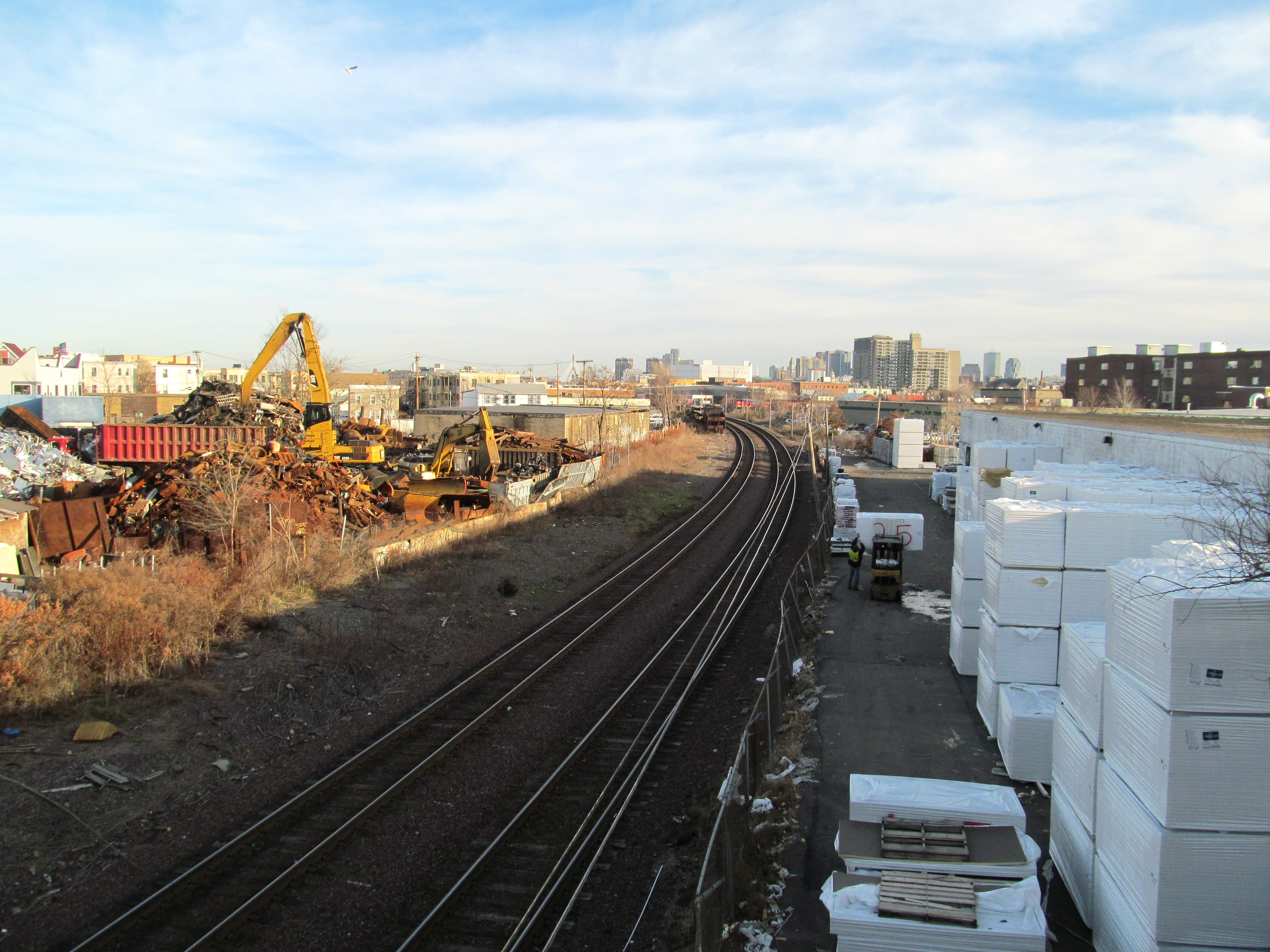
The proposed site (left) in 2011, prior to acquisition and clearing

The DEIR, released in October 2009, selected the Fitchburg Line routing on the basis of lower cost, higher reliability due to grade separation, and less property acquisition required than the other alternatives. Preliminary plans in the DEIR called for a curved station platform with faregates at the west end. A two-story station building would connect to the Prospect Street bridge, with an additional connection directly to platform level from the north.

Updated plans shown in May 2011 moved the platform eastwards and added moved the kiss-and-ride area from the bridge to north of the headhouse. Plans presented in February 2012 enlarged the upper level of the headhouse to have it become the primary entrance. This would have allowed the lower entrance to be closed to accommodate the outbound track, were a proposed further extension to Porter to be built. A further update in June 2013 removed a mechanical penthouse, modified the lobby designs, and added bicycle racks near the upper entrance.

In August 2012, the City of Somerville, MassDOT, and the MBTA reached a memorandum of agreement about the station. Through the Somerville Redevelopment Authority, the City would acquire $8 million worth of land for the station and grant the MBTA a permanent easement, while retaining the rights for transit-oriented development overhead. In return, the MBTA and MassDOT would pay for cleanup costs at the site, begin construction by the spring of 2014, and open the station no later than "late 2016-early 2017".

In October 2012, the Somerville Board of Aldermen approved the Union Square Redevelopment Plan and authorized an $8 million bond, including $6 million to purchase the land and $2 million for cleanup and station planning. The North Prospect block – a mostly industrial area bordered by the railroad tracks, Prospect Street, Somerville Avenue, and the rear of residential properties on Allen Street – was acquired by the city via eminent domain for $4.5 million in June 2013. The properties were to be vacated by August. The city also received a $1 million EPA grant to clean up one of the properties.

In September 2013, MassDOT awarded a $393 million (equivalent to $520 million in 2024), 51-month contract for the construction of Phase 2/2A – Lechmere station, the Union Square Branch, and the first segment of the Medford Branch to Washington Street – with the stations to open in early 2017. Site cleanup began in September 2014. Design of the station was completed in late 2014.

==== Redesign ====
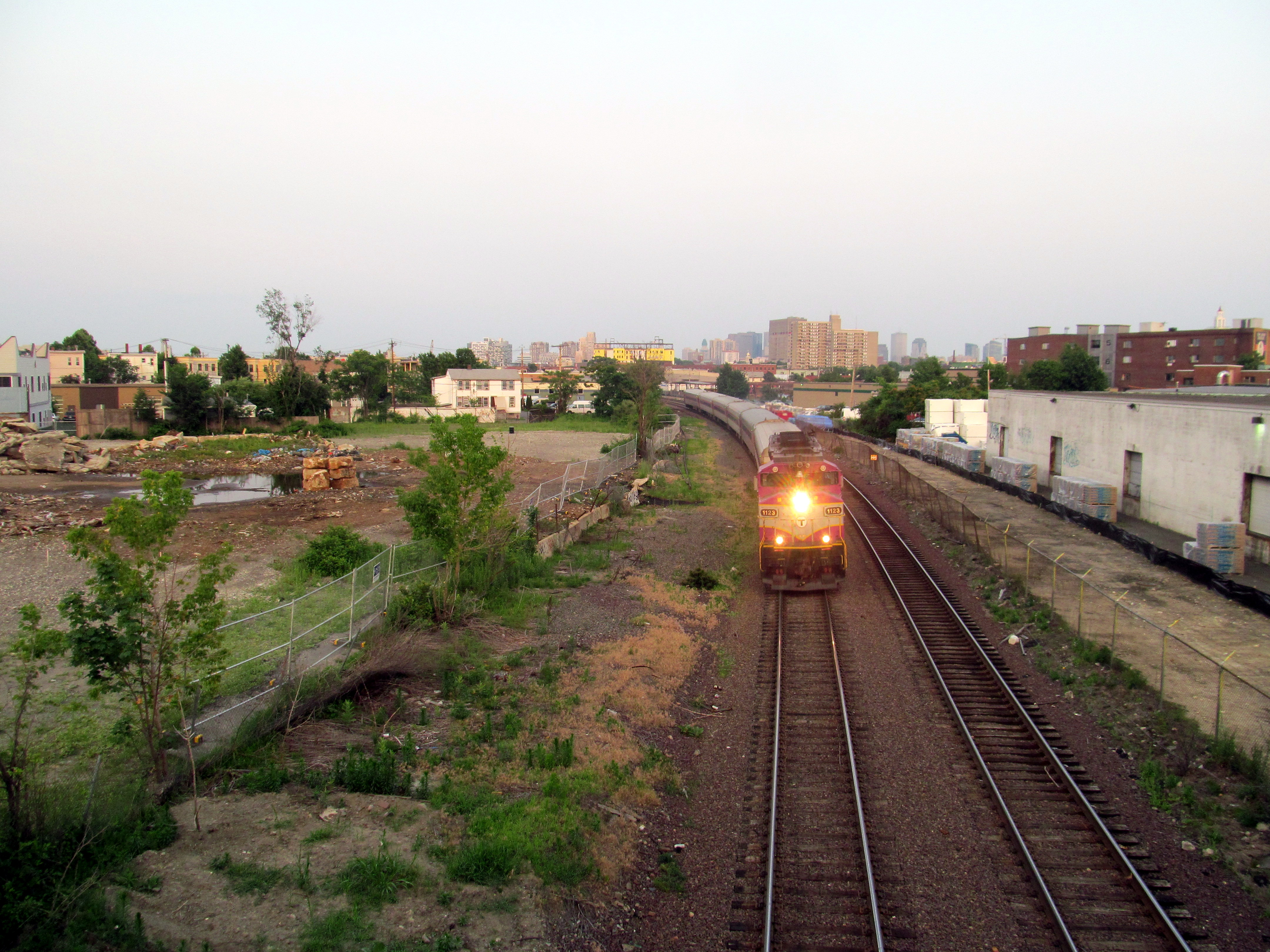
A Fitchburg Line train passing the cleared station site in July 2015

In August 2015, the MBTA disclosed that project costs had increased substantially, with Phase 2A rising from $387 million to $898 million. This triggered a wholesale re-evaluation of the GLX project. In December 2015, the MBTA ended its contracts with four firms. Construction work in progress continued, but no new contracts were awarded. At that time, cancellation of the project was considered possible, as were elimination of the Union Square Branch and other cost reduction measures.

In May 2016, the MassDOT and MBTA boards approved a modified project that had undergone value engineering to reduce its cost. Stations were simplified to resemble D branch surface stations rather than full rapid transit stations, with canopies, faregates, escalators, and some elevators removed. The new design for Union Square removed the direct access from the Prospect Street overpass, with entrance to be only from the plaza on the north side of the station. Several elements of the reduced-cost project design were criticized by community advocates and local politicians. E. Denise Simmons criticized the scaled-down station designs at Union Square and East Somerville for having long ramps rather than elevators, saying they were not sufficient for accessibility. In December 2016, the MBTA announced a new planned opening date of 2021 for the extension.

A design-build contract for the GLX was awarded in November 2017. The winning proposal included six additive options – elements removed during value engineering – including full-length canopies at all stations. Station design advanced from 0% in March 2018 to 24% that December and to 100% in October 2019. The 100% design relocated a utility building between the tracks so as to not preclude future extension.

=== Redevelopment ===
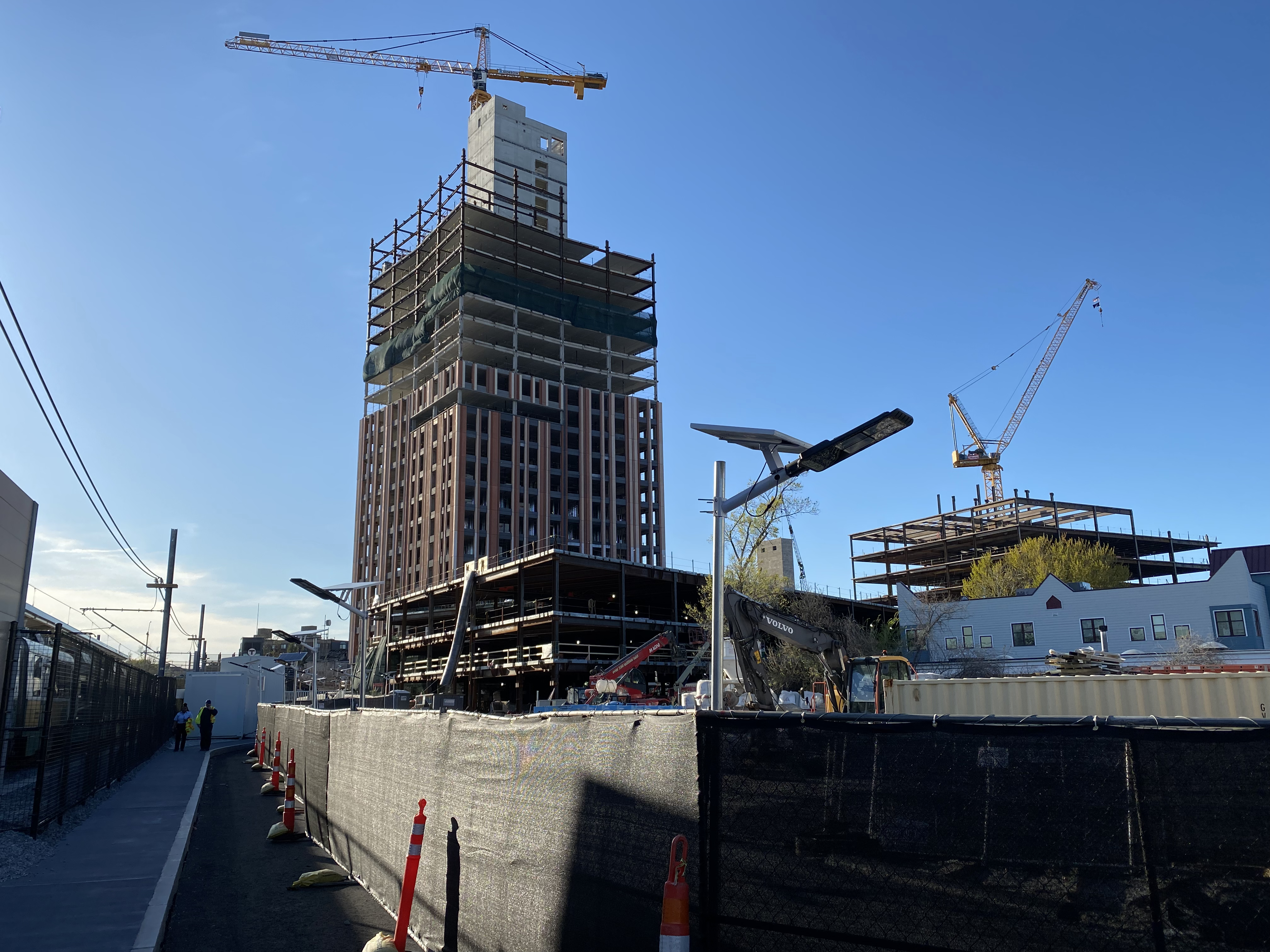
USQ buildings under construction adjacent the station, left, in April 2022

The coming of the station provided an opportunity for the city to redevelop Union Square and surrounding areas. A 2009 rezoning designated commercial corridors and transit-oriented development sites; a 2012 revitalization plan led to the selection of a master developer for the area. As with the GLX as a whole, the Union Square redevelopment has been criticized by local advocates for its potential to cause gentrification and community displacement. A 2014 study found that the areas around Union Square and East Somerville stations were expected to have the highest rent increases – up to 67% in some instances.

The USQ mixed-use development in Union Square, which primarily replaced light industrial buildings, was intended as an anti-gentrification measure by increasing housing supply and subsidizing nearby households and businesses at risk of displacement. Still, by late 2014, both residential and commercial rents were rising more than typical in Union Square. In November 2019, the USQ developer, US2, agreed to fund an elevator connecting the station to the Prospect Street bridge. The first new buildings adjacent to the station broke ground in 2021 and were expected to be completed in 2022–23.

=== Construction and opening ===
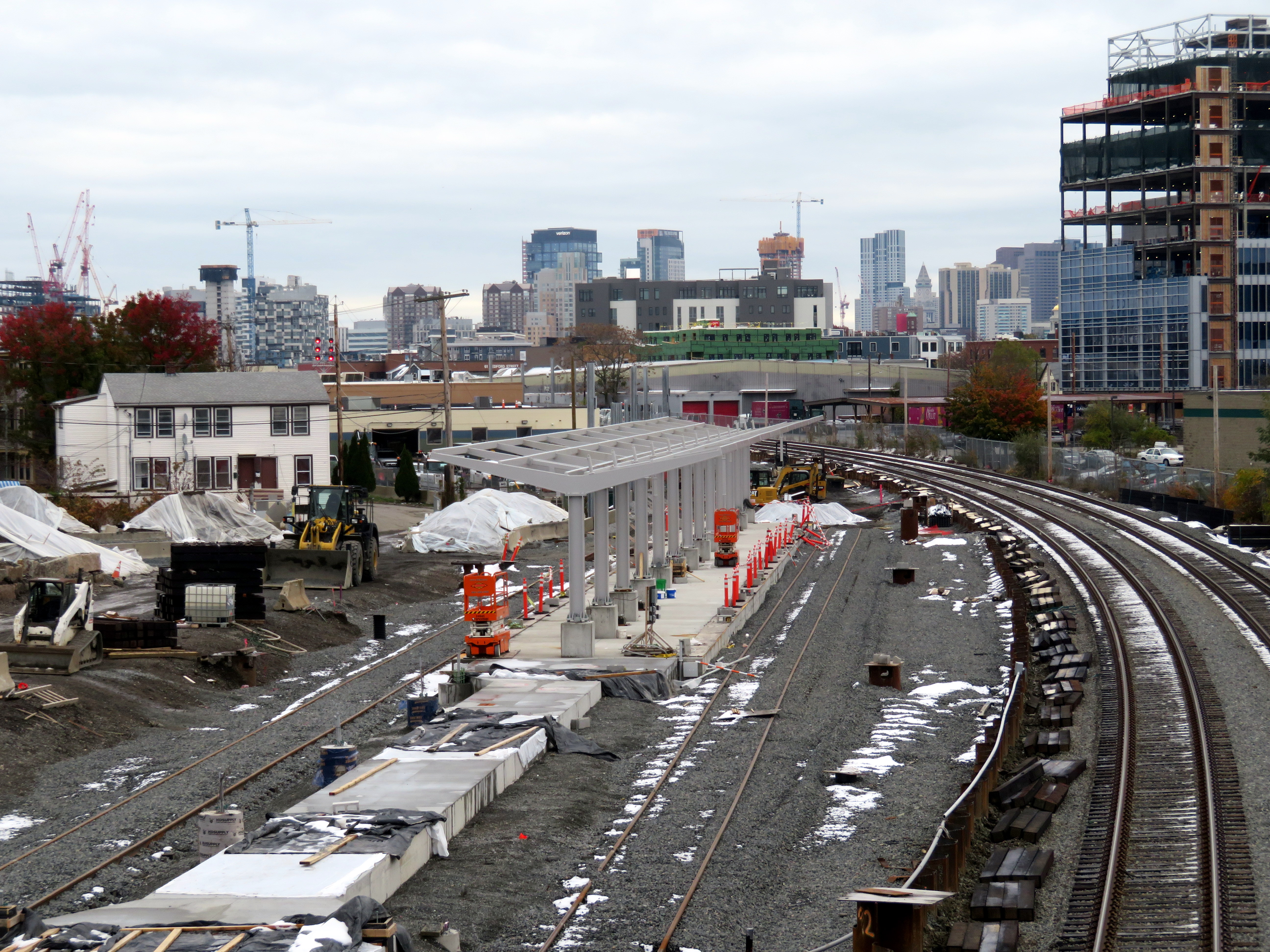
Station construction in November 2020

A groundbreaking ceremony was held on June 25, 2018. With the design complete, work on the station foundation began in January 2020. The station platform was poured by early August 2020, with the canopy constructed that September. Tracks were installed at the station in October 2020. A signal hut at the station was in place by April 2021, with overhead lines added in May. In May 2021, the MBTA indicated that the elevator to the Prospect Street bridge might not be complete by the time the station opened, but that the normal accessible pedestrian route from Prospect Street would be available. Electrical work began in mid-2021; canopy lighting was functional and next-train countdown signs were in place by that November.

Original plans called for the E Branch to be extended to Union Square. In April 2021, the MBTA indicated that Union Square would instead be served by the D Branch. However, the Union Square Branch will be initially served by the E Branch rather than the D Branch from its opening until Medford Branch testing begins. By March 2021, the station was expected to open in October 2021. This was delayed in June 2021 to a December 2021 opening due to supply chain issues, and in October 2021 to a March 2022 opening due to issues with a substation. Train testing on the Union Square Branch began in December 2021. Pre-revenue service, where trains on the branch were operated on a revenue schedule but without passengers aboard, began on January 16, 2022.

The Union Square Branch opened on March 21, 2022. The elevator opened in late April 2022. From August 6 to 21, 2022, Union Square was served by C and D branch trains, as the E branch was closed for maintenance work. The Union Square Branch was closed from August 22 to September 18, 2022; the closure allowed for final integration of the Medford Branch, elimination of a speed restriction on the Lechmere Viaduct, and other work. After that closure, Union Square was served by a mixture of D and E branch trains until November 1, when E branch trains began operating pre-revenue service on the Medford Branch.

The original temporary ramp to Prospect Street was closed on April 20, 2023, for construction of the permanent path. Station Plaza and the permanent path opened on October 23, 2023. The Union Square Branch was closed from September 18 to October 10, 2023, during repairs to Squires Bridge, which carries the McGrath Highway over the tracks. The closure was originally planned for July 18 to August 28, but was delayed and shortened due to public criticism.

A further extension to Porter has been proposed by local officials. In February 2022, the Cambridge City Council signed a resolution requesting work around Union Square station not to interfere with such an extension.
