= Strawberry Hill, Cambridge =

Coordinates: 42°22′40″N 71°9′7″W

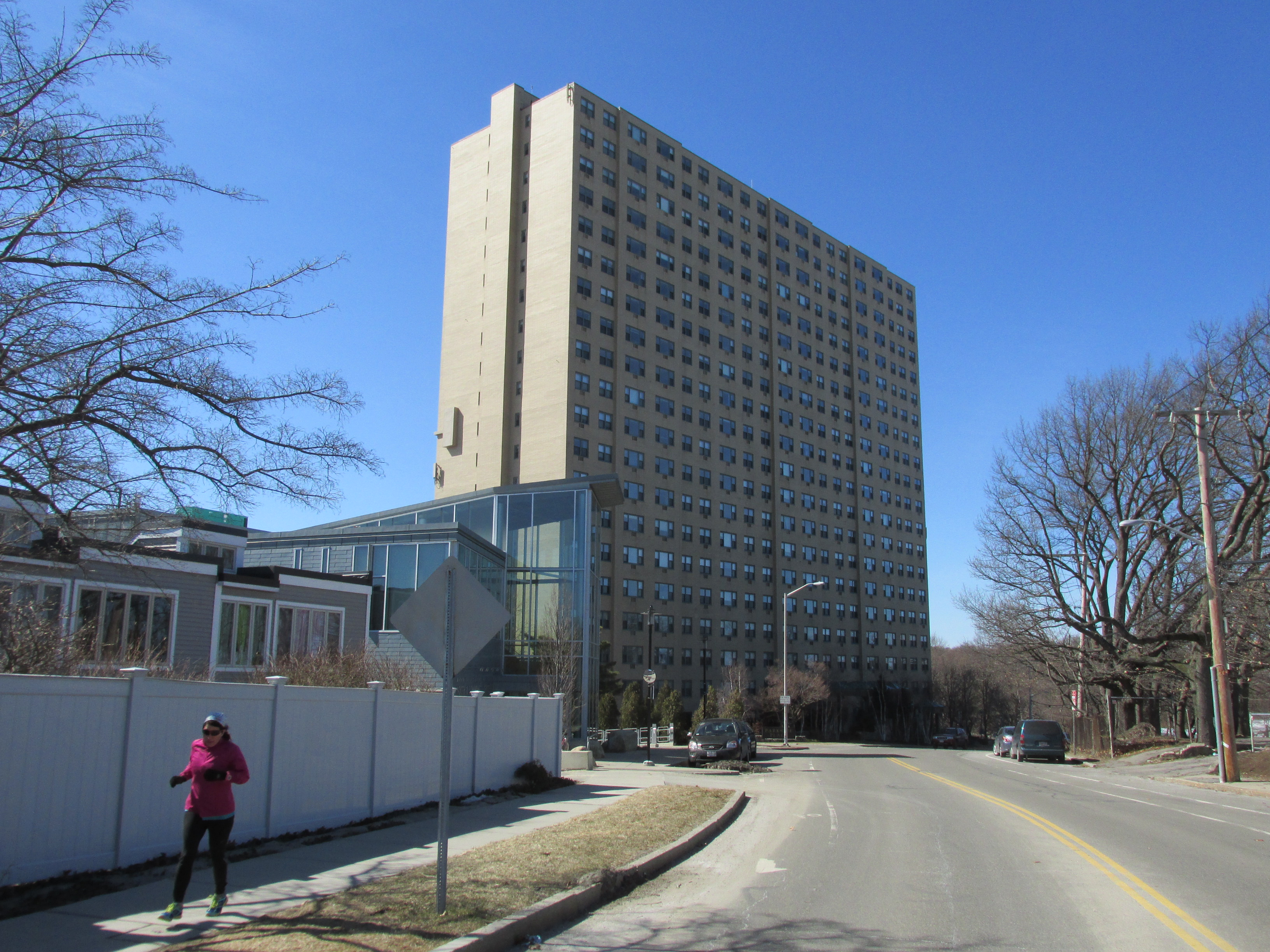
Parkside Place on Huron Avenue

Strawberry Hill, also known as Area 13, is a neighborhood in Cambridge, Massachusetts. It is bounded by the town of Belmont on the west, Watertown on the south, Aberdeen Avenue on the east, and Fresh Pond on the north.
