= Building at 259 Mount Auburn Street =

Historic house in Massachusetts, United States

- U.S. National Register of Historic Places
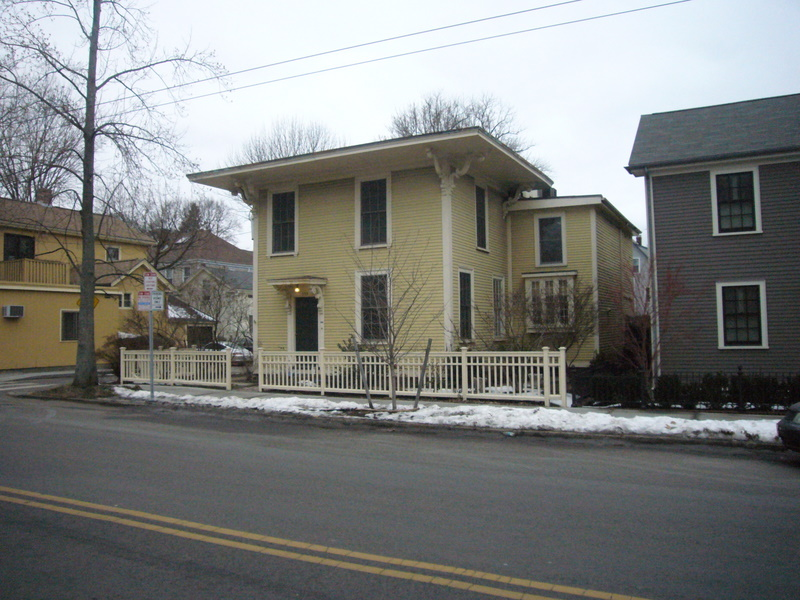

- Location within Massachusetts Location within the United States
- Location: Cambridge, Massachusetts
- Coordinates: 42°22′29.75″N 71°07′55.30″W
- Built: 1850
- Architectural style: Italianate
- MPS: Cambridge MRA
- NRHP reference No.: 83000786
- Added to NRHP: June 30, 1983

259 Mount Auburn Street is a small historic house built in the Italianate style of architecture located in Cambridge, Massachusetts.

== Description and history ==
Details surrounding the construction of the house are unclear, because it was apparently moved to the site where it currently resides in the late 1850s. Its Italianate styling places its construction right around 1850, and its small size (22' by 18') suggests that it might have originally been built as a railroad depot, probably from the Watertown Branch Railroad. It is two stories in height, with a shallow-pitch hip roof that extends to an unusual length beyond the walls, and is supported by large decorative brackets.

The building was listed on the National Register of Historic Places on June 30, 1983.

== See also ==
- National Register of Historic Places listings in Cambridge, Massachusetts
