= Fresh Pond (Cambridge, Massachusetts) =

Pond in Cambridge, Massachusetts

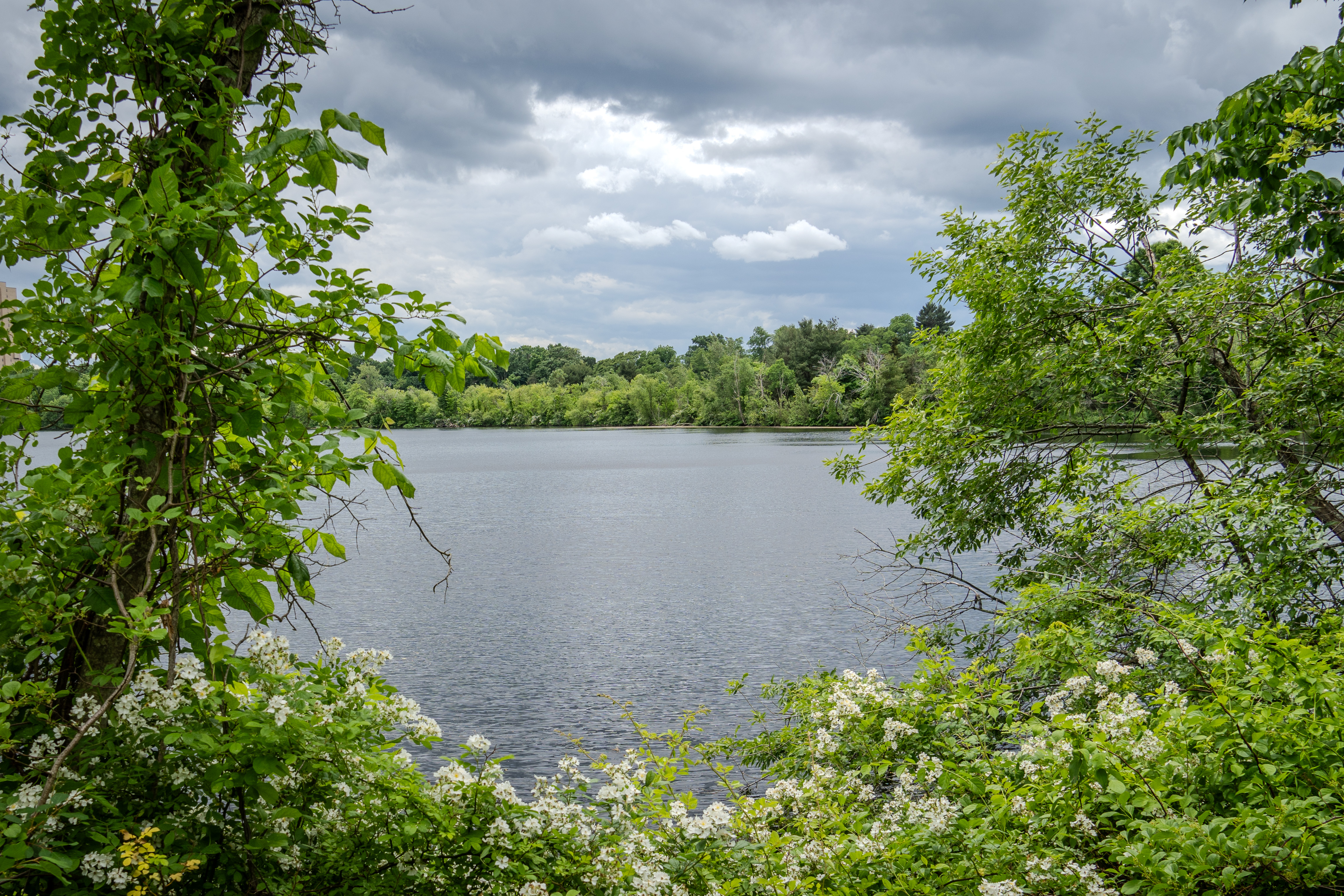
- Fresh Pond in October 2010

- Location within Greater Boston area Location within Massachusetts Location within the United States

- General plan for Fresh Pond Park, by the Olmsted Brothers landscape design firm (1897). "[A]lmost none of the plans to relocate the carriage drive [to the route shown] were ever implemented."
- Location: Cambridge, Massachusetts
- Coordinates: 42°23′N 71°9′W
- Type: reservoir
- Basin countries: United States
- Surface area: 155 acres (63 ha)
- Surface elevation: 3 ft 3 in (1 m)
- Website: Fresh Pond Reservation

Fresh Pond is a reservoir and park in Cambridge, Massachusetts, United States. Prior to the Pond's use exclusively as a reservoir, its ice had been harvested by Boston's "Ice King", Frederic Tudor, and others, for shipment to North American cities and to tropical areas around the world. Fresh Pond is bordered by Fresh Pond Parkway, Huron Avenue, Grove Street, Blanchard Road, and Concord Avenue. The neighborhoods surrounding it are Cambridge Highlands to the north, West Cambridge to the east, and Strawberry Hill to the south. The town of Belmont lies to the west.

Fresh Pond Reservation consists of a 155-acre (627,000 m²) kettle hole lake with an estimated 1.5 billion gallon capacity, an 162 acres (656,000 m²) of surrounding land, with a 2.25 mile (3.6 km) perimeter road popular with walkers, runners and cyclists, and a nine-hole golf course. Part of the Watertown–Cambridge Greenway, a rail trail on the alignment of the former Watertown Branch Railroad, runs along the east side of the pond.

== Early history ==
Native Americans used the pond for fishing and drinking water for several thousand years. Starting in the seventeenth century colonists fished for alewives using fishing weirs in Alewife Brook (which passed through the swamps to the north of Fresh Pond) following the Native Americans' methods. The colonists also used the fields around Fresh Pond for growing hay, and they hunted ducks in the Pond. In the eighteenth century, settlers started farms to the south, west and north of the Pond. In 1796 Jacob Wyeth constructed the Fresh Pond Hotel to the east of the Pond on land that is now part of Kingsley Park. In 1798 a wealthy resident constructed a country estate north of the pond on Black's Nook. In the early 1800s clay was removed from the swamps surrounding Fresh Pond for use in the brick making industry.

== Water and ice ==
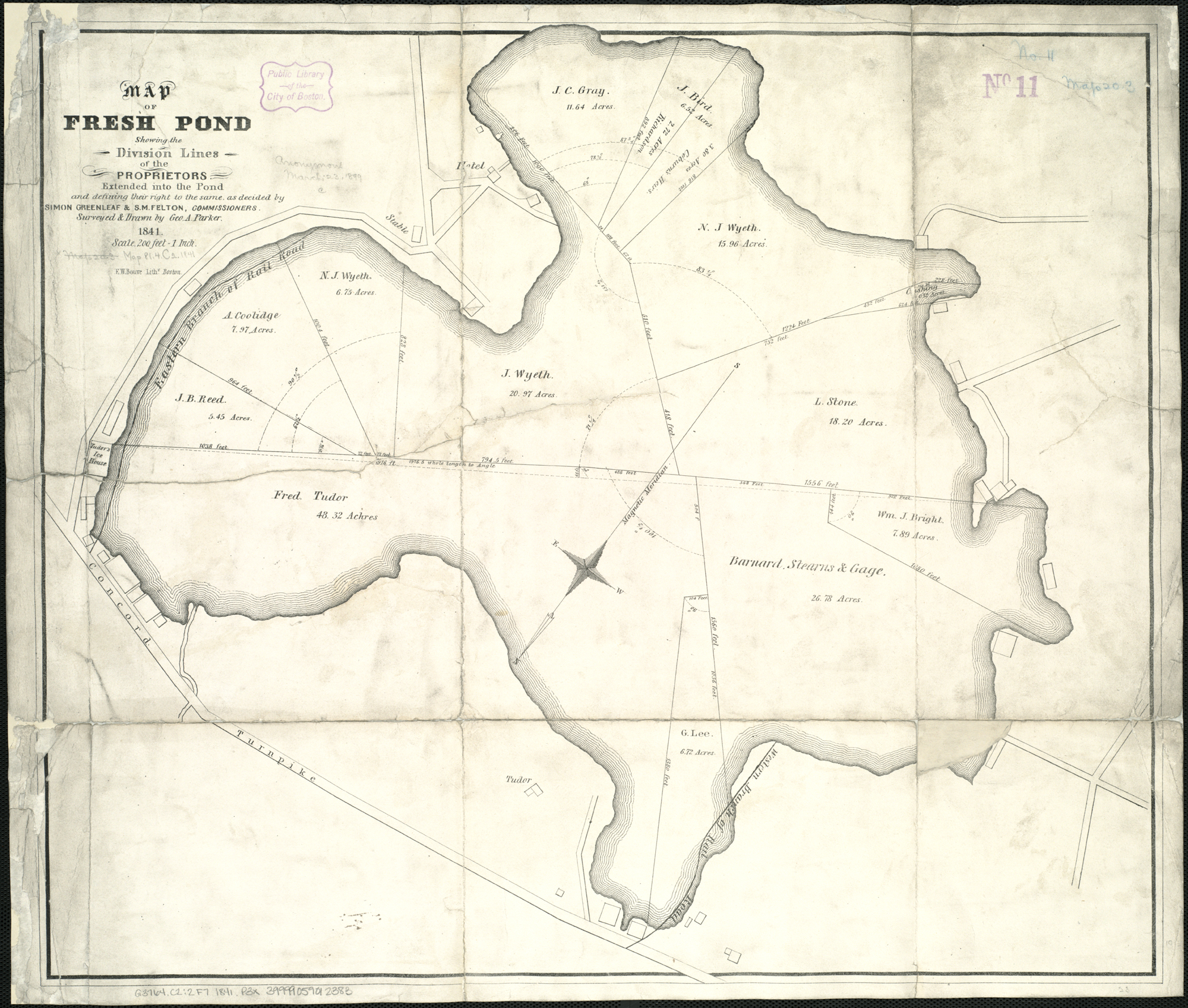
Map of ice harvesting rights on Fresh Pond, 1841

In the mid-19th century, the Pond was privately owned and home to a flourishing ice-harvesting industry, with ice shipped as far as Europe, China, and India. Entrepreneurs began cutting ice from Fresh Pond in the 1820s. The horse-drawn Charlestown Branch Railroad expanded to connect the Fresh Pond icehouses of Frederic Tudor, Addison Gage, and Nathaniel J. Wyeth with several wharves in Charlestown. The first ice shipment was in December 1841. The railroad would later get steam locomotives and become part of the Fitchburg Railroad.

In 1856, a private company began supplying its customers with drinking water from the Pond. In 1865 the business came under city ownership. By the end of the century the Pond and the land surrounding it was entirely city-owned, and an elaborate public water supply system had been developed.

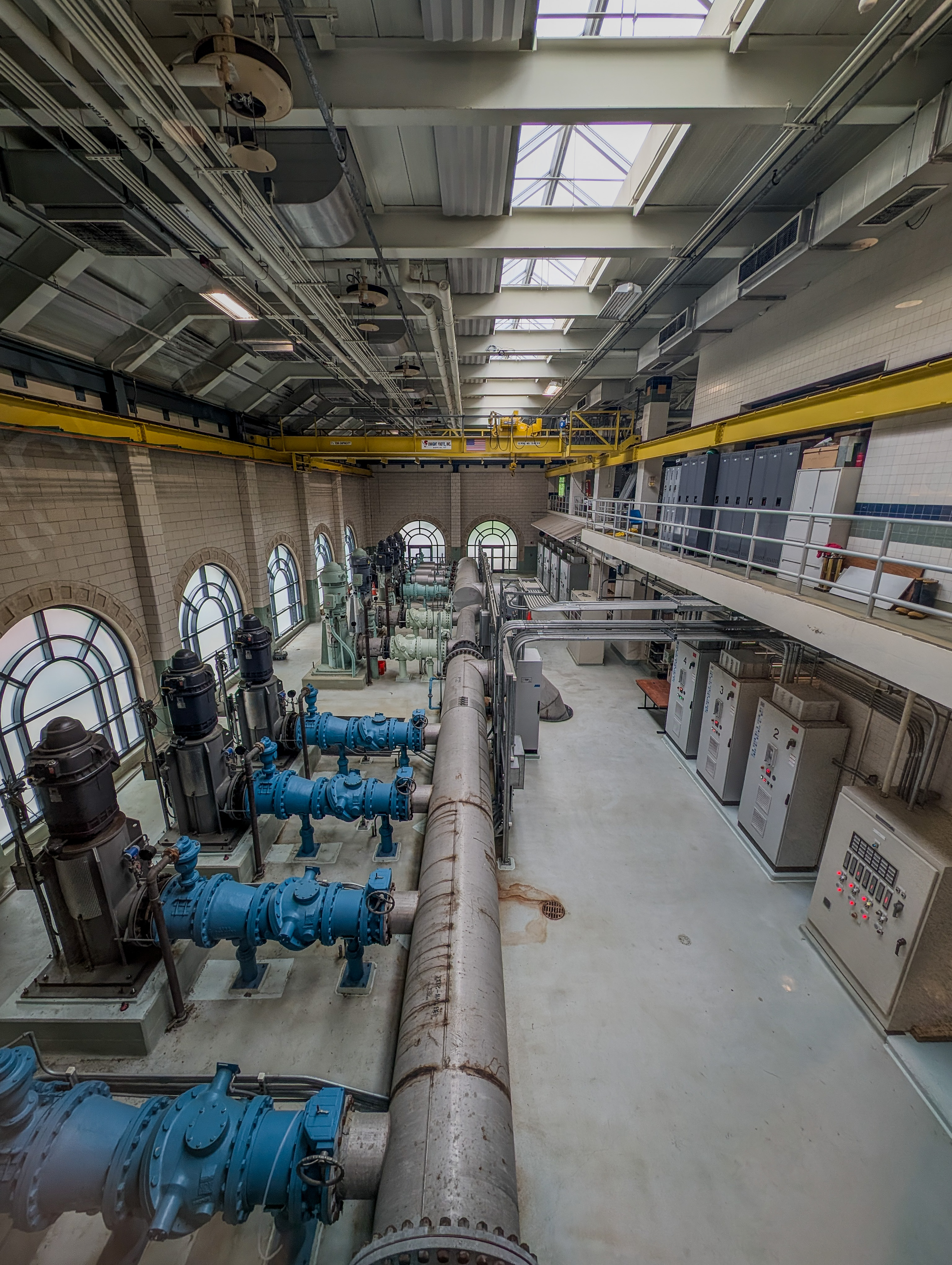
Water treatment pumps, Fresh Pond, 2024

Fresh Pond is part of the overall Cambridge water system. Its water is fed to the pond via an aqueduct from the Hobbs Brook and Stony Brook Reservoirs, located in Lexington, Lincoln, Waltham and Weston, Massachusetts. After purification at the Walter J. Sullivan Water Treatment Facility adjacent to Fresh Pond, the water is pumped upwards roughly 1 kilometer west of Fresh Pond to a higher elevation at the underground Payson Park Reservoir in neighboring Belmont. From there it flows back to Cambridge, with gravity providing the necessary downhill pressure to distribute drinking water to residents and businesses.

== General references ==
- City of Cambridge Water Department
- Fresh Pond history
- Sinclair, Jill (April 2009). Fresh Pond: The History of a Cambridge Landscape. Cambridge, Massachusetts: MIT Press. ISBN 978-0-262-19591-1.
- Weightman, Gavin (2003). The Frozen-Water Trade: A True Story. New York: Hyperion
- Seaburg, Carl and Alan (2003). The Ice King: Frederic Tudor and His Circle. Boston: Massachusetts Historical Society
