= Harvard Branch Railroad =

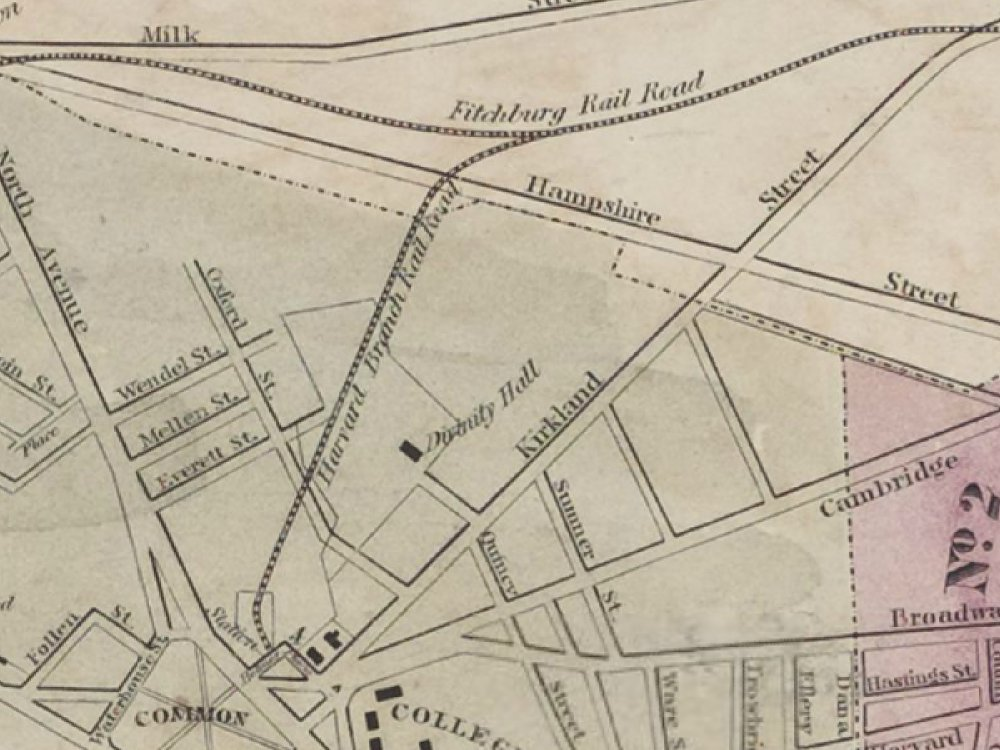
1852 map

The Harvard Branch Railroad was a short-lived branch from the Fitchburg Railroad to Harvard Square and Harvard University in Cambridge, Massachusetts. Part of the former right-of-way is now used by Museum Street.

The company was incorporated April 24, 1849, and soon built a line 0.70 miles (1.13 km) long from just west of Somerville station on the Fitchburg Railroad (at Park Street) southwest to Harvard. On April 19, 1854, it was authorized to abandon the line, and did so in 1855. The Cambridge Railroad started running to Harvard from Boston in 1856 as a street railway, via a different route.
