= Fresh Pond Hotel =

- U.S. National Register of Historic Places
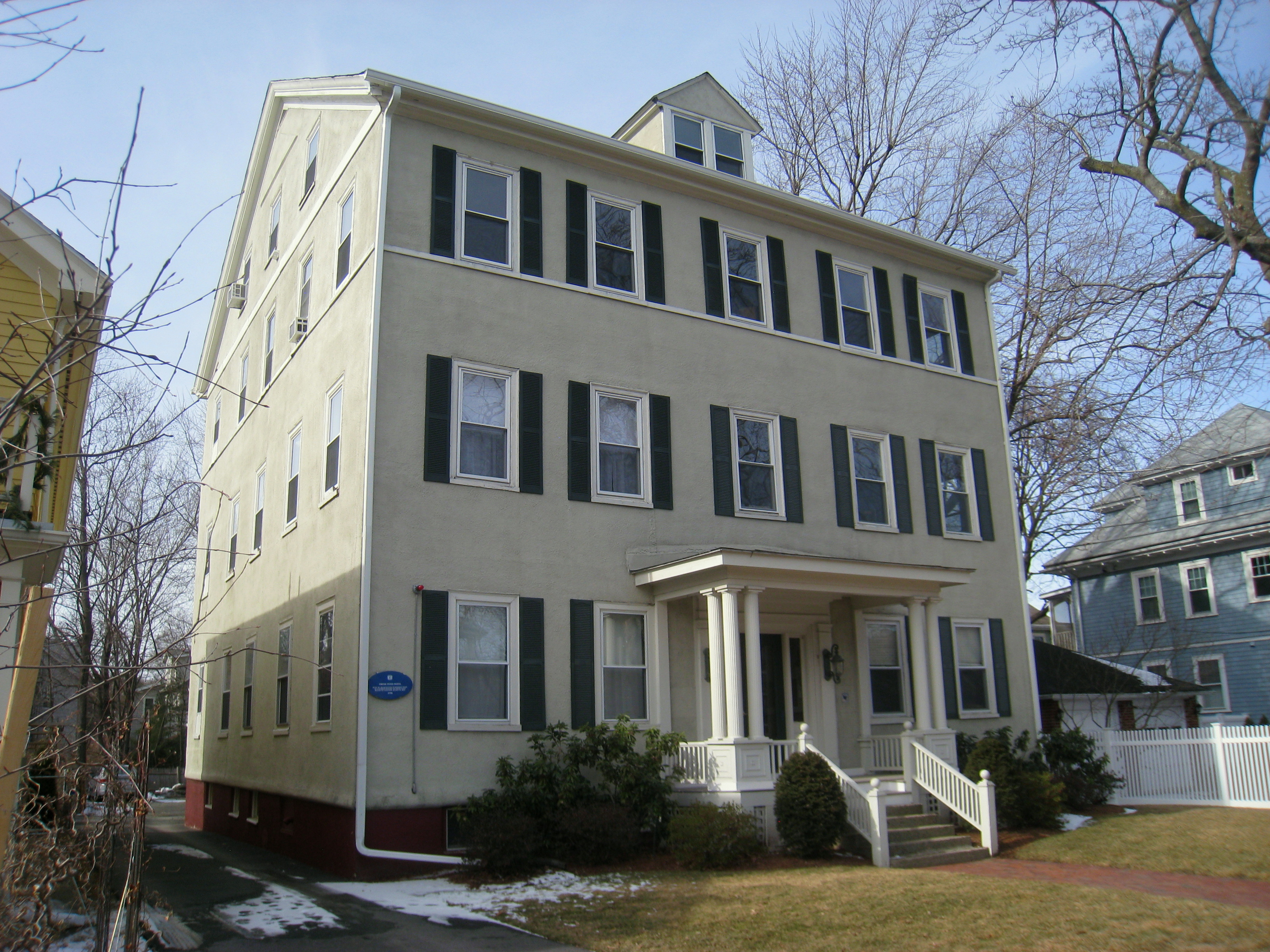

- Location within Massachusetts Location within the United States
- Location: Cambridge, Massachusetts
- Coordinates: 42°22′58.5″N 71°8′27.7″W
- Built: 1796
- Architect: Walton, John; Moore, Joseph
- Architectural style: Greek Revival, Federal
- MPS: Cambridge MRA
- NRHP reference No.: 82001940
- Added to NRHP: April 13, 1982

The Fresh Pond Hotel is an historic former hotel at 234 Lakeview Avenue in Cambridge, Massachusetts, United States.

== History ==
The three-story wood-frame hotel was built in 1796 by Jacob Wyeth. Jacob was a graduate of Harvard, Class of 1792, and on 20 Sept 1796 he bought 8 acres (32,000 m^{2}) from his father, bordering on Fresh Pond, and erected the "Fresh Pond Hotel", which was a popular resort. He managed the hotel until he accumulated a large estate and retired from active business, and leased the hotel to his nephew, Jonas Wyeth, who also retired with a satisfactory fortune, about 1840. Jacob Wyeth resided on the estate until 14 Jan 1857, when he died at nearly 93 years of age.

The building, originally in the Federal style, was updated to the Greek Revival style in 1838, and converted into a convent in 1886. In 1892 the hotel was moved from its original location at Fresh Pond to 234 Lakeview Avenue. The building was listed on the National Register of Historic Places in 1982.

== See also ==
- National Register of Historic Places listings in Cambridge, Massachusetts
