= Watertown Branch Railroad =

Former rail right of way being converted to multi use path

Map

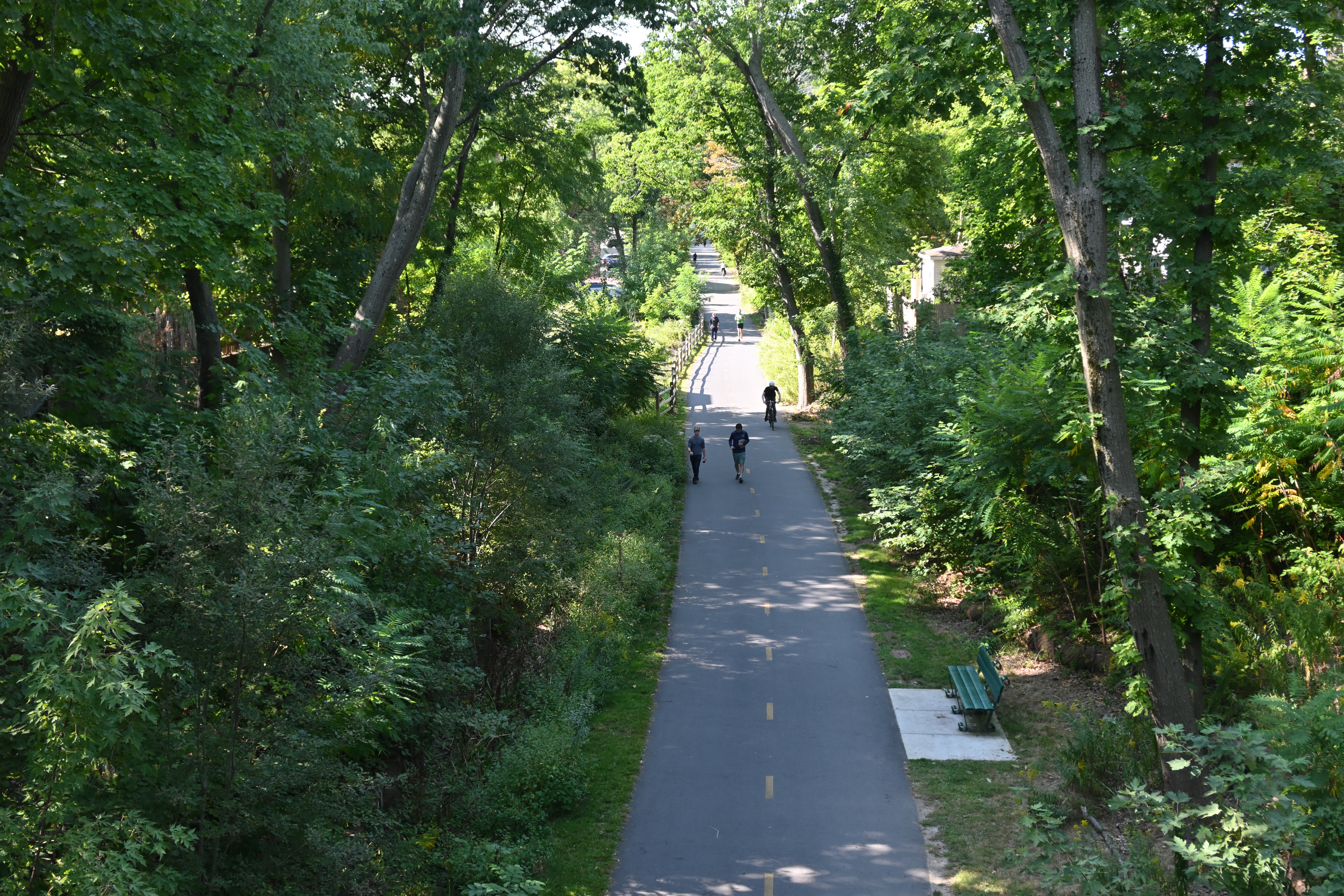
The Watertown-Cambridge Greenway just south of Fresh Pond in 2024

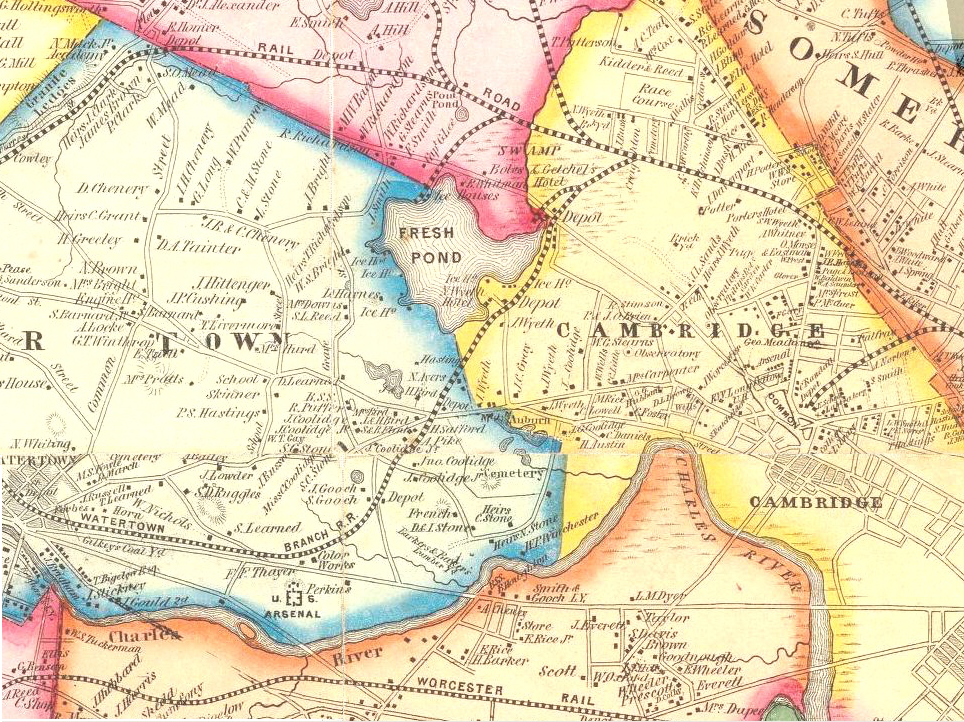
Map of the Watertown Branch Railroad in 1852. The Greenway will follow the route from Fresh Pond to the Arsenal area.

The Watertown Branch Railroad was a branch loop of the Fitchburg Railroad that was meant to serve the town of Watertown and the City of Waltham, Middlesex County, Massachusetts, as an independent short line railroad; it also serviced the Watertown Arsenal. The line has been formally abandoned and portions have been converted into a rail trail, the Watertown-Cambridge Greenway. A section from School Street to Arlington Street in Watertown was completed first. A small portion in Waltham has been converted into a park called Chemistry Station Park after the railroad station once located there. Construction of an extension to Fresh Pond Reservation in Cambridge began in the summer of 2018 and was completed in June 2022.

== History ==
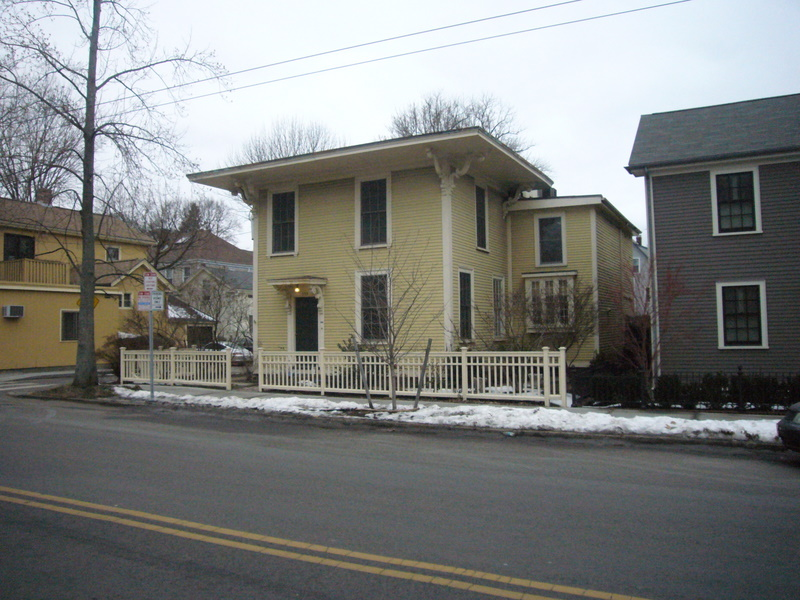
Building at 259 Mount Auburn Street, believed to be an original Watertown Branch station

The railroad was chartered in 1846 and a second company, the Waltham and Watertown Railroad, was chartered to extend the line to the neighborhood just southeast of downtown Waltham, Massachusetts. In order to keep it out of the hands of its rivals, the Fitchburg took control of both companies before any track was laid and merged them into the Watertown Branch.

Construction began from West Cambridge in 1847. By 1849, the line ran to Watertown, with intermediate stops at Mount Auburn and Fresh Pond. In the Fresh Pond area it paralleled the existing Charlestown Branch Railroad which was used to haul ice. By 1851 it reached the Fitchburg's main line at the downtown Waltham station and the branch served as the main passenger line between Boston and Waltham. It was one of the few branch lines to be double tracked, as the line saw quite heavy traffic, especially in the 1880s and 1890s. The Boston and Maine Railroad took over the Fitchburg in 1900.

Competition from streetcars and automobiles cut heavily into inner-suburb passenger traffic. Minor stations were closed, including East Watertown in 1932. (The station was either later reopened, or never closed, as by 1938 it was the most-used station on the branch.) The B&M filed to abandon passenger service - by then a single early-morning round trip - in April 1938. Passenger service on the line ended on July 9, 1938, and the second track was removed by early 1940. The middle section of the line from the Waltham/Watertown line through Watertown Square to East Watertown was abandoned in 1960. This split the branch line in two, but traffic continued on both sides through the remainder of the 20th century. In 1991, about a half mile of track was abandoned on the west side of the line at Bemis, and the remainder of the line back to Waltham was abandoned in 2000.

On October 5, 2011, the Surface Transportation Board agreed to allow Pan Am Railways to abandon the final active 1.72 miles of the Watertown Branch from Newly Weds Foods in Watertown to the branch's junction with the Fitchburg Line between Sherman Street and Alewife in Cambridge. No freight had been carried for at least two years. As of May 2013, all but the approximately half-mile portion between Concord Avenue and the Fitchburg Line was in public hands.

== Watertown-Cambridge Greenway ==
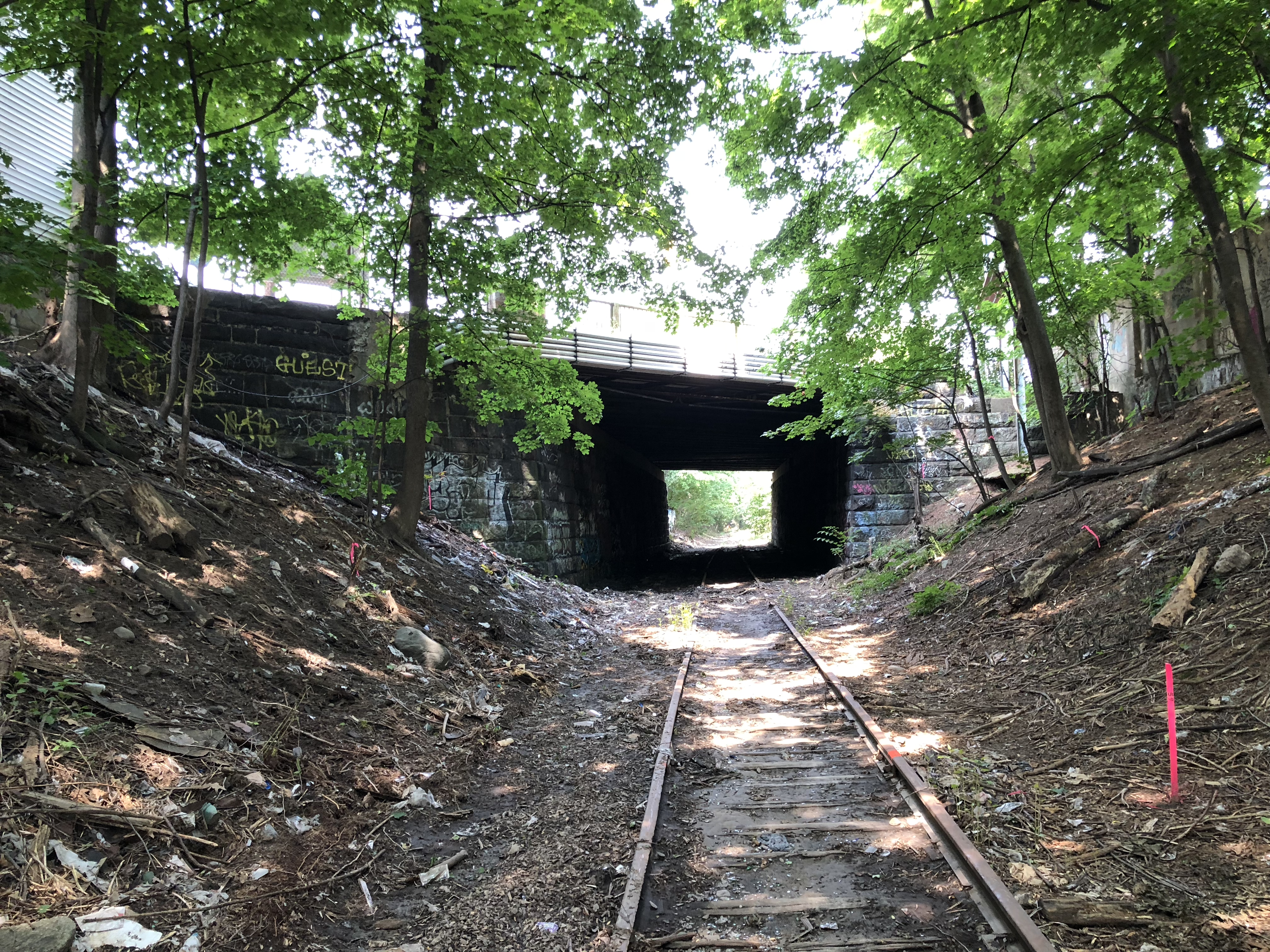
The Watertown-Cambridge Greenway right-of-way cleared of overgrowth in August 2018. Mt. Auburn Street passes overhead.

State and local collaboration has been ongoing for transformation of the rail corridor into a rail trail, once known as the Charles River/Alewife Connector, now called the Watertown-Cambridge Greenway. The condition of the tracks at that time was deemed so poor that trains traveling at a mere 3 miles per hour (4.8 km/h) could derail.

In 1999, the Executive Office of Transportation purchased segments of the right-of-way from Guilford Transportation. This trail segment was later transferred administratively to the MDC, currently known as the Massachusetts Department of Conservation and Recreation (DCR).

On the east side of the branch, service was only to one customer, Newly Weds Foods, until service ended in 2007. The entire branch was then abandoned and out of service. Litter and downed trees were prevalent on the Fresh Pond–Watertown portion of the track before path construction began.

On May 22, 2013, the Massachusetts Department of Conservation and Recreation (DCR) and the City of Cambridge announced their acquisition of major portions of the remaining abandoned right-of-way from the railroad for $1.3 million plus an additional, unspecified amount from Cambridge, allowing completion of the Watertown-Cambridge Greenway. The DCR acquired the portion south of Huron Avenue, while the City of Cambridge now owns the right-of-way north to Concord Avenue.

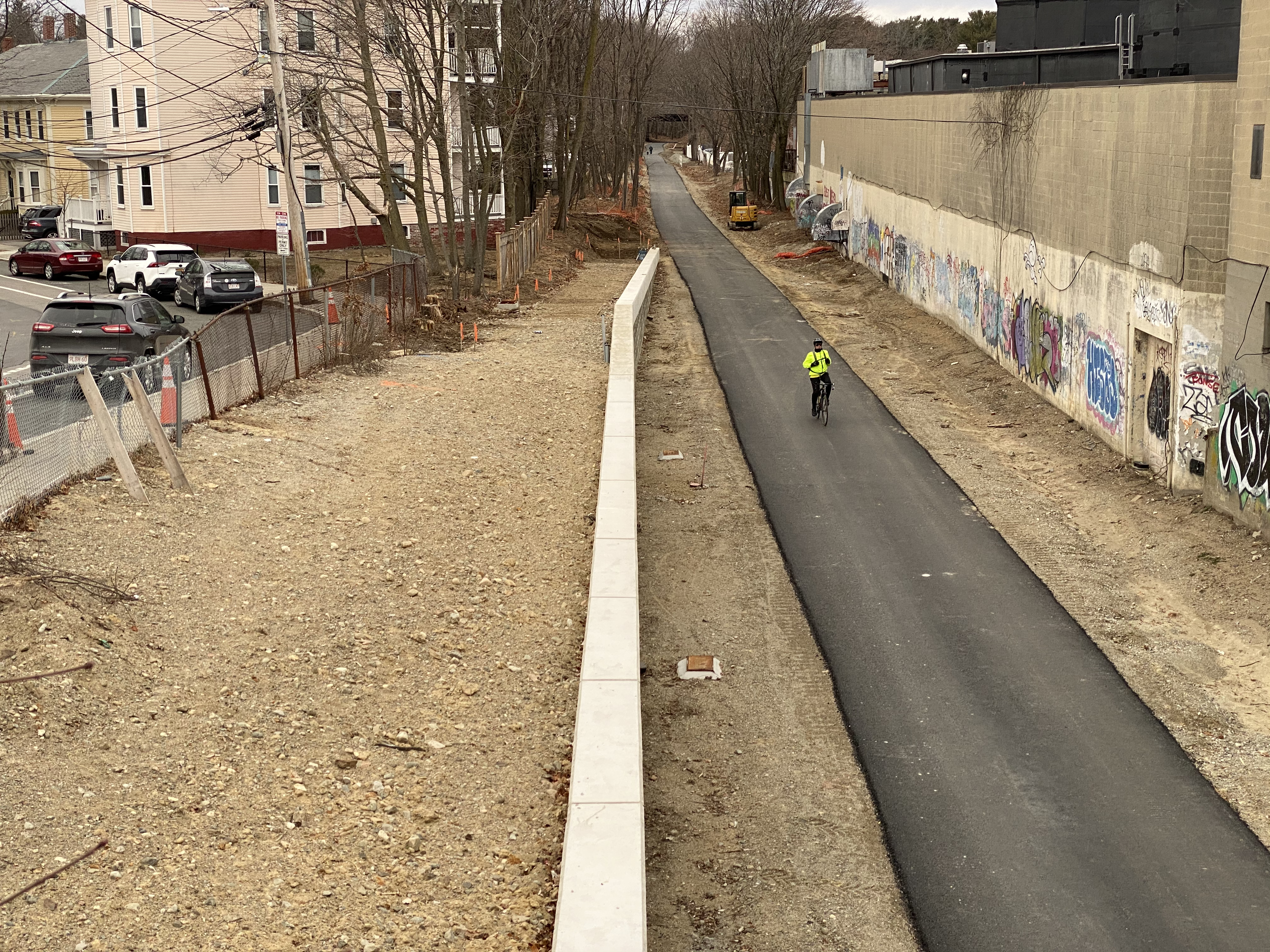
Holworthy Street ramp for the Watertown-Cambridge Greenway under construction, January 2021

In 2015, the DCR obtained $180,000 to fund design of the remaining greenway section, half from private donations. Public meetings were held on June 9 and November 30, the latter to present a 25% design for the greenway. A 75% design presentation was held on June 2, 2016. Funding of $3.6 million was approved by the Boston Region Metropolitan Planning Organization (MPO) in June 2017, with construction projected to start in Fall 2017 or Spring 2018.

The project was advertised for bids in September 2017 and bids were opened in March 2018. As of June, final design was complete. Construction started in late summer. The estimated cost is $3.182 million. As of mid-August 2018, the right-of-way had been cleared of most accumulated overgrowth and surveying work had begun. As of mid-October, track had been largely removed and several dozen trees with diameter greater than 6 inches were being removed due to poor health, safety concerns or construction conflicts. A formal Ground Breaking Event was held on December 5. As of June 2022, the full path is complete and open, with a formal ribbon cutting ceremony in planning.

=== Timeline ===
The path construction process has moved faster in Watertown than in Cambridge.

- 1996: Study to link Charles River & Alewife suggests using the rail right-of-way (ROW) through Watertown
- 1998: Town of Watertown rezones unused RR property as Open Space
- 2000: State purchases ROW from School Street to Grove Street to develop a multi-use path
- 2003: State selects Vanasse Hangen Brustlin (VHB) as path designer
- 2004: State gives VHB notice to proceed with design contract
- 2010: MassDOT begins construction on the School Street to Arlington Street section.
- 2011: The School Street to Arlington Street section opens
- 2013: The City of Cambridge and DCR acquire the remaining corridor from the B&M Railroad
- 2015: Design of remaining greenway segment is funded and reaches 25% level
- 2016: Design of remaining greenway segment reaches 75% level
- 2017: Construction of remaining greenway segment funded Bids advertised.
- 2018: Bids opened and contract awarded to Onyx Corporation. Construction began in August.
- 2020, May. Expected completion postponed to 2021 due to drainage redesign.
- 2022: Mostly complete as of April. Full completed and open in June 2022, official open ceremony date to be announced.

== Geography ==
=== Cambridge ===
The line begins in North Cambridge west of the Sherman Street at-grade crossing. The branch line proceeds west, and then south, where it has at-grade crossings at New Street, Concord Avenue, and the entrance road to the Walter J. Sullivan Water Treatment Facility at the Fresh Pond reservoir. From there, the line proceeds to several underpasses, namely one below a second road into the Fresh Pond reservation, one at Huron Avenue, and one at Mount Auburn Street, where it then crosses the town boundary of Watertown.

=== East Watertown ===
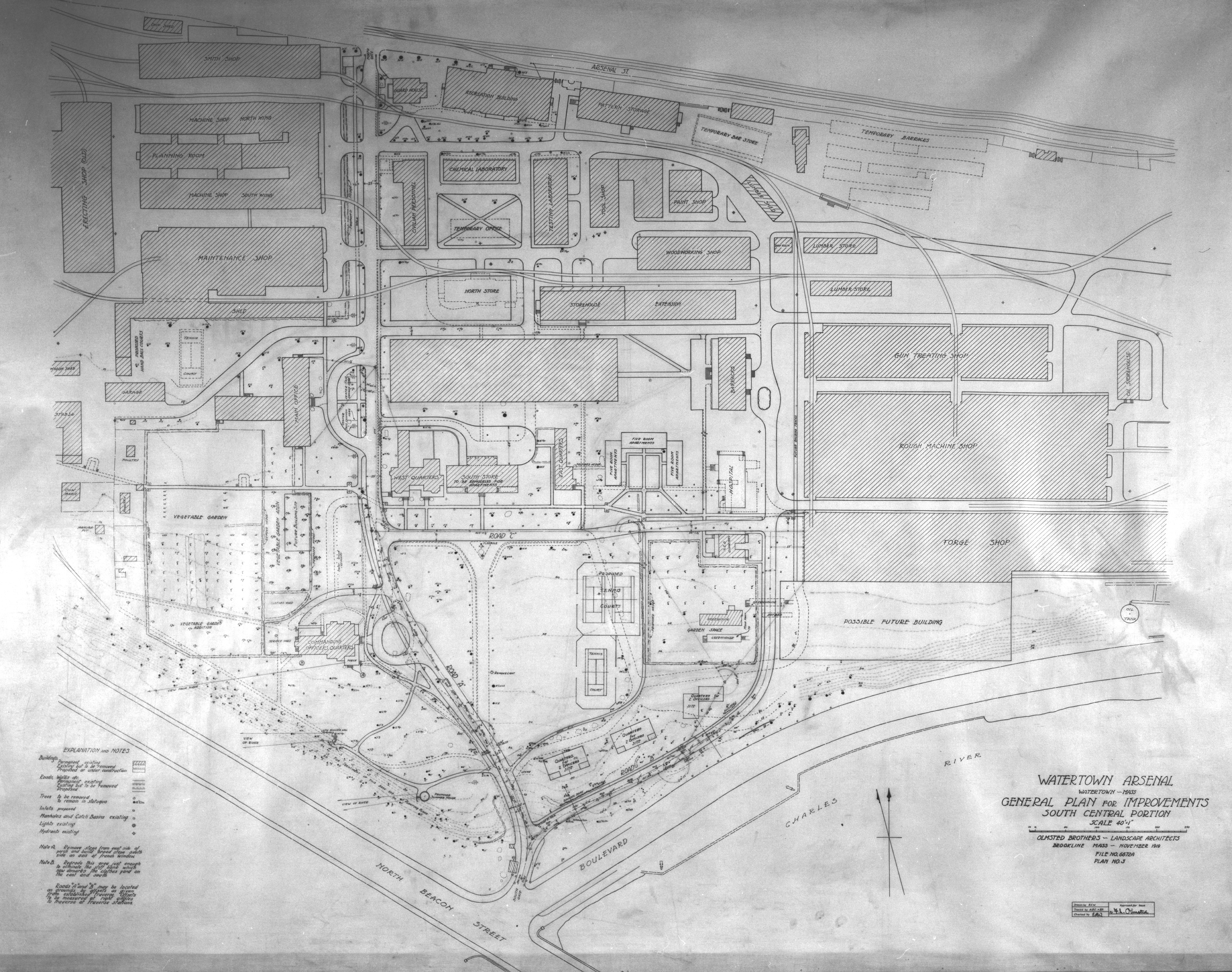
U.S. Army plans, highlighting sidings (top right) of the rail line at the Watertown Arsenal, ca. 1919

The line crosses Cottage Street at grade and Grove Street below grade. Further at-grade crossings were at School Street and at Mount Auburn Street just outside Watertown Square.

=== West Watertown to Waltham ===
The western portion of the branch continued past the Town Hall area, then headed southwest toward Main and Pleasant Streets (near Bacon and Howard Streets) and across Bridge Street in the Bemis Neighborhood of Watertown. Although much of the area has been built over, from there the line ran adjacent to Pleasant Street through what are now mainly parking lot areas, through the Quincy Cold Storage property (now Repton Place) on Pleasant Street, through the former Raytheon property in Waltham, and across River Street near Willow Street, before crossing the Charles River near the Bleachery Dam. The trestle for that crossing, approximately 140 years old, was dismantled and removed in August 2016. The line then crossed Calvary Street, then Newton Street, and proceeded across Pine Street before heading northwest, where it re-crossed the Charles, parallel to Elm Street. It then reached the Central Square area, and looped back into the Fitchburg Railroad main line.

=== Greenway ===
Phase I of the Watertown-Cambridge Greenway connects School Street to Arlington Street, in Watertown, with a branch to the Arsenal Mall. Phase II connects with Phase I at Arlington Street and continues just past the Walter J. Sullivan Water Treatment Facility where it connects with the existing Fresh Pond Trail. Planned renovations at the Arsenal Mall are expected to include a connection to the Charles River Bike Path. A several-block completed section of the proposed Watertown Community Path proceeds west along Arsenal street from School Street.

== Transformation to multi-use path ==
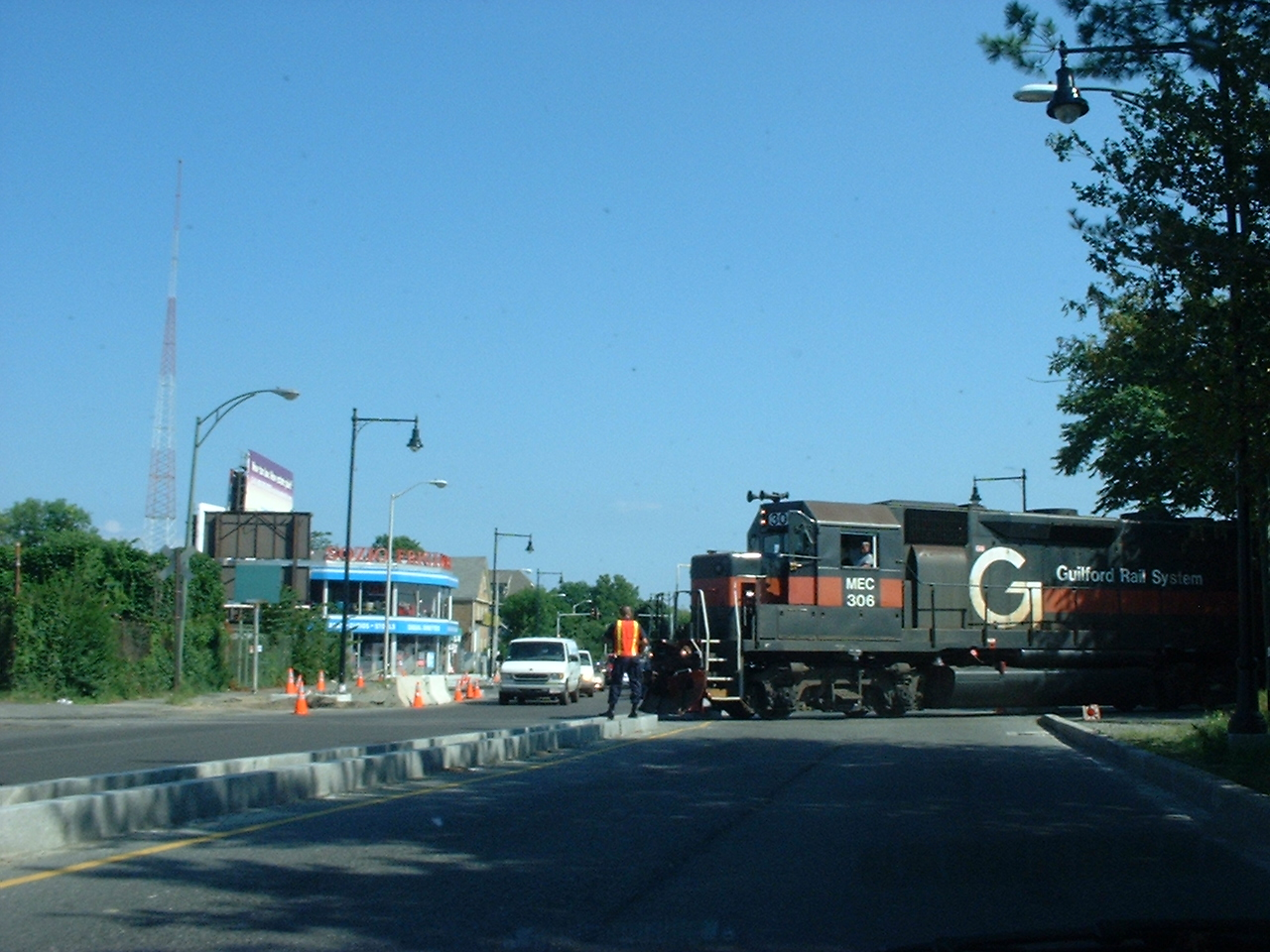
Concord Avenue - the rail line's non-gated and once busiest grade crossing

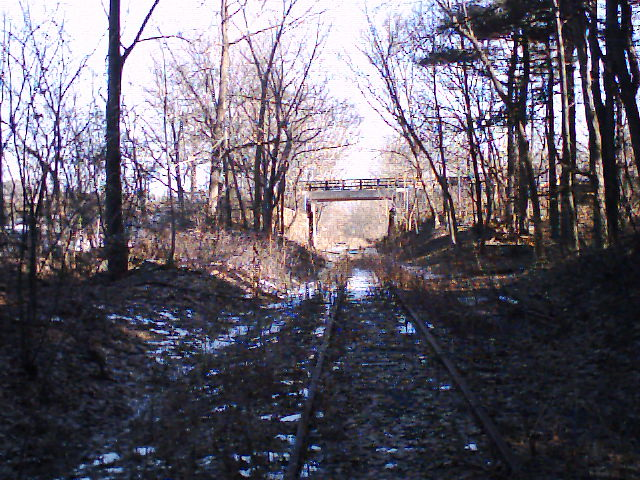
At Fresh Pond's Kingsley Park (looking north), Feb. 2010

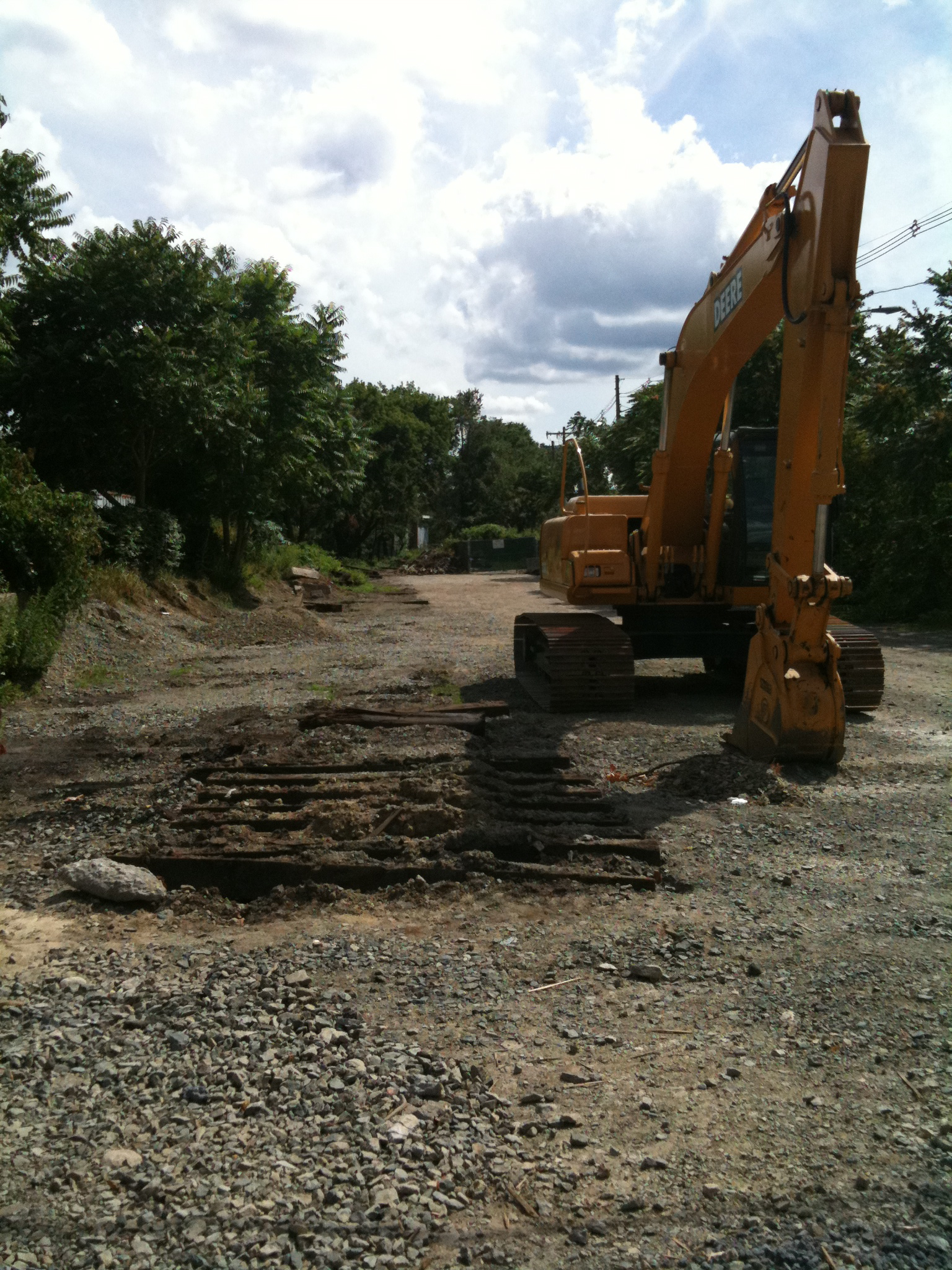
Construction begins on Phase 1 of the Charles River to Alewife Connector multi-use path, July 2010

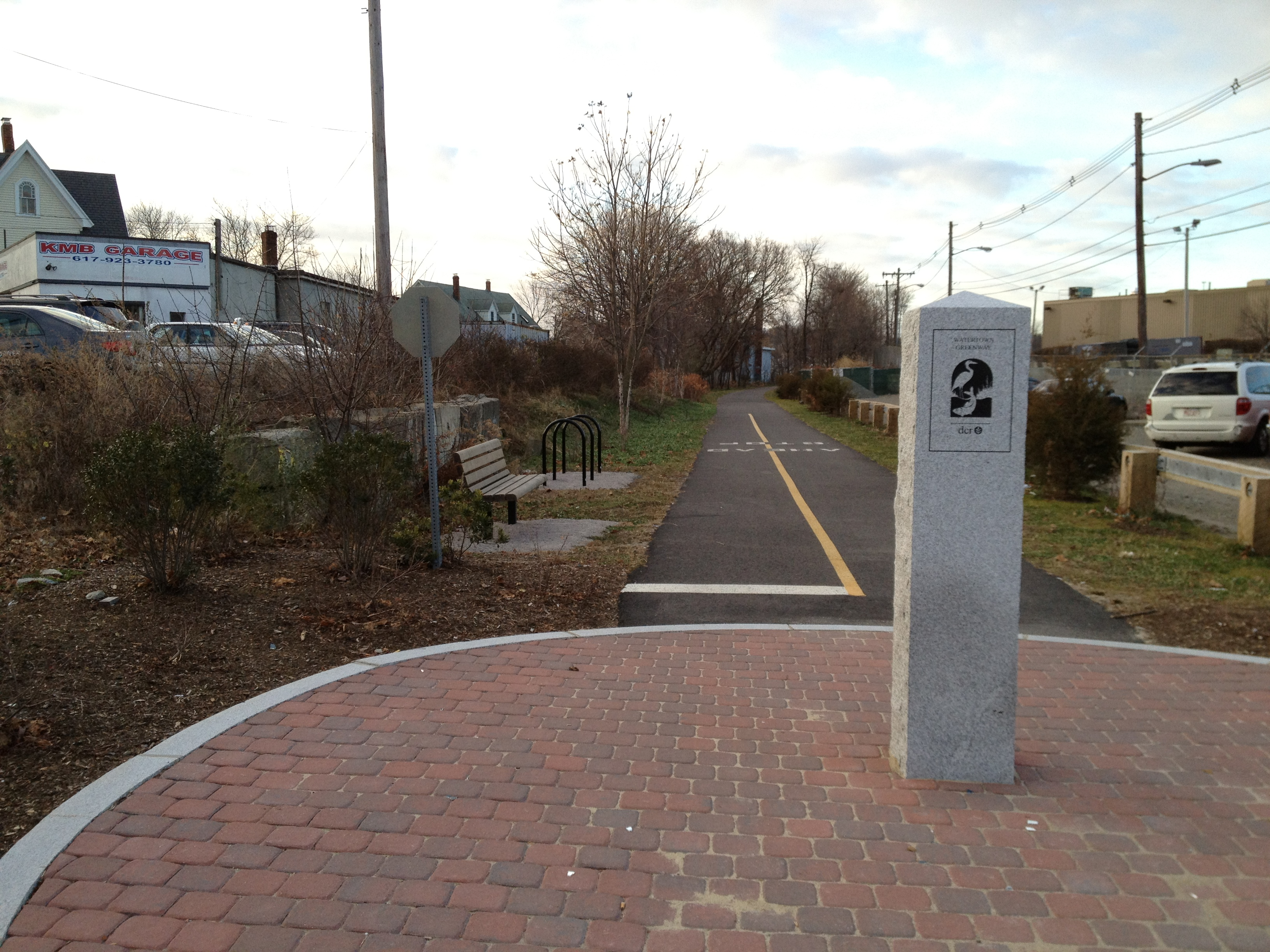
Entrance to the Watertown Greenway, a bike trail along a portion of the Watertown Branch Railroad

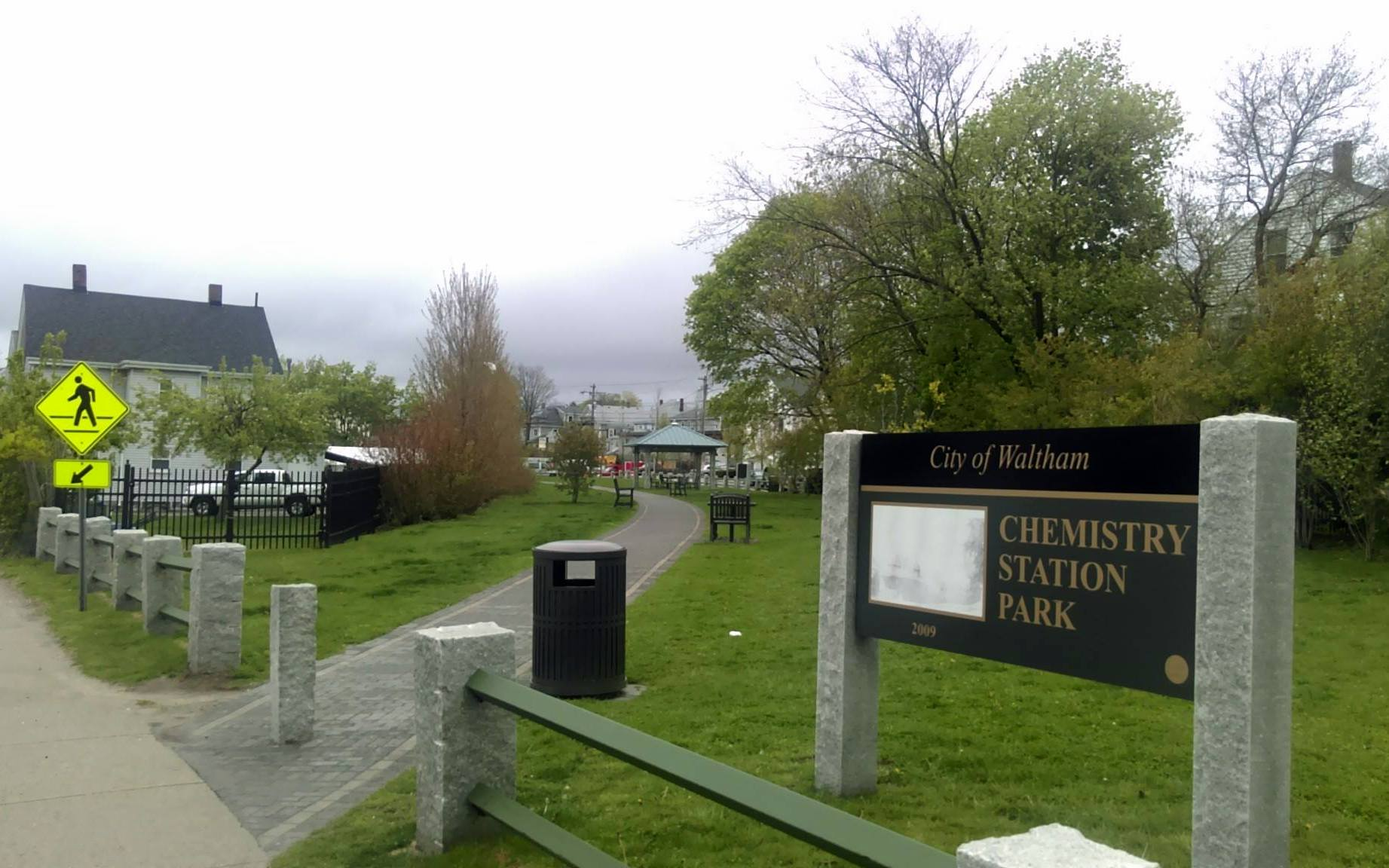
Entrance to Chemistry Station Park in Waltham, on the former site of Chemistry Station on the Watertown Branch in Waltham, MA.

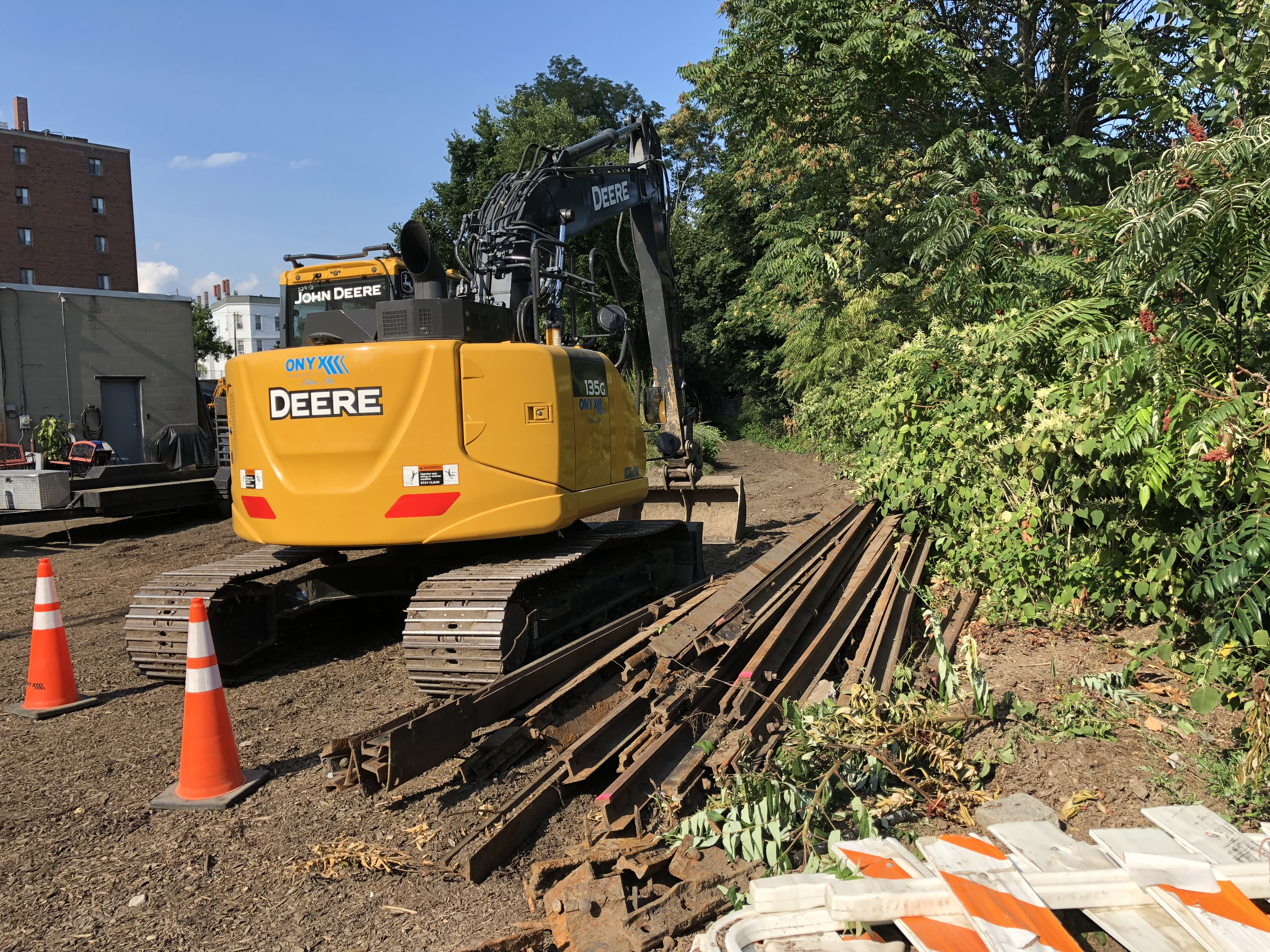
Excavator with rail removed from Watertown Branch for Phase II path construction, Sept. 2018

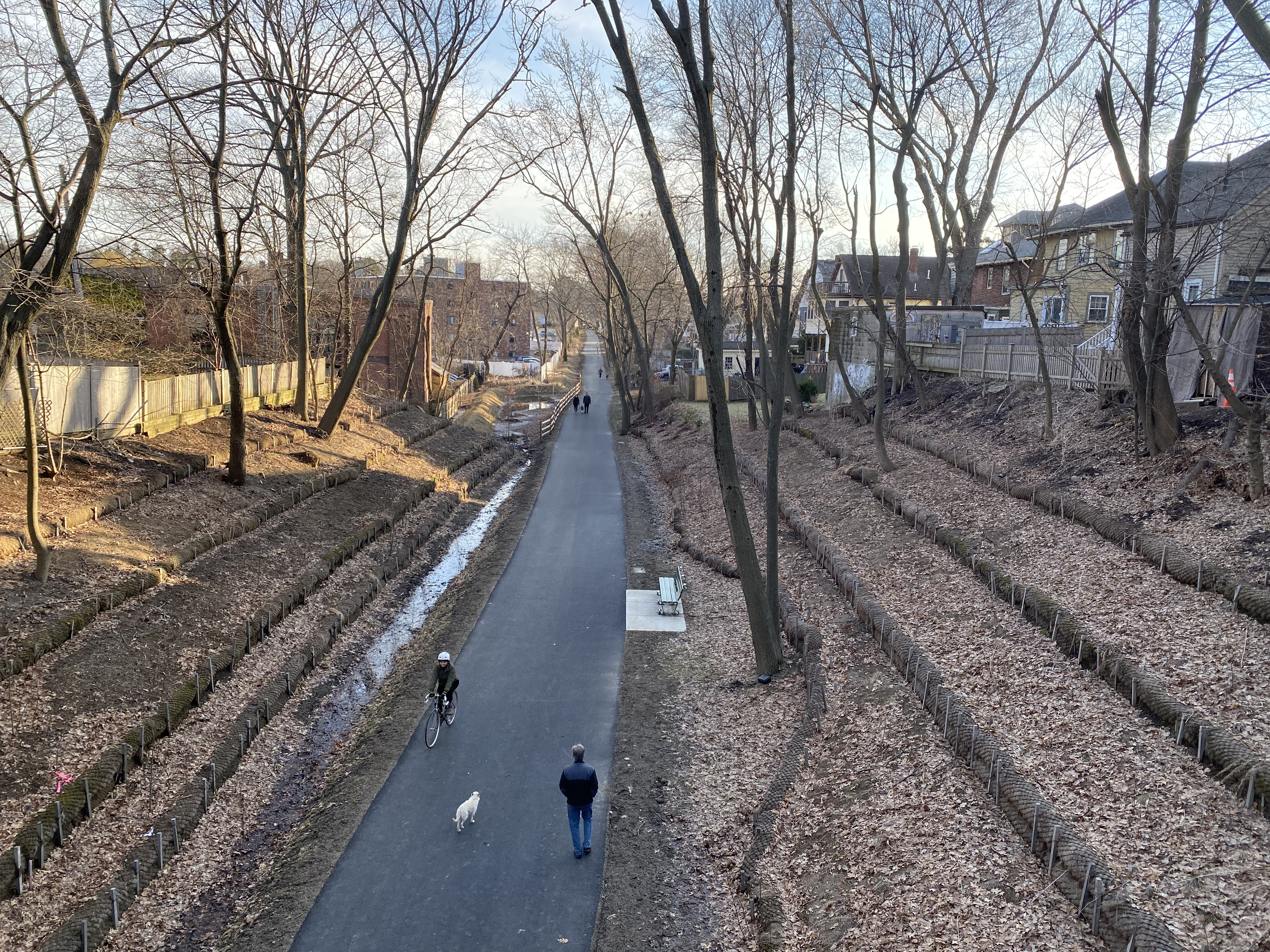
The almost-completed path just south of Fresh Pond in March 2022

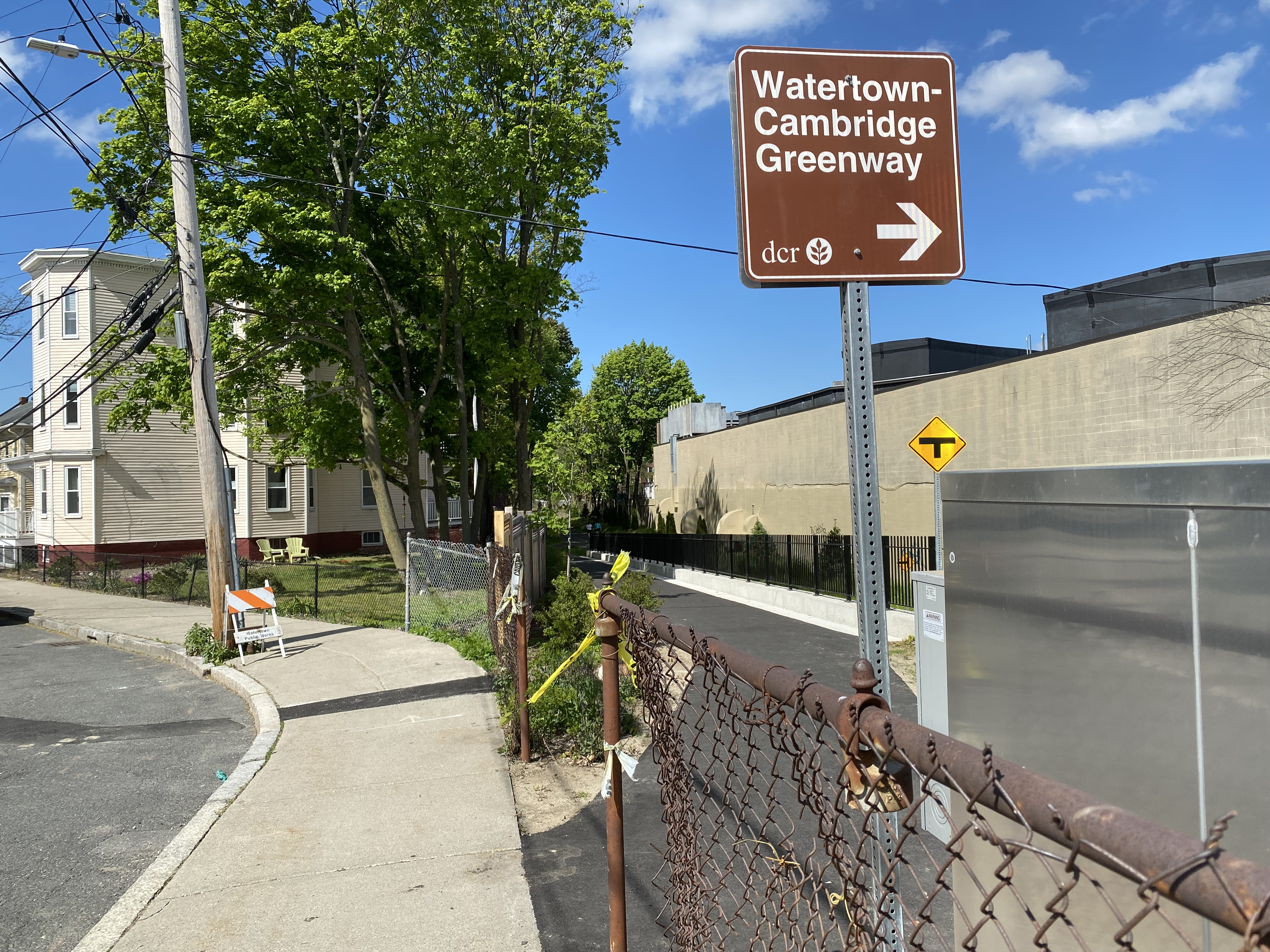
Holworthy St ramp, the last entry point to be completed, open in May 2022

== See also ==
- Minuteman Bikeway
- Alewife Linear Park
- Charles River Bike Path
