= Richard Fleischner =

American artist

- Born: New York City
- Occupation: artist
- Years active: 1960s–present

Richard Fleischner is a Providence, RI–based environmental artist. Born in New York in 1944, he received a BFA and MFA from the Rhode Island School of Design, and began working in the 1960s.

== Installations ==
Year	Name	Location	Description
1974	Sod Maze, for the exhibition Monumenta	Château-sur-Mer in Newport, Rhode Island	
1977	Floating Square	Documenta 6 in Kassel, Germany	
1984	La Jolla Project	Revelle College near Theatre District	
1985	Untitled	Alewife station, Cambridge, MA	A three-acre large environmental work containing an artificial pond and large granite blocks
1986	Columbia Subway Plaza	Broad and Cecil B. Moore, Philadelphia, PA	

== Awards ==
- Pell Award for Excellence in the Arts
- The Louis Comfort Tiffany Foundation Award
- National Endowment for the Arts Fellowships (1974, 1980, 1990)
