= Davis Square =

Neighborhood in Somerville, Massachusetts

Coordinates: 42.39638°N 71.12226°W

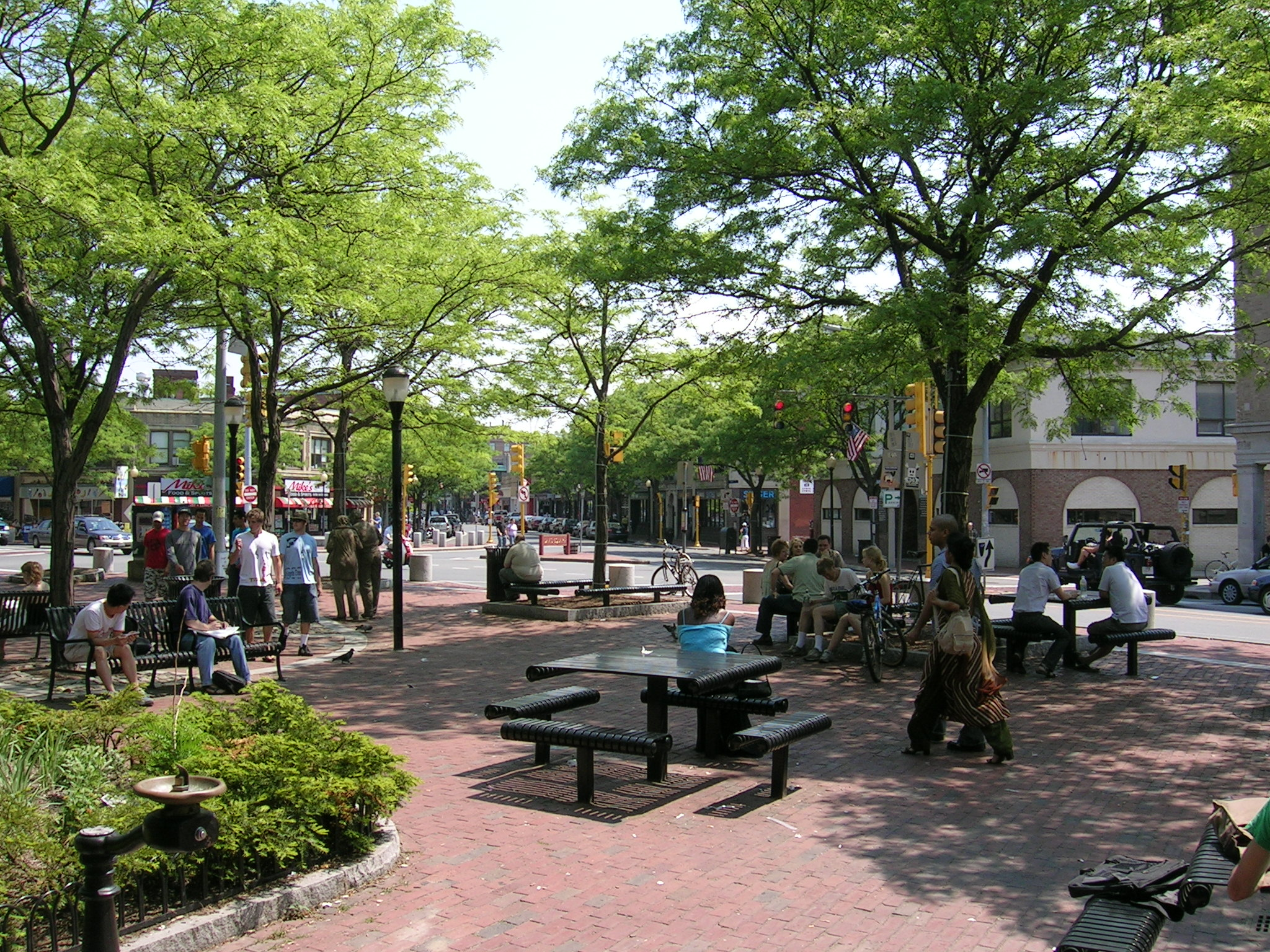
Davis Square in summer 2005

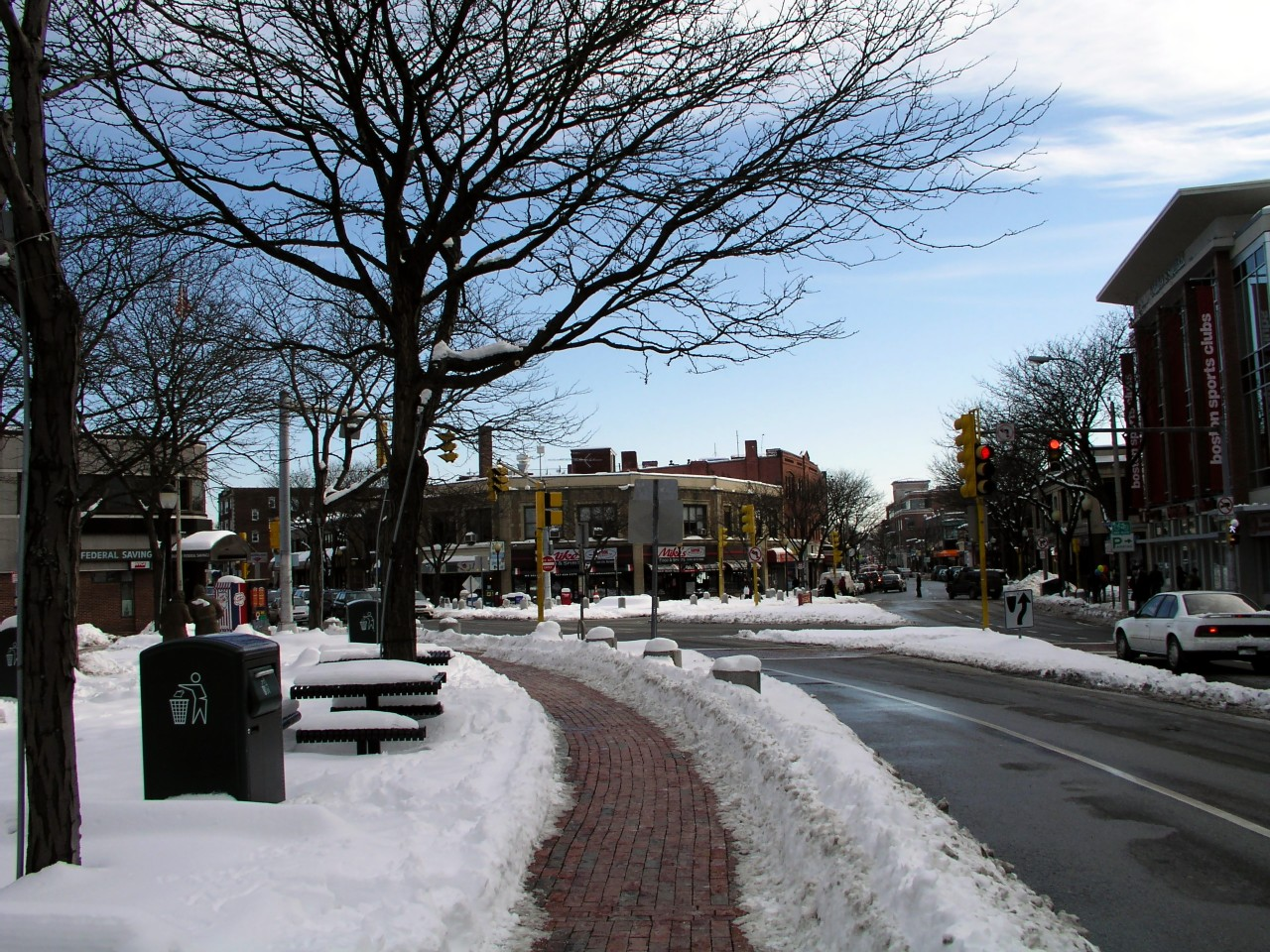
Davis Square in winter

Davis Square is a major intersection in the northwestern section of Somerville, Massachusetts, United States. Holland Street, Dover Street, Day Street, Elm Street, Highland Avenue, and College Avenue all meet there. The name is often also used to refer to the West Somerville neighborhood surrounding the square.

Davis Square is located approximately four miles from downtown Boston, and two miles from mid-Cambridge. The square is served by the Davis Square Station, one of the stops on the MBTA subway's Red Line. Davis abuts the Powder House Square, Ball Square and Spring Hill neighborhoods, as well as Tufts University.

Davis Square is today a vibrant commercial, retail, nightlife and dining district. Businesses in Davis range from stores to restaurants to even a martial arts school. Davis fell into decline after World War II. After the Red Line was extended to Davis in 1984, however, the area began to experience a prolonged renaissance.

== History ==
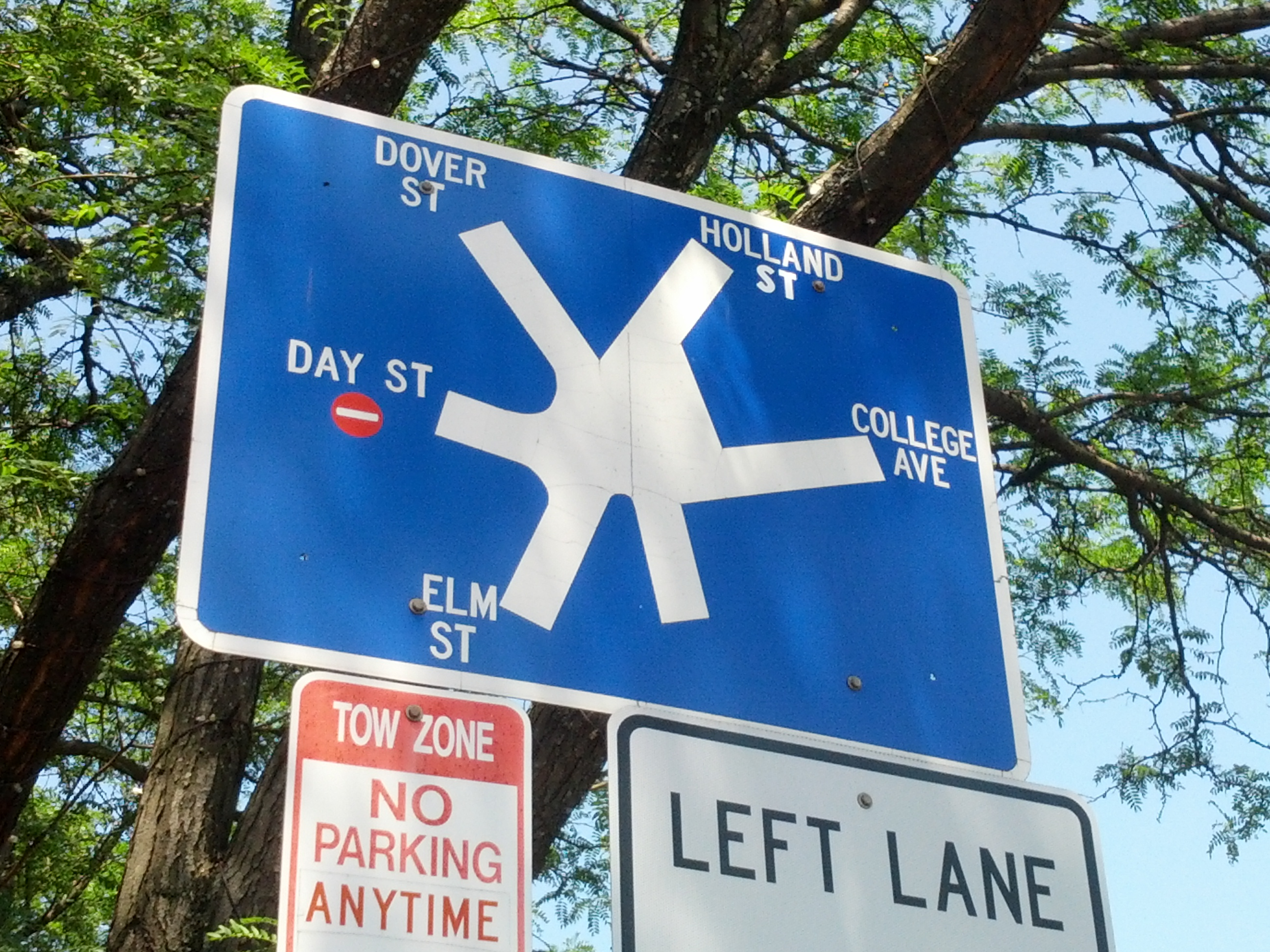
Sign showing intersecting streets of Davis Square. North is approximately to the right.

Davis Square was officially designated as a square by the City of Somerville in 1883. It was named for Person Davis (1819-1894), a grain dealer who moved to the area in 1850 and built his estate near the intersection of Elm, Grove and Morrison Streets. Davis was both a Somerville selectman and alderman. During the 1860s and 1870s, roads were improved and rail connections strengthened, which allowed West Somerville to urbanize.

After the Civil War, between 1870 and 1910, people increasingly chose to live in West Somerville where subdivided land was plentiful for new homes, both modest and substantial, and the commute to Boston for employment was convenient thanks to rail connections. By 1857 horse car railway lines were extended along Massachusetts Avenue (then called North Avenue) from Harvard Square to Arlington, and in 1863 the Somerville Horse Railroad Company connected Union Square with West Somerville via extended tracks along Somerville Avenue. Passenger rail arrived in 1870, when the Lexington and Arlington branch of the Boston and Lowell Railroad (later succeeded by the Boston and Maine Railroad) routed steam rail service through Davis Square. These public improvements stimulated substantial development in the 1870s and 1880s as Davis Square quickly grew into an active commercial center. A boom in residential construction followed in the 1890s.

Brick paving was introduced in Davis Square in 1900 and the area continued to be a vibrant commercial and transportation center until post-World War II, with the exodus to the suburbs and the decline of urban centers throughout the nation. In 1914, the Somerville Theater opened, hosting silent films as well as burlesque shows. In 1927, the trains that had brought many people to Davis Square were re-routed. This also contributed to Davis Square's decline in the middle part of the 20th century. Factories shut, businesses failed and residents began to move out to the suburbs. As a result, Davis Square lost many of its tenants and became home to "burn-out storefronts" and "bars where motorcycle gangs hung out." According to a planning study completed in 1980, Davis Square suffered from "a lack of competitiveness among merchants, traffic congestion, inadequate parking and an increasingly deteriorated physical environment."

The situation began to turn around in the late 1970s thanks largely to two entities: the Somerville Office of Planning and Community Development, and the Davis Square Task Force. Their efforts culminated in the Davis Square Action Plan, which was adopted in 1982.

In the meantime, local officials and citizen groups petitioned the Massachusetts Bay Transportation Authority (MBTA) to create a Red Line subway stop in Somerville at Davis Square. The MBTA agreed and in 1977 business owners and other local residents and officials formed the Davis Square Task Force to act as a citizen advisory committee on community revitalization plans. By the early 1980s, grassroots ideas about new civic spaces, new job and housing opportunities and safe walking connections to surrounding neighborhoods became part of the discussion around the Davis Square train station.

With input from the Davis Square Task Force, the city made the Red Line station the cornerstone for downtown redevelopment. The goal was to strengthen commercial interests while preserving the residential character of the neighborhood. The 1982 Davis Square Action plan set forth the framework that led to the Somerville Community Path, the Harvard Vanguard office building, Buena Vista parking garage and Ciampa Manor senior housing building.

At the heart of Davis Square is a complex, busy six-point intersection, which was radically configured as part of the plan. Until the reconfiguration, two major, pedestrian-unfriendly streets bisected the square; crosswalks, sidewalks, curb extensions and refuge islands were added to enhance pedestrian capacity, circulation and safety. Additionally, several freight trains had run right through the square each day on the Boston and Maine Railroad, forcing traffic to back up for long periods of time.

The MBTA developed a central plaza linking the two station entrance buildings, built on the old railroad right-of-way. This plaza replaced a poorly defined open area containing at-grade parking spaces and debris. The plaza was designed to serve as the center of Davis Square, a gathering place and center for activities, including outdoor entertainment. The plaza and the station were both eligible for state percent-for-art moneys through the Arts on the Line program. One percent of the cost of constructing the new station entrances was used to commission several figurative sculptures including the Davis Square statues.

The city of Somerville and the Task Force initiated many other projects to accompany the Red Line extension and Davis Square improvements. Property redevelopment activities included a storefront and facade improvement grant program, financing for building renovations, and designation of a portion of Davis Square as an urban renewal district. Property acquisition, clearance, infrastructure upgrades, and development took place within the boundaries of this district.

The district was later developed as a 100,000 square foot office and retail complex, including public open space and a parking garage that serves patrons and employees of local businesses.

In 1997, Davis Square was listed by the Utne Reader as one of the fifteen "hippest places to live" in the United States. This reputation has continued; in 2016, real estate company Cushman & Wakefield rated Davis Square as one of "Top 100 Cool Streets" in North America, giving it a score of "Prime Hipness".

In 2005, The Boston Globe reported the first million dollar condo sale in Davis Square, which marked a major shift for a neighborhood once known as affordable and working-class. It now contains some of the priciest homes in Somerville and is significantly more expensive than the average for eastern Massachusetts.

== Transportation ==
Davis Square is served by the MBTA subway's Red Line, extended from Harvard to Alewife via Porter and Davis in the 1980s, with the Davis station opening on December 8, 1984. Additionally, Davis Square connects to several MBTA bus lines leading to nearby towns.

As part of the Davis Square Plan, the old Boston and Maine Railroad right-of-way was converted into a mixed-use path, the Somerville Community Path. Most of the remaining railroad right-of-way between Davis Square and the Red Line's northern terminus at Alewife was redeveloped and landscaped as a linear park or bicycle/pedestrian pathway. A public park was constructed directly behind the Holland Street MBTA head house as part of a later project. The Alewife Linear Park connects Alewife MBTA station with the Minuteman Bikeway, a 10-mile bicycle path that leads to Bedford.

== Arts and culture ==
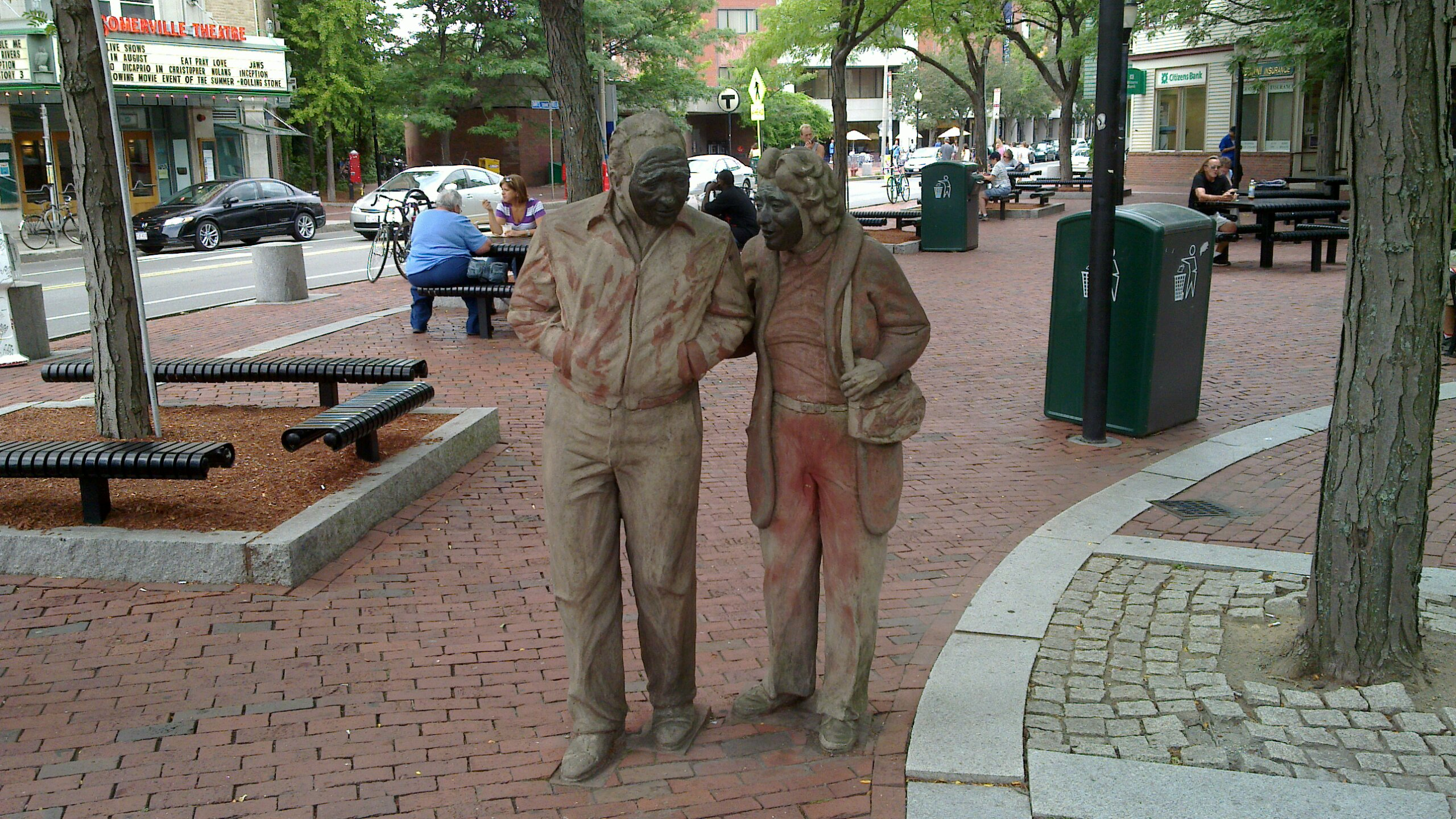
One of the Davis Square statues

In the past three decades, Davis has become a regional center for retail, nightlife, and dining. Davis Square contains over 200 businesses including healthcare and high-tech corporations, national non-profits, and media offices. Boston Magazine notes half a dozen food and entertainment establishments dating from before the Red Line still extant in 2012, including the Somerville Theatre, The Rosebud, McKinnon's Meat Market, and a candlepin bowling alley.

The Somerville Theatre shows movies, live performances, and hosted a satellite gallery of the Museum of Bad Art until a 2019 renovation. The Public Radio International show, Living on Earth is recorded in its studios in Davis Square. For five years, the Jimmy Tingle Off-Broadway Theater boasted a variety of nationally and regionally known acts, both comedic and musical, including Jimmy Tingle himself, but closed at the end of October 2007.

Davis Square is host to several popular festivals and events throughout the year. The Somerville Arts Council's popular ArtBeat festival takes place here every year on the third weekend of July, while the HONK! Festival of activist brass bands occurs here every October. During the summer months there are free public folk dances.
