= Davis Square statues =

Sculptures in Somerville, Massachusetts, U.S.

Ten Figures
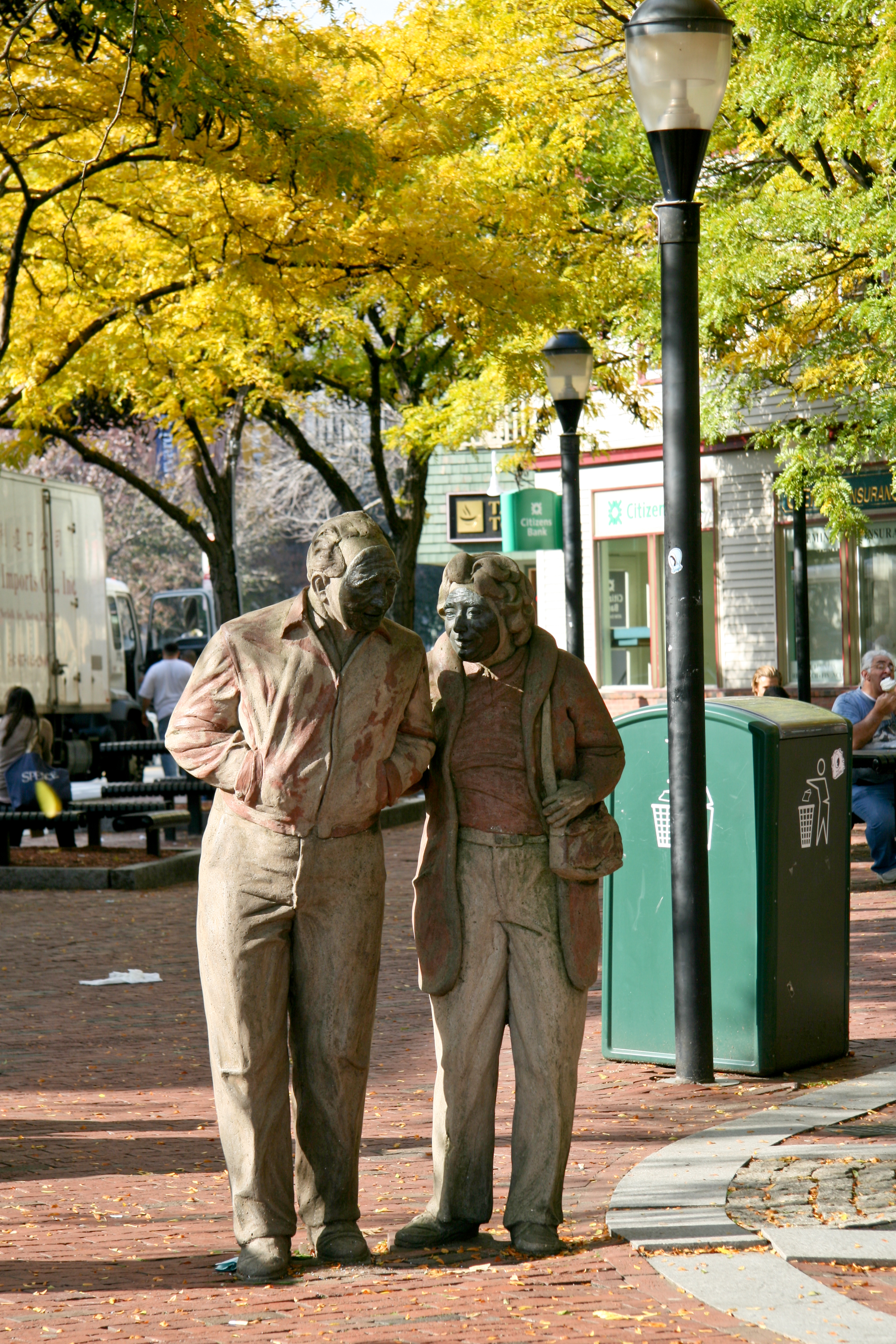
- Artist: James Tyler
- Year: 1983
- Type: Concrete, bronze
- Location: Davis Station and nearby Davis Square, Somerville, Massachusetts; 42°23′48.2″N 71°07′20.7″W
- Owner: Massachusetts Bay Transportation Authority

The Davis Square statues, entitled Ten Figures, are life-sized cast concrete public sculpture, created by James Tyler in 1983, located in Davis Square, Somerville, Massachusetts near the Davis station of the Massachusetts Bay Transportation Authority subway. The statues are mostly based on people who lived near Davis Square in the 1980s. In 1996 bronze "masks" were added to the sculptures to repair damage and deter future vandalism.

== Arts on the Line ==
The sculptures were created as a part of the MBTA and the Cambridge Arts Council's Arts on the Line program. This first of its kind program was devised to bring art into the MBTA's planned Northwest Extension of the Red Line subway stations in the late 1970s and early 1980s, and became a model for similar drives for public art across the country. The statues were one of 20 artworks created for this program, out of over 400 proposals submitted by artists for artworks spread out across five different newly created subway stations. The first 20 artworks, including this one, were completed with a total cost of US$695,000, or one-half of one percent of the total construction cost of the Red Line Northwest Extension.

== History ==
The statues in Davis Square are almost all based on actual people who lived in or around the square. For instance, one of the statues is of an elderly man and woman standing arm in arm; it depicts a couple who owned a little restaurant. "They were the nicest people you'd ever meet in your whole life", said a woman who knew them, "If you didn't have a dime, you could still get a nice dinner for nothing". The sculptor added a fictional mime, who performs for a teenager (who was killed in Vietnam in 1969), accompanied by his mother.

The statues are composed of cast concrete, and were all originally located in one plaza, in front of J.P. Licks and a Store 24. In 1996, the Somerville Arts Council, in conjunction with the city, chose to move the statues to their current locations all around Davis Square, in front of subway stations, and in other small parks nearby. Also in 1996, bronze "masks" were added to the statues. Steven Post stated, “the statues were meant to be ‘temporary’ in that they were not made of bronze. Vandals destroyed some of the faces of the statues over the years, so the artist and the city decided to replace the faces with the bronze 'mask' that the statues all now 'wear'.”

== See also ==
- Gift of the Wind
- Kendall Band
