= Untitled (Richard Fleischner artwork at Alewife station) =

1985 sculpture by Richard Fleischner

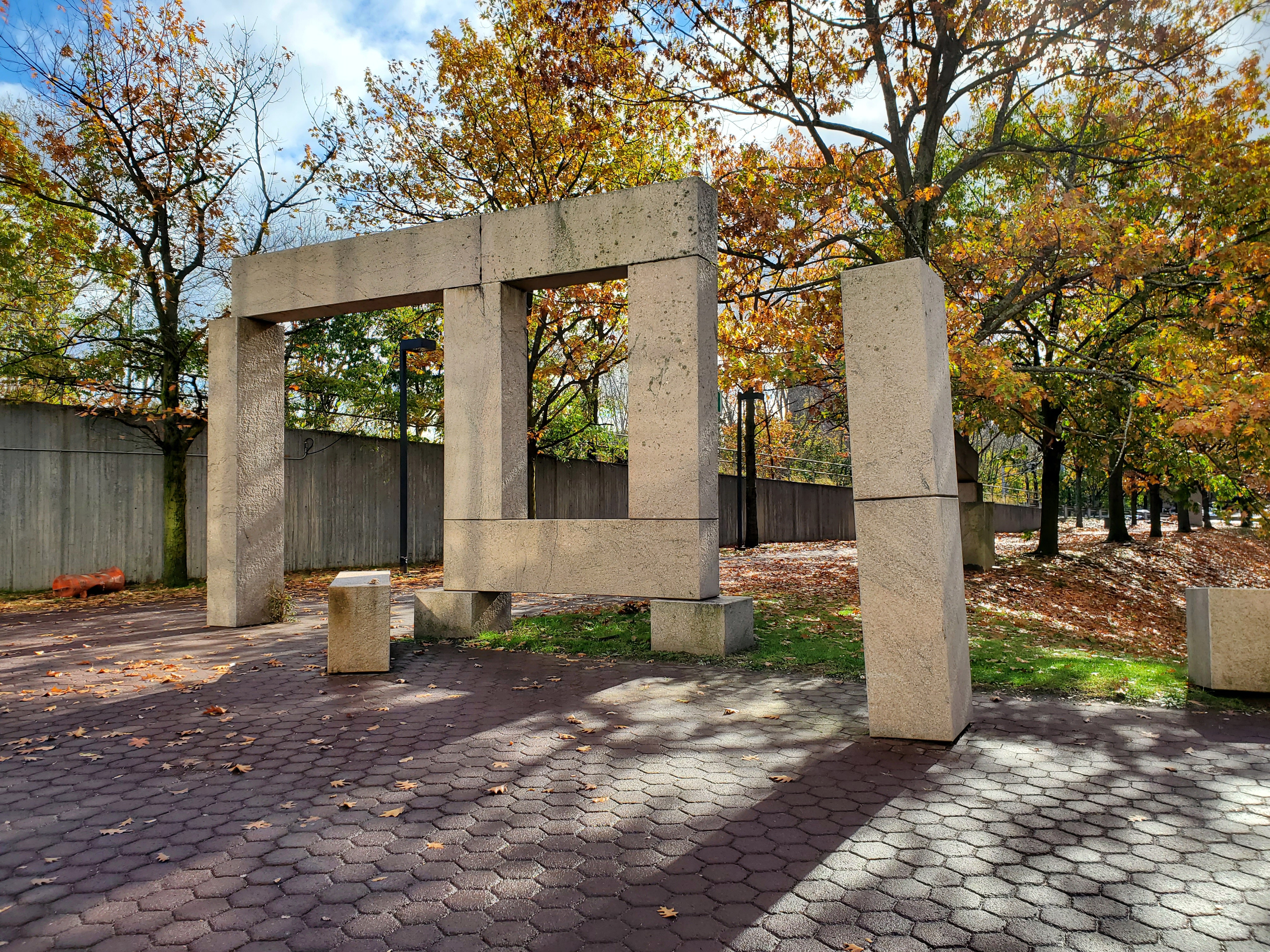
- Artist: Richard Fleischner
- Year: 1985
- Type: Installation art and landscape
- Medium: Granite
- Location: Alewife station; Cambridge, Massachusetts, US; 42.39564°N 71.14092°W
- Owner: Massachusetts Bay Transportation Authority

Untitled is a 1985 public art installation by American artist Richard Fleischner located in a courtyard adjacent to Alewife station on the Massachusetts Bay Transportation Authority (MBTA) Red Line in northwest Cambridge, Massachusetts, United States. The artwork – an environmental piece consisting of granite block designs among a landscape – cost $40,000 to create as part of the Arts on the Line program.

== Artwork ==
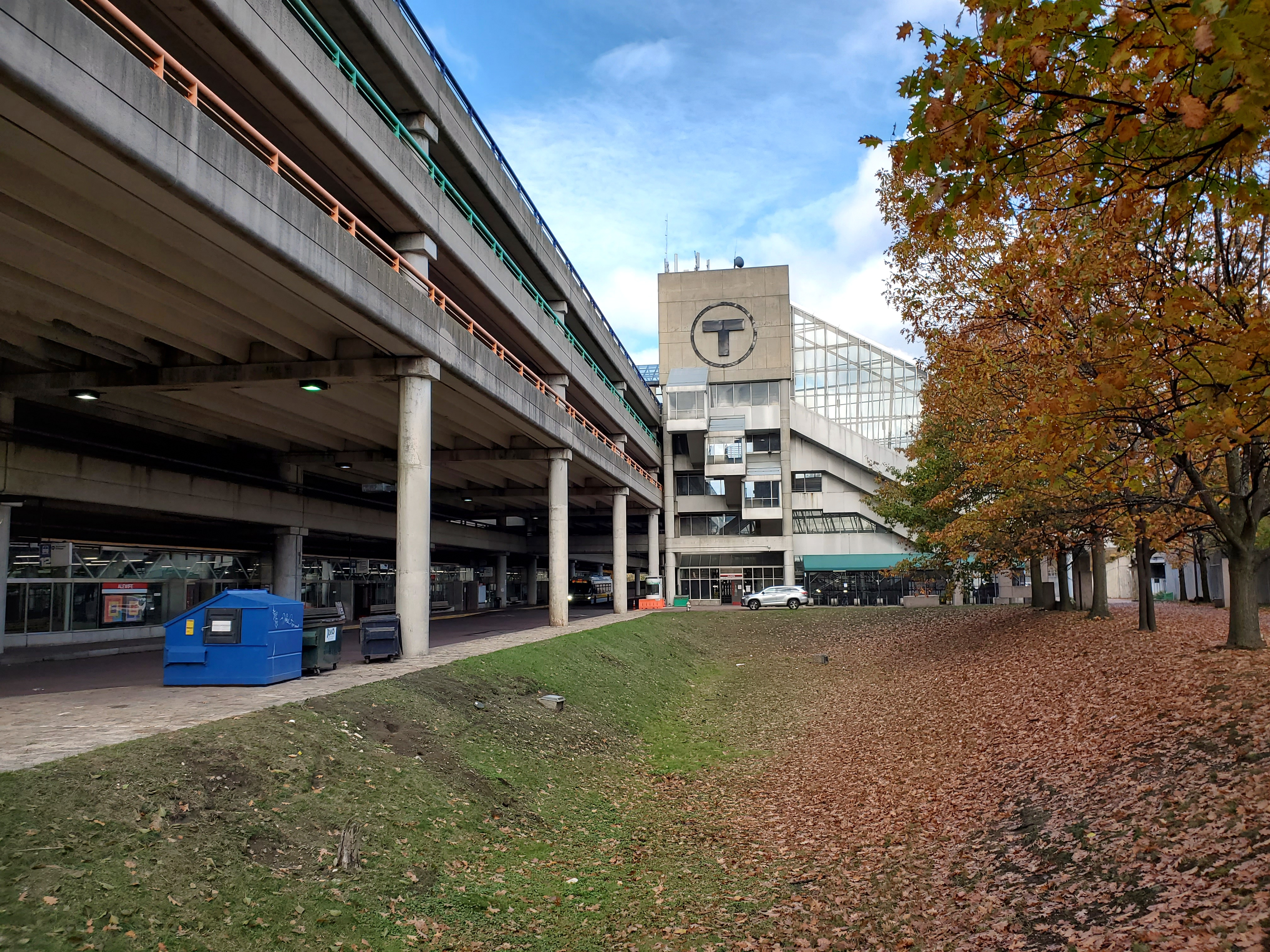
The artificial pond and trees next to the garage. The granite blocks are behind the trees at right.

Untitled is a large-scale outdoor piece, covering some 3 acres (12,000 m^{2}) on a parcel of land nested between Alewife Brook Parkway (MA-2/US-3/MA-16), the main station entrance, and the five-story parking garage. An elongated artificial pond is surrounded by a grassy area with trees and decorative pavers, intended to be a "usable space for MBTA commuters and community residents" while also serving as part of the drainage system necessary for the large concrete garage structure. Like several other works from the Arts on the Line project, Untitled includes stone monoliths. Arranged around one corner of the work, the large granite bollards are arranged mostly horizontally and vertical save for one angled block resting upon two others. The blocks were designed to be durable, lasting as long as 75 years, as per City of Cambridge public art standards applied to the project.

Untitled incorporates various elements of Fleischner's artistic style. Fleischner was primarily known at the time as an environmental sculptor who had created installations like "The Maze", an outdoor metal labyrinth at University of Massachusetts Amherst, and Untitled was intended as environmentally beneficial to the station area as well as merely artistic. Other works of his also include monolithic, rectangular granite components as parts of large-scale sculptures.

== History ==
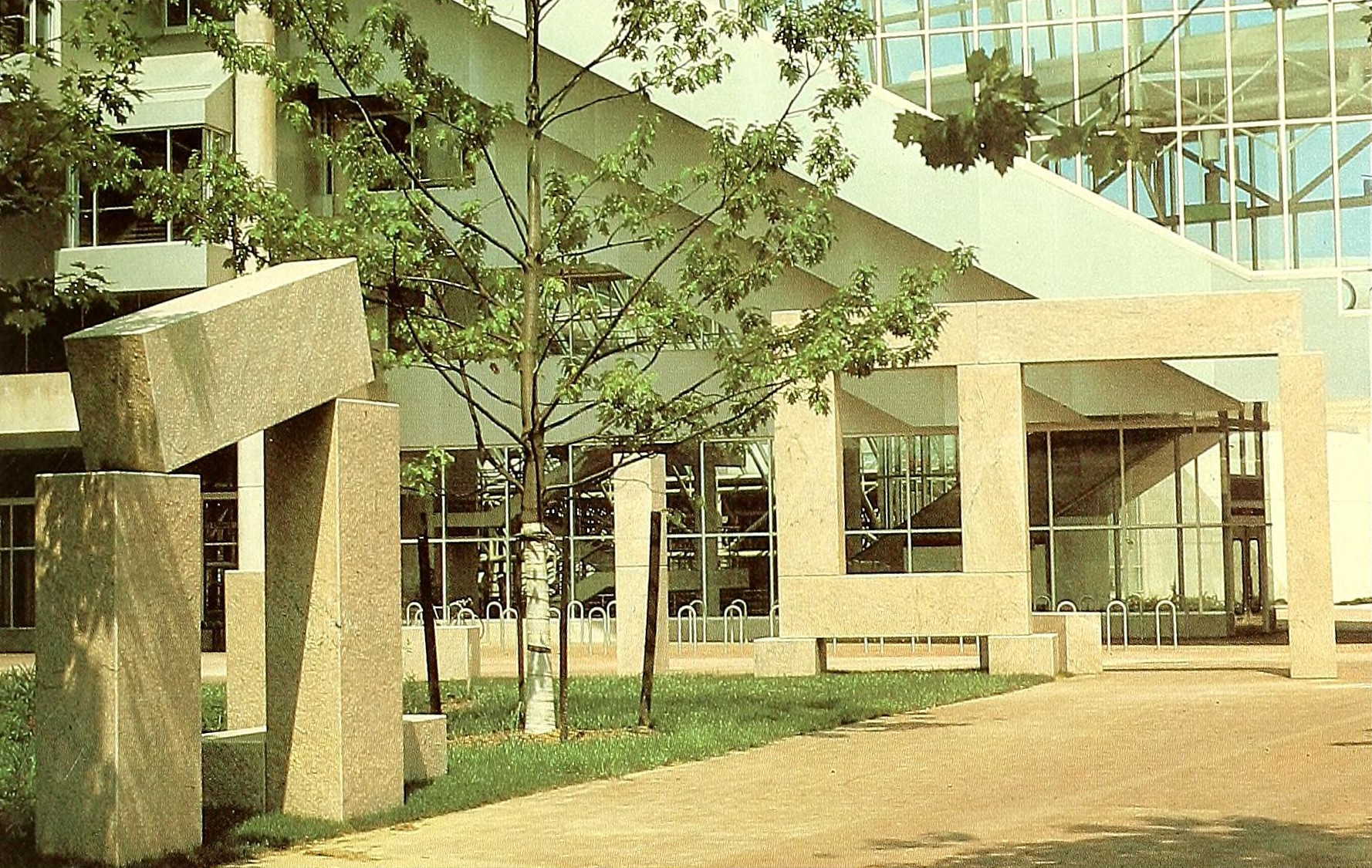
The artwork in 1985

Untitled was created as a part of the MBTA and the Cambridge Arts Council's Arts on the Line program. This first of its kind program was devised to bring art into the MBTA's planned Northwest Extension of the Red Line subway stations in the late 1970s and early 1980s, and became a model for similar drives for public art across the country. This installation was one of 20 artworks created for this program, out of over 400 proposals submitted by artists for artworks spread out across five different newly created subway stations. The first 20 artworks, including Untitled, were completed with a total cost of $695,000 (equivalent to $1,720,000 in 2024) – one-half of one percent of the total construction cost of the Red Line Northwest Extension. Untitled was funded in 1980 by a $40,000 grant (equivalent to $99,000 in 2024) from the National Endowment for the Arts. It was one of six works at Alewife funded by the program.

Many artworks in the project produced friction between artists and architects, and Untitled was no exception. Harry Ellenzweig, who designed the brutalist station and parking garage, wanted the planned trees removed from Fleischner's design. Pallas Lombardi, who directed much of the Arts on the Line project and served as a liaison with the Cambridge City Council, recalled in a 1987 article that "Harry insisted that Richard not plant trees along the garage, saying bus exhaust would kill them, but I think perhaps he didn't want trees hiding his beautiful garage." However, the artwork as finally built includes a row of trees along a footpath running around the pond. Alewife station opened to the public on March 30, 1985, though some landscaping work was still underway.
