= Alewife station =

Rapid transit station in Cambridge, Massachusetts, US

Alewife
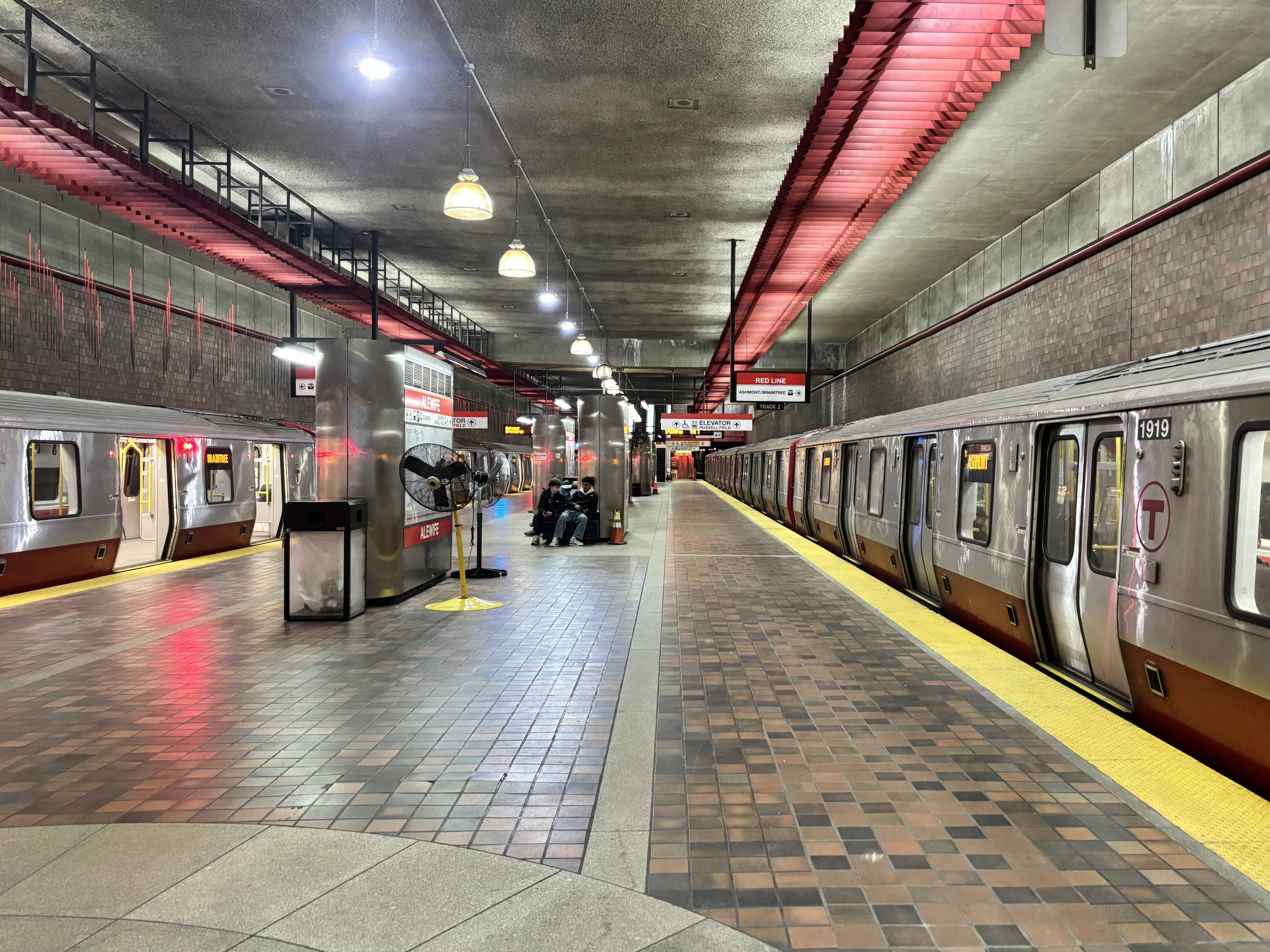
- Two trains at Alewife station in December 2025

General information
- Location: 11 Cambridgepark West; Cambridge, Massachusetts
- Coordinates: 42.3961°N 71.1413°W
- Line: Red Line Northwest Extension
- Platforms: 1 island platform
- Tracks: 2
- Connections: MBTA bus: 62, 67, 76, 83, 350; 128 Business Council: A1, A2, A3, A5, A6, R1, R2; Go Bus

Construction
- Structure type: Underground
- Parking: 2,733 spaces in garage
- Cycle facilities: Three bike cages plus racks
- Accessible: Yes

History
- Opened: March 30, 1985

Passengers
- FY2019: 11,514 daily boardings

Services
| Preceding station | MBTA | Following station |
|---|---|---|
| Terminus | Red Line | Davis toward Ashmont or Braintree |
Track layout
Location

Alewife station is a Massachusetts Bay Transportation Authority (MBTA) intermodal transit station in the North Cambridge neighborhood of Cambridge, Massachusetts. It is the northwest terminal of the rapid transit Red Line (part of the MBTA subway system) and a hub for several MBTA bus routes. The station is at the confluence of the Minuteman Bikeway, Alewife Linear Park, Fitchburg Cutoff Path, and Alewife Greenway off Alewife Brook Parkway adjacent to Massachusetts Route 2, with a five-story parking garage for park and ride use. The station has three bike cages. Alewife station is named after nearby Alewife Brook Parkway and Alewife Brook, themselves named after the alewife fish.

The Fitchburg Railroad (now the MBTA Commuter Rail Fitchburg Line) opened through North Cambridge in 1842, followed by the now-closed Lexington Branch and Fitchburg Cutoff branch lines. An extension of the 1912-opened Cambridge–Dorchester line to North Cambridge was first proposed in the 1930s, though planning for the project did not begin until the 1960s. The Red Line Northwest Extension project included a station at Alewife Brook Parkway to capture traffic from Route 2, as a planned extension of the highway was cancelled in 1970. Construction began in 1979; with the planned route to Arlington Heights rejected by Arlington, Alewife became the terminus of the extension.

Alewife station opened on March 30, 1985, though some peak-hour service did not run to the station until that December. The station has a single underground island platform, with a busway and glass-roofed fare lobby inside the parking garage. Ramps connecting the garage to Route 2 opened in 1986. The station spurred transit-oriented development on formerly industrial land in the surrounding area. The station features six works of public art built under the Arts on the Line program.

== Station layout ==
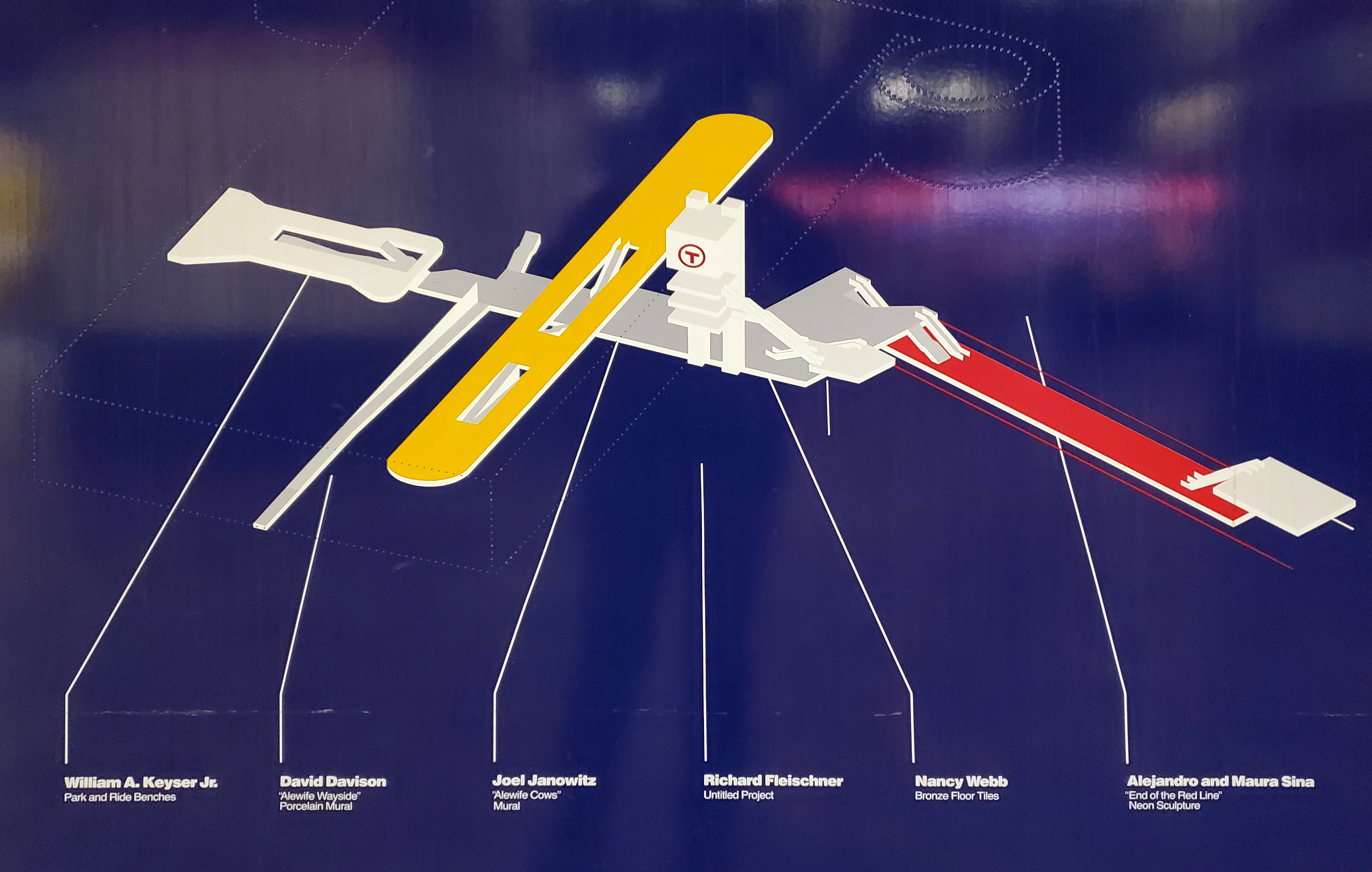
Isometric view of the station showing the locations of public artworks

Alewife station has one underground island platform serving two tracks. Both tracks are used for boarding and alighting; a scissors crossover east of the station allows arriving and departing trains to switch tracks. A three-track underground yard extends about one-third mile (0.5 km) northwest past the station for use as layup tracks and overnight storage.

A five-story, 2,733-space parking garage is located just west of the station platform, with vehicle entrance and exit at its northwest side. The first floor of the garage includes a 450-foot (140 m)-long enclosed bus platform with bus bays on both sides, as well as two bike cages. Pedestrian entrances to the garage are on the south (Cambridgepark Drive) and west (Steel Place) sides. A below-ground concourse runs east–west under the garage, with ramps to the bus platform. The garage is bisected by an elongated atrium, which has red exhaust pipes on one side to ventilate the bus platform.

East of the garage, the concourse widens into an atrium covered with a glass pyramid, with faregates and access to the platform on the north side. A third bike cage is located on the south side of the glass pyramid, under escalators connecting the atrium to the garage levels. A freestanding headhouse connects to the east end of the platform. Elevators connect both ends of the platform to the fare lobbies, making the station fully accessible. The walls and floors of the station are finished with brown Welsh quarry tiles with granite highlights. The Minuteman Bikeway and Fitchburg Cutoff Path meet at the northwest corner of the garage; the Alewife Linear Park runs along the north side of the garage and past the east headhouse.

=== Bus connections ===
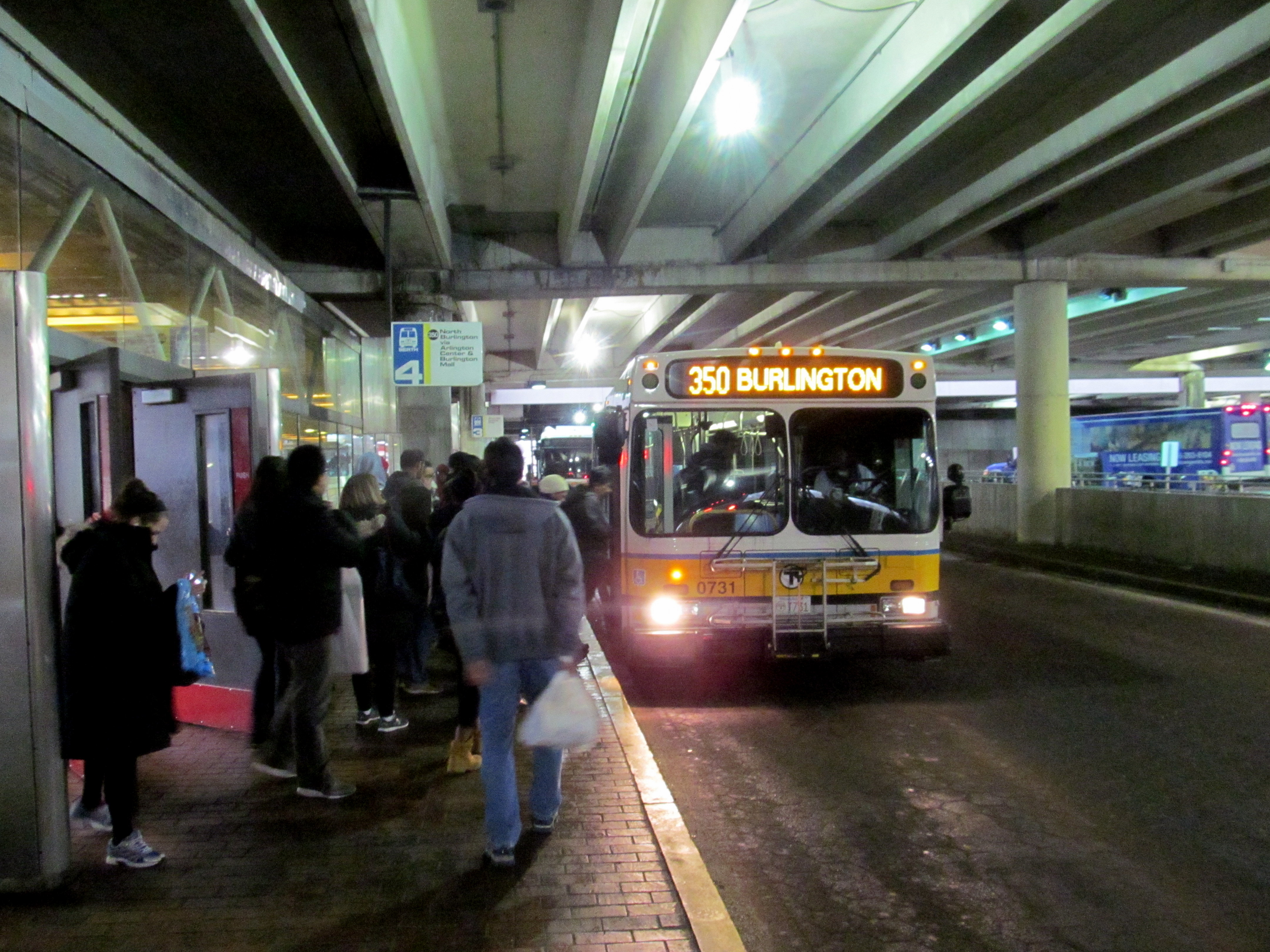
A route 350 bus boarding at Alewife in 2017

Four MBTA bus routes – 62, 67, 76, and 350 – terminate at the busway inside the Alewife garage. The routes serve northwestern suburbs including Arlington, Lexington, and Burlington. Route 83 terminates nearby at Russell Field because is not possible to turn left from Alewife Brook Parkway onto Rindge Avenue, preventing the bus from serving Alewife directly. The bus stop is connected to Alewife by a short spur of the Cambridge Linear Park.

Alewife station is also served by bus routes operated by private carriers:

- The Route 128 Business Council operates shuttle bus services from Alewife to companies along the Route 2 and Route 128 corridors. Seven routes to Waltham and Lexington are open to all riders; one private residential route is also run.
- Go Bus (formerly World Wide Bus) operates intercity bus service between Alewife, Riverside, and New York City. The service began in October 2010.
- The Middlesex 3 Transportation Management Association and the Alewife Transportation Management Association both operate private shuttle services terminating at Alewife.

== History ==
=== Railroads ===
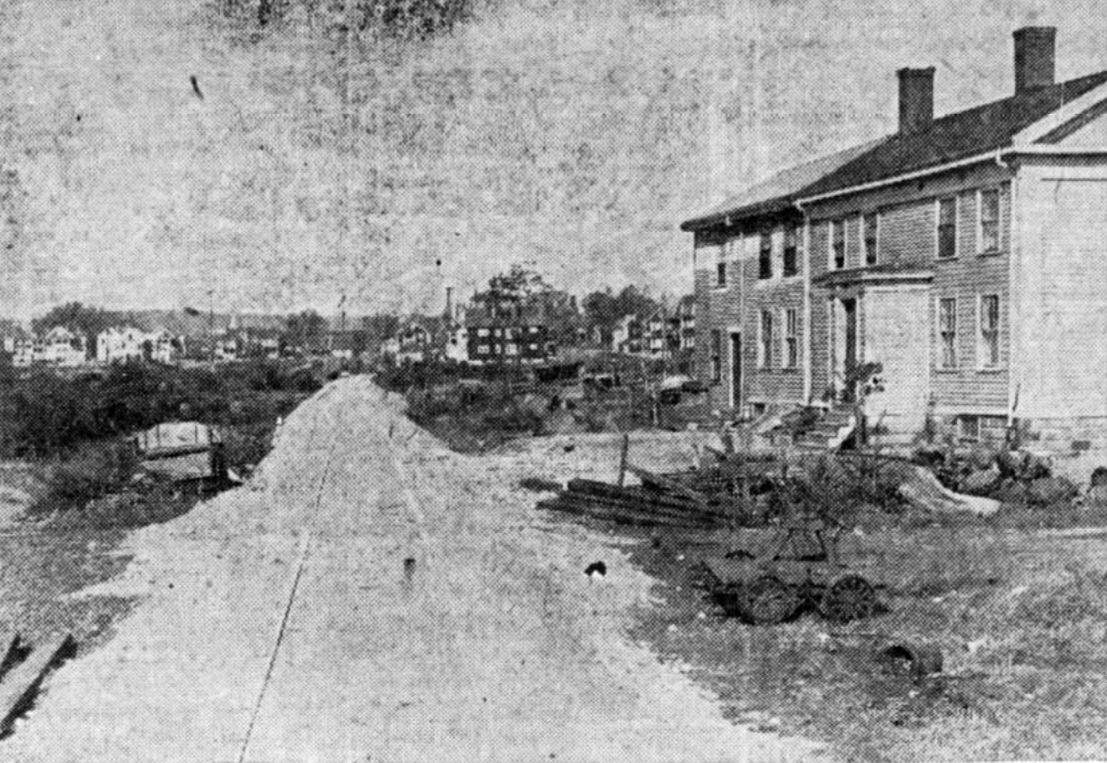
Construction of the Lexington Branch connector in 1926

The Charlestown Branch Railroad opened from Charlestown to Somerville in October 1839. It was extended to Fresh Pond in West Cambridge in 1842 for ice harvesting. Under the control of Alvah Crocker, the line was extended from West Cambridge to Fitchburg as the Fitchburg Railroad in 1843–1845. Stops on the line included West Cambridge (Brick Yards) at Sherman Street, and Hills Crossing at Brighton Street just over the Belmont border to the west. The Lexington and West Cambridge Railroad (Lexington Branch) opened north from West Cambridge in 1846; the Watertown Branch opened south from West Cambridge in 1849.

In 1870, the Boston and Lowell Railroad (B&L) bought the Lexington Branch to prevent it from being a competitor. The B&L constructed a new line from near West Cambridge to Somerville Junction to connect the branch with its mainline. Among the stops on the new line was North Cambridge (North Avenue) at what is now Massachusetts Avenue. The Massachusetts Central Railroad (later Central Massachusetts Railroad) opened in 1881; it paralleled the Fitchburg west of Hills Crossing, then turned slightly north to meet the Lexington Branch at North Cambridge. The B&L was acquired by the Boston and Maine Railroad (B&M) in 1887, followed by the Fitchburg in 1900.

In 1926–27, the B&M built two new sections of track; these allowed the Lexington Branch and the Central Massachusetts Railroad to use the Fitchburg mainline east of West Cambridge. On April 24, 1927, passenger service was rerouted over the rebuilt line; the Fitchburg Cutoff (Hills Crossing to Somerville Junction) became freight-only, with North Cambridge and the two other passenger stations on the line closed. Passenger service ended on the Watertown Branch in 1938. Hills Crossing station closed by the mid-1940s, and West Cambridge by the 1960s. The Massachusetts Bay Transportation Authority (MBTA) was formed in 1964 to support suburban rail service. A number of lightly used branch lines were closed by the MBTA, with the Lexington Branch closing in January 1977.

=== Planning the Red Line ===
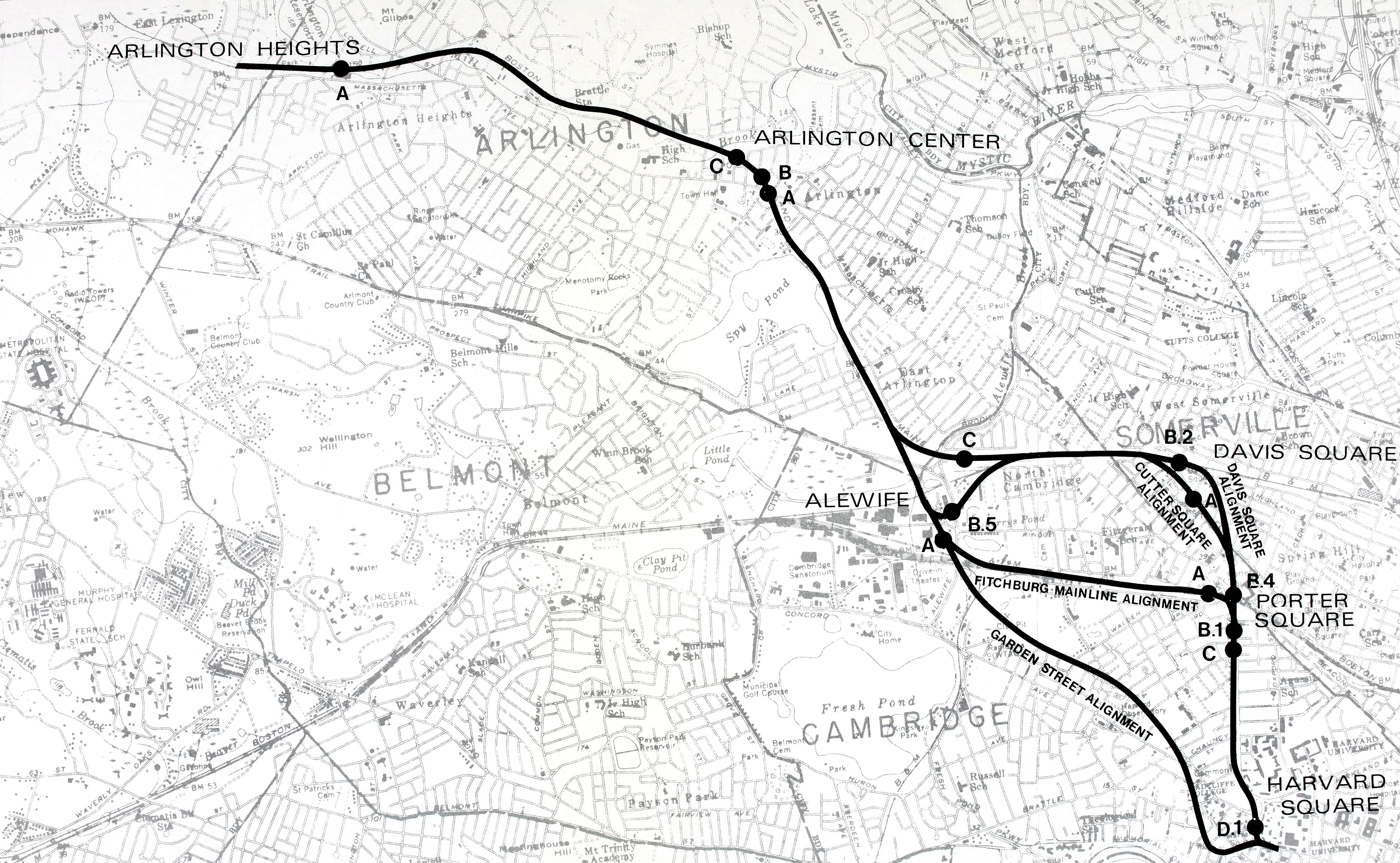
Alignments considered during the planning of the Northwest Extension. The chosen route was via Davis Square, with Alewife station at location B-5. The Arlington portion of the extension was not built.

By 1922, the Boston Elevated Railway believed that Harvard would be the permanent terminus of the Cambridge–Dorchester line; the heavy ridership from the north was expected to be handled by extending rapid transit from Lechmere Square. A 1926 report proposed an extension from Lechmere to North Cambridge via the Southern Division and the Fitchburg Cutoff, with a possible further extension along the Lexington Branch. A northwards extension from Harvard to the North Cambridge/Arlington border was proposed by Cambridge mayor John D. Lynch in 1933 and by then-freshmen state representative Tip O'Neill in 1936, but was not pursued.

The 1945 Coolidge Commission report – the first major transit planning initiative in the region since 1926 – recommended an extension from Harvard to Arlington Heights via East Watertown. The 1947 revision recommended an extension north to Porter Square instead, with branches along the Fitchburg Railroad to Waltham and the Lexington Branch to Lexington. The 1966 Program for Mass Transportation called for an immediate extension to Alewife Brook Parkway (the eastern terminus of the Concord Turnpike) via Porter Square, with possible future extensions to Arlington or Waltham. Original plans called for a subway under Massachusetts Avenue to Porter Square, then a surface route along the Fitchburg Route to Alewife. In the late 1960s, the project was expanded to follow the Lexington Branch to a terminal at Route 128.

By then, highway plans called for the Concord Turnpike (Route 2) to be expanded to eight lanes and extended east along the Fitchburg Line right-of-way to the proposed Inner Belt Expressway. In 1970, then-governor Francis Sargent suspended most highway construction inside Route 128 and created the Boston Transportation Planning Review, which focused on the implementation of new transit routes. This placed increased pressure on a Red Line extension at least as far as a park-and-ride station at Alewife Brook Parkway to handle Route 2 traffic. By the mid-1970s, the project was split into two phases: an all-subway extension to Arlington Heights via Alewife, with a later extension to Route 128.

Three general sites were considered for Alewife station, depending on the alignment of the whole project. Alternatives running via Garden Street or via Porter Square and the Fitchburg mainline were to have a station along the Lexington Branch just north of the Fitchburg mainline. Alternatives using the freight cutoff (via Davis Square or Cotter Square) were to have a station east of Alewife Brook Parkway on the pre-1927 Lexington Branch alignment, or to the south straddling the parkway. The chosen alignment was an all-tunnel route via Porter Square and Davis Square, with the southern station option.

=== Construction ===
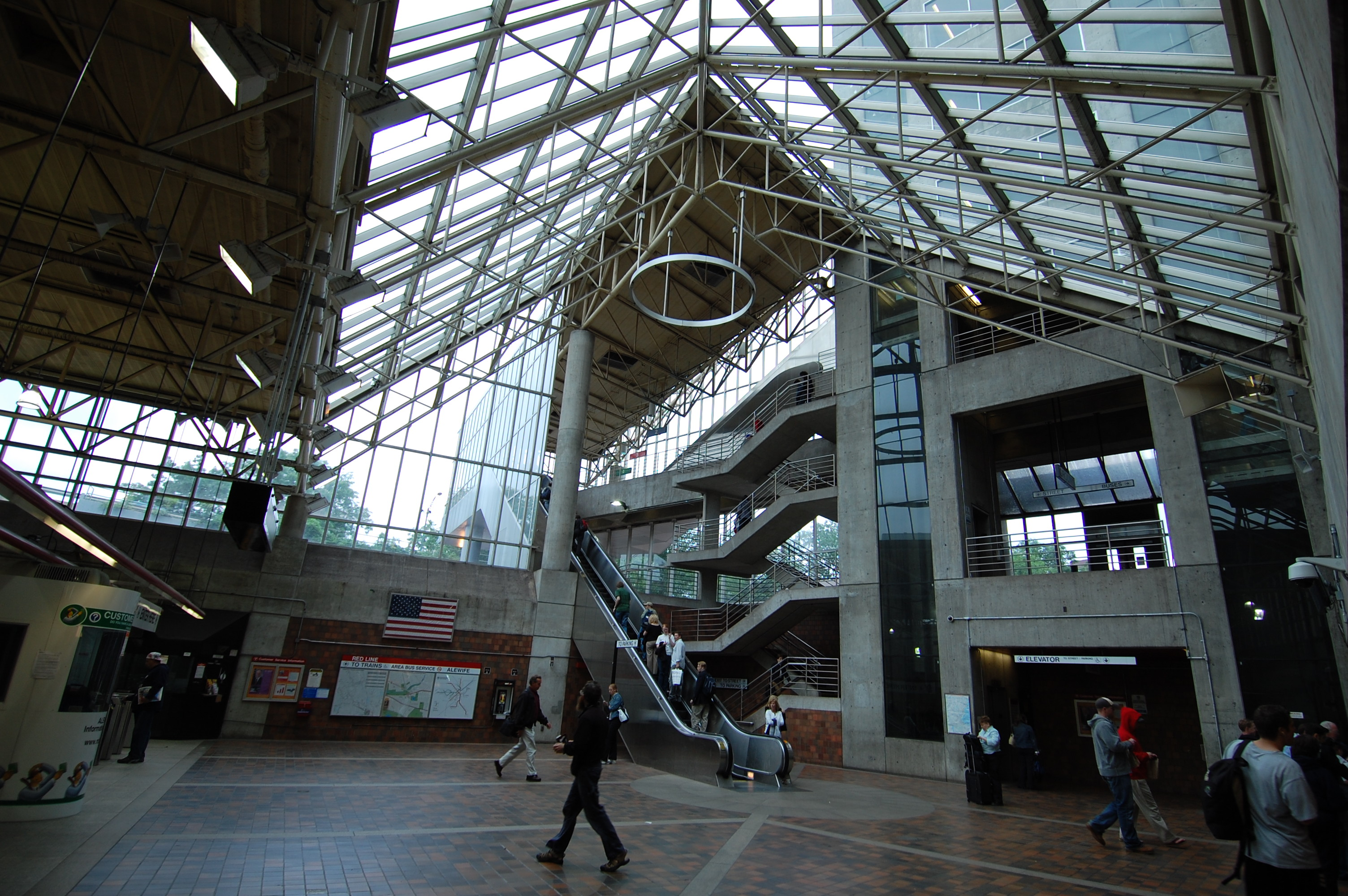
The glass-roofed fare lobby in 2007

Intended primarily as a park-and-ride facility for suburban commuters, Alewife station was built on a former brickyard adjacent to the terminus of the expressway portion of Route 2. Although largely away from residential and commercial areas, the station was intended to be walkable from East Arlington and North Cambridge. The industrial site was chosen to minimize disruptive land takings. The station was designed by Ellenzweig Associates. After Davis and Porter, Alewife was among the first MBTA stations made accessible during initial construction, rather than by renovation. Alewife station was named for the adjacent Alewife Brook (a tributary of the Mystic River) and Alewife Brook Parkway – themselves named for the alewife, a type of fish long associated with the Massachusetts Bay area.

By the time the Red Line Northwest Extension began construction in 1978, opposition in Arlington and reductions in federal funding had caused the MBTA to choose a shorter alternative with Alewife as the terminus. The Fitchburg Cutoff was abandoned in 1979 to allow construction of the extension. The station was constructed by the Perini Corporation. On January 12, 1981, construction worker Ulysses Lemon was killed in a tank truck explosion on Harvey Street in North Cambridge.

After six years of construction, Alewife was the final station on the extension to open. Revenue service began on March 30, 1985. Because the yard facilities were not complete, only Ashmont trains terminated at Alewife at peak hours; peak-hour Braintree trains ran only to Davis until December 26. Initially expected to cost $78 million to construct, the station ultimately cost $84 million. In 1989, the station was awarded a Federal Design Achievement Award by the National Endowment for the Arts, which stated that the "design surrounds all the activity with excitement and beauty... The entire structure is full of art..."

When the station opened, all road access to the garage was from Alewife Brook Parkway, which forced those driving to the station on Route 2 to use a congested rotary north of the station. The design and construction of roadway improvements trailed that of the Red Line project, complicated by political controversy between Arlington, Belmont, and Cambridge over traffic concerns. The state announced a short-term plan in May 1984, under which the rotary would be replaced with a signalized intersection. A direct ramp from eastbound Route 2 to the garage would be built (following a short section of the former Lexington Branch), with a second ramp from the garage under Alewife Brook Parkway (reusing the Fitchburg Cutoff underpass) to the intersection. Environmental review was completed in August 1984. The $3.5 million project was approved by the MBTA board in June 1985; construction began that September and was completed about a year later.

=== Development and trails ===
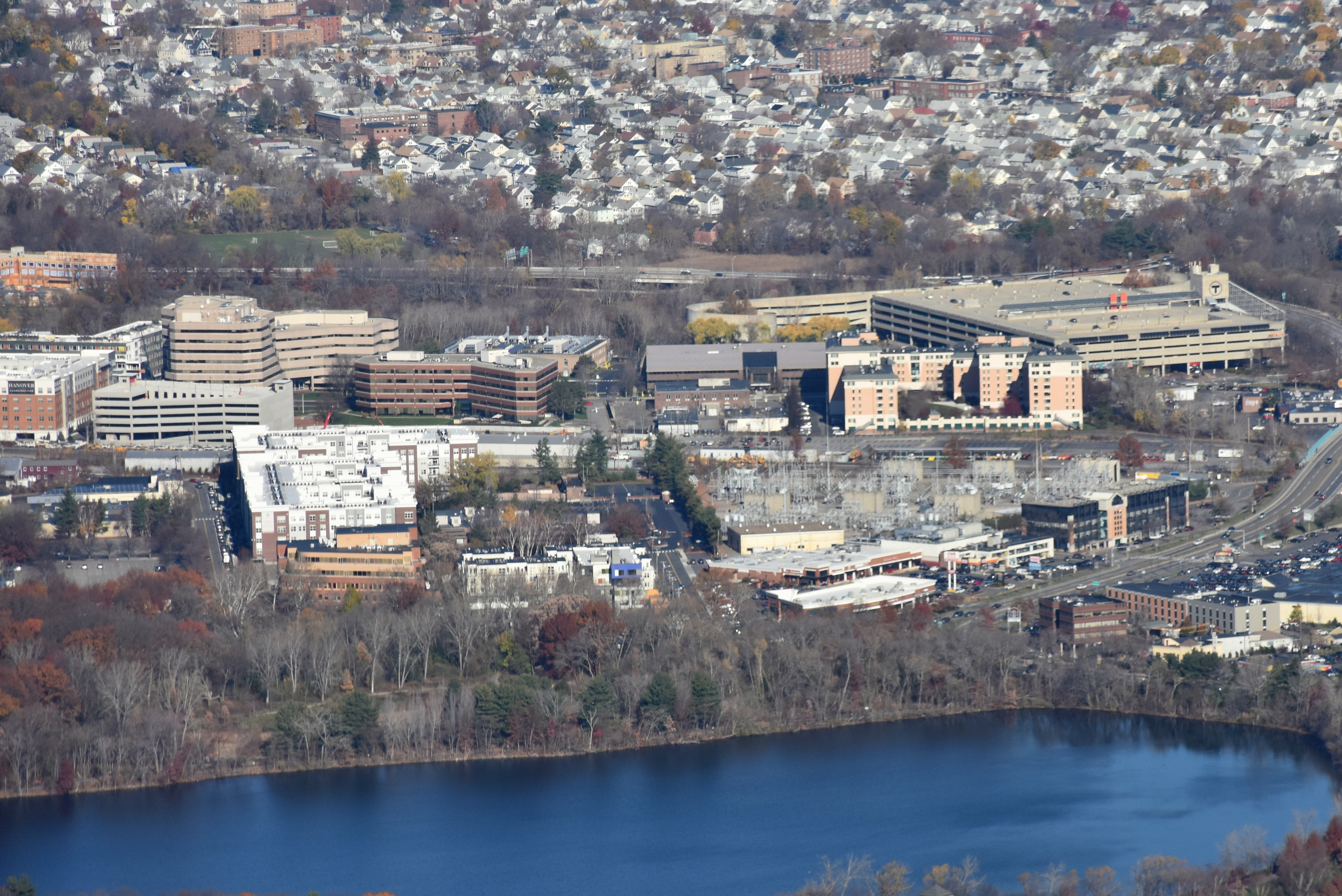
A 2015 aerial view of the Alewife garage (right) and nearby development

Prior to the construction of Alewife station, the surrounding area was known as the "industrial triangle"; the only nearby development was the 1971-built Rindge Towers. Major development had been proposed in the triangle by Arthur D. Little in the 1960s, and by a 1970 city planning study. The construction of Alewife station resulted in what would later be termed transit-oriented development, with commercial developments replacing struggling industrial sites. The first developments around the station were primarily office buildings and high-tech research and development facilities that flourished in Massachusetts in the 1980s. Developers were attracted to the Alewife area by the large plots of available land, the subway connection to Cambridge and Boston, and the proximity to Route 2. An additional development surrounding the east headhouse was considered in the mid-1980s, but was rejected by the community because it would have added 2,000 parking spaces. Residential developments were built in the Alewife triangle beginning in 2003.

The Alewife Linear Park between Alewife and Davis opened in 1985. The Minuteman Bikeway opened in 1992–93 and was extended a short distance to Alewife in 1998, connecting the northwestern suburbs of Arlington, Lexington, and Bedford to Alewife along the former Lexington Branch right-of-way. Alewife became a major junction point between trails: wider sidewalks along Alewife Brook Parkway to the south were added in the 1990s (later connecting to the Fresh Pond Parkway path and the Watertown Greenway), the Alewife Greenway to the north opened in 2012, and the Fitchburg Cutoff Path to the west opened in 2013. The Minuteman quickly became a popular commuter route, necessitating additional bike storage at Alewife. On September 18, 2008, the MBTA opened two 150-bike parking cages on the ground level of the garage. A third cage was added around 2013 as the MBTA built bike cages at a number of stations.

=== Parking garage changes ===
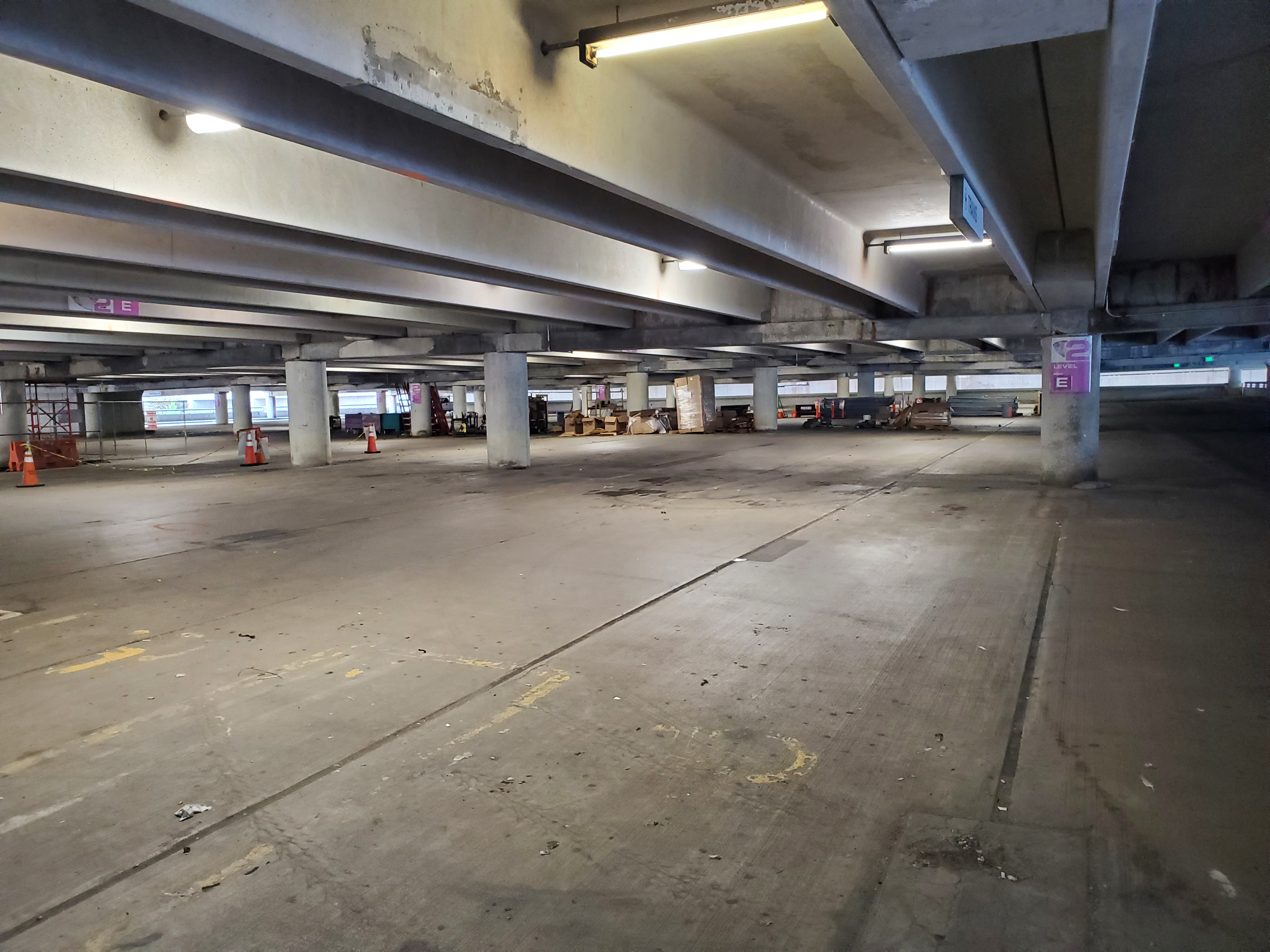
The garage in 2022 during repair work

By the 2000s, the parking garage frequently filled to capacity. In April 2008, the MBTA said that it did not have funds to add two levels to the parking garage, which would cost $30–35 million and add about 1,300 spaces. The structure was originally designed to support two more levels, but whether the condition of the supports and building codes would still allow this expansion was not clear. In August 2018, the MBTA awarded a $5.7 million contract for garage repairs, which were needed even in the absence of funding for expansion. Work began in September 2018, and the main garage entrances were temporarily closed on October 19, 2019. Phased replacement of the garage elevators and the west platform elevator began in mid-2018 and was completed in September 2020.

On February 4, 2023, a driver crashed their car into an edge barrier of the upper level of the parking garage, causing a 10,000-pound (4,500 kg) piece of concrete to fall onto the glass ceiling of the west fare lobby. One passenger suffered minor injuries. The station was temporarily closed for inspection and repairs; shuttle buses operated between Alewife and Davis. The garage reopened on February 8, except for the top level where the crash occurred; the station reopened using only the east headhouse on February 10. The main lobby reopened on March 27, 2023, along with the top floor of the garage.

In April 2024, the MBTA indicated plans to study future scenarios for the station – including the feasibility of removing the garage – in a five-year spending plan. The MBTA issued a request for proposals in August 2024 for a private developer to demolish the garage and construct new buildings in its place. This was to also possibly include redevelopment of about 20 acres (8.1 ha) on the north side of the Fitchburg Line west of Alewife Brook Parkway, which is occupied by a commuter rail maintenance facility that would be moved to Iron Horse Park in Billerica. However, the MBTA cancelled the procurement in January 2026 due to unfavorable market conditions. As of July 2026, the MBTA plans to spend an additional $30 million to extend the garage's lifespan by 10 years.

As of 2026, the MBTA plans to construct an access point near for hi-rail construction vehicles near Alewife from 2027–2029, as the nearest access point is near Charles/MGH station. The tunnel will connect to the Alewife Center access road just north of the Russell Field headhouse. Alewife is also a proposed site for an MBTA Commuter Rail Fitchburg Line station. The 2004 Program for Mass Transportation estimated cost of an infill station at $4.1 million; it was expected to attract 60 daily riders. A 2025 study estimated 800 to 1,169 daily boardings in 2040 with existing frequency, or as high as 2,250 with a doubling of frequency.

== Arts on the Line ==
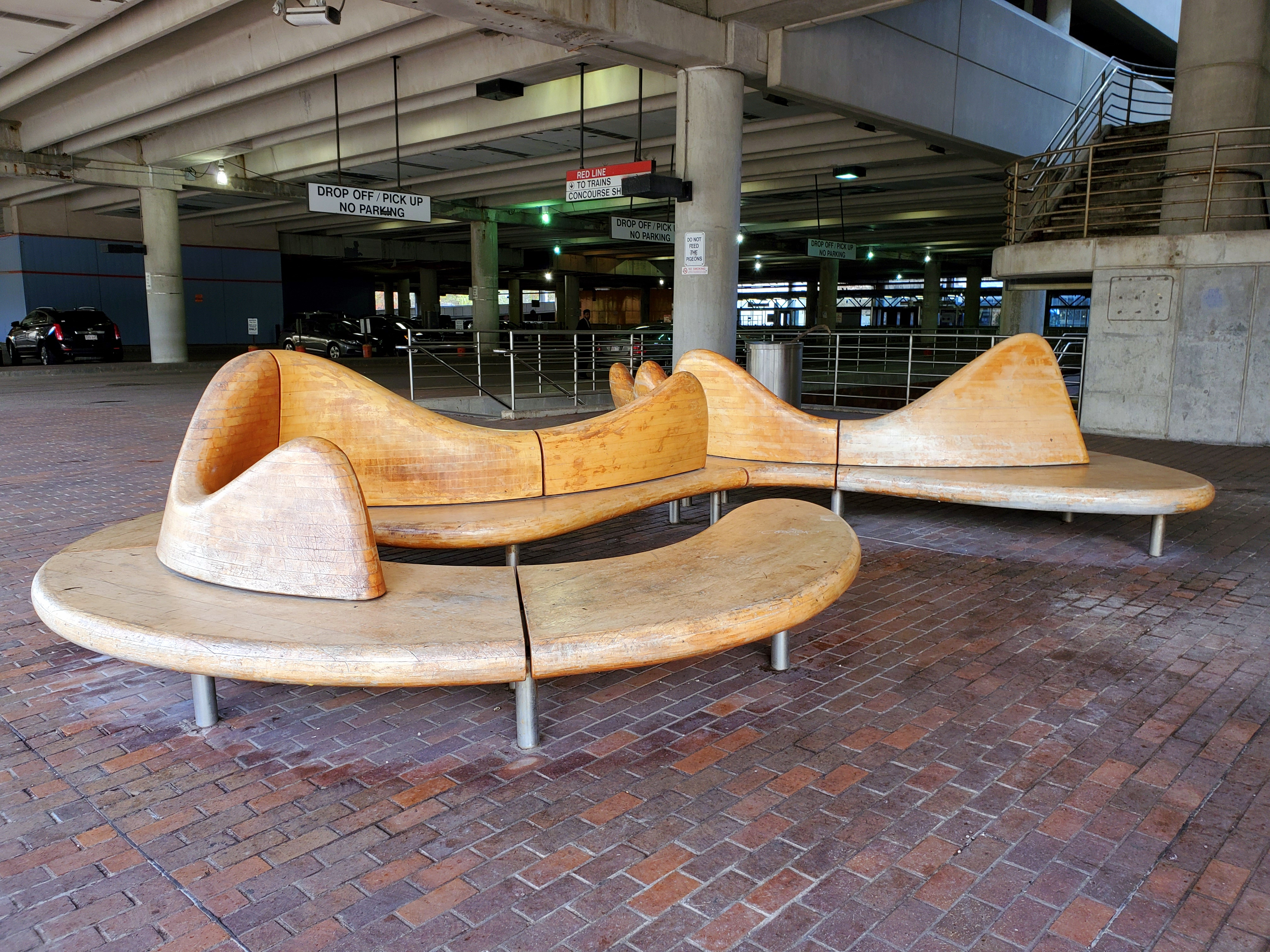
One of William Keyser Jr.'s sculpted benches

In 1978, the MBTA and the Cambridge Arts Council began a program entitled Arts on the Line to add public art to new and renovated subway stations. For the Red Line Northwest Extension, 0.5% of the cost of the project was reserved for artworks. They were largely constructed of durable materials like stone and metal, designed to withstand vandalism as well as normal wear and tear for 75 years.

Six of the original twenty artworks are located at Alewife station:

- Untitled by Richard Fleischner – A 3-acre (1.2 ha) environmental work containing an artificial pond, large granite blocks, decorative pavers, and trees; located south of the garage
- Alewife Wayside by David Davison – 200 feet (61 m) of abstractly painted blue porcelain tiles on the wall of the south pedestrian ramp to the garage
- Alewife Cows by Joel Janowitz – A mural of a false exit to the bus platform with cows grazing in a pasture outside.
- Untitled by William Keyser Jr. – Two maple sculptural benches on the ground level of the garage
- The End of the Red Line by Alejandro and Moira Siña – 1000 neon art tubes suspended from the ceiling over the north Red Line track
- Untitled by Nancy Webb – 100 6-inch-square (15 cm) bronze tiles with low relief images of plants and animals found in the Alewife Brook Reservation, scattered throughout the station lobby. The tiles depict "alewives (fish), frogs, song sparrows, dandelions, roses, snakes, toads, herons, and grasshoppers".

Two additional works at the station were not part of the Arts on the Line program:

- Sculpture as a Sign by Toshihiro Katayama – a 14-foot-diameter (4.3 m), 3-foot-thick (0.91 m) large stainless steel disk, designed in 1985, that forms the MBTA's "T" logo outside the south end of the garage.
- The Alewife Reservation Mural Project by David Fichter – an 8-by-80-foot (2.4 m × 24.4 m) mural depicting plants and animals found in the Alewife Brook Reservation, located on the south end of the garage. Painted by Fitcher and twelve students (most from Cambridge Rindge and Latin School) in 2004, it was funded by the Friends of Alewife Reservation and the Cambridge Arts Council.
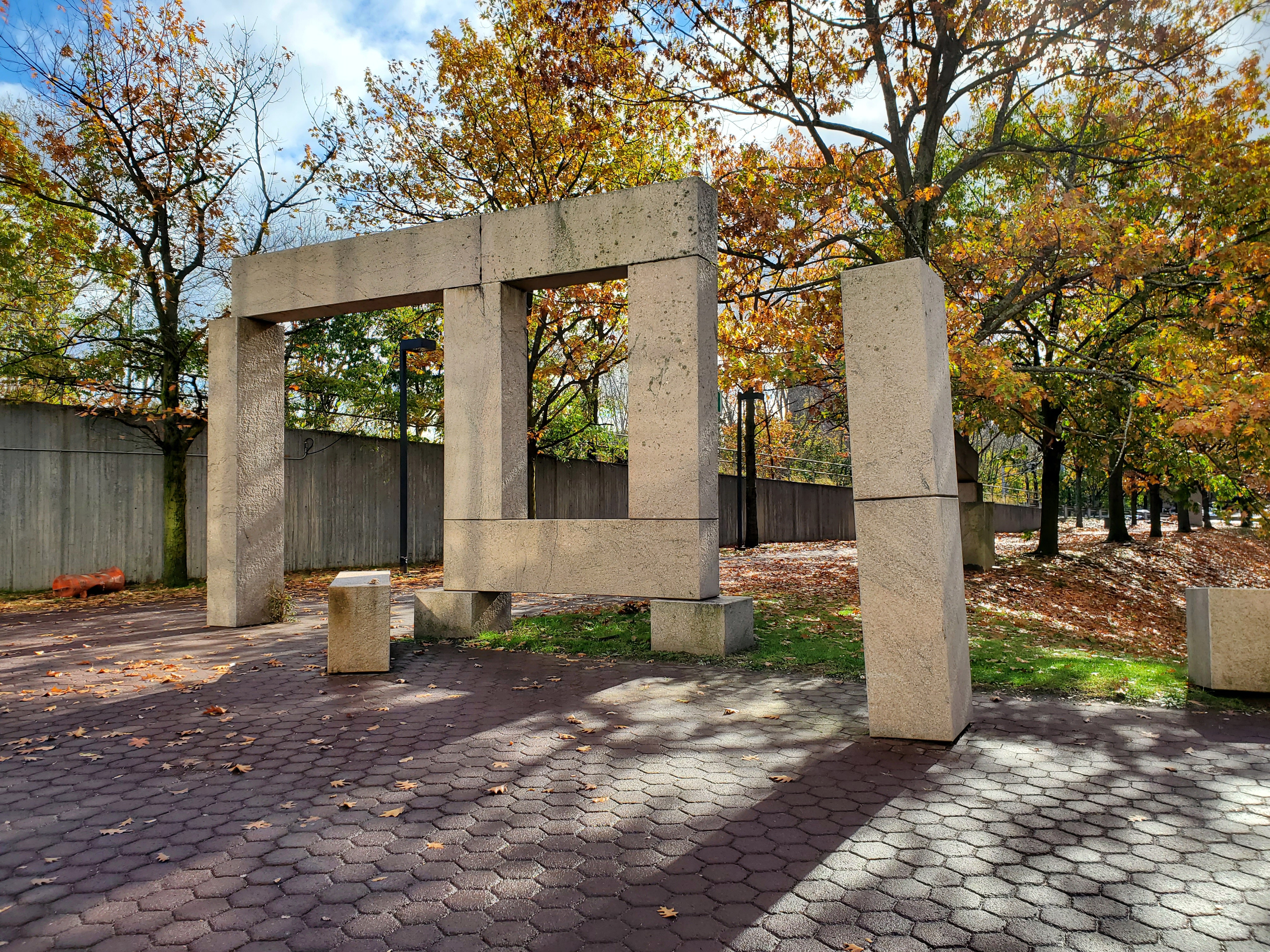
Untitled (Richard Fleischner)

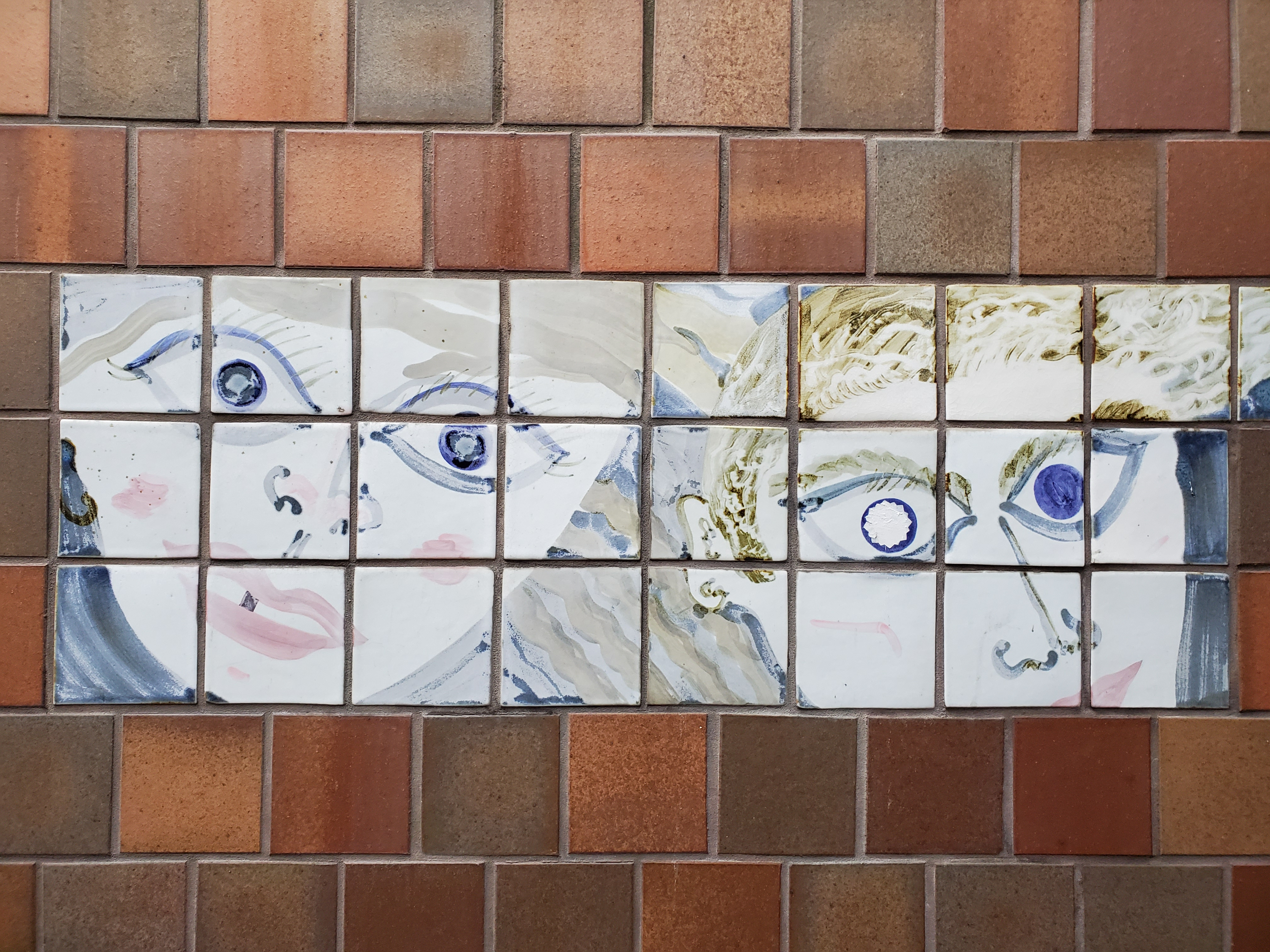
Alewife Wayside

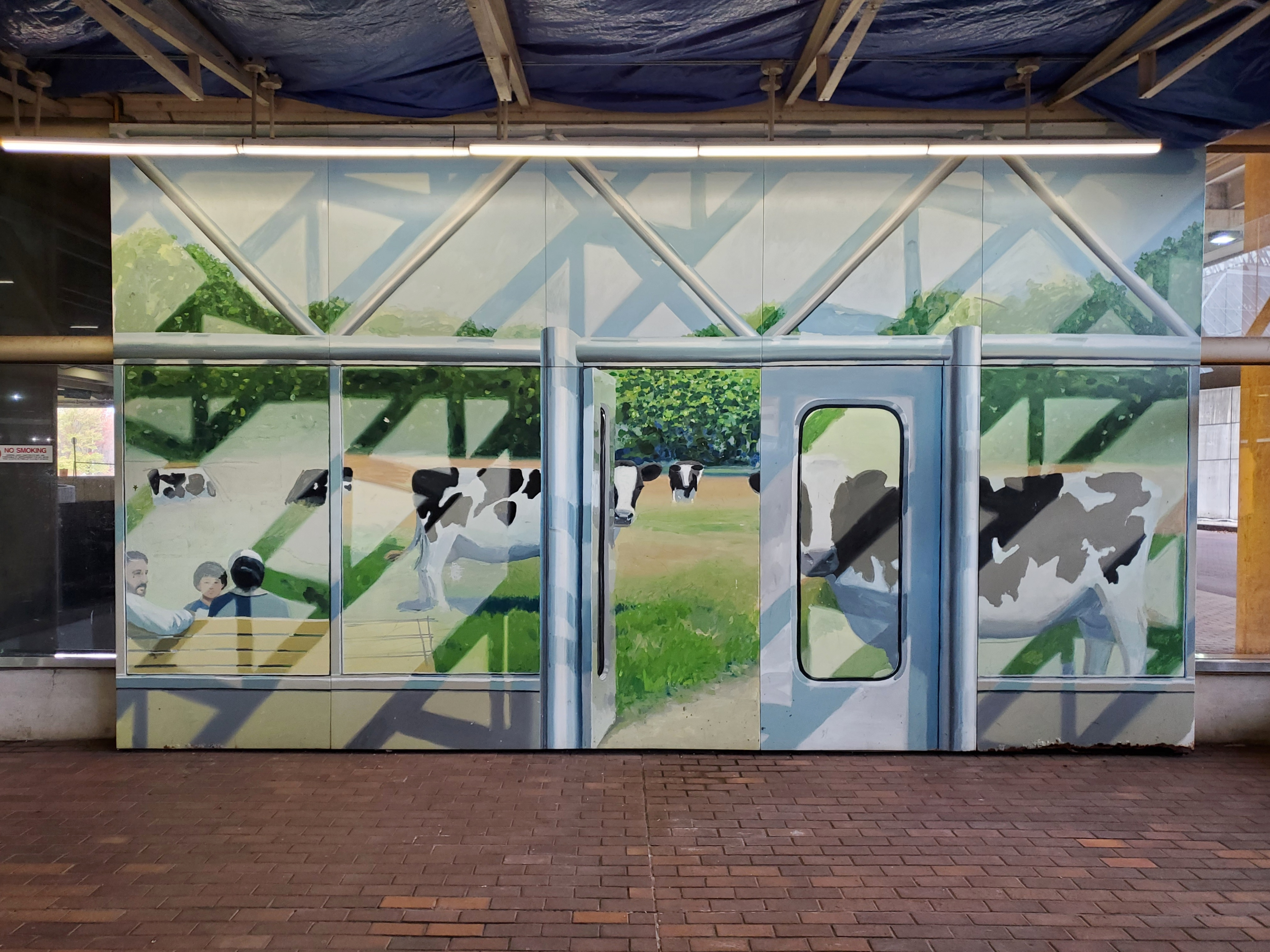
Alewife Cows

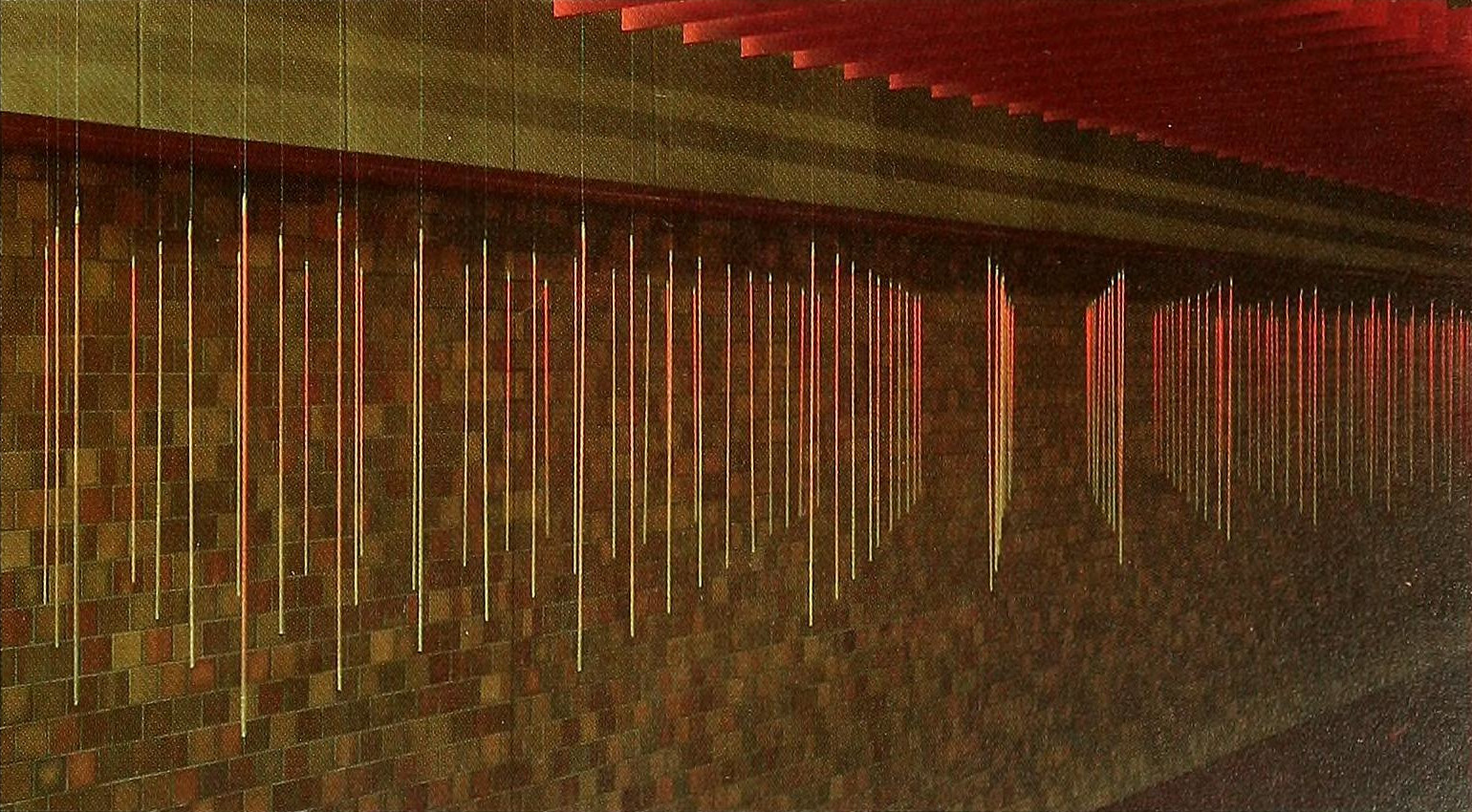
The End of the Red Line

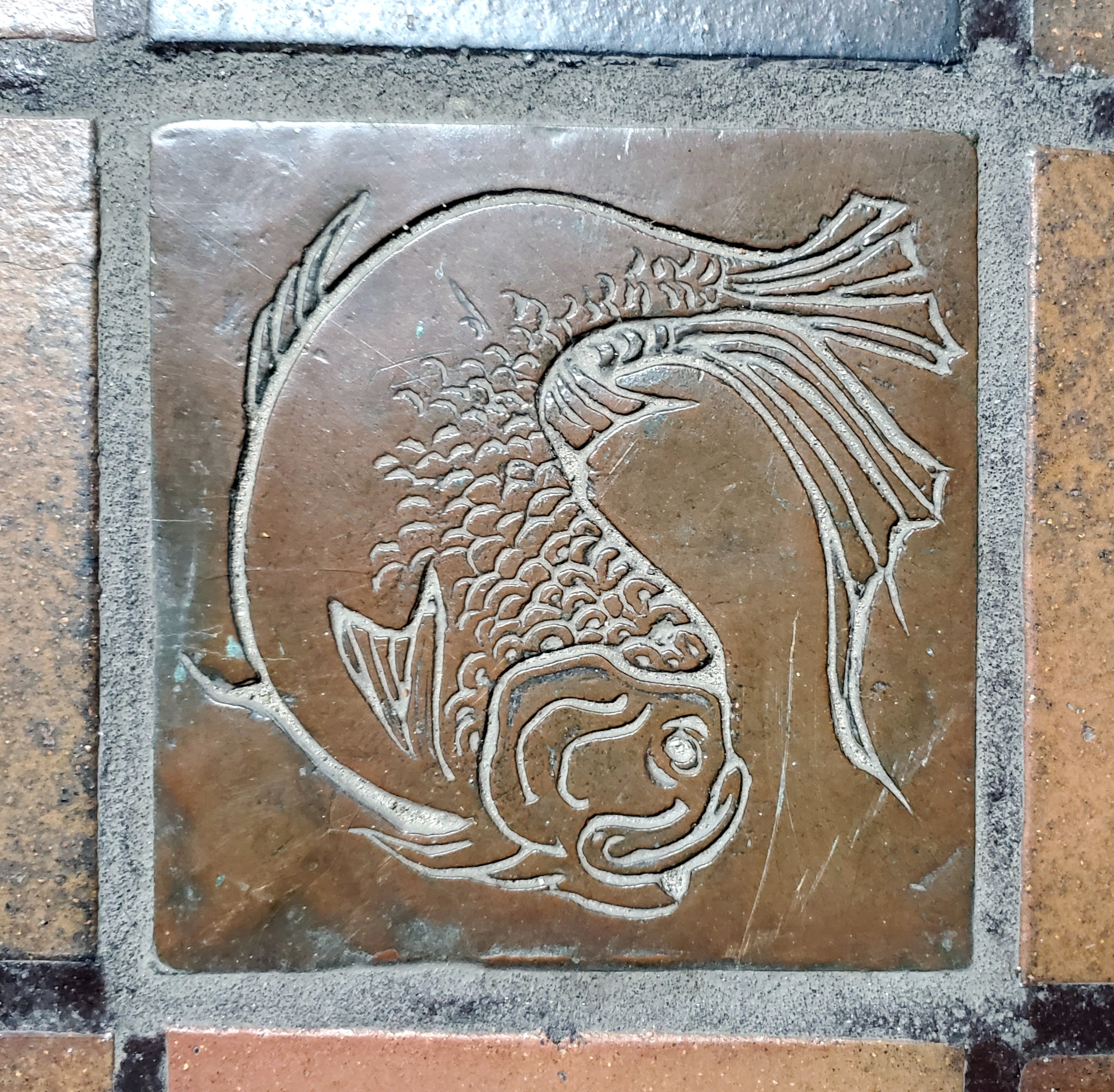
Untitled (Nancy Webb)

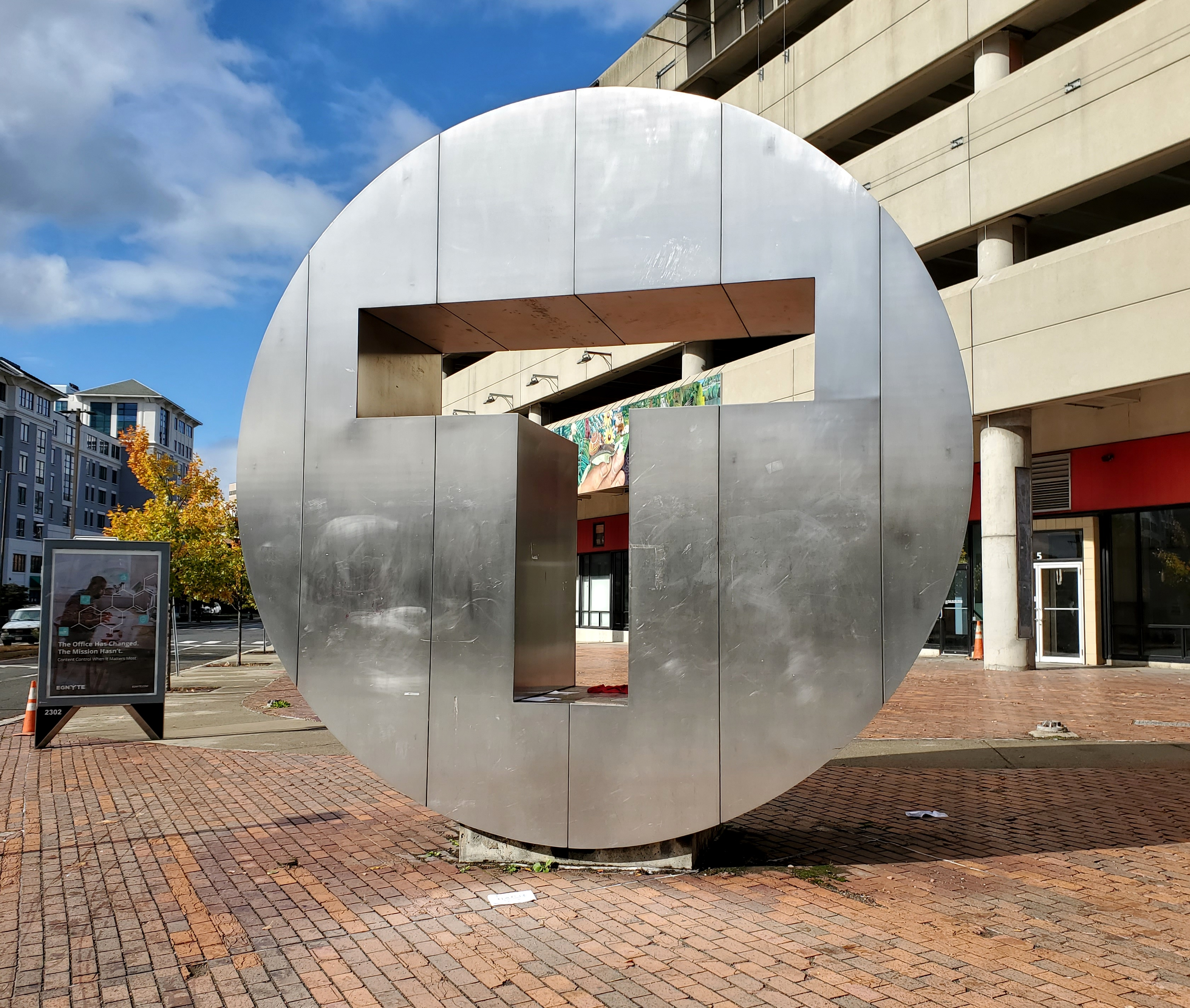
Sculpture as a Sign
