= Davis station (MBTA) =

Rapid transit station in Somerville, Massachusetts, US

Davis
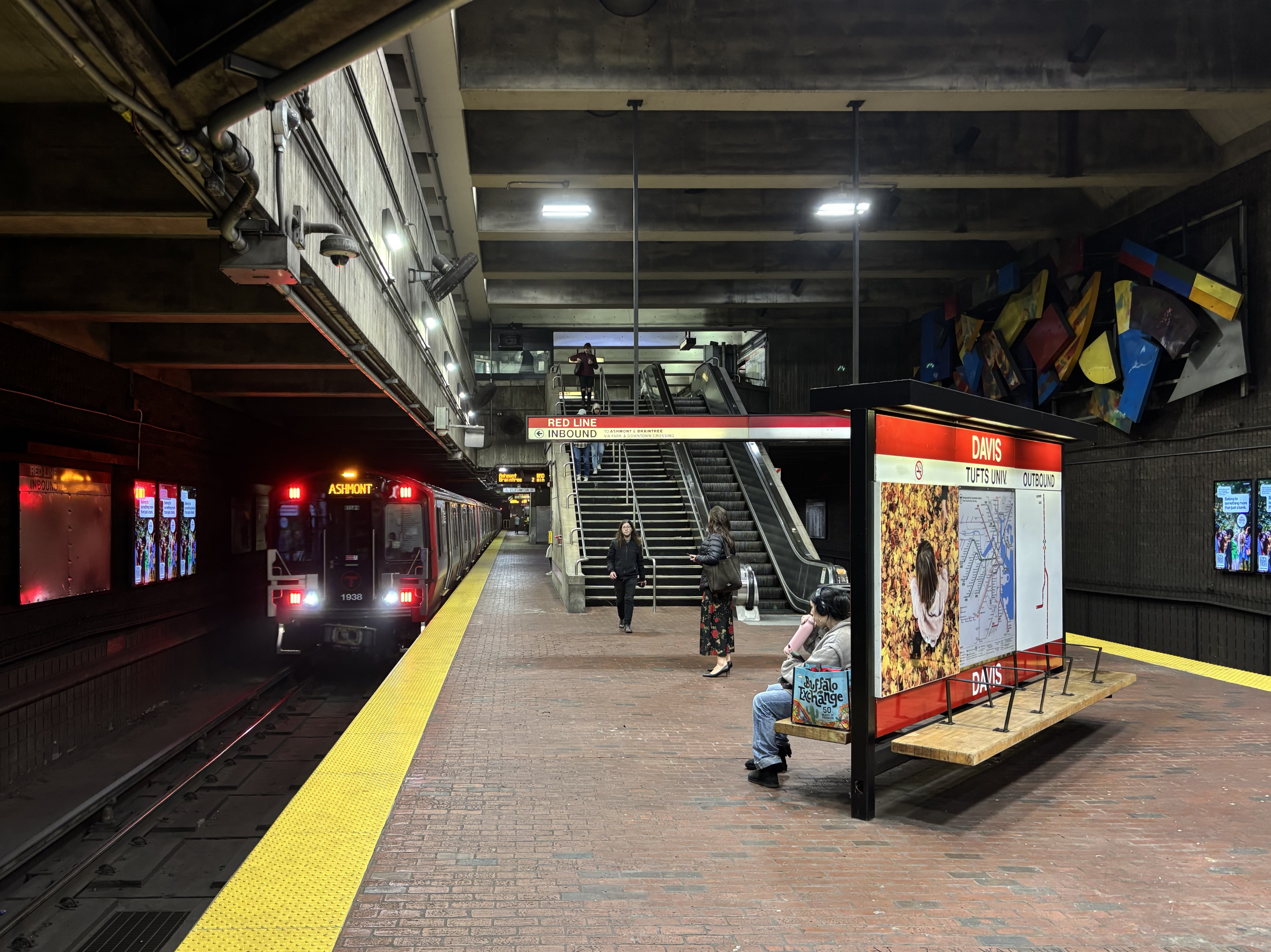
- A southbound train entering Davis station in November 2025

General information
- Location: College Avenue and Elm Street; Somerville, Massachusetts
- Coordinates: 42.3969°N 71.1225°W
- Line: Red Line Northwest Extension
- Platforms: 1 island platform
- Tracks: 2
- Connections: MBTA bus: 87, 88, 89, 90, 94, 96

Construction
- Structure type: Underground
- Cycle facilities: 165 spaces in "Pedal and Park" bicycle cage
- Accessible: yes

History
- Opened: 1870 (former station); December 8, 1984 (MBTA)
- Closed: April 24, 1927 (former station)
- Former names: West Somerville

Passengers
- FY2019: 11,442 (weekday average boardings)

Services
Preceding station	MBTA	Following station
Alewife Terminus	Red Line	Porter toward Ashmont or Braintree
Location

Davis station is an underground Massachusetts Bay Transportation Authority (MBTA) Red Line rapid transit station located at Davis Square in Somerville, Massachusetts. The accessible station has a single island platform for the Red Line, as well as a dedicated busway on the surface. It opened in 1984 as part of the Red Line Northwest Extension project.

== Station design ==
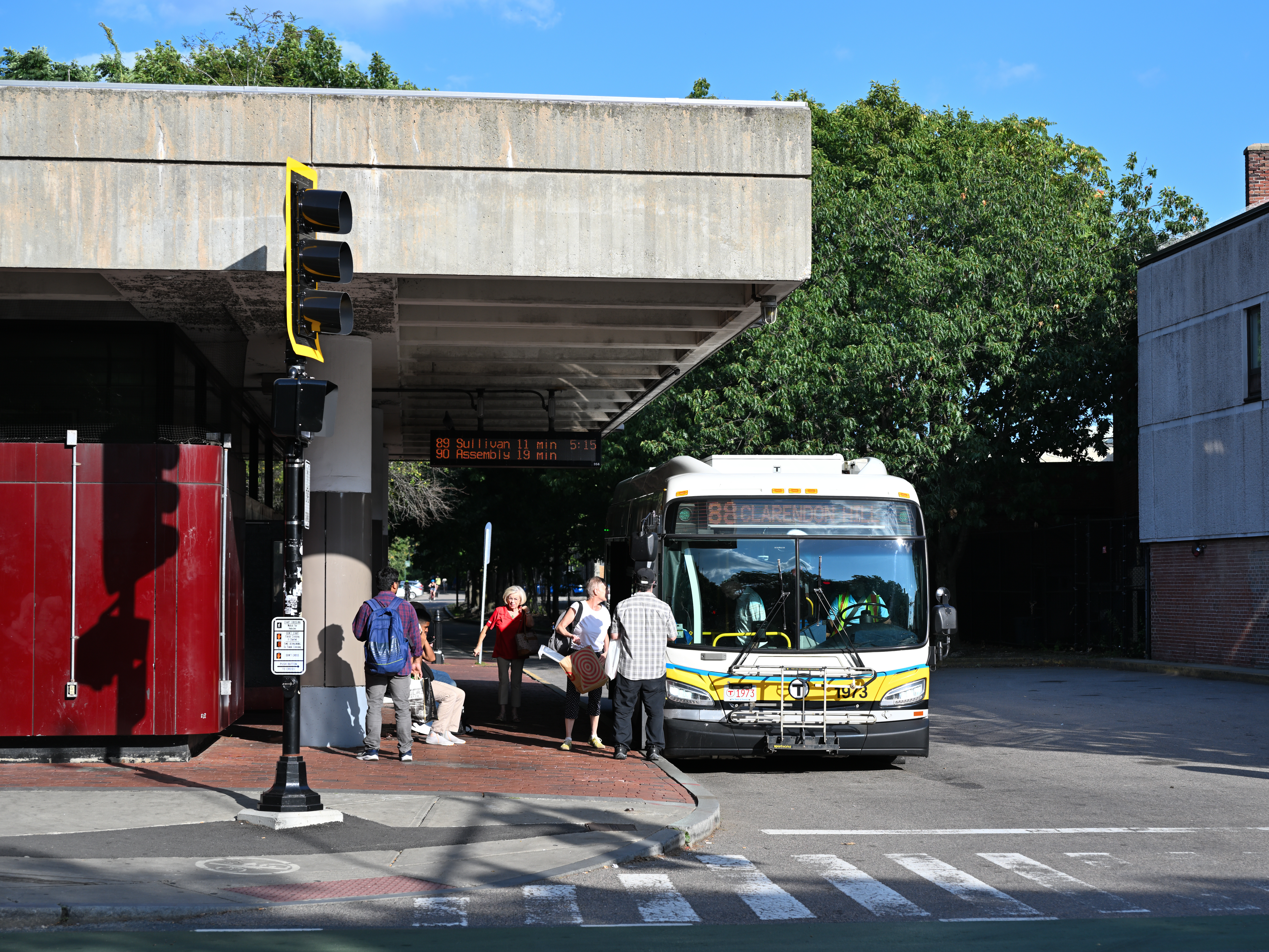
The east headhouse and busway

The station has a single underground island platform, oriented approximately east-west under Davis Square. It has two brutalist concrete headhouses – at College Avenue on the east side of the square, and at Holland Street on the west side. A fare mezzanine running the length of the station connects the two headhouses and the platform. A skylight in the plaza provides natural light to the mezzanine. The station is accessible, with elevators connecting the mezzanine to the platform and the College Avenue headhouse.

An off-street busway served by six MBTA bus routes – 87, 88, 89, 90, 94, and 96 – is located next to the east headhouse. Inbound buses on routes that do not terminate at Davis do not use the busway; they instead stop on surface streets near the station entrances. A "Pedal and Park" bicycle cage is located east of the east headhouse.

== History ==
=== Railroad station ===
The first transit service to what would become Davis Square (Note: The junction of Elm Street, Highland Avenue, and Holland Street would not be designed as Davis Square until 1883.) was a horsecar line to Union Square, Somerville via Elm Street and Somerville Avenue, which was opened by the Somerville Horse Railroad (later part of the Cambridge Railroad) in 1858 and extended to Lechmere Square in 1864. Its carhouse was located on Dover Street just west of Elm Street. A second route to Lechmere Square was opened in 1888 by successor West End Street Railway and electrified on July 14, 1894; the Elm Street route was electrified on November 23, 1895. Clarendon Hill Carhouse opened on August 8, 1896, replacing the Dover Street facility. The two routes were converted to trolleybus on November 8, 1941, and to bus on March 31, 1963; the Elm Street line is now route 87 and the Highland Avenue line route 88.

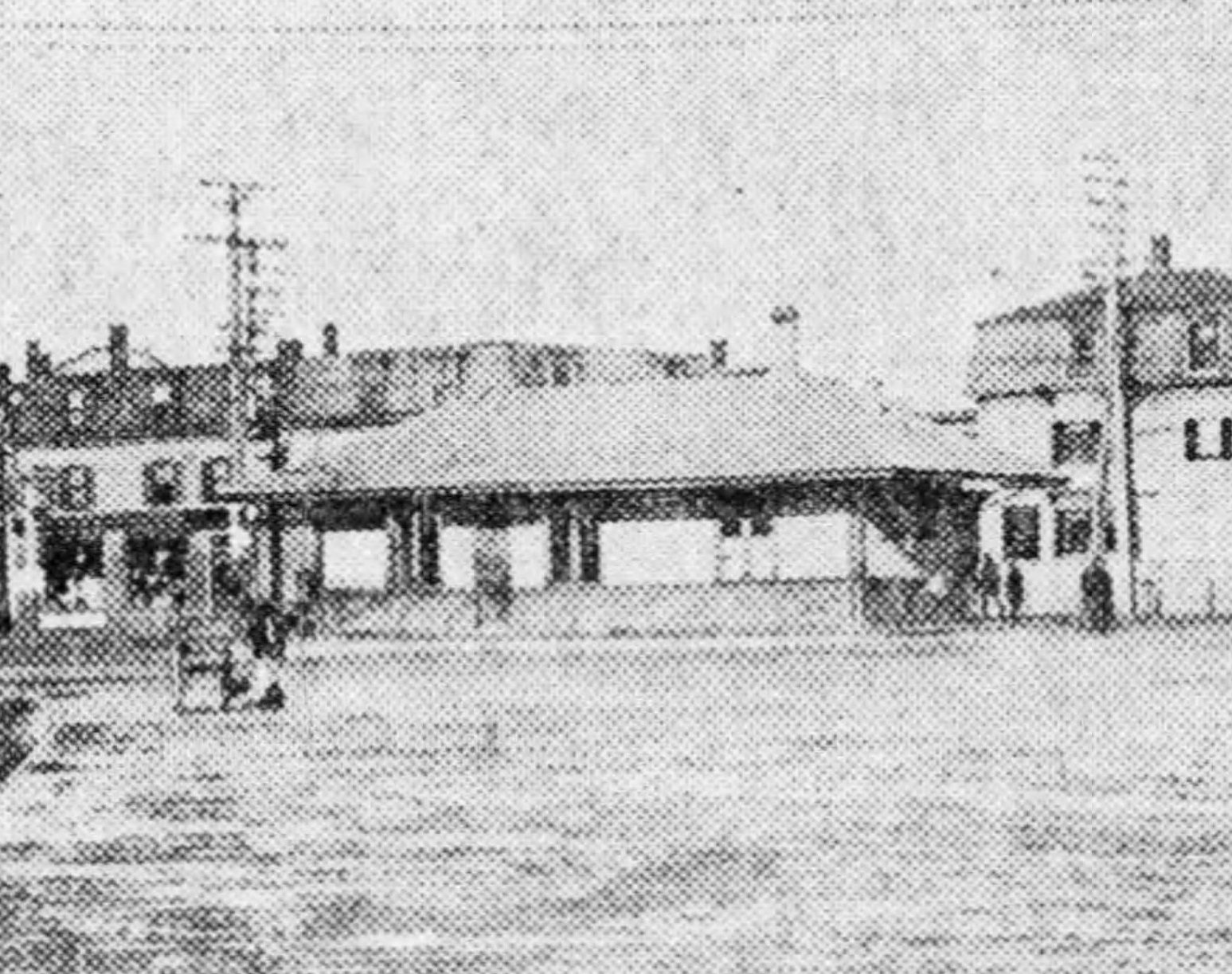
West Somerville station in 1903

When opened in 1846, the Lexington Branch split from the Fitchburg Railroad at West Cambridge. In 1870, the Boston and Lowell Railroad (B&L) bought the Lexington Branch to prevent it from becoming a competitor. The B&L built a cutoff from Lake Street to Somerville Junction, which opened on December 1, 1870. Among the stations on the line was Elm Street, located in the triangle between Elm Street (now College Avenue) and Holland Street. In January 1876, William Robinson installed one of the first test applications of his track circuit signaling system on the line between Elm Street and North Avenue. On June 14, 1876, Pedro II of Brazil travelled to Elm Street station to view the system.

The Massachusetts Central Railroad began service on October 1, 1881; it used most of the 1870-built cutoff to reach Boston. Operations were suspended from 1882 to 1884; it was leased by the B&L in 1886. The station was renamed to West Somerville in the mid-1880s. The B&L was acquired by the Boston and Maine Railroad (B&M) in 1887. The streetcar and railroad service stimulated substantial development in the 1870s and 1880s as Davis Square quickly grew into an active commercial center. A boom in residential construction followed in the 1890s.

The city proposed to eliminate the grade crossings on the line, including the pair of College Avenue and Holland Street at Davis Square, in the early 1900s. Most grade crossings on the Fitchburg Railroad mainline were eliminated over the next decade, but those on the Lexington Branch cutoff were not. On January 31, 1915, the West Somerville station building was moved west of Holland Street at the request of the mayor to improve conditions in the square. By this time, the station was often called Davis Square, though its official name remained West Somerville. The B&M discontinued ticket and baggage service at the station in 1924.

In 1926–27, as part of construction of a new centralized freight yard in Somerville, the B&M built two new sections of track which allowed the Lexington Branch and the Central Massachusetts Railroad to use the Fitchburg mainline east of Alewife Brook Parkway. On April 24, 1927, passenger service was rerouted over the rebuilt line; North Cambridge, West Somerville, and Somervile Highlands stations were closed. Although residents were opposed to the closures, the B&M wished to avoid the grade crossings on the line, which had seen 70 crashes in the past six years. The old line through Davis Square became the freight-only Fitchburg Cutoff; it was rebuilt with heavier rails to handle heavy freights headed to and from the new Somerville freight yard. The abandoned station was damaged by fire on June 12, 1929, and again during a riot on July 4, 1938. It is no longer extant. In 1935, the city requested that the line be grade-separated as part of a Works Progress Administration-funded grade crossing elimination program. However, the grade crossings were not eliminated; crashes and stalled freight trains continued to be a problem in the square.

=== Red Line station ===
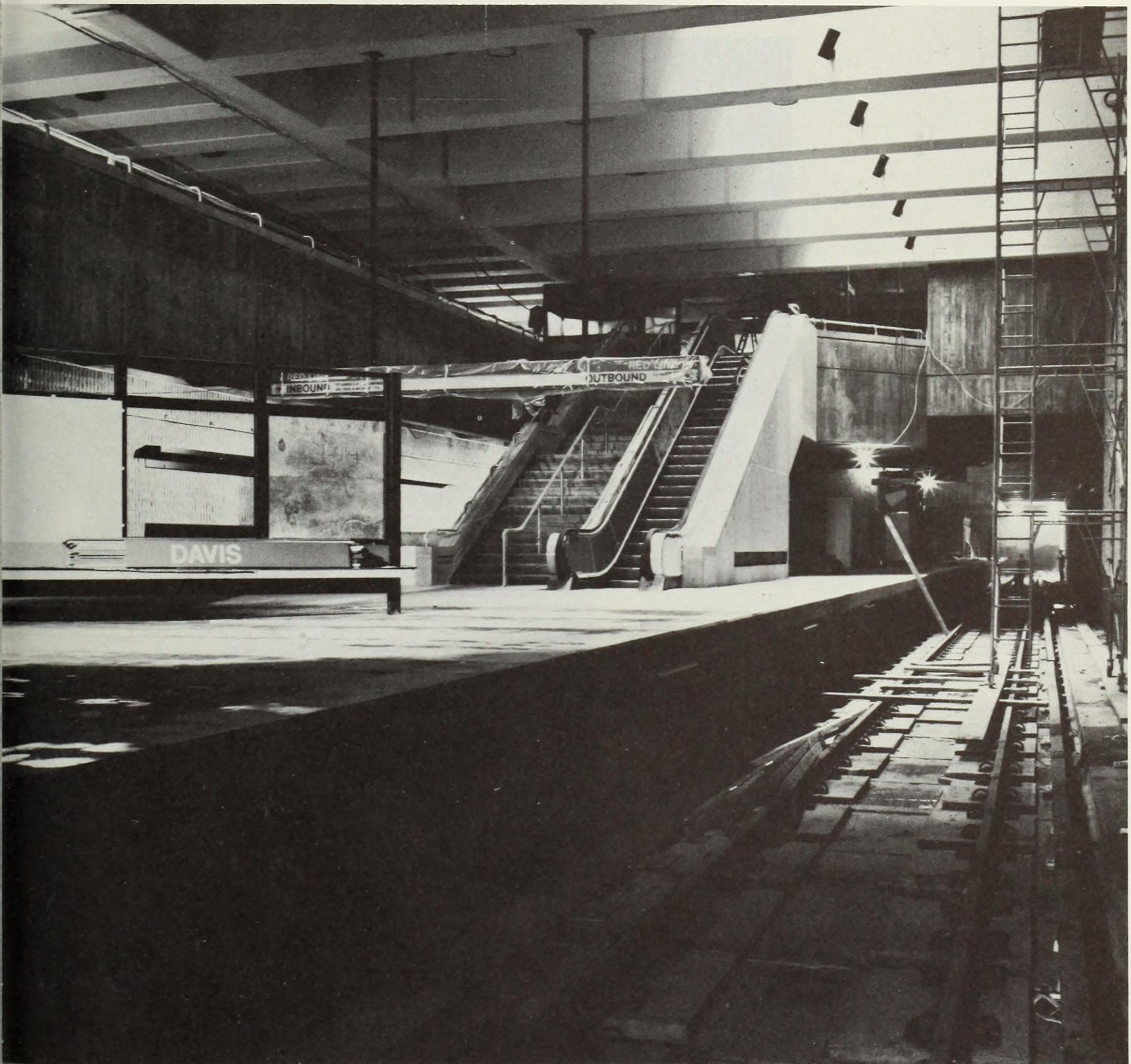
Davis station under construction in 1983

In the 1970s, local officials and citizen groups successfully petitioned the Massachusetts Bay Transportation Authority to create a Red Line subway stop in Somerville at Davis Square. Freight service over the Fitchburg Cutoff through Davis Square, which had been reduced in the mid-1970s, ended entirely in April 1980. Davis station opened on December 8, 1984, spurring major development and revitalization of the area.

Davis and Porter were the first MBTA subway stations made accessible during initial construction, rather than by renovation. In June 1993, Margaret McCarthy, a blind woman, fell off the platform and was killed by electrocution by the third rail. McCarthy was an advocate for adding tactile warning strips to the edges of station platforms; her death prompted the MBTA to finally install warning strips at all subway stations.

A $6.6 million design contract was awarded in April 2020 for accessibility improvements at Davis and Broadway. Initial plans called for two new surface elevators and two new platform elevators, and to add new walkways on the mezzanine level to connect the elevators. Design reached 30% in 2021; by that time, the project scope had been changed to add replacement of two existing elevators, and to only add one new platform elevator. Design work reached 75% completion in 2022 and was nearly complete by November 2023.

== Arts on the Line ==
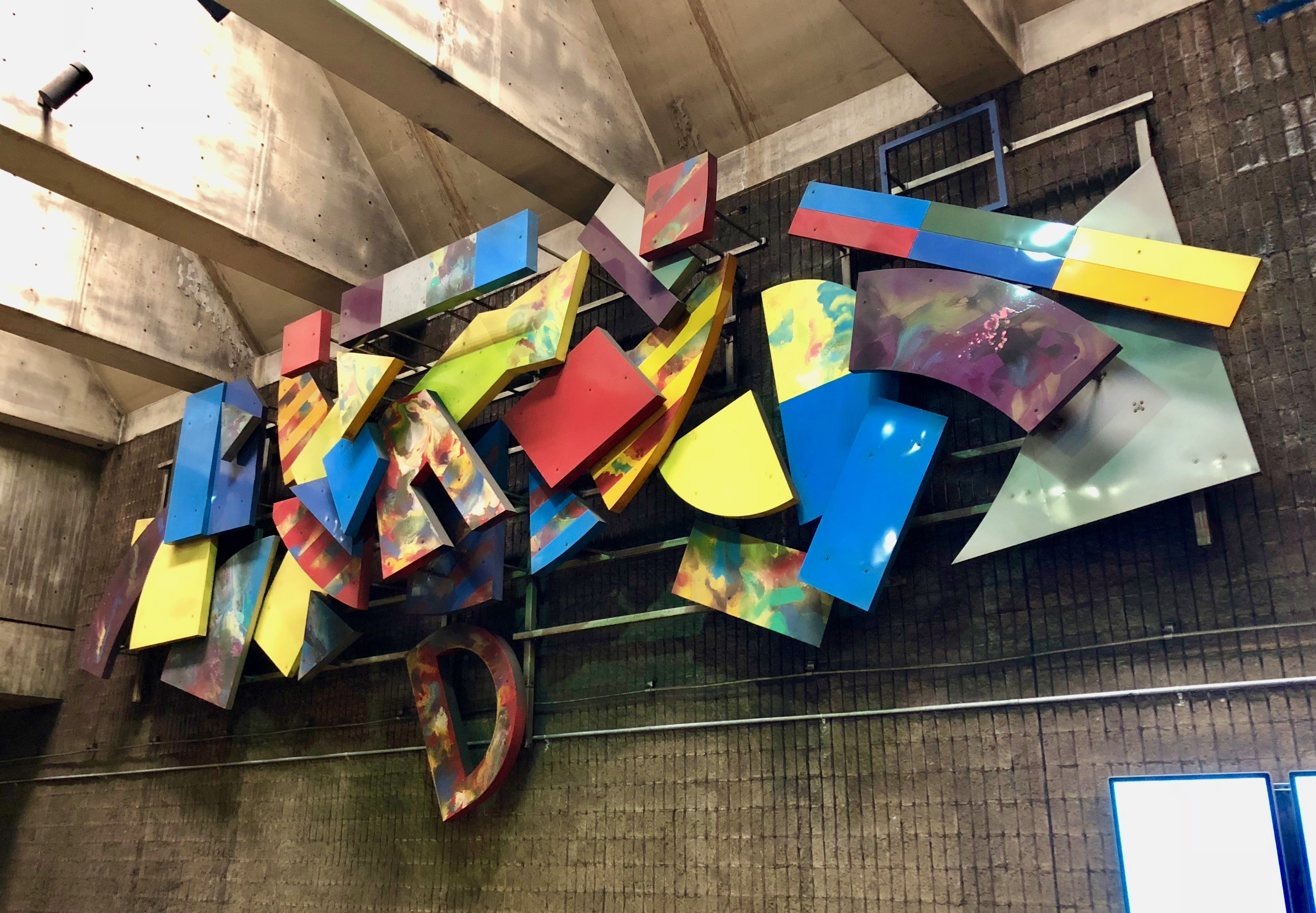
Sculpture with a D seen in 2018

As a part of the Red Line Northwest Extension, Davis was included as one of the stations involved in the Arts on the Line program. Arts on the Line was devised to bring art into the MBTA's subway stations in the late 1970s and early 1980s. It was the first program of its kind in the United States and became the model for similar drives for art across the country.

Four of the original twenty artworks are located at Davis station. These works are:

- Ten Figures by James Tyler – Life-size people created out of cement, placed in areas around Davis Square
- Children's Tile Mural by Jack Gregory and Joan Wye – Many tiles created by children placed on the brick wall of the station mezzanine. In 2009, a group of local artists attempted to find as many of the tile-makers as possible. The schoolchildren are now 35–45 years old.
- Poetry by various poets – Lines of poems are embedded into bricks on the station platform floor
- Sculpture with a D by Sam Gilliam – A large scale, brightly colored, abstract work

Nine panels of community art were added on the platform level in May 2008.
