= William Wallace Benjamin =

American produce wholesaler (1851–1918)

- Born: 1851; Lincoln, Massachusetts, United States
- Died: June 2, 1917 (aged 65–66); Boston, Massachusetts
- Occupation: Businessman
- Known for: Publicity stunts promoting his business, W.W. Benjamin & Co
- Spouse: Sarah Russell Welles (m. 1875)
- Children: 6

William Wallace Benjamin (1851–1918) was an American wholesale produce dealer based in Boston, Massachusetts. He was well known for his publicity stunts promoting his business, W.W. Benjamin & Co. In 1909, he had 140 containing 6,300 cabbages hauled from the Boston docks to his produce house at 26 Mercantile Street. At the time, The Boston Globe billed it as "the largest load of the vegetable ever hauled through [the] streets of Boston".

He was married to Sarah Russell Welles, Granddaughter of Gideon Welles, Secretary of the Navy, and the cousin of President Franklin Pierce.

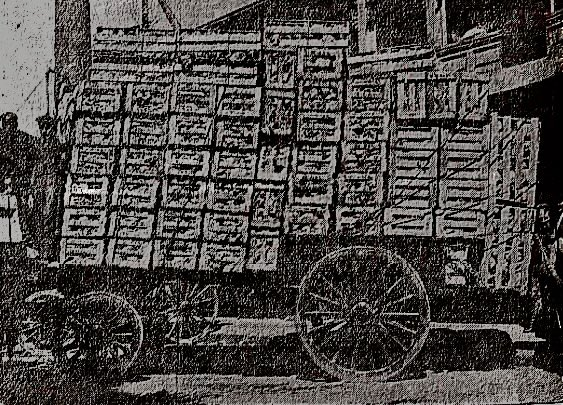
Cabbage stunt in Boston, 1909

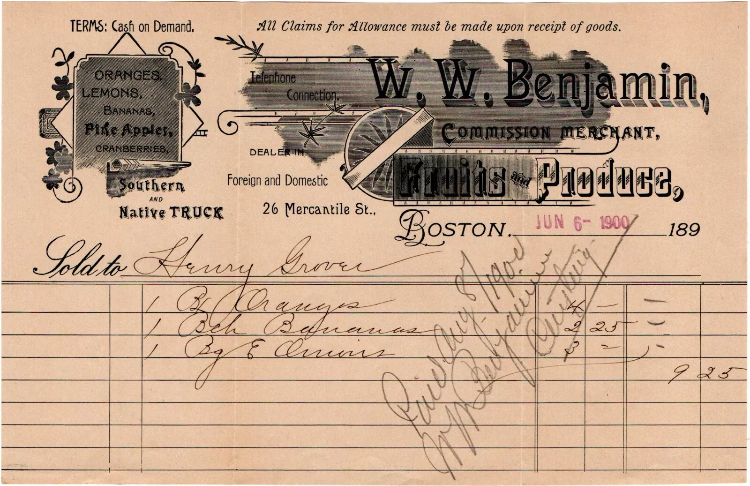
William Wallace Benjamin Signed Billhead From 1900

== Early life ==
William Wallace Benjamin was born in 1851 to farmer William Oliver Benjamin, (1821-1899) and seamstress Susan Caroline Watts, (1826-1909,) in Lincoln, Massachusetts. He was one of 5 children. His father was a descendant of Prominent early colonial settler, John Benjamin and his wife, Abigail Eddy, who came to Massachusetts in 1632 on the ship Lyon.

His mother, Susan was the child of William Watts, (1804-1835) and Susan Bradford Davis, (1803-1865.) Susan was the Great Great Great Granddaughter of William Bradford, John Howland, John Alden, and William Brewster. She was also a descendant of Thomas and Anne Putnam of the Salem Witch Trials.

== Career ==
As of 1893, Benjamin was trading in both "foreign and domestic fruits", including oranges, berries, grapes, peaches, sweet potatoes and other general produce. In 1895, he attracted public attention when he arranged to have 4,000 empty flour barrels loaded onto a large coal barge.

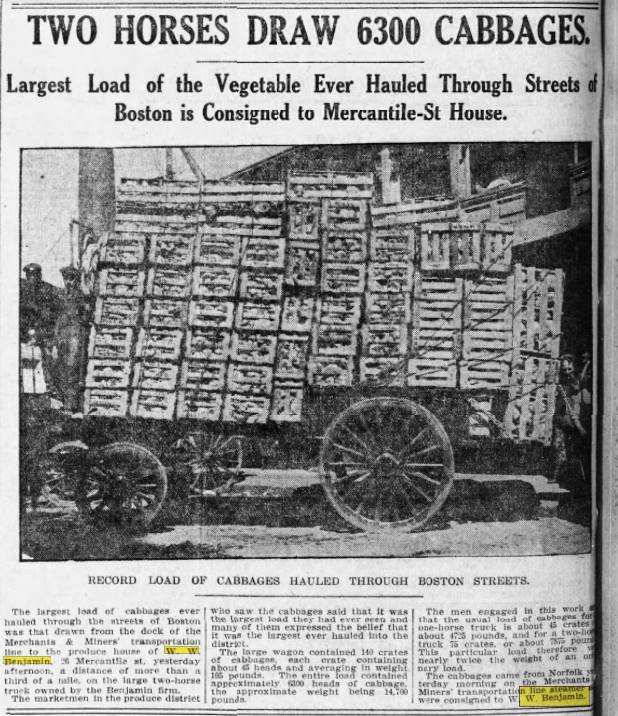
Boston Globe Article concern a load of cabbages

In 1909, Benjamin decided to execute a large publicity demonstration to draw attention to his business. Referred to by the Boston Globe as having been the largest load of cabbage ever hauled through the streets of Boston, the load was drawn into town by two horses on a wagon owned by Benjamin. There were estimated to be 145 crates of cabbage heads, each containing about 45 each, totaling about 6,300 heads, and weighing in at 7.4 tons.

In 1908, he purchased 250 acres of land in Acton, Massachusetts with the intent of growing strawberries, sold by the thousand. He did this up until his death.

In 1912, Benjamin was summoned to Municipal Criminal Court along with other wholesalers for allegedly selling sweet potatoes at a shortage in weight of 20 pounds per barrel. He was later acquitted of the charges.

== Personal life ==
=== Marriage ===
Benjamin remained in Lincoln until he moved to Wareham, Mass., where he married his wife, Sarah Russell Pierce Welles, in 1875, with whom he had six children, only 3 of whom survived to adulthood, in Arlington, Massachusetts. She was the granddaughter of Gideon Welles, Secretary of the Navy under Abraham Lincoln.

In 1907, Sarah filed an attachment for $20,000 against her husband, alleging cruel and abusive treatment.

=== Homes ===
In 1882, Benjamin moved to Somerville, Massachusetts, where he bought a house on 18 Grove Street.

He connected his home in Somerville to the telephone system, obtaining the telephone number “Somerville 99".

In 1908, he purchased a plot of land in West Lenox, Massachusetts, and built upon it a large, 14-room Victorian-styled home.

=== Automobile accidents ===
In 1910, he was involved in the death of 10-year-old John C. McManenon, who jumped in front of his automobile.

In 1914, he was driving when his automobile overturned, killing his two-year-old granddaughter, Virginia Benjamin, and injuring his daughter-in-law and others.

In 1915, he was involved in an accident between two automobiles driven at speed. He was not driving, but his involvement was noted in a newspaper report about it in the Boston Globe the following day.

=== Final years and death ===
In June 1916, his sons Percy Howard and Chester Welles were drafted into World War I. His other 2 surviving sons were not drafted.

In late May, 1917, a large tumor was discovered by his physician in his lower intestine and mesentery region. He underwent an operation on May 31, 1917 in an effort to remove the tumor by surgeon Dr. W. F. Wood, but it was unsuccessful. He died two days later on June 2, 1917 at age 66, leaving an estimated fortune of 500,000 dollars. He was interred in the Benjamin Family plot in Mount Pleasant Cemetery, Arlington, Massachusetts on June 5, 1917, his funeral having taken place that morning.
