= Teele Square =

Intersection in Somerville, Massachusetts

Coordinates: 42°24′12″N 71°7′38″W

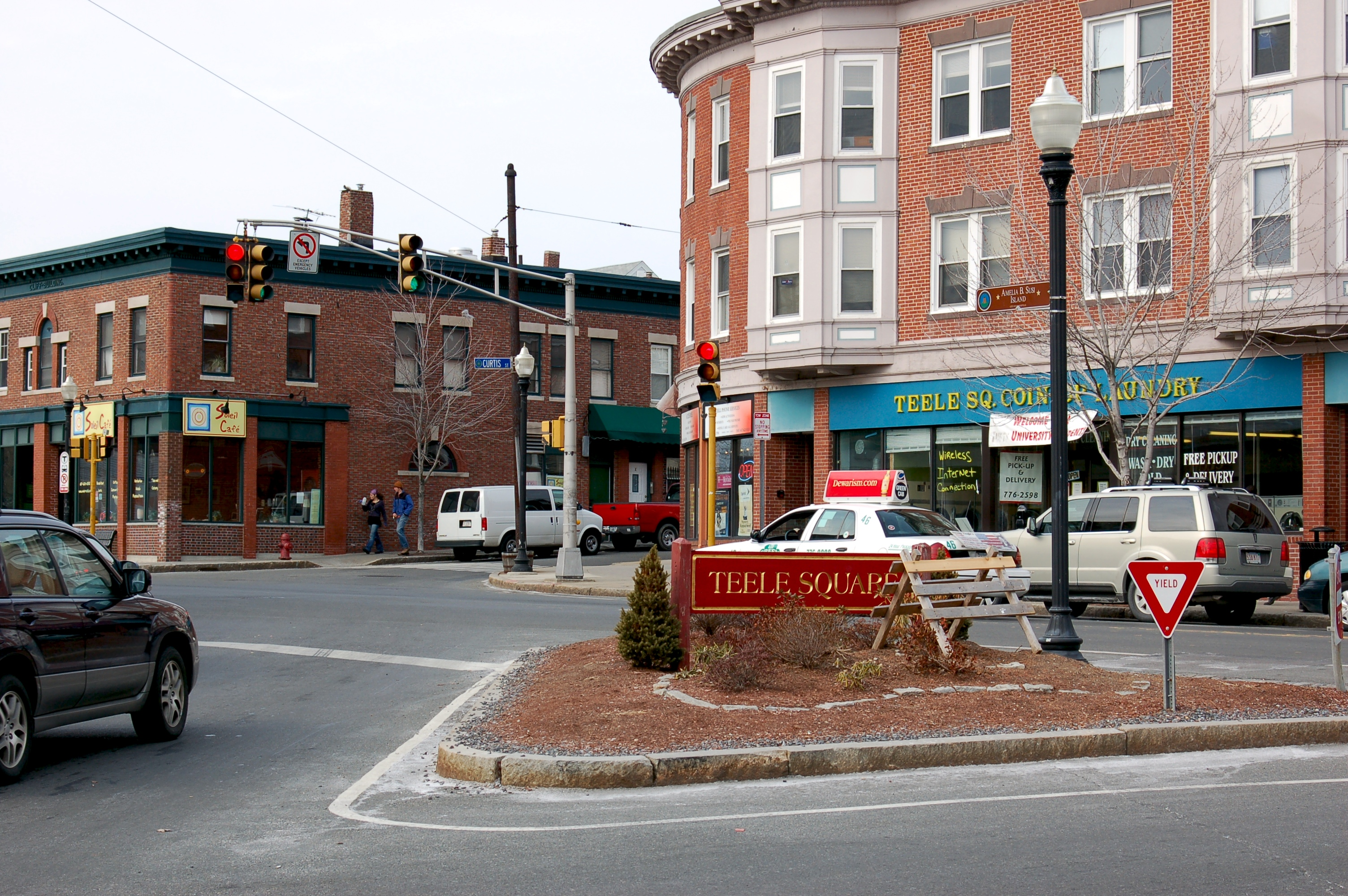
Teele Square in February 2007

Teele Square is at the intersection of Broadway, Holland Street, and Curtis Street in Somerville, Massachusetts, United States, a half-mile from Davis Square and the Davis Square stop on the MBTA Red Line, as well as a half-mile from Alewife Brook Parkway (Route 16) and Powder House Square. The square sits on Clarendon Hill, one of the seven hills in Somerville. The square is named after Jonathan W. Teele, who resided in an early portion of Charlestown that eventually became Somerville in 1842.

The square is within a short walking distance of Tufts University. It is not far from the town lines of Cambridge, Arlington, and Medford.

The square features a wide variety of eateries. There are three convenience stores in Teele Square, a barbershop, three hair salons, and a liquor store. However, Teele Square has been trumped by Davis Square, a larger, much more popular square 1/3 mile (0.54 km) to the east of Teele Square.

On October 30, 2011, at approximately 10:00 p.m., a three-alarm fire broke out in a dry cleaners and destroyed four businesses and a police sub-station in Teele Square.

Teele Square is also home to Ladder 3 and Engine 6 of the Somerville Fire Department.

Within Teele Square and the areas in Teele Square, there is also a large Haitian American population and a large white American population. It is considered one of Somerville's more diverse neighborhoods, along with Winter Hill, East Somerville, and Union Square. Also, Teele Square is a lower income neighborhood compared to the neighborhoods surrounding it.
