= Sullivan Square =

Traffic circle in Boston, Massachusetts

Coordinates: 42°23′4.37″N 71°4′24.03″W

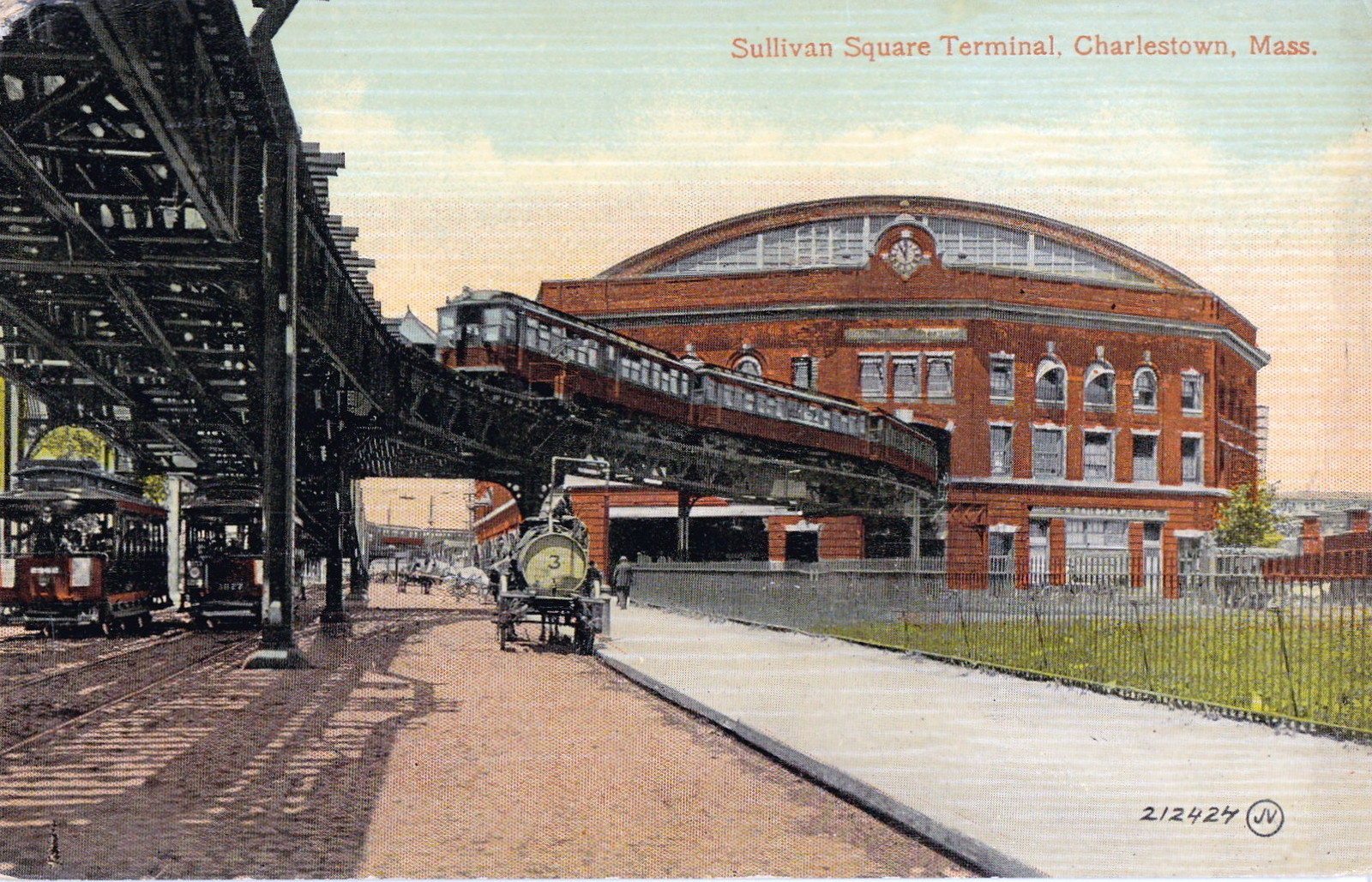
Sullivan Square Station. 1900

Sullivan Square is a traffic circle located at the north end of the Charlestown neighborhood of Boston, Massachusetts. It is named after James Sullivan, an early 19th-century Governor of Massachusetts. The MBTA Orange Line station of the same name is located just west of the square.

== History ==
Prior to the 19th century, Mishawum (later Charlestown) was only connected to the mainland (now Somerville) by an isthmus called "the neck". Roads to Everett (previously a ferry), Medford, and Cambridge and Somerville fanned out from the Charlestown Neck. An extension of the Middlesex Canal from Medford to a millpond at the neck was authorized in 1795 and completed in 1803, with the canal running through where the traffic circle now stands. The junction was eventually named Sullivan Square after James Sullivan, an early 19th-century Governor of Massachusetts who was among the organizers of the canal.

The Boston and Lowell Railroad opened in 1835, followed by the Boston and Maine Railroad (B&M) in 1844. The circumferential Grand Junction Railroad was added in 1849, though it did not have passenger service until the Eastern Railroad used it as Boston access for its main line and Saugus Branch beginning in 1855. The B&M's East Somerville station and the Eastern's Somerville station were located along Cambridge Street just west of Sullivan Square. The presence of the railroad station lead to residential development west of Sullivan Square in East Somerville. Owing to competition from the railroads; canal traffic declined rapidly and it closed in 1853.

The Millers River and surrounding wetlands were filled primarily in the 1870s and 1880s for railroad yards, though Sullivan Square remained a transportation hub. Horsecar service between Somerville and Charlestown began in 1858, supplanted by electric streetcars around 1890. The Boston Elevated Railway (BERy) opened its Main Line Elevated in 1901, with a grand enclosed terminus over Sullivan Square at the north end of the Charlestown Elevated section.

In February 1950, the city began construction on a highway project intended to relieve congestion in the square. The $5 million project replaced the road junction with a large traffic circle; an underpass from Alford Street to Rutherford Street and an overpass from Broadway and Mystic Avenue to Rutherford Street were constructed. A cave-in occurred in November 1950 during underpass construction, and a section of the under-construction overpass collapsed in May 1952. The work was completed in 1953.

Deferred maintenance, salt air corrosion, and complaints about noise led to the downfall of the Elevated (by then the MBTA Orange Line). In 1975, the first phase of the Haymarket North Extension relocated the Orange Line alongside the railroad tracks on the west side of the square; the elevated station was soon demolished. Interstate 93 was simultaneously constructed overhead. In 2002, the overpass was removed due to its deteriorated condition.

The construction of Encore Boston Harbor included $11 million of short-term improvements to the rotary and surrounding roads, which were constructed in 2018–19. A longer-term plan which eliminates the rotary entirely and establishes a local street grid is planned for 2021–2025, with $25 million from the casino and about $150 million from the Boston Region Metropolitan Planning Organization.
