= Somerville, Massachusetts =

- City
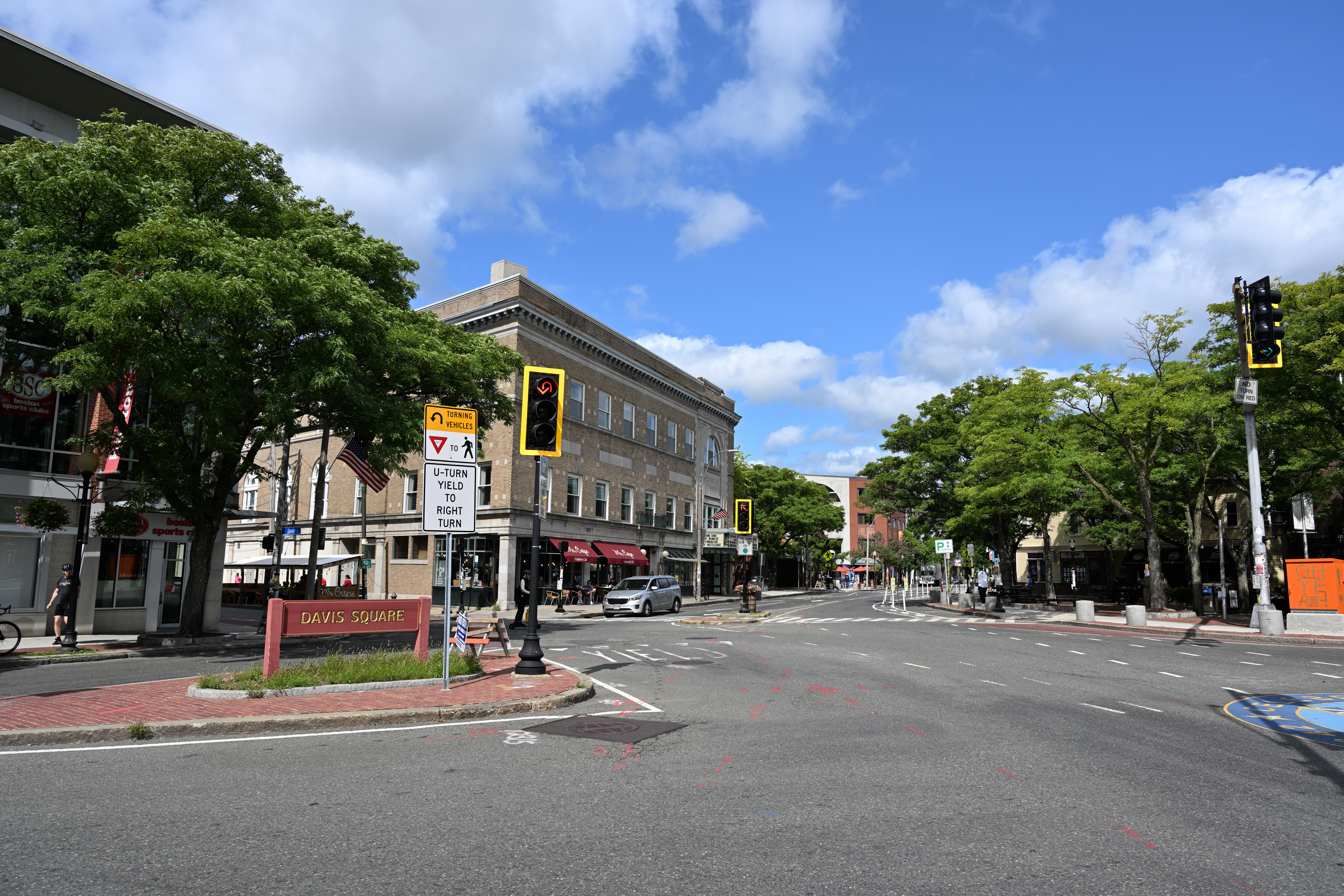
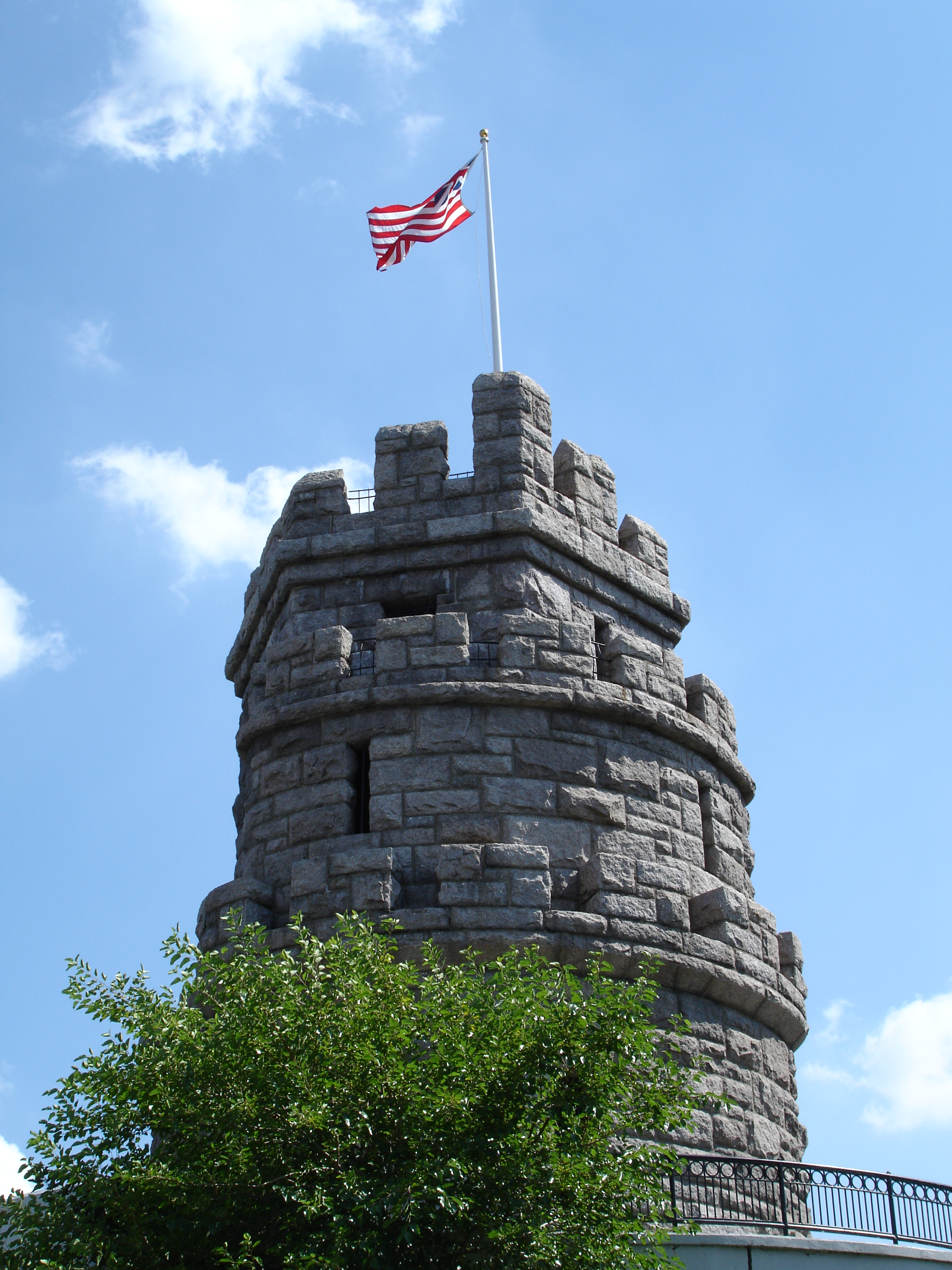
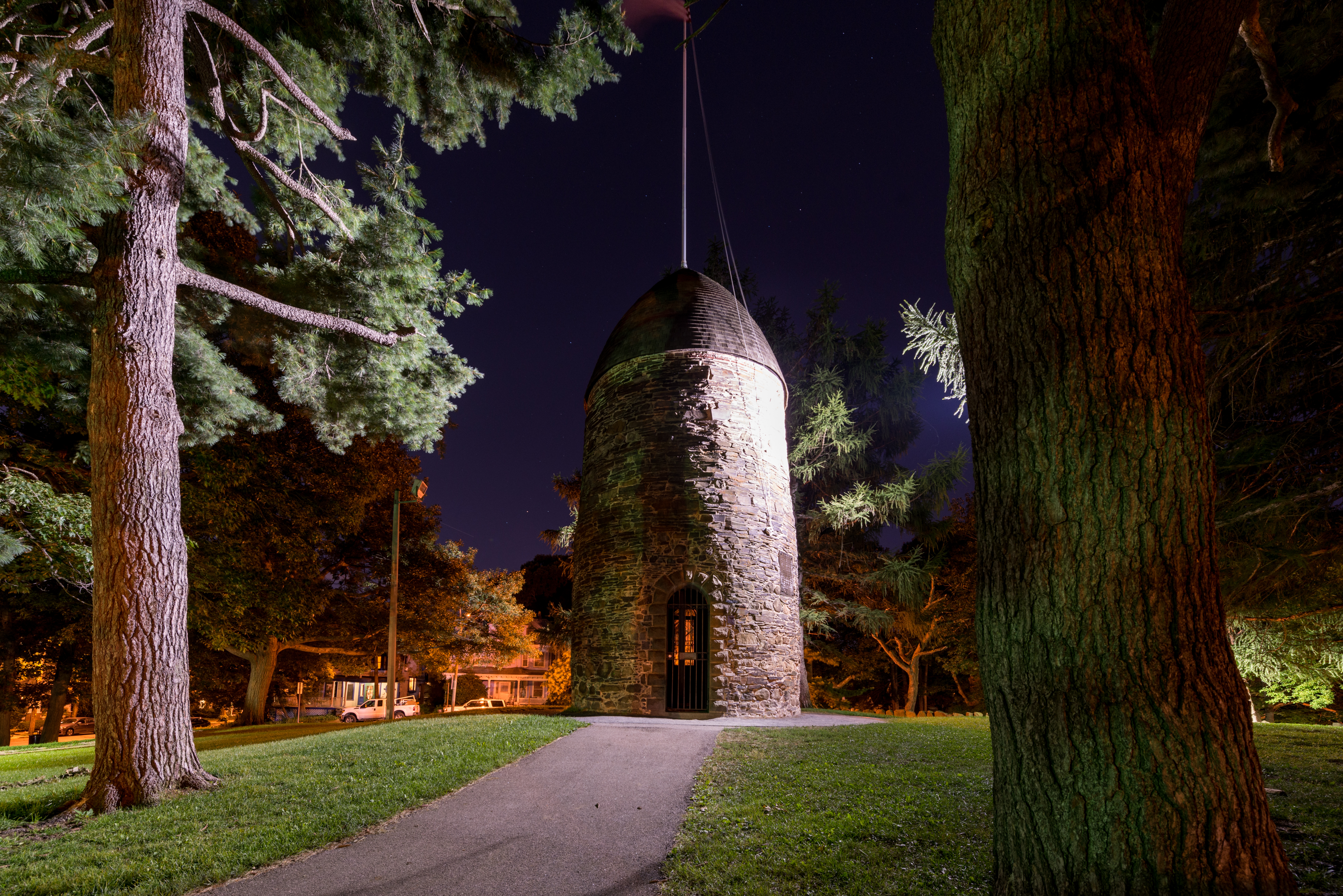
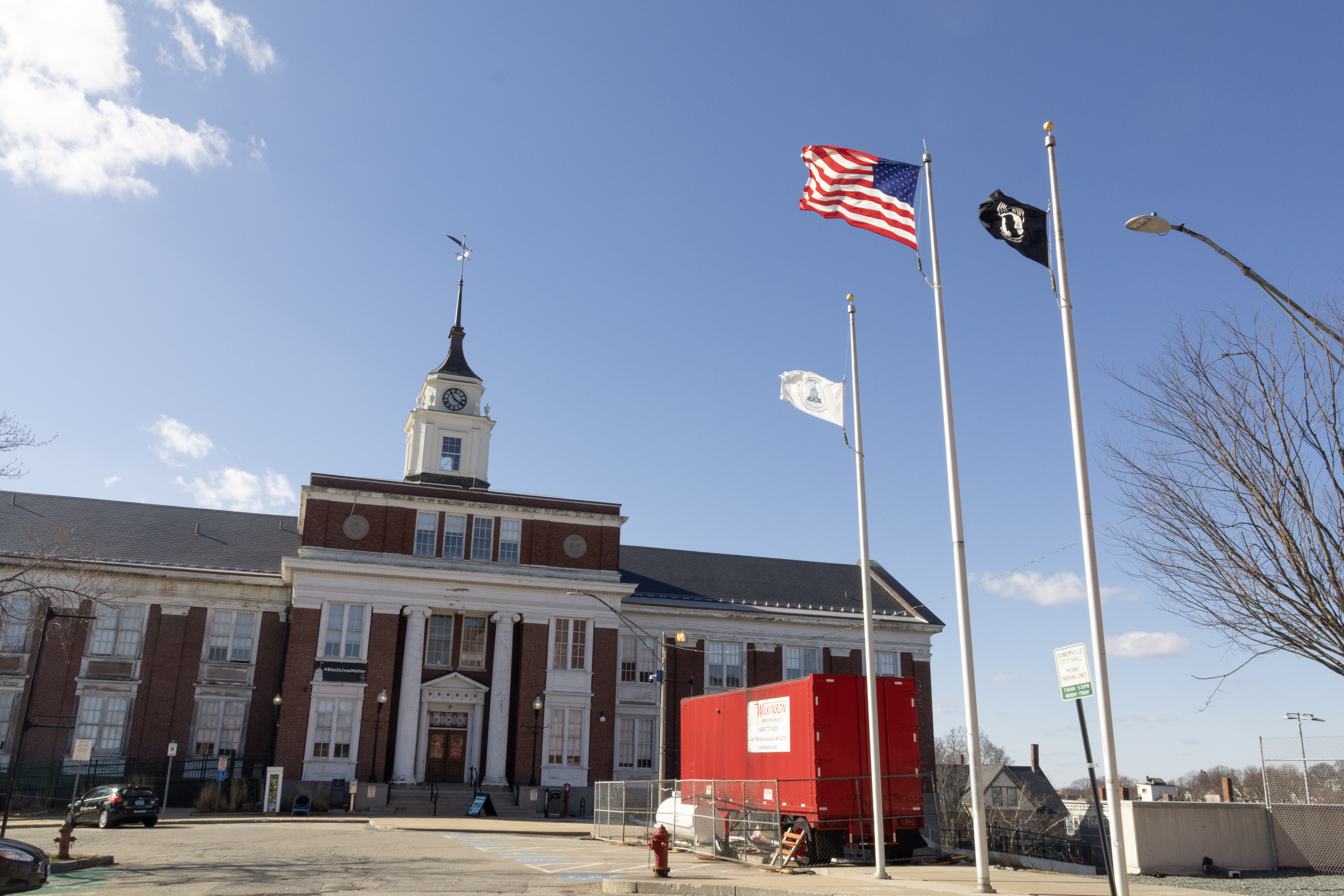
- Davis Square Prospect Hill Monument Old Powder House Somerville City Hall

- Seal
- Motto: "Municipal Freedom Gives National Strength"
- Location in Middlesex County in Massachusetts

- Location in the United States Somerville (the United States)
- Coordinates: 42°23′15″N 71°06′00″W
- Country: United States
- State: Massachusetts
- County: Middlesex
- Region: New England
- Settled: 1629
- Purchased: 1639
- Incorporated (town): 1842
- Incorporated (city): 1872

Government
  - Type: Mayor–council
  - Mayor: Jake Wilson (D)

Area
  - Total: 4.22 sq mi (10.94 km^{2})
  - Land: 4.12 sq mi (10.68 km^{2})
  - Water: 0.10 sq mi (0.26 km^{2})
- Elevation: 13 ft (4 m)

Population (2020)
  - Total: 81,045
  - Density: 19,653.3/sq mi (7,588.17/km^{2})
- Demonym(s): Somervillian, Villen
- Time zone: UTC−5 (Eastern)
  - Summer (DST): UTC−4 (Eastern)
- ZIP Codes: 02143–02145
- Area code: 617 / 857
- FIPS code: 25-62535
- GNIS ID: 0612815
- Website: somervillema.gov

Somerville (/ˈsʌmərvɪl/ SUM-ər-vil) is a city located directly to the northwest of Boston, and north of Cambridge, in Middlesex County, Massachusetts, United States. As of the 2020 United States census, the city had a total population of 81,045 people. With an area of 4.12 square miles (10.7 km^{2}), the city has a density of 19,671/sq mi (7,595/km^{2}), making it the most densely populated municipality in New England and the 19th most densely populated incorporated municipality in the country. Somerville was established as a town in 1842, when it was separated from Charlestown. In 1972, 2009, and 2015, the city received the All-America City Award. It is home to Tufts University, which has its campus along the Somerville and Medford border.

== History ==
=== Indigenous settlement ===
The area that would become Somerville was inhabited for thousands of years prior to European colonization, with multiple archaeological sites indicating habitation in the Mystic River watershed as early as the beginning of the Archaic Period (8000–1000 BCE). At the time of English contact in the 1600s, the Somerville area was inhabited by the Mystic Tribe of the Naumkeag people, headed by the Squaw Sachem and her son Wonohaquaham. Though no archaeological sites within Somerville have been identified from this time period, an indigenous settlement near College Hill in Somerville can be inferred from contemporary written records. The Mystic River continued to be an important regional core for the Naumkeag into the period of European colonization in the 16th and 17th centuries.

In 1627, Mystic sachem Wonohaquaham reportedly gave permission for English settlement at Charlestown, which then included present-day Somerville. In 1639, his mother the Squaw Sachem deeded the land that would become Somerville to English settlers.

=== Early European colonization ===
The territory now constituting the city of Somerville was first settled by Europeans in 1629 as part of Charlestown. In 1629, English surveyor Thomas Graves led a scouting party of 100 Puritans from the settlement of Salem to prepare the site for the Great Migration of Puritans from England. Graves was attracted to the narrow Mishawum Peninsula between the Charles and Mystic rivers, linked to the mainland at the present-day Sullivan Square. The area of earliest settlement was based at City Square on the peninsula, though the territory of Charlestown officially included all of what is now Somerville, as well as Medford, Everett, Malden, Stoneham, Melrose, Woburn, Burlington, and parts of Arlington and Cambridge. From that time until 1842, the area of present-day Somerville was referred to as "beyond the Neck" in reference to the thin spit of land, the Charlestown Neck, that connected it to the Charlestown Peninsula.

The first European settler in Somerville of whom there is any record was John Woolrich, an Indian trader who came from the Charlestown Peninsula in 1630, and settled near what is now Dane Street. Others soon followed Woolrich, locating in the vicinity of present-day Union Square. In 1639 colonists officially acquired the land in what is now Somerville from the Squaw Sachem of Mistick. The population continued to slowly increase, and by 1775 there were about 500 inhabitants scattered across the area. Otherwise, the area was mostly used as grazing and farmland. It was once known as the "Stinted Pasture" or "Cow Commons", as early settlers of Charlestown had the right to pasture a certain number of cows in the area.

John Winthrop, the first colonial governor of the Massachusetts Bay Colony, was granted 600 acres (240 hectares) of land in the area in 1631. Named for the ten small knolls located on the property, Ten Hills Farm extended from the Cradock Bridge in present-day Medford Square to Convent Hill in East Somerville. Winthrop lived, planted, and raised cattle on the farm. It is also where he launched the first ship in Massachusetts, the "Blessing of the Bay". Built for trading purposes in the early 1630s, it was soon armed for use as a patrol boat for the New England coast. It is seen as a precursor to the United States Navy. The "Ten Hills" neighborhood, located in the northeastern part of the city, has retained the name for over 300 years. New research has found that less than a decade after John Winthrop moved to the farm in 1631, there were enslaved Native American prisoners of war on the property. Each successive owner of Ten Hills Farm would depend upon slavery's profits until the 1780s, when Massachusetts abolished the practice.

In a short time, the settlers began laying out roads in all directions in search of more land for planting and trade with various Native American tribes in the area. Laid out as early as the mid-1630s, the earliest highway in Somerville was probably what is now Washington Street, and led from present-day Sullivan Square to Harvard Square. In its earliest days, Washington Street was known as the "Road to Newtowne" (renamed Cambridge in 1638). During the 1700s and early 1800s Somerville Avenue was "Milk Row", a route favored by Middlesex County dairy farmers as the best way to get to the markets of Charlestown and Boston.

Laid out in 1636, Broadway was likely the second highway built in the area. Originally called "Menotomie's Road", it ran from the Charlestown Neck to the settlement at Menotomy (present-day Arlington). Initially bordered by farmsteads, Broadway would come into its own as a commercial thoroughfare after horse-drawn trolleys were introduced to the highway in 1858.

=== Role in the Revolutionary War ===
The Old Powder House in Nathan Tufts Park

Somerville was home to one of the first hostile acts of the American Revolutionary War. The removal of gunpowder by British soldiers from a powder magazine in 1774, and the massive popular reaction that ensued, are considered to be a turning point in the events leading up to war.

First built by settlers in the early 1700s as a windmill, the Old Powder House was sold to the colonial government of Massachusetts for use as a gunpowder magazine in 1747. Located at the intersection of Broadway and College Avenue in present-day Powder House Square, the Old Powder House held the largest supply of gunpowder in all of Massachusetts. General Thomas Gage, who had become the military governor of Massachusetts in May 1774, was charged with enforcement of the highly unpopular Intolerable Acts, which British Parliament had passed in response to the Boston Tea Party. Seeking to prevent the outbreak of war, he believed that the best way to accomplish this was by secretly removing military stores from storehouses and arsenals in New England.

Just after dawn on September 1, 1774, a force of roughly 260 British regulars from the 4th Regiment, under the command of Lieutenant Colonel George Maddison, were rowed in secrecy up the Mystic River from Boston to a landing point near Winter Hill. From there they marched about one mile (1.5 kilometers) to the Powder House, and after sunrise removed all of the gunpowder. Most of the regulars then returned to Boston the way they had come, but a small contingent marched on to Cambridge, seizing two field pieces from the Cambridge Common. The field pieces and powder were then taken from Boston to the British stronghold on Castle Island, then known as Castle William (renamed Fort Independence in 1779).

In response to the raid, amid rumors that blood had been shed, alarm spread through the countryside as far as Connecticut and beyond, and American Patriots sprang into action, fearing that war was at hand. Thousands of militiamen began streaming toward Boston and Cambridge, and mob action forced Loyalists and some government officials to flee to the protection of the British Army. This action provided a "dress rehearsal" for the Battles of Lexington and Concord seven months later in the famous "shot heard 'round the world", and inflamed already heated feelings on both sides, spurring actions by both British and American forces to remove powder and cannon to secure locations.

After the raid on the Powder House, the colonists took action to conceal arms and munitions of war in Concord. When General Gage found out, he was resolved to take the powder by force if necessary. The Americans learned that the British intended to start for Concord on April 18, 1775, and couriers Paul Revere and William Dawes set out on their famous ride to warn the farmers and militiamen in between Boston and Concord, including Sam Adams and John Hancock. That night, he set out from the North End through Charlestown towards East Somerville. In Revere's own written account of his ride, he mentions a specific location in Somerville (then part of Charlestown). The location was the site where the executed body of a local enslaved man known as "Mark", owned by John Codman, was publicly gibbeted and displayed for several years after his execution. The location is probably near the site of the present day Holiday Inn on Washington Street. Revere wrote "nearly opposite where Mark was hung in chains, I saw two men on Horse back, under a Tree", which he then realized were two British officers stationed on Washington Street. They immediately pursued him, and Revere galloped up Broadway towards Winter Hill and eventually eluded them. His warning gave the militia enough time to prepare for battle, and launch the American Revolution.

Shortly after Paul Revere set out on his ride, Lieutenant Colonel Francis Smith and 700 British Army regulars landed near Lechmere Square. As it was nearly high tide, East Cambridge was an island and the troops, skirting the marshes, were obliged to wade "thigh deep" to reach Somerville. They probably came through Prospect Street into Washington Street, and through Union Square.

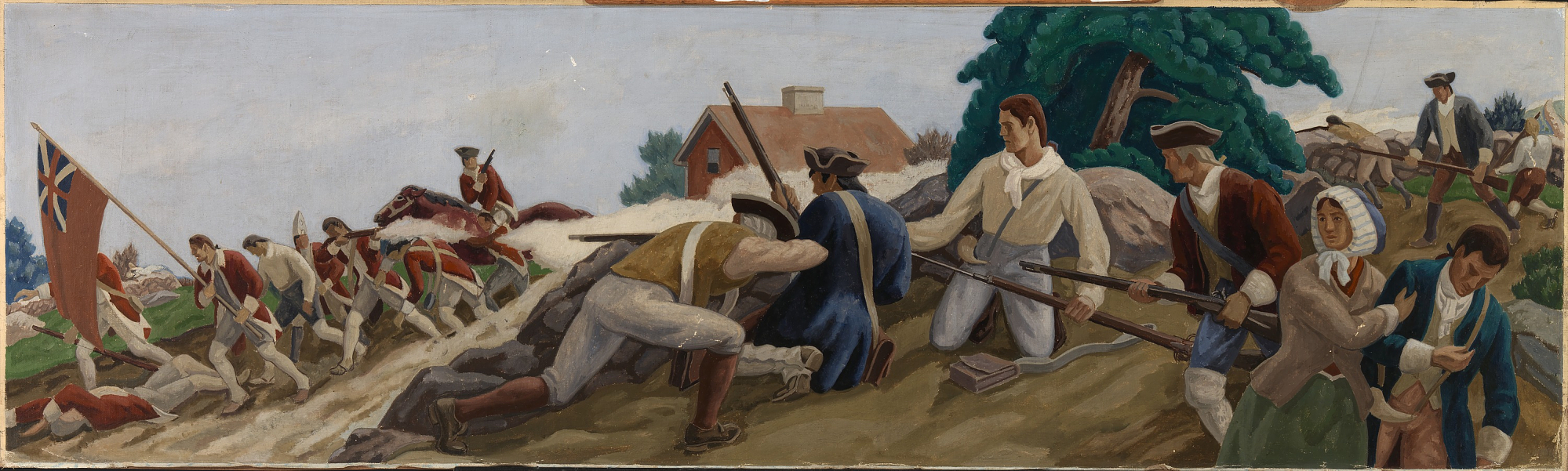
Ross Moffett's A Skirmish Between British and Colonists near Somerville in Revolutionary Times, 1937

Defeated and in retreat, the British army passed again through Somerville en route back to Boston. Upon reaching Union Square, the British marched down Washington Street as far as the base of Prospect Hill, where a skirmish took place. The handful of rebellious locals, having heard of the storied battles at Lexington and Concord earlier that day, caught an exhausted retreating British contingent off guard. As the story goes, 65-year-old minuteman James Miller lost his life in the scuffle while standing his ground against the British. He was shot thirteen times after famously telling a retreating colleague, "I am too old to run."

Somerville occupied a conspicuous position during the entire Siege of Boston, which lasted nine months, and Prospect Hill became the central position of the Continental Army's chain of emplacements north of Boston. Its height and commanding view of Boston and the harbor had tremendous strategic value and the fortress became known as the "Citadel". Originally occupied by just 400 men, Prospect Hill became a primary encampment for American forces after General Israel Putnam's retreat from the Battle of Bunker Hill. It is believed that on January 1, 1776, the Continental Union Flag flew for the first time at the Citadel, the first official raising of an American flag.

=== Independence, urbanization and rapid growth ===
With the Revolutionary War over, the residents of Somerville were able once again to devote their energies wholeheartedly to the business of making a living. From the 1780s until Somerville's separation from Charlestown in 1842, material progress was continuous, if a bit slow. As transportation infrastructure gradually transformed the area, new industries sprang up, such as brickmaking, quarrying and dairy farming.

Transportation improvements in the early to mid-1800s factored significantly in the growth of a more urban residential form and Somerville's incorporation as a City in 1872. These improvements included the opening of the Middlesex Canal through Somerville in 1803, various turnpikes such as Medford and Beacon streets, built during the 1810s and 1820s, and especially the introduction of rail lines. In 1841, the Fitchburg Railroad was built between Boston and Fresh Pond in Cambridge, paralleling the route of Somerville Avenue. This led to the establishment of industries along its path. Soon after, in 1843 the Fitchburg Railroad commenced passenger service and enabled residential development along the southern slopes of Prospect and Spring hills. By the early 1840s, the population of present-day Somerville topped 1,000 for the first time.

Despite the growth, however, discontent was growing steadily outside the "neck". The area's rural farmers paid taxes to the local government in Charlestown, but received little in return. By 1842, the area had no churches, few schools, no taverns, and suffered from poor and impassable roads. For many years after the Revolution the two parts of Charlestown styled "within" and "without the neck" were nearly equal in population; the former had by this time completely outstripped the latter. With this growth of population and trade came the need of city institutions, and consequently greater expenses were involved. Therefore, the rural part of Charlestown found itself contributing to the paving of the streets, the maintenance of a night watch, to the building of engine houses, and various other improvements from which they derived little benefit.

In 1828, a petition was presented to the Legislature asking that a part of Charlestown be set off as a separate town, to be known as Warren. This petition was subsequently withdrawn. The desire for a separate township continued to spread, and by 1841, becoming impatient at the neglect of the government to adequately provide for their needs, the inhabitants again agitated a division of the town, and a meeting in reference to the matter was held November 22 in the Prospect Hill school house.

A petition was accordingly drawn up and signed by Guy C. Hawkins and 151 others, and a committee deputed to further its passage through the legislature, then in session. A bill incorporating a new town was signed by the governor on March 3, 1842. The original choice for the city's new name, after breaking away from Charlestown, was Walford, after the first settler of Charlestown, Thomas Walford. However, this name was not adopted by the separation committee. Charles Miller, a member of this committee, proposed the name "Somerville", which was ultimately chosen. It was not derived from any one person's name, and a report commissioned by the Somerville Historical Society found that Somerville was a "purely fanciful name".

Before Somerville became a township in 1842 the area was primarily populated by British farmers and brick makers who sold their wares in the markets of Boston, Cambridge and Charlestown. As the markets grew, the population of Somerville increased six-fold between the years of 1842 and 1870 to 14,685. With the sharp influx of immigrants to the Somerville area, industry boomed and brick manufacturing became the predominant trade. Before mechanical presses were invented, Somerville produced 1.3 million bricks a year. Thereafter, production increased rapidly to 5.5 million bricks a year, and the success of the brickyards began to attract numerous other industries. In 1851, American Tubes Works opened, followed by meat processing and packaging plants. Other Somerville factories came to produce steam engines, boilers, household appliances, glass, and iron.

Shortly thereafter Somerville incorporated as a city in 1872. The population growth was due in part to improvements in pre-existing transportation lines, as well as a new rail line, the Lexington and Arlington Railroad, introduced through Davis Square in 1870. At its height, Somerville was served by eight passenger rail stations. Somerville's buoyant economy during this period was tied to industries that tended to locate at the periphery of the residential core, near freight rail corridors. By the mid-1870s meat packing plants were the primary employers and profit centers of the community.

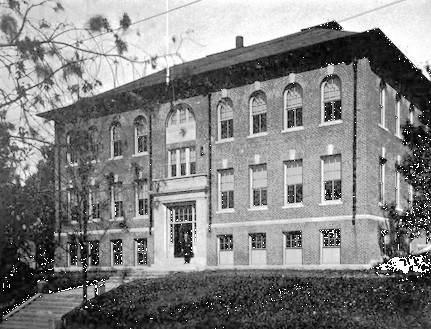
Martha Perry Lowe School (1904)

The Late Industrial Period (1870–1915) was a time of phenomenal growth for Somerville in all spheres including civic and commercial ventures. Infrastructure such as rail, water lines, telegraph and electricity were established and connected to surrounding towns. The population soared from 15,000 to 90,000. While brickmaking had taken a hold in the area after the railroads first arrived in the 1830s, Somerville's brickyards boomed through 1870. Meatpacking soon displaced brickmaking as the primary industry in the city, dubbed "The Chicago of New England". Additionally, Somerville's location adjacent to Boston and proximity to rail and road transportation made it an ideal location for distribution facilities.

It was in this period that Irish immigrants moved to Somerville to work in the brickyards and on the railroad. At the same time, older residents of East Boston and Charlestown moved to Somerville to seek a more bucolic setting than that of more densely populated areas. They also worked to maintain political control over immigrant groups, using slogans such as "Keep Somerville Republican" and establishing a local branch of the anti-Catholic American Protective Association.

Between 1915 and 1930 population growth slowed slightly as Somerville's industries consolidated rather than expanded, and the period's most important enterprises were meat packing, dairy processing, ice and food distribution. In 1920, 73% of meatpacking in Massachusetts occurred in Somerville. Construction of the McGrath Highway in 1925 marked the turning point of Somerville as an industrial city, which accelerated when the Ford Motor Company built a plant in Assembly Square in 1926. In the years that followed, Somerville would see itself transformed into a major industrial center as automobile assembly surpassed meat packing as Somerville's most important industry.

By 1930, 70% of Somerville residents had either been born outside of the United States or had parents who were. The population was then estimated to be 60% Catholic.

Although Union Square and Davis Square continued to be the largest commercial areas during the first decades of the 20th century, smaller, less-developed squares grew as well. Ball Square, Magoun Square and Teele Square were developed with one- or two-story masonry commercial buildings, and the public green at Gilman Square was surrounded by multiple four-story commercial buildings. Retail development and banking facilities also spread. During this time of industrial prosperity, continuing through World War II, the city of Somerville reached its population apex at 105,883 residents in 1940. The building boom continued until the 1940s, creating the dense residential fabric the "city of homes" is known for.

=== Deindustrialization and decline ===
By mid-century, powerful social and economic forces precipitated a period of industrial and population decline that lasted into the 1980s. The postwar period was characterized by the ascent of the private automobile, which carried significant implications for Somerville. Streetcar lines that had crisscrossed the city since 1890 were systematically ripped out and commuter rail service was discontinued at the city's eight railway stations, one by one. Passenger rail service along the Fitchburg and Lowell lines had been declining for some time, and stations such as the Winter Hill station at Gilman Square were removed as early as the late 1940s. Passenger rail service stopped altogether by 1958.

The number of cars on Somerville's streets continued to rise, and road construction projects proliferated. The Alewife Brook Parkway, Mystic Valley Parkway and the Fells Connector Parkways, originally conceived in the 1890s as a means for city residents to reach the metropolitan parks, evolved into congested commuter routes for suburban drivers. Highway projects were advanced in the wake of the Federal-Aid Highway Act of 1956, in some instances displacing entire neighborhoods. The Brickbottom neighborhood was razed in 1950 to prepare for a proposed Inner Belt Expressway, and construction of Interstate 93 resulted in demolition of homes in The States neighborhood during the late 1960s.

In 1970, the state authorized rent control in municipalities with more than 50,000 residents. Somerville, Lynn, Brookline, and Cambridge subsequently adopted rent control. Rent control was repealed statewide in 1994 via ballot initiative. At the time, only Boston, Cambridge, and Brookline had rent control measures in place.

Industry slowly moved outward to the metropolitan fringes, encouraged by highway access and cheap, undeveloped land. The Ford Motor Plant in Assembly Square, which had been one of the region's largest employers, closed its doors in 1958 with severe consequences for the local economy. From the late 1950s through the early 1970s, Finast Supermarkets used the building that had earlier housed the Ford assembly plant on Middlesex Avenue, but in 1976 it too closed its doors. By 1976, Assembly Square was becoming a ghost town: Finast Stores, the Boston and Maine Railroad, and Ford Motor Company, which had each paid the city over $1 million in annual taxes, were gone. By the late 1970s, Somerville was losing population, revenue and jobs.

Somerville also has a history of racial tension. It only hired its first black police officer, a person named Francis Moore, in 1974. Moore subsequently won a suit charging that the police department was "blatantly discriminatory" against him, including an episode in which he was told to patrol the East Somerville neighborhood of Glen Park at night without his issued firearm, night stick, Mace, or communication devices. Moore's name had been written on a barrel in the neighborhood and used for target practice by local youth.

=== Contemporary revitalization ===
In the last years of the 20th century, the situation in Somerville stabilized and growth returned—first to West Somerville, and then the rest of the city.

Almost thirty years after passenger rail service to Somerville was halted, the Red Line Northwest Extension reached Davis Square in 1984. The city and community used the creation of the new station as a catalyst for revitalizing the faded square, promoting new commercial development and sponsoring other physical and infrastructural improvements. However, when the new transit station opened, business around Davis Square did not immediately thrive. The number of retail stores in the area declined from 68 in 1977 to 56 in 1987.

However many non-retail uses, such as beauty salons and real estate offices, had already begun to fill the empty retail spaces. With the Boston area's emergence from its long recession, the area truly began to revive. The community's vision of a rebirth of commercial activity and public transit had, by 2009, been realized. Retail vacancy rates around the square were close to zero as of 2013.

The telecommunication and biotechnology booms of the mid-to-late 1990s significantly contributed to Somerville's revitalization. As with the housing boom a century earlier, the sudden increase in the number of jobs available in the cities of Somerville, Boston, and particularly Cambridge—as well as in the other communities immediately surrounding Somerville—led to a new surge in the demand for housing. Additionally, the end of rent control in Cambridge coincided with the economic recovery in 1995, increasing demand for Somerville's affordable housing options.

The city also had a very high car theft rate, once being the car theft capital of the country, and its Assembly Square area was especially infamous for this. Until the 1990s, Somerville was known colloquially as "Slumerville", a nickname given for its low property values, blue-collar residents and its reputation for crime. However, after the gentrification period the city went through in the 1990s, and an influx of artists to the area, this name has mostly faded from use and the city has instead gained a reputation for its active arts community and effective government. In 2022, the Green Line Extension was completed, bringing passenger rail service to five new stations in Somerville.

Nowadays lobbying by grassroots organizations is attempting to revive and preserve Somerville's "small-town" neighborhood environments by supporting local business, public transit and gardens. For some Somerville residents, some of these efforts, such as the Green Line extension, present a challenge for balancing accessibility of public transit and the need for affordable housing.

== Geography ==
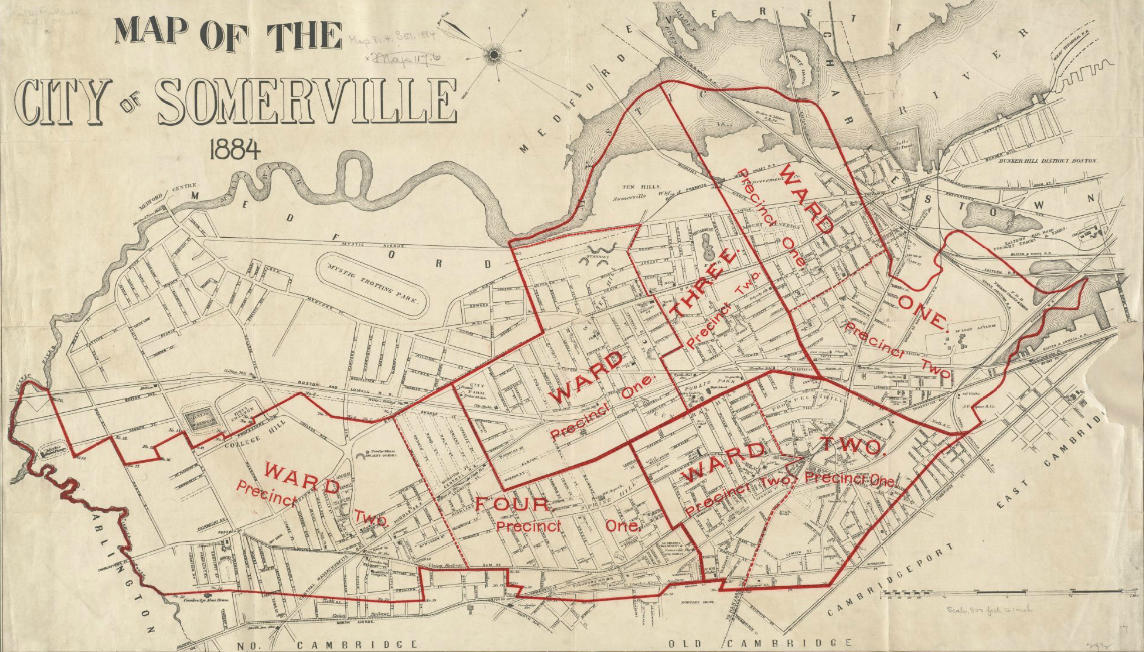
1884 map of Somerville demarcating each of the wards within the city

According to the United States Census Bureau, Somerville has a total area of 4.2 square miles (11 km^{2}), of which 4.1 square miles (11 km^{2}) is land and 0.1 square miles (0.26 km^{2}), or 2.61%, is water. Somerville is bordered by the cities of Cambridge, Medford, Everett, Arlington and the Boston neighborhood of Charlestown. It is located on the west bank of the Mystic River.

Millennia ago, glaciation left a series of drumlins running west to east across the landscape of what would become Somerville. These ridges would later become known as the "Seven Hills" of Somerville (like many other cities claiming to be built on seven hills, following the seven hills of Rome):

1. Central Hill
2. Clarendon Hill
3. Cobble Hill
4. Ploughed Hill (or Mount Benedict)
5. Prospect Hill (or Mount Pisgah)
6. Spring Hill
7. Winter Hill

These hills rise from the floodplain of the Mystic River, and generally run west to east, providing views of Boston to the south and Medford/Everett to the north. Physical boundaries are also defined by prominent waterways: the Mystic River to the north, its tributary Alewife Brook to the west, and the Miller's River to the southeast.

Land in early Somerville was used primarily as grazing commons and small farms. After the proliferation of the railroads in the area during the mid-1800s, industrialization transformed the landscape. In the 1800s, the Millers River was used as a sewer and dumping ground for local industry and would be ordered filled by the Commonwealth before the end of the century, for health reasons. As a result of landfill and the elimination of former Cobble Hill, the Millers River marsh was turned into railyards, slaughterhouses and other large-scale land uses.

=== Squares and neighborhoods ===
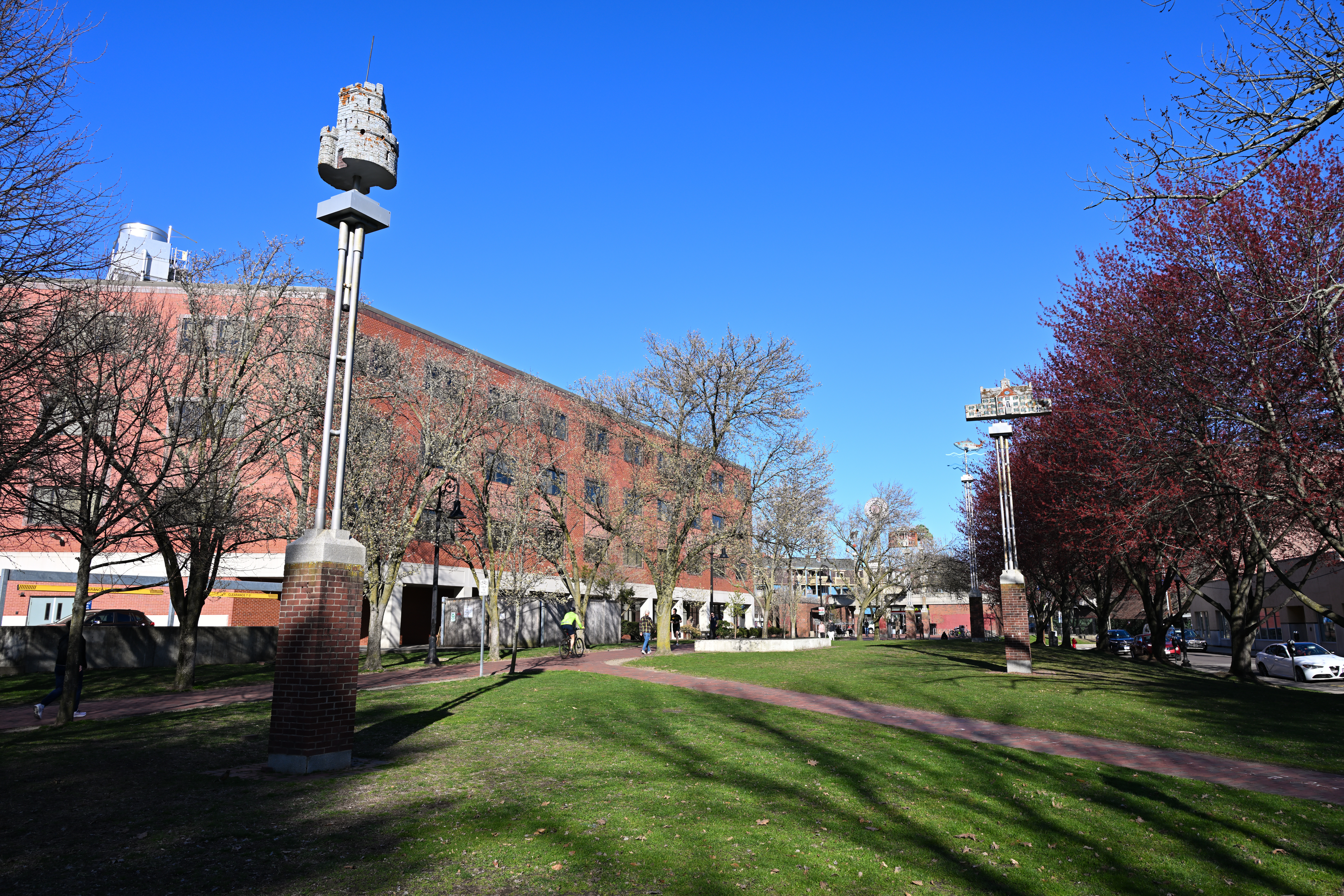
Seven Hills Park at Davis Square. The towers in the park each represent one of the city's original hills.

Somerville's commercial property is not concentrated in a recognized downtown central business district but instead is spread over many different nodes or corridors of business activity. The difference in character ranges from the vibrant nightlife, live music and theaters of Davis Square to the large scale retail and highway access of Assembly Square. This spatial allocation is directly related to the early influence of rail and streetcar systems which caused economic activity to occur at stops. The other key factor in the creation of commercial squares is the area's topography. The numerous hills making up Somerville's landscape determined where road networks would allow neighborhood commercial development.

Somerville has a number of squares that are centers for business and entertainment, as well as a number of other neighborhoods:

- Assembly Square
- Ball Square
- Brickbottom (north of McGrath Highway, south of Inner Belt District)
- Clarendon Hill (near Broadway and Arlington border)
- Davis Square (the Post Office here is called West Somerville, but Google Maps shows West Somerville as a narrow strip near Alewife Brook Parkway and Mystic Valley Parkway, northwest of Teele Square)
- Duck Village (north of Beacon Street, just west of Union Square)
- East Somerville (East of McGrath Highway, between Washington and Broadway Streets)
- Gilman Square (at the junction of Medford Street, Pearl Street, and Marshall Street)
- Inner Belt District
- Magoun Square
- Nunnery Grounds (Mount Benedict)
- Powder House Square
- Prospect Hill (part of Union Square)
- Spring Hill
- The Aves, occasionally known as "The States", or "The Nunnery Grounds" (streets named after U.S. states, between Broadway in East Somerville and I-93 near Assembly Square)
- Teele Square
- Ten Hills
- Tufts
- Union Square
- Wilson Square (Elm Street and Somerville Avenue), known as Oak Square before 1920
- Winter Hill

== Demographics ==
Historical population
Year	Pop.	±%
1850	3,540	—
1860	8,025	+126.7%
1870	14,685	+83.0%
1880	24,933	+69.8%
1890	40,152	+61.0%
1900	61,643	+53.5%
1910	77,236	+25.3%
1920	93,091	+20.5%
1930	103,908	+11.6%
1940	102,177	−1.7%
1950	102,351	+0.2%
1960	94,697	−7.5%
1970	88,779	−6.2%
1980	77,372	−12.8%
1990	76,210	−1.5%
2000	77,478	+1.7%
2010	75,754	−2.2%
2020	81,045	+7.0%
2025*	84,211	+3.9%
* = population estimate. Source: United States census records and Population Estimates Program data. Source: U.S. Decennial Census

Somerville has experienced dramatic growth since the Red Line of Boston's MBTA subway system was extended through Somerville in 1985, especially in the area between Harvard and Tufts. This was especially accelerated by the dot-com bubble of the late 90s, rising incomes, and concomitant rises in demand for urban housing. This growth did not, however, translate into an increase in the population of the city overall, as seen in the table.

Tensions between long-time residents/families and recent arrivals (often referred to as "yuppies") exist, with many of the former accusing the latter of ignoring problems such as drugs and gang violence. Incidents such as anti-"yuppie" graffiti, appearing around town in 2005, highlight this rift. The economic and cultural clash between the city of Somerville and its neighboring cities of Boston and Cambridge has created an underlying tension between residents that has persisted for multiple generations.

Due to Somerville's proximity to various institutions of higher education, the city has a constant influx of college students and young professionals, who reside in sections near Cambridge where Harvard University, Lesley University, and the Massachusetts Institute of Technology are located and near Tufts University, which straddles the Somerville-Medford city line. The city is inhabited by blue collar Irish American, Italian American, Greek American, and Portuguese American families, who are spread throughout the city.

In November 1997, the Utne Reader named Davis Square in Somerville one of the 15 hippest places to live in the U.S.

Somerville has a large arts community and is home to the second highest number of artists per capita in America.

=== Racial and ethnic composition ===
Somerville, Massachusetts – Racial and ethnic composition Note: the US Census treats Hispanic/Latino as an ethnic category. This table excludes Latinos from the racial categories and assigns them to a separate category. Hispanics/Latinos may be of any race.
Race / Ethnicity (NH = Non-Hispanic)	Pop 2000	Pop 2010	Pop 2020	% 2000	% 2010	% 2020
White alone (NH)	56,320	52,359	52,874	72.69%	69.12%	65.24%
Black or African American alone (NH)	4,868	4,869	4,215	6.28%	6.43%	5.20%
Native American or Alaska Native alone (NH)	128	90	80	0.17%	0.12%	0.10%
Asian alone (NH)	4,972	6,578	8,567	6.42%	8.68%	10.57%
Pacific Islander alone (NH)	33	16	12	0.04%	0.02%	0.01%
Some Other Race alone (NH)	1,197	1,689	1,288	1.54%	2.23%	1.59%
Mixed Race or Multi-Racial (NH)	3,174	2,136	4,850	4.10%	2.82%	5.98%
Hispanic or Latino (any race)	6,786	8,017	9,159	8.76%	10.58%	11.30%
Total	77,478	75,754	81,045	100.00%	100.00%	100.00%

=== 2020 census ===
As of the 2020 census, Somerville had a population of 81,045 and a population density of 19,656.8 inhabitants per square mile (7,589.5/km^{2}).

The median age was 31.4 years. 11.4% of residents were under the age of 18 and 9.9% of residents were 65 years of age or older. For every 100 females there were 96.4 males, and for every 100 females age 18 and over there were 94.9 males age 18 and over.

100.0% of residents lived in urban areas, while 0.0% lived in rural areas.

There were 34,448 households in Somerville, of which 16.5% had children under the age of 18 living in them. Of all households, 28.9% were married-couple households, 26.2% were households with a male householder and no spouse or partner present, and 33.0% were households with a female householder and no spouse or partner present. About 29.9% of all households were made up of individuals and 8.6% had someone living alone who was 65 years of age or older.

There were 36,269 housing units, of which 5.0% were vacant. The homeowner vacancy rate was 1.4% and the rental vacancy rate was 2.8%.

Racial composition as of the 2020 census
Race	Number	Percent
White	54,388	67.1%
Black or African American	4,449	5.5%
American Indian and Alaska Native	202	0.2%
Asian	8,614	10.6%
Native Hawaiian and Other Pacific Islander	27	0.0%
Some other race	5,115	6.3%
Two or more races	8,250	10.2%
Hispanic or Latino (of any race)	9,159	11.3%

The city regularly provides translation services and alerts into Spanish, Portuguese, Haitian Creole, and Nepali.

=== Income ===
The median income for a household in the city was $108,896 (in 2021 dollars), and the per capita income for the city was $58,437. About 10.4% of the residents were below the poverty line.

== Economy ==
Somerville's industrial past left behind many legacies, including the invention of Marshmallow Fluff by Archibald Query. In 1914, the city became the home of the original Economy Grocery Store, which later grew into the Stop & Shop grocery chain. Two related food service chains, Steve's Ice Cream and Bertucci's, sprung from adjacent lots in Davis Square.

Companies based in Somerville today include Gentle Giant Moving Company, Formlabs, Candlewick Press and Evergage.

In 2016, one of the Commonwealth's largest employers, the Mass General Brigham healthcare system moved its headquarters to the redeveloped Assembly Square location in the city. In the timeframe since, a growing number of other entities have placed purpose-built corporate offices both in Assembly Row and other developments in Union Square. Work is additionally being considered to extend development along the Amelia Earhart Dam to connect the nearby Everett with pedestrian bridges to allow more commuters to walk or cycle to the Assembly Row development from neighboring communities.

=== Top employers ===
According to Somerville's 2024 Comprehensive Annual Financial Report, the top employers in the city are:

Rank	Employer	Employees (# of)
1	City of Somerville (the city government)	1,402
2	Cambridge Health Alliance	1,152
3	Bluebird Bio, Inc	513
4	Stop & Shop	408
5	Formlabs, Inc.	400
6	Trustees of Tufts College	397
7	Massachusetts General Brigham Health Plan	367
8	Rogers Foam Corporation	350
9	Home Depot	334
10	NGP VAN	296

== Arts and culture ==
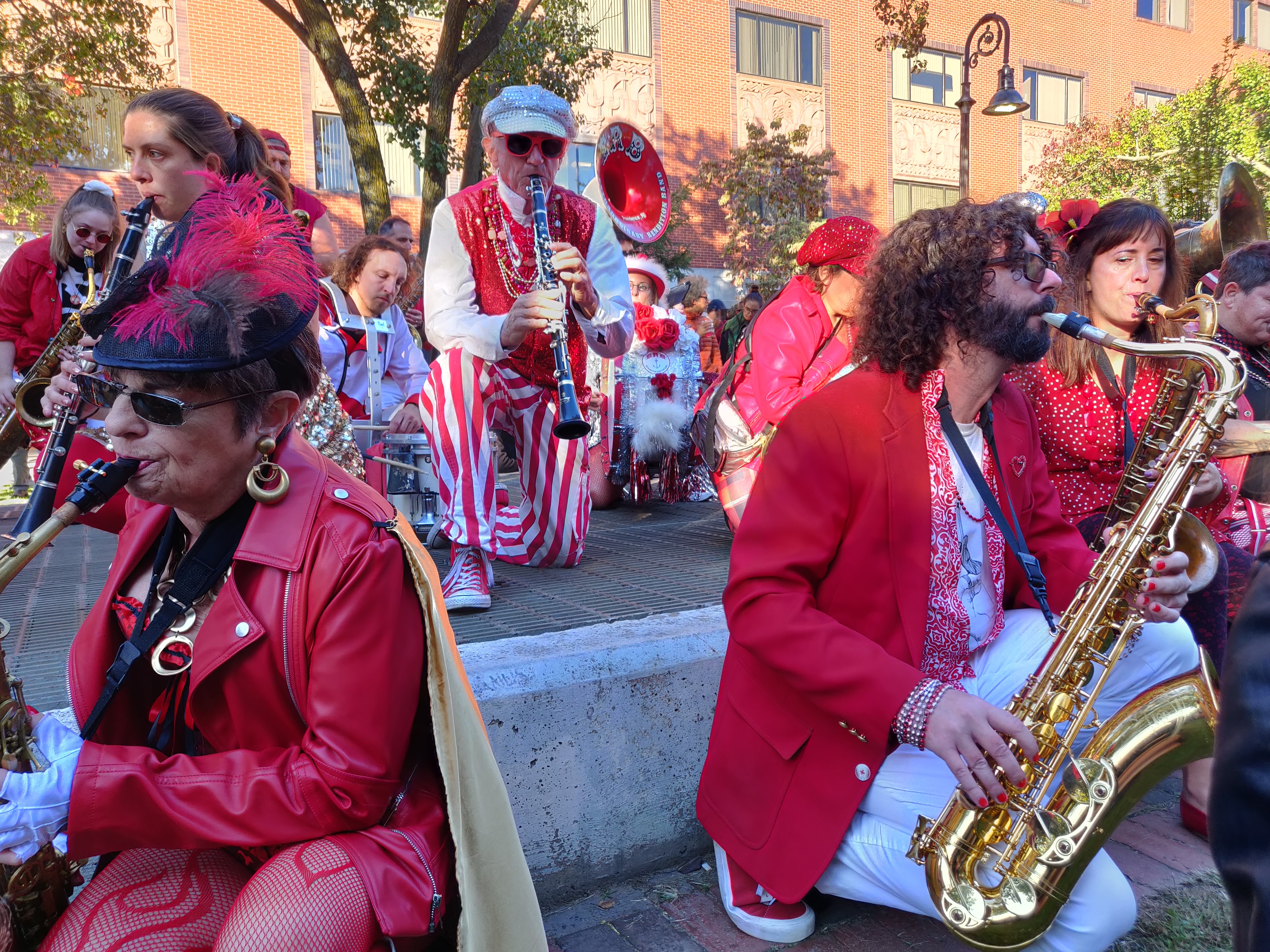
HONK! 2022 street band performers near Davis Square

Davis Square is home to the Somerville Theatre, which formerly housed the Museum of Bad Art and plays host to the Independent Film Festival of Boston each spring. Union Tavern and the Crystal Ballroom are live music venues in the city.

Somerville has been home to Porchfest, which is a citywide festival that features around 200 bands every May at residents' houses. It has been around since 2011.

Two major art studios, the Brickbottom Artists Building and the Joy Street Studios, are located in former industrial buildings in the Brickbottom district. The Brickbottom Artists Association has been hosting annual open studio events in the fall since 1987. Starlab Studios, a multimedia artist studio space and the host of Somerville's annual Starlabfest, opened in Union Square in 2009. Additionally, Artisan's Asylum on Tyler Street between Union and Porter squares is a hackerspace, where 150 members and 200 students have been participating in the maker culture since 2011.

The Somerville Public Library has three branches.

The Somerville Arts Council and Somerville Open Studios both host annual events involving the community in homegrown arts. The Boston chapter of the Dorkbot community meets in Somerville at the Willoughby & Baltic studio, in the Brickbottom district. Starting in 2006, an annual Fluff Festival has been held to celebrate the invention of Marshmallow Fluff in Somerville. "What the Fluff?" is produced by Union Square Main Streets and includes vendors, activities, entertainment and the crowning of the Pharaoh of Fluff. It has been described in food journal Gastronomica as an "orgiastic frenzy of all things fluffy--old-world village celebration meets American kitsch". Then-mayor Joseph Curtatone attended in 2006 and declared, "My house always has been, and always will be, stocked with fluff."

The popular Halloween holiday song Monster Mash was written and sung by Somerville native Bobby "Boris" Pickett

=== Points of interest ===
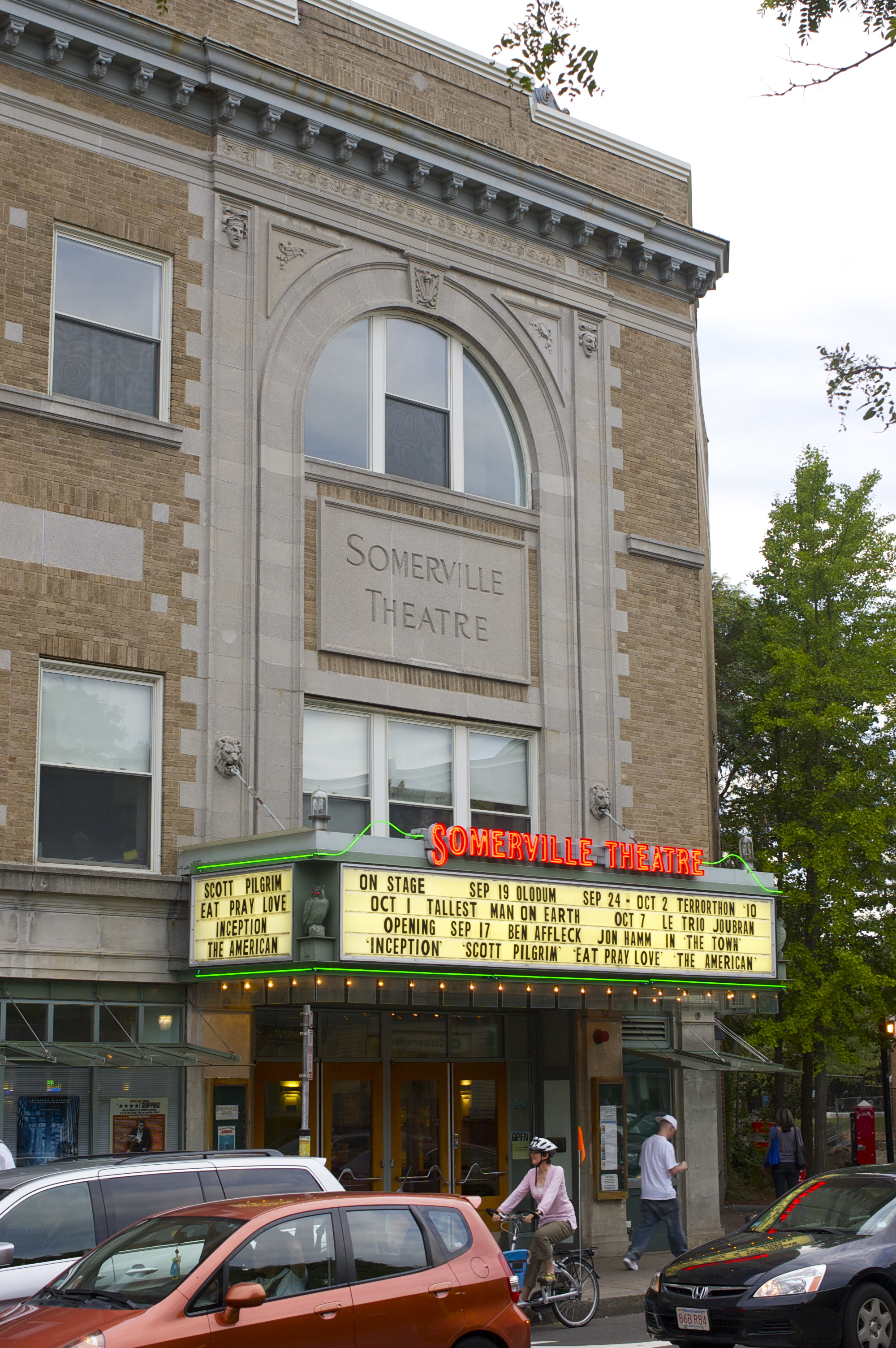
Entrance of the Somerville Theatre

==== Dilboy Stadium ====
George Dilboy Memorial Stadium is a multi-purpose public stadium in the city. It is known as the home of the Boston Renegades women's tackle football team. It was also the home field of the Boston Militia women's tackle football team from 2008 to 2014. The Boston Breakers women's soccer club made Dilboy Stadium their home in 2012 and 2013. The stadium is named after George Dilboy, who was awarded the Medal of Honor during World War I.

==== Historic places ====
Somerville has eighty-four sites listed on the National Register of Historic Places. These places include various houses, libraries, parkways, churches, among other places, and have been declared landmarks within the city.

==== Somerville Museum ====
The Somerville Museum preserves memorabilia chronicling the city's roots, with historical and artistic exhibits. It is located at 1 Westwood Road, on the corner of Central Street.

== Parks and recreation ==
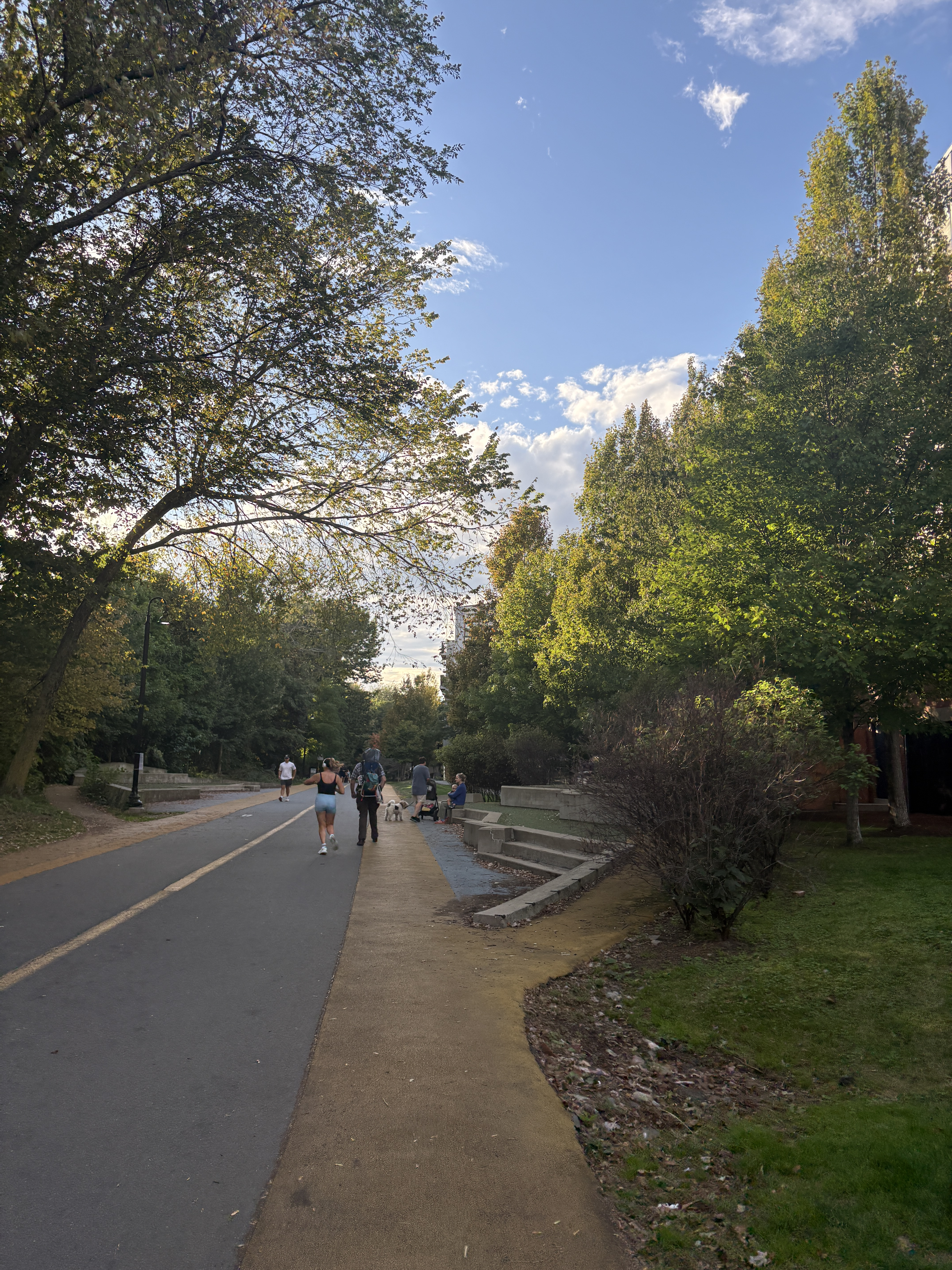
Somerville Community Path

The Somerville Community Path is a tree-lined rail trail that runs from Lowell Street to the Cambridge border near Davis Square. It connects with the Alewife Linear Park, which in turn connects with the Minuteman Bikeway and the Fitchburg Cutoff Path. Community activists hope to extend the path eastward to Lechmere Square, which would connect with the Charles River Bike Paths and the proposed East Coast Greenway. In May 2013, construction began on an extension of the path between Cedar and Lowell streets, which was completed in 2015. As of 2010, the city has a total of 63 parks, playgrounds, playing fields, and community gardens.

With the establishment of the Playground Association of America in 1906, many cities, including Somerville, began to sponsor supervised playgrounds for the children of the city during the summer months. Though the Recreation Department was not formally established in Somerville until 1917, supervised play, sponsored in part by the city and the Playground Association of America, began in 1909.

The Recreation Department provides many recreational and play activities for residents of all ages, including Summertime Playgrounds, outdoor games and sports leagues, theater groups, and an active Senior Citizens Club.

== Government ==
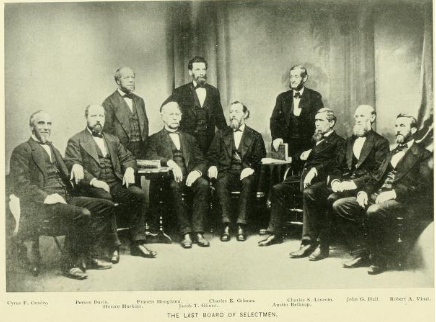
The final Town of Somerville board of selectmen in 1871 before incorporation as a city the next year.

=== City government ===
Somerville has a mayor-city council form of municipal government. The City Council (formerly a Board of Aldermen) consists of four at-large (citywide) positions and seven ward representatives, where each ward is a specific section of the city. The change from Aldermen to Council came in 2018 when gender equity was honored. As of January 2, 2026, the council president is Lance Davis.

The first Democratic mayor of the city was John J. Murphy in 1929. Every mayor prior, since 1872, had been unaffiliated with a party or Republican. Murphy succeeded on his seventh try by uniting the Irish, Italian, Greek, and Portuguese communities. There were candlelit processions with thousands marching in rallies in the middle of Union Square and other squares in the city. The current mayor of Somerville is Jake Wilson.

In July 2020, the Somerville City Council voted to recognize polyamorous domestic partnerships in the city, becoming the first city in the United States to do so. This measure was passed in order to allow those in a polyamorous relationship easier access to their partners' health insurance.

Alongside these, Somerville boasts a large subsidized housing program with 1400 units and 4,328 people (5% of the population) living in them. There are 13 developments, the largest being the Mystic River Projects and Clarendon Hill Apartments.

=== Federal and state representation ===
Somerville is part of Massachusetts's 7th congressional district for purposes of elections to the United States House of Representatives. It is represented by Representative Ayanna Pressley.

For representation to the Massachusetts Senate, Somerville is entirely within the Second Middlesex district. For representation to the Massachusetts House of Representatives, Somerville is part of the 26th, 27th and 34th Middlesex districts. The 26th Middlesex district includes East Somerville, Brickbottom, and a portion of the Union Square area, as well as portions of Cambridge, The 34th Middlesex district includes Winter Hill and Teele Square, as well as portions of Medford. The remainder of the city, just over half, is the 27th Middlesex district, which is entirely within Somerville.

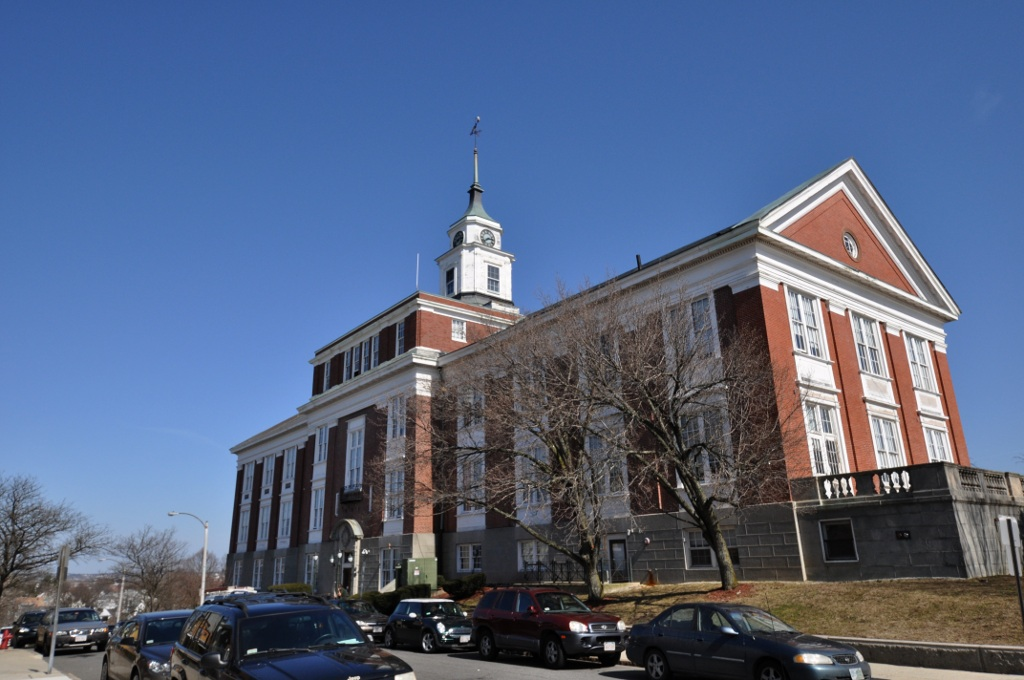
Somerville City Hall

Presidential election results

Presidential election results
Year	Democratic	Republican
2024	83.9% 33,218	11.4% 4,512
2020	87.7% 37,027	10.1% 4,283
2016	83.5% 33,740	10.2% 4,128
2012	82.1% 28,853	13.9% 4,885
2008	81.4% 26,665	15.9% 5,215
2004	80.3% 24,300	17.3% 5,232
2000	69.3% 19,984	15.5% 4,468
1996	75.8% 20,206	14.9% 3,983
1992	65.1% 19,792	19.4% 5,883
1988	69.3% 21,612	28.6% 8,931
1984	64.7% 21,065	34.8% 11,318
1980	54.3% 16,931	30.6% 9,533
1976	68.3% 21,312	27.1% 8,444
1972	66.9% 22,386	32.5% 10,873
1968	77.3% 27,141	17.9% 6,278
1964	86.7% 34,454	13.0% 5,175
1960	74.6% 33,498	25.2% 11,301
1956	49.2% 21,802	50.4% 22,342
1952	55.2% 27,066	44.6% 21,878
1948	65.3% 30,959	32.6% 15,466
1944	54.3% 22,690	45.5% 18,982
1940	54.1% 24,626	45.3% 20,625
1936	50.1% 20,672	40.1% 16,515
1932	54.5% 20,114	43.8% 16,171
1928	52.6% 21,127	47.2% 18,981
1924	29.0% 8,555	60.5% 17,806
1920	25.6% 6,113	72.1% 17,246
1916	42.4% 5,275	55.6% 6,920
1912	33.5% 4,062	30.8% 3,737
1908	25.7% 2,760	67.5% 7,264
1904	30.0% 2,884	65.8% 6,330
1900	29.2% 2,284	67.1% 5,255
1896	14.2% 1,156	79.1% 6,442
1892	39.2% 2,826	58.5% 4,222
1888	36.4% 1,821	62.1% 3,108
1884	38.1% 1,525	52.6% 2,106
1880	34.1% 1,169	65.6% 2,248
1876	41.2% 1,262	58.8% 1,801
1872	33.6% 593	66.4% 1,169
1868	34.3% 444	65.7% 849

Voter Registration and Party Enrollment as of August 24, 2024
Party	Number of Voters	Percentage
Democratic	24,005	47.9%
Republican	1,432	2.7%
Unaffiliated	29,192	48.3%
Total	55,131	100%

=== Sanctuary city status ===
Somerville adopted the sanctuary city status in 1987 under the Eugene Brune mayoral administration. Since then, that status has been re-affirmed by the city government several times, including in 2017 during Donald Trump's first administration by then-mayor Joseph Curtatone. Its status was also re-affirmed when, following the re-election of Donald Trump, the city approved a resolution proclaiming it to be a "Welcoming Community for justice, equity, and inclusion".

Following threats from the second Trump administration to withdraw federal funds from sanctuary cities, Somerville, under then-mayor Katjana Ballantyne's administration and alongside the city of Chelsea, Massachusetts, sued the Trump administration.

== Education ==
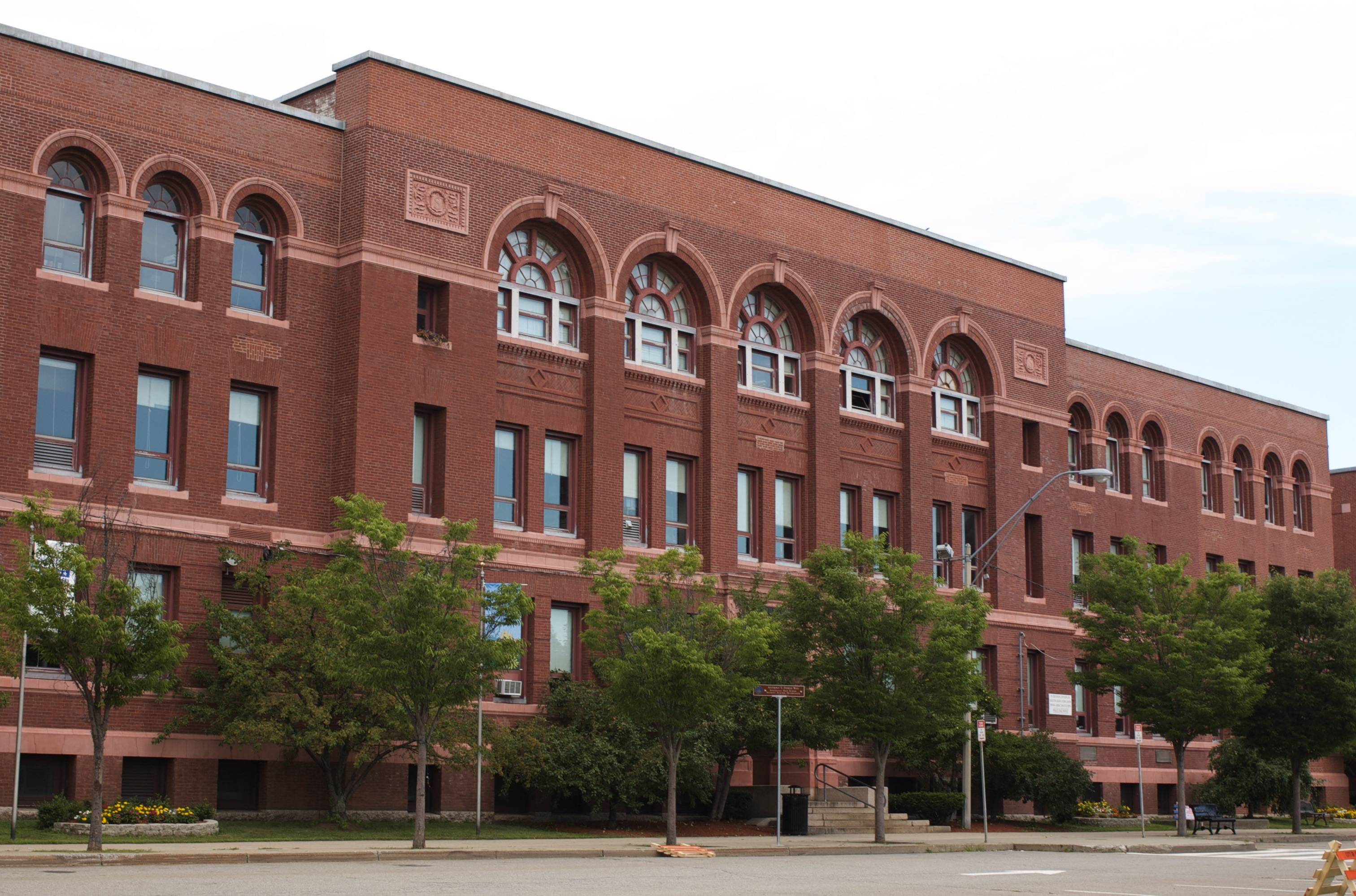
Façade of the former Somerville High School

The School Committee has seven independently elected officials as well as the Mayor and the President of the City Council. The budget is approved by both the School Committee and the City Council. The Chair is Dr. Emily Ackman from Ward 1 and the Vice Chair is Leiran Biton from Ward 7.

Also included in the school district is the Somerville Center for Adult Learning Experiences (SCALE). Though formally listed as being located in Medford, Tufts University is also located in Somerville. The Somerville–Medford line runs through the Tufts campus, splitting the university's Tisch Library. The school employs many local residents and has many community service projects that benefit the city, especially those run through the Leonard Carmichael Society and the Jonathan M. Tisch College of Citizenship and Public Service.

=== Somerville Public Schools ===
Somerville Public Schools (SPS) operates ten schools from pre-kindergarten to secondary schools. The majority of the schools in Somerville (with the exception of Somerville High School, Benjamin G. Brown School, Capuano Early Childhood Center, and Next Wave/Full Circle) are schools that go from kindergarten through 8th grade. As of the 2025-2026 school year, there were 4,876 students enrolled in Somerville Public Schools.

- Somerville High School
- East Somerville Community School
- Arthur D. Healey School
- John F. Kennedy School
- Benjamin G. Brown School (K–5)
- West Somerville Neighborhood School
- Albert F. Argenziano School
- Winter Hill Innovation Community School
- Michael E. Capuano Early Childhood Center (pre-kindergarten and kindergarten)
- Next Wave/Full Circle (grades 6–12)
- Edgerly Education Center

East Somerville Community School, which was temporarily closed after a fire in 2007, was demolished and reconstructed, reopening in fall 2013. During its closure students were transferred to the nearby Edgerly and Capuano schools.

Somerville High School underwent renovations after having been the oldest un-renovated high school in the nation. Its renovations lasted from early 2012 to January 2021.

The Winter Hill school building has been closed since April 2023, following an incident where a slab of concrete broke off onto the floor of a stairwell. Suffering from foundation weakening and lack of maintenance, the school was deemed unsafe for public use and is indefinitely closed. Students and staff have since relocated to the Edgerly building as of the 2023 school year. The Winter Hill School is currently being considered for replacement with funding from the Massachusetts School Building Authority.

==== Somerville High School ====
Somerville High School (SHS) is located right next to the Somerville City Hall at 81 Highland Avenue. It is in Winter Hill near the border of East Somerville and Union Square.

Somerville High School offers a vocational program (CTE) as well as musical programs and athletics programs. It hosts 1,367 students throughout 4 grades as of the 2025-2026 school year. Its student proficiency in math and science is at 73% and its proficiency for English and history is at 83%. Its student to teacher ratio is 10:1. It is in the top 20% of the state's schools composite averages. It has a graduation rate of 89.9%.

The school demographics as of 2021 are 45% Hispanic or Latino, 32% White, 14% African American, 8% Asian and 1% other. 54.6% of students in the school do not have English as their first language. 48.1% of students are economically disadvantaged. 16.9% of students have a disability.

Dilboy Stadium is where the SHS soccer, football, lacrosse, tennis and track teams compete. It is located on 110 Alewife Brook Parkway, roughly 2 1/2 miles (4 kilometers) from the school itself. It is close to the Dilboy Pool (which is open solely in the summer), as well as the Clarendon Hill Towers and Clarendon Hill Projects (an installment of the Somerville Housing Authority). The SHS hockey team plays at Veterans Memorial Rink at 570 Somerville Avenue next to Conway Park and Playground.

Somerville High School is home to the student theatre group Highlander Theatre Company, which performs full-length and shorter productions every year.

The school is also home to the FIRST Robotics Competition team, FRC 6201 The Highlanders, who competes in the FIRST Robotics Competition every year.

In the spring of the 2022–2023 school year, the school's practice field was completed and the Somerville Memorialization Committee voted to dedicate the field to Phil Reavis. This field is the first public space dedicated to an African American in Somerville.

=== Higher education ===
Somerville is home to Tufts University, situated predominantly in the northwestern portion of the city. Lincoln Technical Institute also has a campus in the city. Lesley University additionally possesses an urban campus around the Porter Square area which has expanded and partly overlaps to Somerville Avenue.

== Media ==
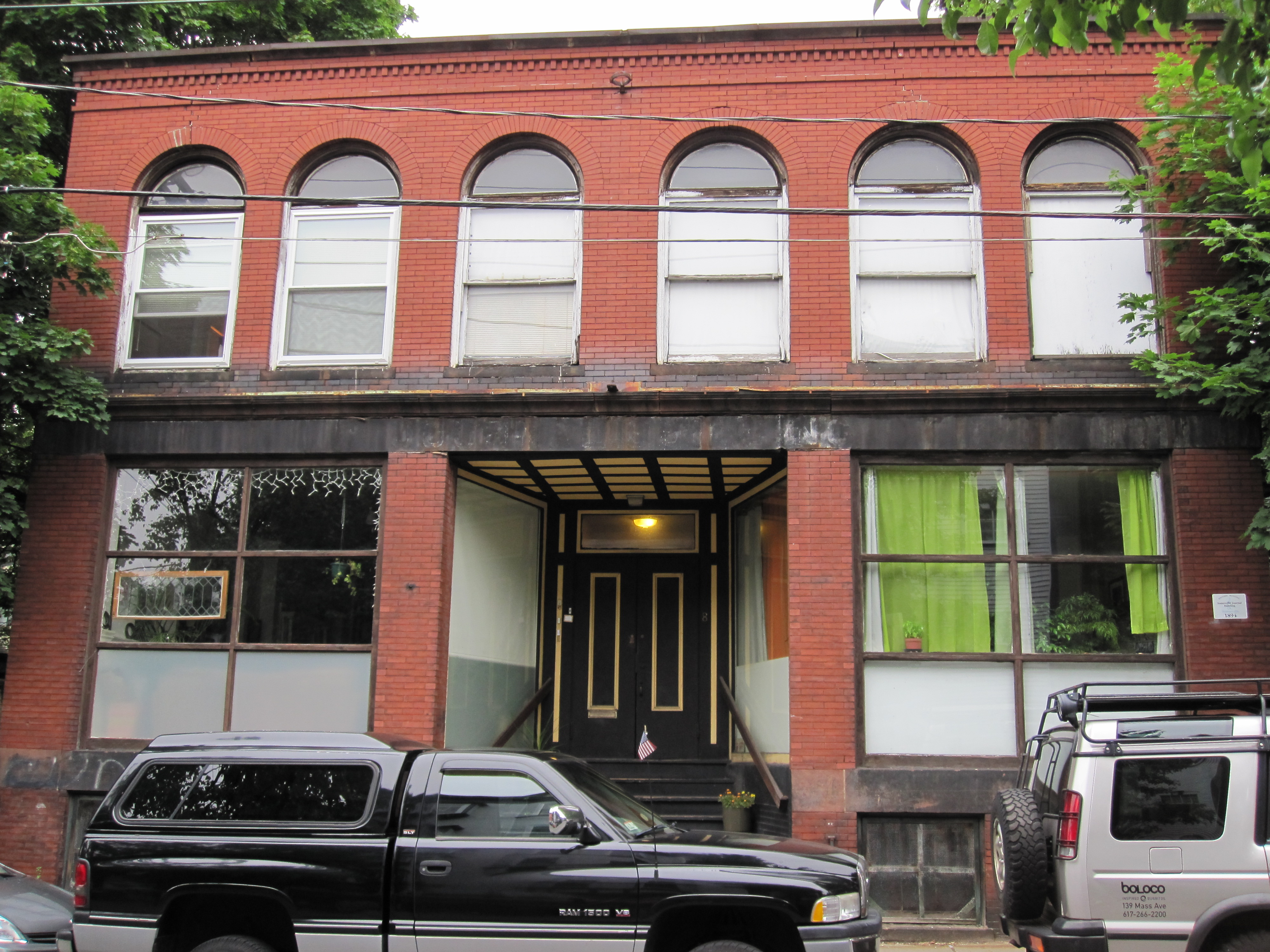
The historic Somerville Journal Building in 2009

The city is served by a number of news sources, including:

- Somerville Community Access Television
- The Boston Globe
- The Transcript & Journal
- The Somerville News Weekly (daily blog, despite name)
- The Somerville Times (newspaper)
- Cambridge Somerville Independent

The public radio show Living on Earth is recorded in Davis Square. In addition, Candlewick Press, a major children's book printing company, is operated in Somerville.

== Infrastructure ==
=== Transportation ===
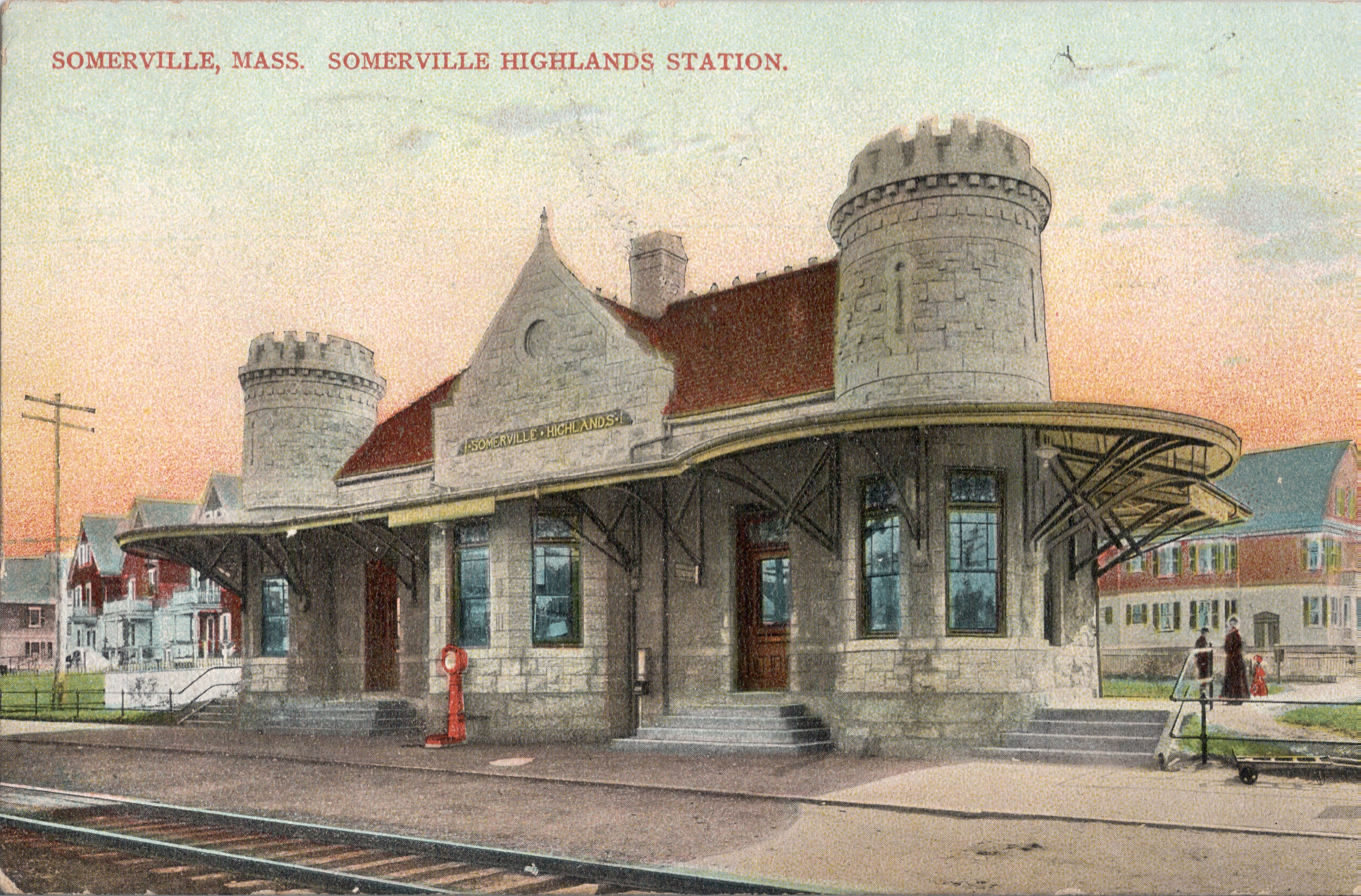
1907 postcard of Somerville Highlands Station

Route of the Green Line Extension

Somerville, originally built as a streetcar suburb of Boston, has a framework and layout ideal for public transit. Its traditionally designed neighborhoods, set among grid-like street networks, connect in a walkable, transit-friendly system. The City of Somerville is serviced by the Massachusetts Bay Transit Authority (MBTA) transit service.

==== Rail ====
Somerville is served by seven MBTA subway stations: Davis station on the Red Line, Assembly station on the Orange Line, and Union Square, East Somerville, Gilman Square, Magoun Square, and Ball Square on the Green Line. Davis opened in 1984, and Assembly in 2014. The Green Line stations opened in 2022 as part of the Green Line Extension, which the state was legally obligated to build since 1990. Both Porter Square station on the Red Line and Commuter Rail's Fitchburg Line in Cambridge and Sullivan Square station on the Orange Line in Boston's Charlestown neighborhood are located adjacent to Somerville along the border.

==== Road ====
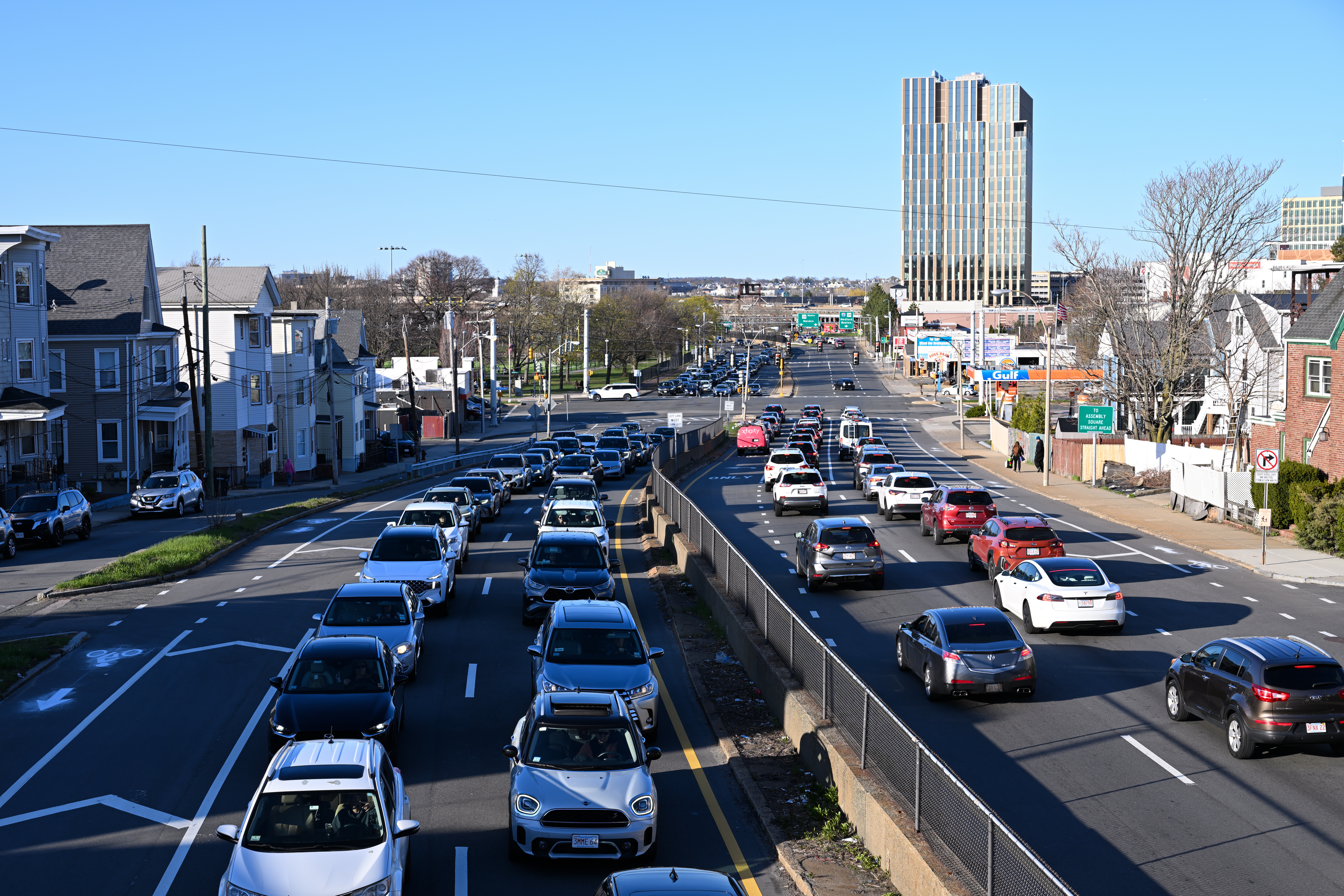
McGrath Highway (Route 28) in Winter Hill

Although only 43.6% of Somerville commuters drove alone to work in 2013, several major arteries pass through the city.

McGrath Highway is a major north–south route that represents the portion of Massachusetts Route 28 through the city of Somerville. McGrath is the continuation of Monsignor O'Brien Highway in Cambridge to the southeast and is known as the Fellsway north of the junction with Mystic Avenue and Interstate 93 in Medford. The highway has a long and complex history that hints to the changing nature of transportation throughout Somerville and the greater Boston metropolitan region. Originally constructed in 1928 to create a speedier connection for Route 28 between the Charles and Mystic Rivers, McGrath was elevated in the 1950s to further facilitate increased travel speed. The result was to cut off East Somerville and the Inner Belt District from Winter Hill and the rest of the city. When Route 28 was built, its primary purpose was to serve regional commuters traveling into Boston. However, it soon became clear that McGrath would need to be replaced by a larger and safer highway. The construction of the elevated Northern Expressway (Massachusetts), part of Interstate 93, was completed in the early 1970s and essentially rendered McGrath redundant. Today, the infrastructure of the two raised portions (the McCarthy Overpass, running from Somerville Avenue to Medford Street, and the Squires Bridge, running above the MBTA Fitchburg line near Twin City Plaza) are decaying and decrepit. In 2013, the Massachusetts Department of Transportation recommended that the McCarthy Overpass that crosses over several streets in Somerville be torn down, and proposed a boulevard-syle reconstruction with bike lanes and sidewalks for pedestrians. No date has been set for construction to begin.

Northern Expressway (Massachusetts) runs northwest and southeast through Somerville, separating Ten Hills and Assembly Square from the rest of the city. The massive elevated "Northern Expressway" was completed in the early 1970s and passes directly through Somerville running alongside and/or above Mystic Avenue (Massachusetts Route 38). Commonly referred to as the "upper and lower decks of 93", the Somerville-Charlestown section of the Northern Expressway carries three lanes of northbound traffic on the upper deck, and three lanes of southbound traffic on the lower deck. The highway also serves to cut off East Somerville from Charlestown.

As of 2010, snow removal from city streets and properties uses 42 pieces of equipment (including front-loaders and plows), about 10,000 short tons (9,100 t) of salt imported from Egypt, and a budget of $500,000. When the mayor declares a snow emergency that puts special parking restrictions into effect, in addition to electronic media and a press release, a switch at DPW headquarters on Franey Road activates 16 blue lights at major intersections to alert the public. Two crews of four people (with help from school janitors) clear sidewalks at 33 city-owned buildings. Excess snow in major pedestrian squares is removed and dumped on a vacant lot on Winter Hill.

==== Walking and cycling ====
Somerville is considered to be a highly walkable and bikeable city. In 2013, 7.8% of all commutes were made by bicycle, ranking Somerville fifth among U.S. cities for its share of bicycling. In 2013, 49.8% of Somerville commuters either walked, biked or used public transit. Somerville launched its first Bluebikes (originally Hubway) stations during the summer of 2012 and now hosts 21 stations.

The Somerville Community Path is a mixed-use path that runs along the old Boston and Lowell Railroad right-of-way from Davis Square across Somerville to the Cambridge border near Lechmere Square. Roughly 0.8 mi (1.3 km) of the path is finished and in use. The two finished segments feature pavement interspersed with brick and surrounded by grass, trees, pedestrian connections to nearby streets, and a community garden. The path is lit at night and snowplowed in the winter.

In 2013, the city broke ground on the first extension in almost twenty years that extended the path another 0.25 mi (0.40 km) east from its then-terminus at Cedar Street to Lowell Street.

==== Bus ====
Somerville has among the highest bus ridership in the Boston metro area. Nearly 40,000 passengers board the buses that pass through Somerville each day, and 15 MBTA bus routes operate in Somerville.

=== Emergency services ===
Somerville is protected by the 152 paid, professional firefighters of the city of Somerville Fire Department (SFD). The Somerville Fire Department currently operates out of five firehouses, located throughout the city, and operates five engine companies, three ladder companies, and one rescue company, commanded by an on-duty district chief and deputy chief each shift. Emergency Medical Services have been provided by Cataldo Ambulance Service, a private ambulance company, since it was founded as Somerville Ambulance Service in 1977.

=== Waste ===
The city provides contracted trash, single-stream recycling, yard waste, and hazardous waste pickup for residents in buildings with six or fewer units, and textile recycling pickup for all residents. Single-stream recycling materials are sent to the Casella Waste Systems processing facility in neighboring Charlestown.

== Notable people ==
- Gregory H. Adamian, was the President Emeritus and Chancellor of Bentley College, now Bentley University.
- James E. Barlow, civil engineer and city manager
- William Wallace Benjamin, Produce Merchant, President of the Boston Produce Society
- Léone Boudreau-Nelson, phonetician
- Robert A. Bruce, noted cardiologist and professor
- Mike Capuano, member of the House of Representatives and mayor of Somerville
- Richard Carle, actor
- Gosder Cherilus, National Football League player
- Neil Cicierega, musician, filmmaker, and animator
- Hal Clement, author
- Mildred Codding, medical illustrator
- Mike Colman, Ice hockey player for the 1991–1992 San Jose Sharks
- Hal Connolly, athlete, Olympic gold medalist in National Track and Field Hall of Fame
- Carolina Contreras, businesswoman
- George Dilboy, Medal of Honor recipient
- Henry F. Gilbert (1868–1928), music composer
- Nick Gomez, film director and writer
- Dianne Goolkasian Rahbee, prolific composer and pianist
- Henry Kimball Hadley, composer and conductor
- Henry Oliver Hansen, raised the first flag in the Battle of Iwo Jima
- Hazel Heald, pulp fiction writer who collaborated on several stories with H.P. Lovecraft
- Arthur Daniel Healey, Member of the U.S. House of Representatives
- Alan Hovhaness, composer
- James "Hutch" Hutchinson, studio musician and longtime Bonnie Raitt bassist
- Jake Kilrain, noted boxer
- Howie Long, NFL Hall of Famer, actor and sports analyst
- Martha Perry Lowe (1829–1902), poet, education activist
- Peter Mamakos (1918–2008), American film and television actor
- Patricia Head Minaldi, United States District Court judge
- Connie Morella, member of the House of Representatives
- Randall Munroe, cartoonist and writer
- Dave Ortega, comics artist
- Jack Parker, head coach of the Boston University Terriers hockey team, 1973–2013
- Bobby Pickett, composer of "Monster Mash"
- Harry Nelson Pillsbury, chess champion
- Alfred M. Pride, United States Navy admiral and pioneer naval aviator
- Archibald Query, inventor of Fluff
- Phil Reavis, competitor in the high jump at the 1956 Olympics
- Charles Revson, founder of Revlon
- Reverend Leonard Grimes, abolitionist
- Alex Rocco, actor
- Paul Ryan, born in Somerville; comic artist on Fantastic Four and The Phantom
- Daniel Alfred Sanborn, a surveyor who founded the Sanborn Map Company was born in Somerville
- John Shea, playwright
- Paul Sorrento, former Major League Baseball first baseman for four teams over eleven seasons
- Pie Traynor former Major League Baseball third baseman and member of the Major League Baseball Hall of Fame
- Daniel Chapman Stillson, inventor of the modern adjustable pipe wrench
- The Sturniolo Triplets, YouTubers and influencers
- David Foster Wallace, author
- Barbara Weeks, actress
- Winter Hill Gang, noted crime group
- Eliza Trask Hill, women's suffrage leader and prison reformer
- Aline van Barentzen, classical pianist

== Sister cities ==
As of May 19, 2026, Somerville's sister cities are:

- Gaeta, Italy
- Nordeste, Portugal
- Tiznit, Morocco
- Yucuaiquín, El Salvador

== Bibliography ==
- Drake, Samuel Adams. History of Middlesex County, Massachusetts, Volume 1 (A-H), Volume 2 (L-W) published 1879 and 1880. 572 and 505 pages. Somerville article by E.C.Booth in volume 2 pages 309–338. Somerville Fire Local 76 Somerville Police Department.
- Dutton, E.P. Chart of Boston Harbor and Massachusetts Bay with Map of Adjacent Country. Published 1867.
- Lehr, Dick; Gerard O'Neil (2000). Black Mass:The True Story of an Unholy Alliance Between the FBI and the Irish Mob. Public Affairs Press. pp. 8–84. ISBN 1-891620-40-1.
- Ostrander, Susan A. Citizenship and Governance in a Changing City: Somerville, MA (Temple University Press; 2013) 190 pages; study of tensions between immigrants and a new middle class in politics and community activism
- Sammarco, Anthony Michael (1997). Images of America: Somerville. Charleston, SC: Arcadia Publishing. ISBN 0-7385-1290-7.
- Samuels, Edward Augustus; Kimball, Henry Hastings, "Somerville, past and present: an illustrated historical souvenir", Boston : Samuels & Kimball, 1897
- Somerville, Arlington and Belmont Directory. 1869; 1873; 1876.
- Zellie, Carole (1990) [1982]. Beyond the Neck: The Architecture and Development of Somerville, Massachusetts. Cambridge, Mass.: Landscape Research. ISBN 0-7385-1290-7. OCLC 9213270.
- Wall & Gray. 1871 Atlas of Massachusetts. Map of Massachusetts. Map of Middlesex County.
