= East Somerville =

Neighborhood in Somerville, Massachusetts

Coordinates: 42.385°N 71.083°W

Location of East Somerville within the surrounding neighborhoods

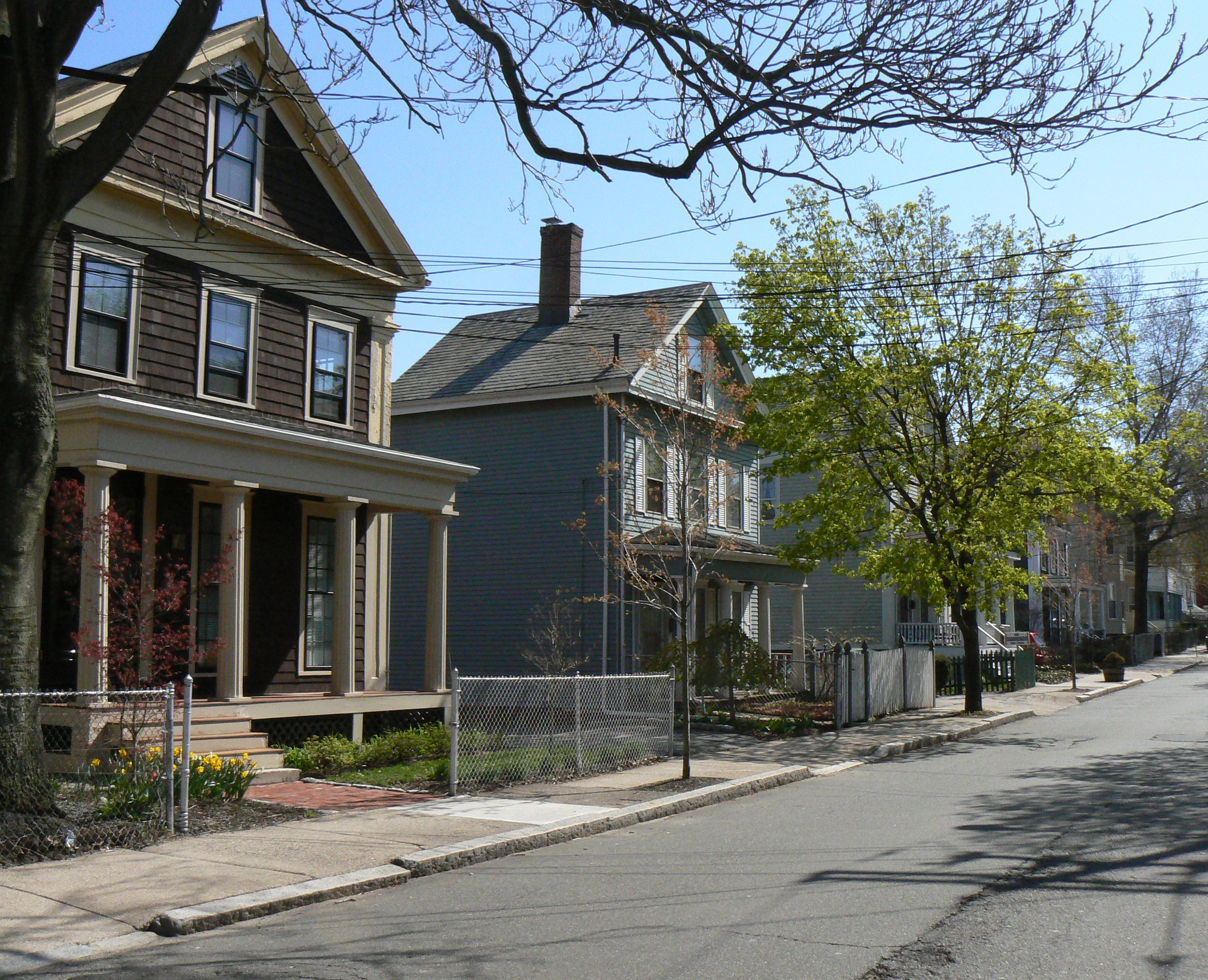
Mount Vernon Street

East Somerville is a neighborhood in the eastern part of the city of Somerville, United States. The community stretches east along Broadway, from Massachusetts Route 28 to Sullivan Square and Interstate 93 on the city line with the Boston neighborhood of Charlestown.

== History ==
Originally part of Charlestown, East Somerville is one of the oldest and most densely settled areas of Somerville. Initially a farming community where Charlestown residents pastured their cows, East Somerville later provided respite from the stresses of Boston and city life when roads, bridges and the arrival of the railroad made it an accessible and convenient location.

One of the most significant historic events featuring East Somerville was Paul Revere's "Midnight Ride" in 1775. On his journey, he rode his horse starting from Charlestown down Washington Street and up Crescent Street near the present-day Holiday Inn. Revere then rode directly onto Broadway, which brought him through Winter Hill to Medford. Every year on Patriots' Day, Somerville celebrates the historical ride through the town.

In the 19th century, East Somerville was distinguished by a drumlin, a long, oval mound of clay formed by glacial movement, called Mt. Benedict. Led by a group Roman Catholic Ursuline nuns, the primarily Italian-American Mt. Benedict community founded a convent and school in 1824 overlooking the Mystic River. The school began to enroll primarily the daughters of the Protestant (primarily liberal Unitarian) upper classes of Boston; by 1834 there were 47 students, only six of whom were Catholic. The lower classes of Boston, predominantly conservative Protestants, came to see the perceived union between two classes of people they distrusted as a threat. This inflamed religious tensions in the area, and anti-Catholic protestors in Boston began agitating and crossed into what was then part of Charlestown. During the ensuing conflict, a Protestant mob burned the convent to the ground on August 11, 1834. The land was later sold off and used to fill the nearby marshes. Today, some people still refer to the area north of Broadway as the ‘Nunnery Grounds’ alluding to this incident.

In the 1840s and 1850s, extensive development began with an urban model that called for narrow streets and small residential lots. The buildings from this era provide a distinguished collection of Greek Revival and Italianate style houses that are important to East Somerville. Many examples of this architecture can be found on upper Mt. Vernon, Mt. Pleasant and Perkins Streets. Pearl Street was developed in the 1870s and 1880s as a grand boulevard on the ridge overlooking Boston, with large single family homes that have since been subdivided.

East Somerville is also home to Mudflat, an arts center, the Somerville East Branch Library, and has quick access to the Assembly neighborhood, which is transforming into a busy and lively neighborhood, leaving behind its industrial past and giving way to an innovative future.

Since the 1890s, the area had been inhabited mostly by Irish, Italian, French Canadian and Greek immigrants. The first recent distinct ethnic group to come to Somerville were from Cape Verde, and began to arrive in the 1960s and 1970s. The Cape Verdean American population marked the beginning of a Portuguese language community that has increased ever since. Since the mid-1970s other groups have flocked to the area as well, including Haitians, Salvadorans, Brazilians and people from other Latin American countries. Attracted by the affordable housing, good schools and the proximity to Boston, East Somerville is today the densest and most diverse neighborhood in the city.

Most Salvadorans who reside in East Somerville come from Yucuaiquín, a municipality of La Unión Department of El Salvador. Yucuaiquinences came to East Somerville as early as the 1970s. The neighborhood was their destination of choice when they arrived in the United States, as a result of a friend or relative already living here. As of the early 2000s Yucuaiquinences continue to arrive in East Somerville, but at a much lower rate than earlier years. As Yucuaiquinence immigration into East Somerville decreased, immigration from other Salvadoran municipalities (notably La Palma, Chalatenango and Metapán) have increased.

== Transportation ==
The only rapid transit stop formally in East Somerville is East Somerville station, which opened in December 2022 as part of the Green Line Extension. Additionally, East Somerville is proximal to the MBTA Orange Line via Sullivan Square station just to the east while the Assembly Orange Line station lies immediately to the north in Assembly Square. MBTA bus service to East Somerville includes routes 80, 85, 90, and 91. These buses provide feeder service to the rapid transit lines and employment centers, but suffer from travel delays on congested local roads. Broadway, or East Broadway, is the neighborhood business corridor, with a variety of restaurants, boutiques, and shops. It is also a major thoroughfare and gives access to Route 28 and Interstate 93.
