= P.A.'s Lounge =

Music venue in Somerville, Massachusetts

Coordinates: 42°22′50.9″N 71°5′53.5″W

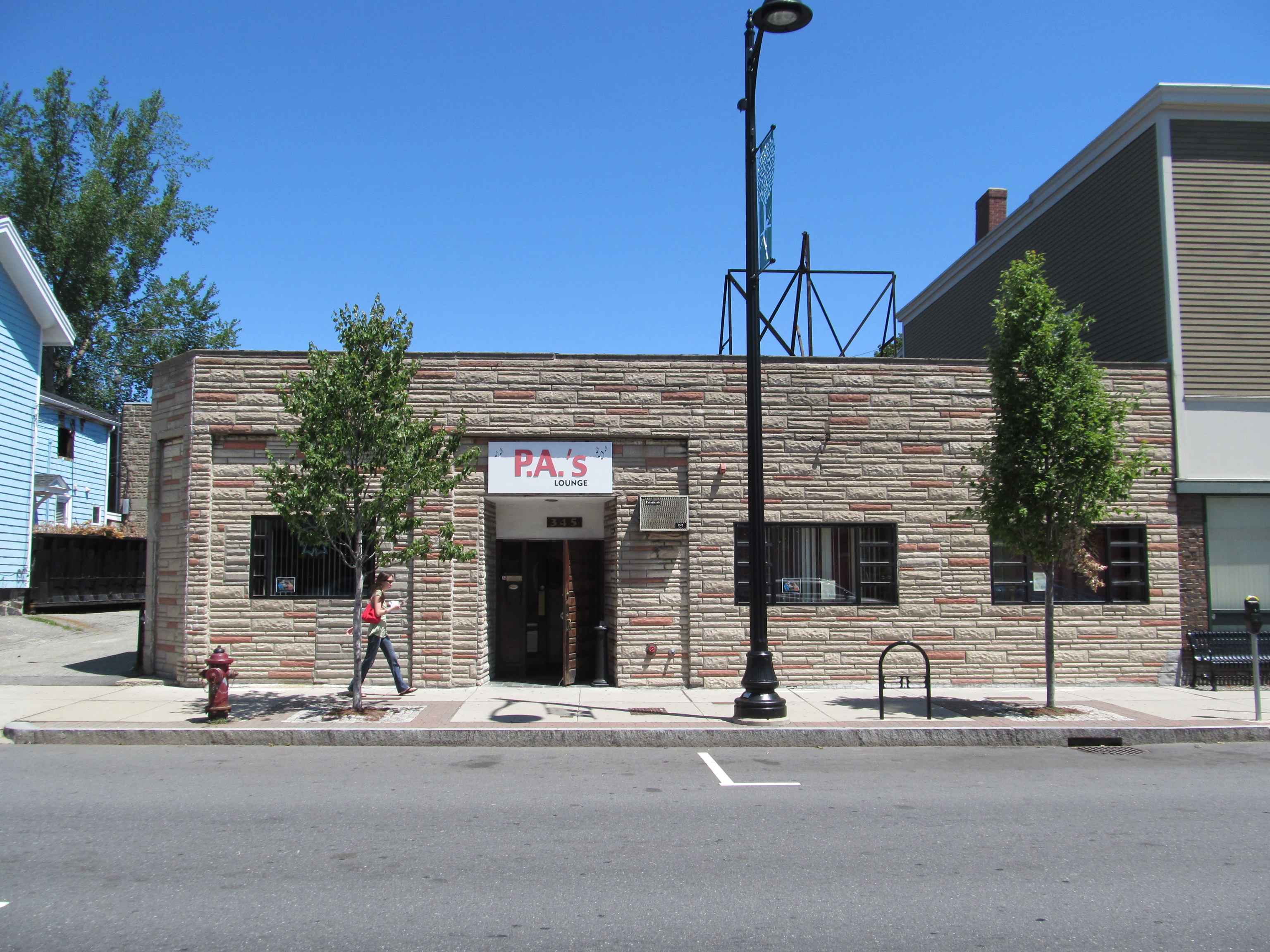
P.A.'s Lounge

P.A.'s Lounge is a live music venue in Somerville, Massachusetts, located near Union Square at 345 Somerville Ave. The venue's name derives from its original popularity as a club frequented by Portuguese immigrants (the letters P and A standing for Portuguese-American). P.A.'s then became a Portuguese seafood restaurant before re-opening as a live music venue and bar in the fall of 2002. In 2019, the owners rebranded the club's name to Union Tavern.

In its run as P.A.’s Lounge, it become known for appearances by such performers as Thurston Moore, Drug Rug, Mary Lou Lord, Erin Hasley, Steven Tyler, Steve Shelley, Iarla O'Halloran, Nobunny, Tunnel of Love, Glenn Jones, Eugene Mirman, Yar Laakso, Stephen Brodsky, Guy Paquin, Micah Blue Smaldone, JD Banjer, Jay Reatard, Colin Boyd, Casiotone For the Painfully Alone, Hannah Judson, Janey Tallarida, Elf Power, Jens Lekman and many others. While many of the acts booked could be described as "indie", the venue is host to a wide variety of performers and bands in an intimate, informal environment.
