= Evergage =

Evergage, Inc.
- Company type: Public
- Website type: Personalization
- Available in: English
- Headquarters: Somerville, Massachusetts, United States
- Area served: Worldwide
- Owner: Salesforce
- Key people: Karl Wirth (CEO); Greg Hinkle (CTO)
- Industry: Software as a Service, Website Optimization
- Website: www.evergage.com
- Launched: September 2010
- Current status: Active

Evergage was a cloud-based software that allowed users to collect, analyze, and respond to user behavior on their websites and web applications in real-time. In 2020, Evergage was acquired by Salesforce and was rebranded as Interaction Studio. The company positions itself as a "real-time personalization and customer data platform (CDP)".

The company was founded as Apptegic in 2010 by Karl Wirth and Greg Hinkle, who met while working at Red Hat. In May 2012, Evergage was a finalist in the TechCrunch Disrupt Startup Battlefield and, shortly thereafter, launched its cloud-based service. In August 2013, the company changed its name to Evergage.

In 2015, Evergage expanded its capabilities to include A/B and multivariate testing, as well as automated product and content recommendations driven by machine learning. The platform also added personalization support for mobile apps and, in 2016, open-time email personalization, and triggered email in 2017. Evergage acquired the e-commerce and email personalization provider MyBuys in 2018.

== See also ==
- Software as a Service
- Web analytics
- Customer data platform
