= Somerville Open Studios =

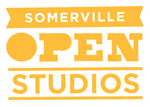
- Dates: 07–09 May 2021
- Locations: Somerville, Massachusetts
- Inaugurated: 1999
- Website: www.somervilleopenstudios.org

Somerville Open Studios (informally: SOS) is an annual event where the artists of Somerville, Massachusetts open their workspaces to the public. It is also the name of the 501(c)(3) nonprofit organization which oversees the event.

Somerville Open Studios is the largest Open Studio event in New England, and the third largest in America.

== History ==
Somerville Open Studios was begun by two local artists, Jonathan Derry and Laura Fayer. The first SOS (1999) featured over 80 artists exhibiting at 25 sites throughout the city. The event has been held every year since. Participation and attendance has grown every subsequent year.

Orange balloons have become a signature of SOS, where they mark an artist's studio which is open to be visited. Orange information kiosks have been introduced to provide more guidance. Several trolley-cars are also rented for the duration of event, on which volunteer guides direct people to workspaces and local landmarks.

In 2002 the organization introduced the Artist's Choice Exhibit at the Somerville Museum. In 2011 a Volunteer Art Show was initiated to reward those who volunteer at the event. In 2012 was the first runway-style SOS Fashion Show, along with an SOS Film Festival for video artists.

As of 2015, SOS allows people to visit the studios of painters, printers, glassblowers, welders, woodworkers, photographers, and all manner of visual, multimedia and performing artists. Participants have included Taza Chocolate, Vernon Street Studios, and Artisan's Asylum.

2020 saw the event on a virtual basis caused by the COVID-19 pandemic.

== Organization and governance ==
Somerville Open Studios has been a registered 5011(c)3 nonprofit organization since 2004. Its stated purposes is to provide "...access to artists and [expose] the public to the wide variety of art-making activities taking place in the city of Somerville, Massachusetts." The organization's yearly budget is appx. $34,000 (as of 2012).

Somerville Open Studios is managed by a board of directors composed primarily of participating artists. An executive committee is formed each year to organize the event, usually under the direction of one or more coordinators. This committee is assisted by approximately fifty dedicated volunteers and over one hundred on-site helpers during the event itself.
