= Arts on the Line =

Greater Boston subway public art program

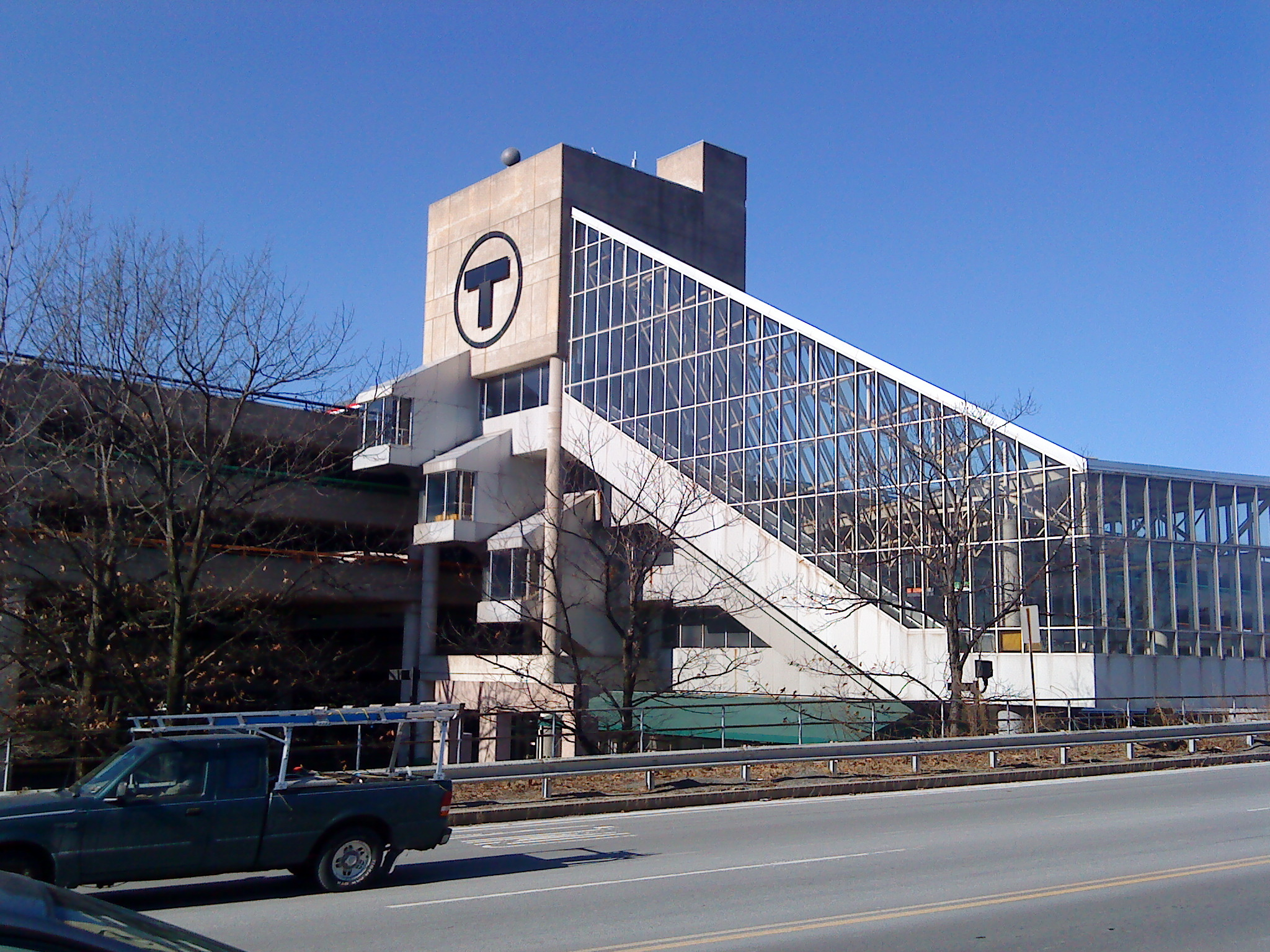
An exterior view of Alewife station, the location of six of the original twenty works commissioned by Arts on the Line

Arts on the Line was a program devised to bring art into the Massachusetts Bay Transportation Authority (MBTA) subway stations in the late 1970s and early 1980s. Arts on the Line was the first program of its kind in the United States and became the model for similar drives for art across the country. The first twenty artworks were completed in 1985 with a total cost of US$695,000, or one half of one percent of the total construction cost of the Red Line Northwest Extension, of which they were a part.

After the first 20 artworks were installed, Arts on the Line continued facilitating the installation of artwork in or around at least 12 more stations on the MBTA as well as undertaking a temporary art program for stations under renovation, known as "Artstops". Artworks are included in the six new Green Line Extension stations as well.

== History ==
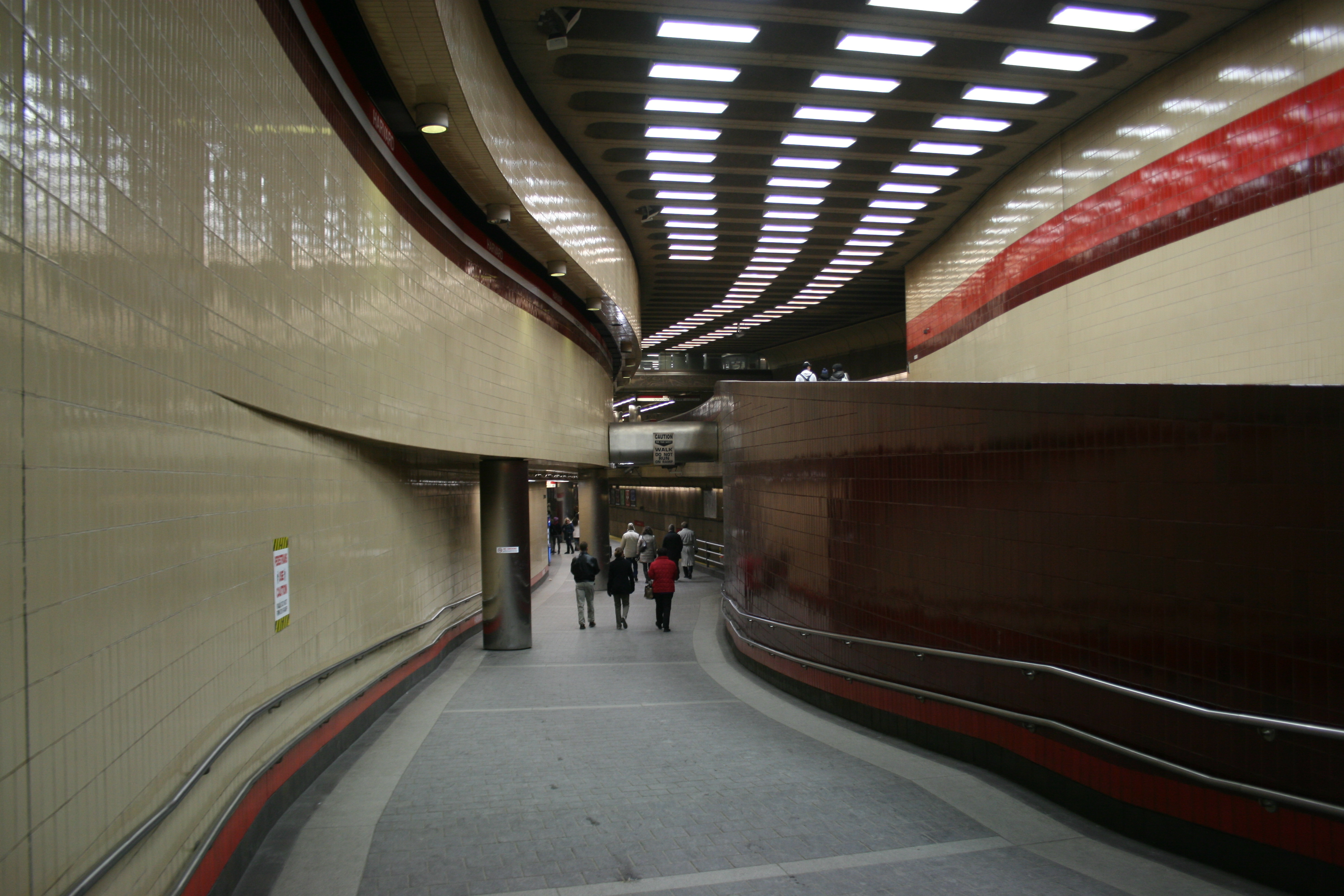
Interior of Harvard station

In 1964, the MBTA was created as the successor to the Metropolitan Transit Authority. The purpose of the MBTA was to consolidate transit systems in greater Boston.

The first permanent public artworks on the MBTA were added in 1967. (A temporary exhibition had been held in the Winter Street Concourse in 1960.)

Before Arts on the Line was implemented, the MBTA did not have a comprehensive or formal arts program. The process for choosing station art was closed, with no public announcement or solicitation to local artists, creating some resentment within the arts community. Artists that were chosen to install works in stations often had disputes with contracts and contractors, and often had problems just getting paid by the MBTA.

Arts on the Line began with the planning of the Red Line Northwest Extension. Four stations, Harvard, Porter, Davis, and Alewife, were created or remodeled as a part of this mass transit project. In 1977, the MBTA received a $45,000 grant from the Federal Government's Urban Mass Transportation Administration to create a program to install artworks into the new stations, and in 1978 the MBTA and the Cambridge Arts Council (CAC) joined in a partnership to reach this goal.

The Arts on the Line program was developed solely by the CAC and was administered by them as well. Meant to be a response to art installations in subway systems such as the Stockholm Metro, Paris Métro, Montreal Metro, and Moscow Metro, the new Arts on the Line program became the United States' first arts in transit program, and was to be a "pilot for similar projects in other U.S. cities".

=== Selection process ===
From 1979-1980, the Cambridge Arts Council, which was charged with choosing the artworks, went through the artist selection process and selected twenty artworks, five for each station. To select the works, an "arts committee" was formed for each of the stations, and an open call for artists was publicized; over 650 artists submitted proposals.

Each committee included at least one of each of MBTA representatives, community development representatives, members of local historical societies, local residents, business representatives, and an arts administrator. Each committee had two subgroups, an advisory board and an art panel. The advisory board collected information about the future station and its surroundings. This included design of the station, history of the area, and a profile of future station users. This information was passed along to the art panel, composed of three people: an artist, an art professional from outside of Massachusetts, and someone who lived near the future station. This panel chose the artworks.

A seven-step process was devised to create a "systematic selection process which would, nevertheless, provide flexibility". After meetings of the arts committee, the art panel held meetings with the MBTA and architect, and chose a method for artist selection (open or limited competition, invitation, or purchase). Then artists developed and presented proposals, the committee discussed them, and the panel made its decision.

After the placement of 20 artworks in the four stations of the Northwest Extension, the program was expanded to include the creation of artworks in or around at least 12 more stations on the MBTA.

=== Installation ===
In 1985, the first 20 artworks installed under the Arts on the Line program were unveiled. These works comprised the largest collection of art in a United States transit setting, at that time. The total cost of the artworks was $695,000, or one half of one percent of the total construction cost of the Red Line Extension, and was funded partially by a $70,000 National Endowment for the Arts grant. In 1989, the program was awarded a Federal Design Achievement Award by the National Endowment for the Arts, which stated that the project "demonstrates how much art can enrich the everyday experience of the public environment".

The works were almost exclusively made with durable materials (stone, bronze, brick, etc.), and many were placed so that it was physically impossible to reach them without assistance. This was to avoid normal wear and tear as well as vandalism. The works are designed to last 75 years per City of Cambridge standards for public art.

=== Later works ===
After completing the installation of artwork on the Red Line Extension, the program was continued in other forms. In 1986, Arts on the Line began a program titled "ArtStops" with the goal of providing artwork to stations under renovation as a way to distract riders from the mess and confusion of the renovation work. The MBTA installed temporary galleries in six subway stations, including Central, Park Street, Kendall/MIT, Washington Street, and Essex (Chinatown) stations, which were all undergoing renovations in the mid-80s. These galleries hosted temporary works for 18 months, and each temporary gallery was allotted US$20,000 to spend on art. In total 21 artists were chosen, each one being given a $3500 stipend to develop and create up to three projects for the station. Forty works were displayed in 1986, with 19 more in 1987. A subway rider at Harvard station stated, "It's worth coming down to the T just for the art". Permanent works were also placed in the renovated stations, including Kendall Band at Kendall/MIT.

By the 1990s, the project was stalled: new artworks were not being added, while kinetic works like Kendall Band were no longer functional. The MBTA was criticized by artists and conservators for failing to maintain artworks: burnt-out light fixtures in Blue Sky on the Red Line and stolen pieces of Glove Cycle were not replaced, Gift of the Wind was not lubricated, and Paul Matisse had to repair Kendall Band himself even though his contract specified that the MBTA would conduct repairs. In 2001, the MBTA began a $2.3 million federally-funded program to install ten new works and restore 21 of the 72 existing pieces. The centerpiece of the program was Totems of Light, a pair of stained glass windows at the rebuilt Airport station. Public art on the Green Line Extension was cut during cost-cutting in 2015, but later re-added.

=== Removal of artworks ===
The Lights at the End of the Tunnel, a large reflective mobile by William Wainwright in the Porter Square station mezzanine, was removed in 1993 due to a lead weight that fell off.

Omphalos, a large outdoors public art sculpture by Dimitri Hadzi, was located at Harvard Square station at the center of a busy intersection. Structural elements of the sculpture slowly deteriorated unnoticed, until a 1,000-pound (450 kg) piece fell off without warning. Short of funds and faced with an expensive repair bill, the MBTA considered options to either move or destroy the artwork in August 2013. By December 2013, the sculpture had been removed, and its ownership had been transferred to a private developer of housing in Rockport, Massachusetts. The developer planned to restore and re-install it on a public harbor walk near a new development in Pigeon Cove, with the approval of the artist's widow.

== Red Line Northwest Extension artworks ==
The following is a list of the first 20 artworks created for Arts on the Line, which were all installed along the Red Line Northwest Extension.

Title	Image	Artist	Station	Location	Year	Medium	Notes	Ref.
Untitled		Richard Fleischner	Alewife	Street level	1985	Granite, pavers, plantings	A 3-acre (12,000 m^{2}) large environmental work containing an artificial pond and large granite blocks	
Untitled		David Davison	Alewife	Ramp to busway	1984	Porcelain tiles	200 feet (61 m) of abstractly painted, light blue tiles arranged in various ways	
Alewife Cows		Joel Janowitz	Alewife	Busway (north wall)	1985	Paint on steel panels	A mural of a false exit to the bus terminal with cows grazing in a pasture outside.	
Untitled (Kiss and Ride)		William Keyser, Jr.	Alewife	Parking garage	1984	Maple, stainless steel	Two sculptural benches	
The End of the Red Line		Alejandro and Moira Sina	Alewife	Above the northern track	1984	Neon	800 illuminated red neon tubes suspended from wires attached to the ceiling above the subway tracks. The intensity of the light is varied gradually over time.	
Untitled		Nancy Webb	Alewife	Lobby floor	1984	Bronze tiles	100 6-inch (15 cm) square tiles scattered throughout the station lobby with low relief images of plants and animals found in the Alewife Brook Reservation	
Ten Figures		James Tyler	Davis	Street level		Masonry	Life-size human figures created out of cement, placed in areas around Davis Square	
Children's Tile Mural		Jack Gregory and Joan Wye	Davis	Mezzanine wall		Tile	Many tiles created by children placed on the brick wall of the station mezzanine	
Poetry		Richard C. Shaner, Elizabeth Bishop, Sam Walter Foss, Erica Funkhouser, E.J. Graff, Denise Levertov, James More, Peter Payack, Anna M. Warrock, Emily Dickinson, and Walt Whitman	Davis	Platform level (floor and walls)		Poetry	Lines of poems are embedded into bricks on the station platform walls	
Sculpture with a D		Sam Gilliam	Davis	Wall above northbound track		Painted aluminum	A large scale, brightly colored, abstract work	
Gift of the Wind		Susumu Shingu	Porter	Street level	1983	Steel, aluminum	A 46-foot (14 m) tall kinetic sculpture with three large red "wings" that move in response to the wind	
Ondas		Carlos Dorrien	Porter	Headhouse	1983	Granite	A 24-foot (7.3 m) tall piece of undulating granite affixed to the station wall both inside the station and outside	
Glove Cycle		Mags Harries	Porter	Escalator and platform level	1984	Bronze	A large number of bronze gloves of varying types and sizes scattered inside the station, including alongside the escalator	
Untitled		William Reimann	Porter	Street level	1983	Granite	Six granite bollards sandblasted with designs representing ethnic groups who live in the Porter Square area.	
Porter Square Megaliths		David Phillips	Porter	Street level	1984	Field stone, bronze, pavers	Four boulders with large "slices" removed and replaced with bronze casts of the missing pieces	
The Lights at the End of the Tunnel †		William Wainwright	Porter	Mezzanine (hung from ceiling)	1984	Aluminum and mylar	A large scale reflective mobile located in the station's mezzanine. (Removed in 1993 after a lead weight fell off.)	
Gateway to Knowledge		Ann Norton	Harvard	Brattle Square	1983	Brick	A 20-foot-6-inch (6.25 m) high brick structure divided vertically down the center by a gap but still attached at the top. One half is slightly forward of the other.	
New England Decorative Art		Joyce Kozloff	Harvard	Wall above busway ramp	1985	Ceramic tile	An 83-foot (25 m) long mosaic split up into 8 sections, each resembling a quilt	
Omphalos †		Dimitri Hadzi	Harvard	Harvard Square	1985	Granite	A grouping of pillars holding up various shapes that intersect at odd angles. Many different types and polishes of granite are used. (Removed in 2013, after a heavy stone fell due to corrosion of its supports)	
Blue Sky on the Red Line		György Kepes	Harvard	Wall of the upper busway	1985	Stained glass	A large, backlit stained glass wall composed of mostly blue glass with the exception of a red band that runs the length of the work. It was unlit for years until the original fluorescent lamps were replaced with LEDs in 2019.	

† This artwork is no longer installed at the station
