= Wall Cycle to Ocotillo =

Public art installation in Phoenix, Arizona

- Artist: Mags Harries and Lajos Héder
- Year: 1992
- Medium: Sculpture
- Location: Phoenix, Arizona

Wall Cycle to Ocotillo, often called the Squaw Peak Pots, is a public art installation in Phoenix, Arizona that consists of over 20 sculptures in various locations in central Phoenix. The sculptures are in the form of vessels and jars and were created by artists Mags Harries and Lajos Héder. The piece was installed in January 1992. Originally consisting of 35 sculptures at 20 locations, several pieces atop the SR-51 wall were removed in 2004 to allow for the noise barrier wall to be heightened; more than half of the original sculptures remain in place throughout central Phoenix, including six that are visible to motorists on the SR-51.

Wall Cycle to Ocotillo was among the first projects initiated by the newly formed Phoenix Arts Commission. Established in 1986, the Phoenix Arts Commission chose to focus on creating art around the city of Phoenix rather than concentrating art in the downtown area, working with artists in collaboration with engineers to implement art and design in the city's expanding infrastructure. The project cost $475,000 which was funded by the $10 million of voter-approved bond money designated for public art in 1986.

The piece was controversial, with many criticizing the art's cost, whimsical design, and creation by two out-of-state artists. The piece received international media attention. Many residents, and the mayor of Phoenix Phil Johnson, called for the removal of the sculptures. The following year Wall Cycle to Ocotillo was voted the second favorite sculpture in Phoenix.

== Background ==
The philosophy of the staff [in the 1980s] was really that quality and design and art was for everybody in the city. It wasn't just for the cognoscenti. And we took that to heart. [...] We decided very early on that the only way that we could make an impact is if we involved artists with the actual building and designing of the city.

— Gretchen Freeman, Phoenix's first Public Art Program Director, speaking in 2015

Phoenix experienced a large population growth after World War II. From 1940 to 1980 the city's population grew by eleven-fold, growing from a population of 65,414 in 1940 to 789,704 in 1980.

In 1984 Phoenix mayor Terry Goddard became interested in finding a way for the city of Phoenix to better support the arts, which led to the Phoenix Arts Commission being established in 1985. In 1986 the Phoenix City Council passed a percent for art ordinance, setting aside one percent of construction budgets for public art.

In 1988 voters approved a $1 billion bond for the City of Phoenix, with 1% of the budget, $10 million, designated for public art. The city chose to fund public art implementation throughout the city rather than focusing its efforts on the downtown area.

The City of Phoenix commissioned architect William Morrish, urban designer Catherine Brown, and artist Grover Mouton to put together a master plan. The plan, titled "Public Art Plan for Phoenix: Ideas and Visions," was adopted by the City Council in 1988.

The plan suggested implementing art alongside the newly constructed SR-51 freeway, which was then called the Squaw Peak Parkway. According to Robert Schultz of the City of Phoenix, "[The SR-51's] construction, because it took place during the 1980s and 1990s, afforded the newly formed Phoenix Arts Commission a chance to site many innovative projects along a well-used public corridor."

The commission's first SR-51 project was Our Shared Environment, which was integrated into the design of the Thomas Road freeway overpass. Wall Cycle to Ocotillo was the second project.

== Creation ==
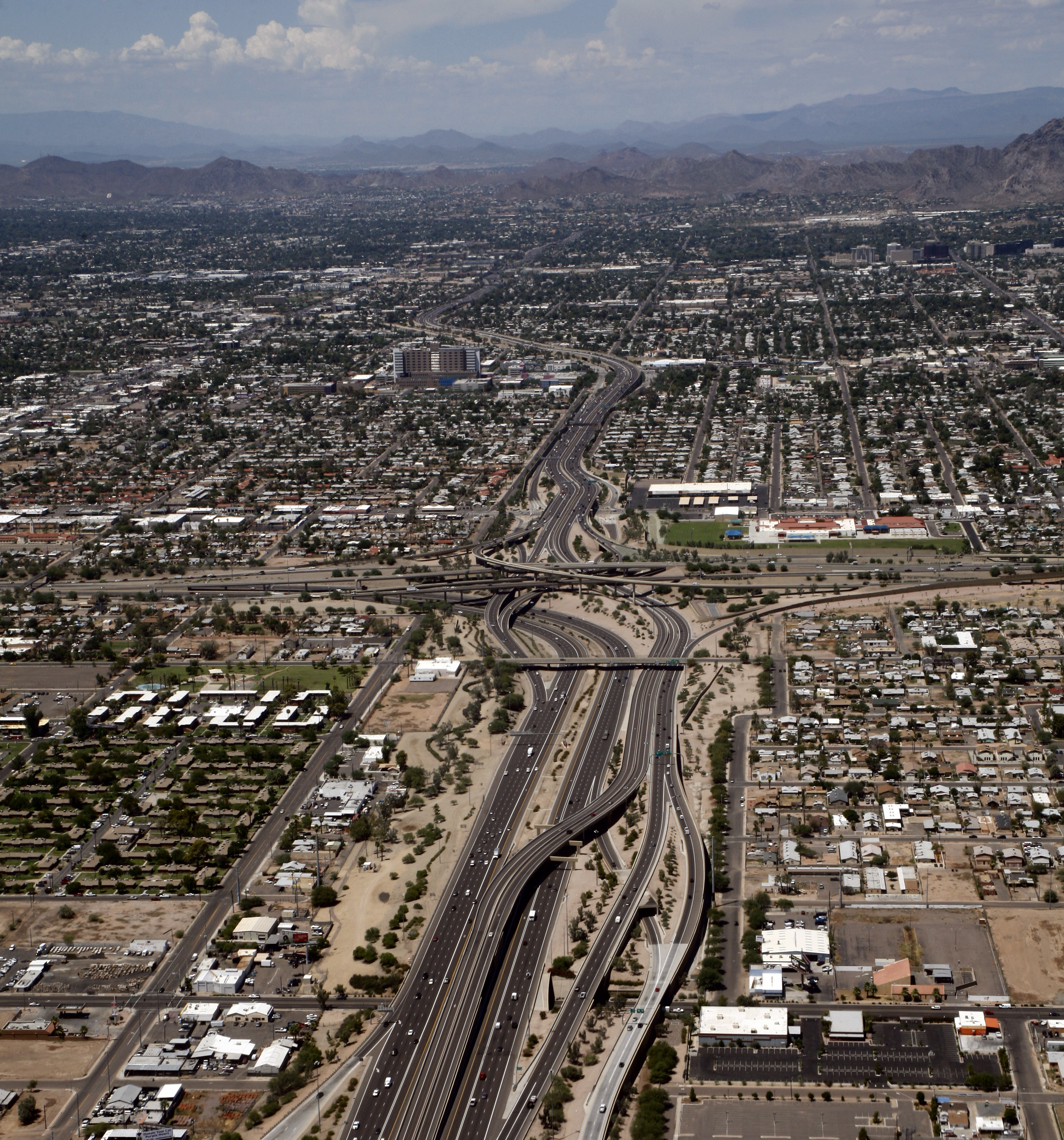
The construction of the SR-51 cut through existing neighborhoods in Central Phoenix

According to Phoenix Arts Commission executive director Deborah Whitehurst, the sculptures were intended primarily for the residents of the neighborhood around the SR-51, not the motorists on the SR-51. Whitehurst said that the art was designed to "enhance the walls along the freeway wall" and to act as a bridge between the neighborhood and the large structure of the freeway.

Everybody has teapots, dishes, vases. Everybody has that in their home. We wanted the theme of the home, but with the scale of the freeway. This is a whimsical piece.

— Phoenix Arts Commission director Deborah Whitehurst in 1992

Because of this, the art work was inspired by the neighborhood and the majority of the 35 sculptures were placed on the neighborhood side of the freeway walls. Many of the pieces originally incorporated landscaping in their designs. All pieces were made uniquely for their site, for example the hummingbird garden vessel was designed because of a nearby resident who kept an aviary.

The city hired husband and wife team, Massachusetts-based artist Mags Harries and architect Lajos Héder, for the project. Harries and Heder sought inspiration by biking through the neighborhoods beside the freeway and speaking with residents. They were intrigued by the sight of pots displayed on living room shelves during their visits, and were also aware of the history of the Native American pottery in the Southwestern United States.

Some of the sculptures were installed atop the freeway wall itself and were visible to motorists. Many Phoenicians were not aware of the majority of the sculptures that were not visible from the freeway.

The art was installed in the end of January in 1992.

== Sculptures ==
External videos
- 1993 student film mockumentary showcasing the sculptures (YouTube)

The 35 sculptures ranged from 2 to 15 feet in height. They are polychrome sculptures, many of which also featured landscaped environments.

=== Acoustic Vessels ===
Four acoustic water vessels were placed along the Arizona Canal and Grand Canal near the freeway. Two were placed along the Arizona Canal, and two along the Grand Canal. By 2021 only one vessel at each Canal remained. The designs were created by Hopi artist and silversmith Howard Sice. When they were introduced, the acoustic vessels contained bubbling water that spread sound and a mist over the bench area.

=== Guardian Vessels ===
Three guardian vessels are placed into the freeway wall at places were neighborhood streets were cut off by the construction of the SR-51. Each bear the name of the street they are located on: The Glenrosa Guardian Vessel on Glenrosa Avenue, the Palm Guardian Vessel on Palm Lane, and the Brill Guardian Vessel on Brill Street.

All three guardian vessels have portions visible to motorists from the freeway. The most visible is the Glenrosa Guardian Vessel whose handle can be seen prominently in the freeway wall between Indian School and Camelback. It has been referred to by some motorists as a "giant teapot."

=== Water Clock Vessels ===
Two water clock vessels are placed into the side of the east wall of the SR-51. Originally built atop the freeway wall, the vessels were left in place during the 2004 wall expansion; the addition to the freeway wall was built around the sculptures. A portion of both vessels can be seen by motorists on the SR-51.

=== Gazebos ===
Three gazebos were built along the bike paths on the neighborhood side of the barrier wall.

Teapot Gazebo is a 14-foot free-standing work constructed of lime green metal, with actual teapot pieces inlaid in its terrazzo floor. Dave Siebert of the Arizona Republic called the work "the most interesting of the pieces."

Moroccan Gazebo is built into the freeway wall and can be seen along the bike path on the east side of the SR-51. It is located feet away from Giant Car Container Vessel.

African Gazebo is located on the west side of the SR-51; it is built into the barrier wall.

=== Hummingbird Garden Vessel ===
The artists referred to this piece as a "mini-park" and a "small sanctuary for hummingbirds."

=== Giant Vessels ===
Three of the largest pieces are called "giant vessels"; all are located on the neighborhood side of the freeway wall.

Giant Octopus Vessel and Fishbowl is a two-part work consisting of a giant vessel and an accompanying shallow pool, both painted with aquatic designs.

Giant Sunflower Vessel is located along a bike path east of the SR-51.

Giant Car Container Vessel is located along another bike path east of the SR-51. It is visible to motorists on Osborn Road, and located within view of sculpture Moroccan Gazebo.

=== Imagery Wall ===
Located at 20th St and Oak on the neighborhood side of the wall, five sculptures are located on a section of the freeway barrier called the "Imagery Wall." Three sculptures called Aspirin Bottle, Pitcher, and Coffee Cup are placed inside indentations within the wall. On a shelf on the wall is another sculpture called Skeleton Face Vessel. The sculpture called Glass Pitcher is inside an asymmetrical indentation in the wall. It can be seen on both sides of the freeway wall.

== Reception ==
=== 1992 criticism ===
Within the first year of the art's installation the work was criticized by local residents, international media, and the mayor of Phoenix. Critics of Wall Cycle to Ocotillo took issue with the project's $474,000 cost, its unusual design, and the hiring of out-of-state artists for its creation.

On February 2, 1992, a few days after the art's installation, Arizona Republic columnist E.J Montini criticized the art in a piece titled "$500,000 buys some cracked pots for parkway". In the piece Montini joked that National Geographic was making a documentary about the pots called "Chamber Pots of the Gods." The following day a gold spray-painted toilet was left atop the parkway wall with a copy of Monitini's article inside.

City workers removed the golden toilet, stating that it was a safety hazard for motorists. Also removed were a few old trash cans and flower pots that had also been placed upon the wall in an apparent protest against the new art installation. Two weeks later vandals lassoed a rope around the 3-foot tall crystal vase sculpture, breaking off the top half of the work. Artists spent two months repairing the sculpture and it was returned to its place atop the freeway wall. Less than two months later, in June 1992, the vase sculpture was again smashed by vandals. It was again repaired by the artists.

The pots received international media attention. The National Enquirer referred to them as "ugly urns." They were parodied in a cartoon Ripley's Believe It or Not! They received media coverage in Japan.

The mayor of Phoenix, Paul Johnson, publicly criticized the sculptures and called for their removal. The week after its installation Johnson issued a memo to the City Council calling the price of the art work "outrageous" in difficult economic times. Johnson had been a member of the City Council in 1990 when it had approved the project's funding. He was unable to remove the sculptures because of a contract clause stating that the art could not be removed within the first five years.

=== Praise ===
In 1993 Wall Cycle to Ocotillo was voted Phoenix's second-favorite work of art. In 1994 Wall Cycle to Ocotillo was one of ten public artworks featured in a Smithsonian video titled "Public Sculpture America's Legacy".

In a 2008 piece about Wall Cycle to Ocotillo, Kathleen Vanesian of Phoenix New Times praised the sculptures, writing "Those pots gave me a flicker of hope that Phoenix wasn't as culturally desiccated as I'd thought — that someone here in this vale of triple-digit temperatures and double-digit I.Q.'s actually had a pretty artfully honed sense of humor."

== Removal of wall pieces ==
In the early 2000s an $80 million project to expand the SR- 51 took place. An HOV lane was added, which required a higher noise barrier wall to lessen the noise to the surrounding neighborhoods. Twelve of the sculptures were removed during the project, and the others were protected in place during the construction.

The three guardian vessels and the two water clock vessels remained in place and the noise barrier wall was added around the sculptures. Several of the pieces that had been places atop the wall were put into storage were not reinstalled.

Per an agreement with the Arizona Department of Transportation, the city of Phoenix paid $50,000 to remove and store the sculptures.

== List of sculptures ==
Image	Title	Type	Location	Status
	Teapot Gazebo	Gazebo	1769 E Tuckey Ln, Phoenix, AZ 85016	Not visible from freeway
	Moroccan Gazebo	Gazebo	1823 E Mitchell Dr, Phoenix, AZ 85016	Not visible from freeway
	African Gazebo	Gazebo	1730 E Montecito Ave, Phoenix, AZ 85016	Not visible from freeway
	Hummingbird Garden Vessel	Garden Vessel	4001 N 18th St, Phoenix, AZ 85016	Not visible from freeway
	Glenrosa Guardian Vessel	Guardian Vessel	4239 N 18th St, Phoenix, AZ 85016	Visible from freeway
	Palm Guardian Vessel	Guardian Vessel	2024 E Palm Ln, Phoenix, AZ 85006	Visible from freeway
	Brill Guardian Vessel	Guardian Vessel	1941 E Brill St, Phoenix, AZ 85006	Visible from freeway
	Giant Car Container Vessel	Giant Vessel	1838 E Osborn Rd, Phoenix, AZ 85016	Not visible from freeway
	Giant Sunflower Vessel	Giant Vessel	2000 East Virginia Avenue, Phoenix, AZ	Not visible from freeway
	Giant Octopus Vessel and Fishbowl	Giant Vessel	1802 E Claremont St, Phoenix, AZ 85016	Not visible from freeway
	Red Water Clock Vessel	Water Clock Vessel	1738 E Montebello Ave, Phoenix, AZ 85016	Visible from freeway
	Black Water Clock Vessel	Water Clock Vessel	1749 E Medlock Dr, Phoenix, AZ 85016	Visible from freeway
	Glass Pitcher	Imagery Wall Component	2320 N 20th St, Phoenix, AZ 85006	Visible from freeway
	Skeleton Face Vessel	Imagery Wall Component	2320 N 20th St, Phoenix, AZ 85006	Not visible from freeway
	Aspirin Bottle	Imagery Wall Component	2320 N 20th St, Phoenix, AZ 85006	Not visible from freeway
	Coffee Cup	Imagery Wall Component	2320 N 20th St, Phoenix, AZ 85006	Not visible from freeway
	Pitcher	Imagery Wall Component	2320 N 20th St, Phoenix, AZ 85006	Not visible from freeway
	Acoustic Vessel 1	Acoustic Vessel	Arizona Canal	Not visible from freeway
	Acoustic Vessel 2	Acoustic Vessel	Arizona Canal	Not visible from freeway
	Acoustic Vessel 3	Acoustic Vessel	Grand Canal	Not visible from freeway
	Acoustic Vessel 4	Acoustic Vessel	Grand Canal	Not visible from freeway
	Giant Planter Bowl	Bowl	1818 E Maryland Ave, Phoenix, AZ 85016	Not visible from freeway
	Small Planter Bowl	Bowl	1737 E Sierra Vista Dr, Phoenix, AZ 85016	Not visible from freeway
	Plate	Wall top piece		In storage
	Coffee Pot	Wall top piece		In storage
	Glass Vase	Wall top piece		In storage
	Split Native American pot	Wall top piece		In storage
	Split Serving Dish	Wall top piece		In storage
	Round Metallic Vase	Wall top piece		In storage
