= Arizona Falls =

Waterfall, park, and powerplant in Phoenix, Arizona

- G.R. Herberger Park
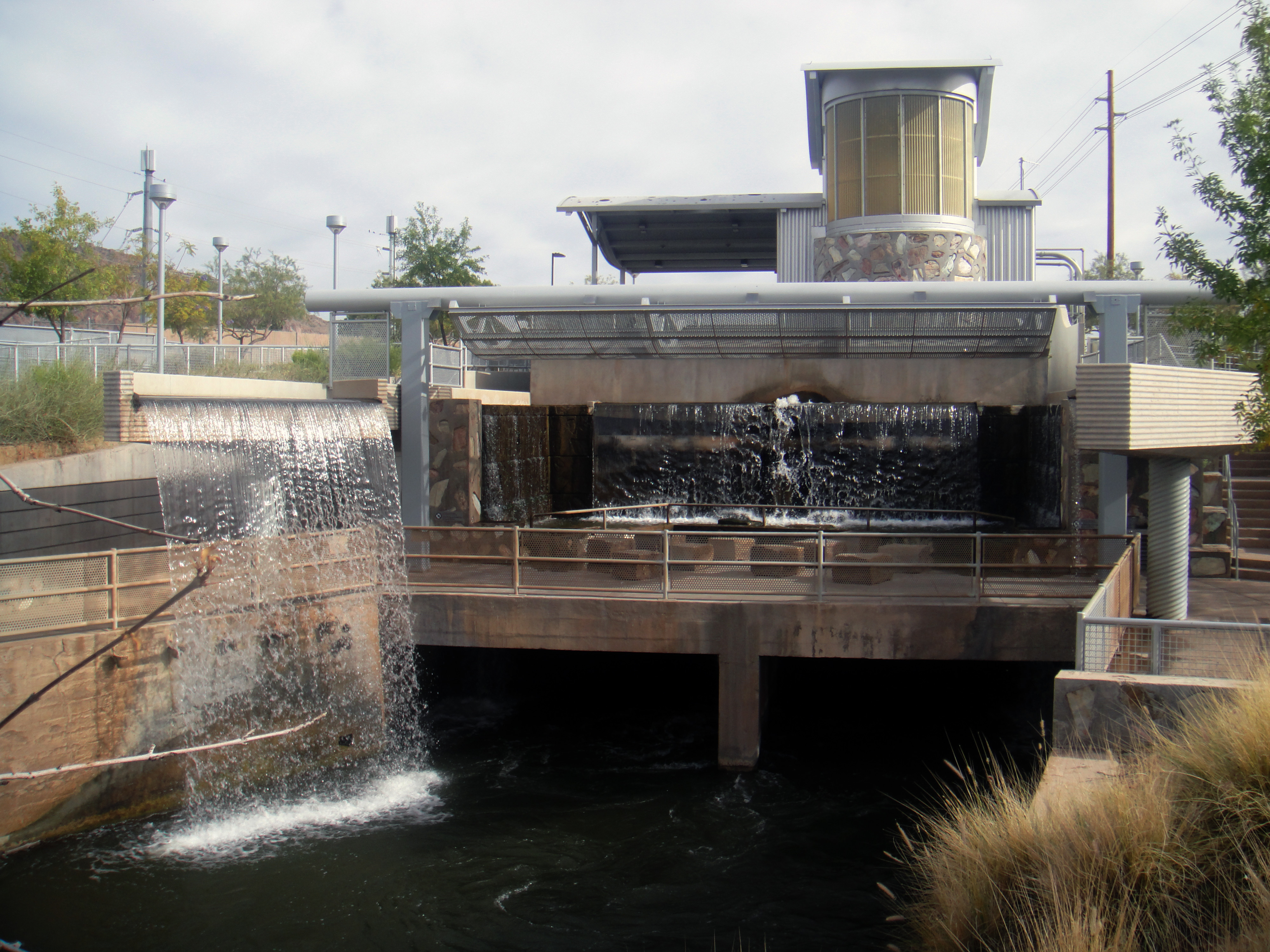
- Interactive map of Arizona Falls
- Location: 5802 E Indian School Rd, Phoenix, Arizona, U.S.
- Coordinates: 33.4899°N 111.9589°W
- Open: 24 hours (parking open 5am–10pm)
- Interactive map of Arizona Falls
- Purpose: Power
- Status: Operational
- Construction began: 1901
- Opening date: 1903, rebuilt 2003
- Owner: Salt River Project

Dam and spillways
- Impounds: Arizona Canal
- Height (thalweg): 20 ft (6.1 m)

Power Station
- Commission date: 2003 (Note: The original power station was built 1901–03, rebuilt in 1911, and operated until 1950.)
- Type: Conventional
- Installed capacity: 0.750 MW

Arizona Falls is a waterfall in Phoenix, Arizona, U.S. It was formed when the man-made Arizona Canal crossed a natural, 20-foot (6.1 m) drop in the area of present-day 56th Street in the Arcadia neighborhood of Phoenix. The site became a popular location for social activities before and after being used as a hydroelectric power station that provided the first electricity to Phoenix. After generating power for 50 years, the site was left run down. Modern air conditioning lessened the attraction of the falls and the area was neglected for decades. In the early 2000s, the site was rebuilt both as a public-art project and a functional power station which generates enough electricity to power about 150 average Phoenix homes. Walkers, joggers, and cyclists using a recreation path along the canal pass through the park. It is also a destination attraction for other visitors. The modern park opened in 2003.

== History ==
Contractor William J. Murphy was responsible for the waterfall. Murphy, a midwestern entrepreneur, had just completed work on a grading project for the Atlantic and Pacific Railroad in northern Arizona when he won a contract to build the Arizona Canal, an irrigation canal that would take water from the Salt River for distribution, primarily for agriculture, throughout the northern part of the Valley of the Sun. Work on the canal began in 1883 and reached a hard rock formation in 1884. It was decided to leave the rock in place and incorporate it into the canal, letting the water flow over it, thus creating the man-made waterfall.

The waterfall became a popular attraction. The desert oasis was a novelty and a cool place in the hot dry desert environment, where the evaporative cooling effect of the mist of the falling water lowered the air temperature and trees provided shade. People from Phoenix and Tempe, both six to seven miles (9.7 to 11.3 km) away, traveled there for recreational activities, such as picnics. Visitors to the Valley were often taken there as well to see the sight. The unincorporated area around the falls was sparsely populated and took on the name Arizona Falls; the name was given to the election precinct of Maricopa County that encompassed the area.

By 1892, a plan was made to build a railway from Phoenix to Arizona Falls, with electric locomotives powered by electricity generated at the falls. The railway, inspired by early electric lines in California, was to use Enright "noiseless and smokeless engines" and had major investors from Phoenix, San Francisco, and Hamilton, Ohio. The Arizona Improvement Company was then developing the town of Ingleside by the falls (Note: Ingleside was eventually absorbed into Phoenix) and planting the first commercial citrus orchards. A mill was constructed at the falls around the same time.

== Electric plant ==
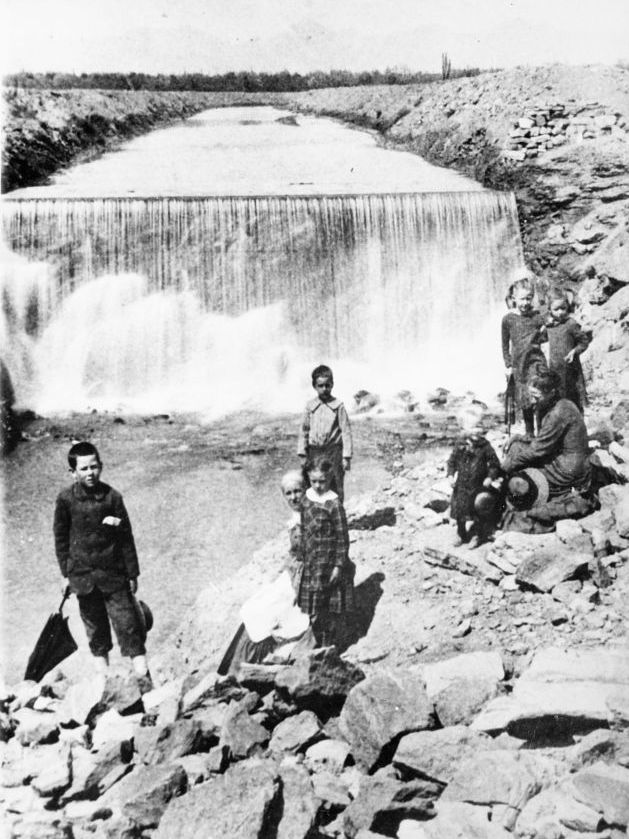
Children at the Arizona Falls on the Arizona Canal, before construction of the power station in 1901

The first plant was built in 1901–02 by the Phoenix Light and Fuel Company, the predecessor to Arizona Public Service, to provide electricity to Phoenix. In 1907, it was reported that electricity for Phoenix would be generated at Roosevelt Dam instead and power from the Arizona Falls plant (Note: After 1906, Phoenix Light and Fuel Company was known as Pacific Gas & Electric) would supply farmers in the immediate area.

By 1909, engineers of the Salt River Project (SRP), the operator of the canal system (originally the Salt River Valley Water Users' Association), decided to take over operation of the Arizona Falls power station and replace the generating equipment, increasing capacity by a third, to 700 hp. The plant was completely rebuilt beginning in 1911. SRP hoped that it could realize savings by ordering additional 48-inch turbines that were being built by S. Morgan Smith of York, Pennsylvania, for the Granite Reef Dam power station. Engineers determined they would not work satisfactorily at Arizona Falls which has a much smaller drop. A separate specification was issued and a contract for two 745-hp turbines was issued to S. Morgan Smith later in the year at a cost of $11,500. Two 535-kVA 25-Hz generators were purchased from General Electric for $15,462, and Westinghouse Electric furnished other equipment for $2,925. Also purchased were two 30-kW transformers and two cranes. The generators were the largest pieces of machinery ever "imported" into the Phoenix area at the time.

The powerhouse building was about 40 ft × 40 ft (12 m × 12 m). A concrete wasteway diverted water back into the canal when the turbines were not operating. A spillway returned water to the canal that had passed through the turbines. Both structures were built with 600 yd^{3} (460 m^{3}) of concrete. The spillway was of a unique compact design that used a siphon that could be constructed less expensively than a longer gravity channel. A four-room cottage was built as a residence for the plant's operator at a cost of $2,151. Construction was completed in the spring of 1913 with final testing of the generating equipment occurring at the end of May. The first customer was a nearby cement plant.

After the plant, which covered up the falls, was constructed, its roof doubled as a dance floor, often for guests who traveled from the nearby Ingleside Inn — the valley's first resort. The resort was built by Murphy, the canal's contractor, who thought the falls would draw other Midwesterners to the area.

In July 1911, heavy rains caused the canal bank just above the falls to fail. The rushing water encircled the falls and broke into the canal just below the falls. This was one of several canals damaged in the storm.

In 1914–1915, a collective non-profit power cooperative was organized to buy power from the Arizona Falls plant for its members, farmers in the northeastern Valley, under the name "Falls Power & Electric Co." In 1918, the Scottsdale Light and Power Co. was formed to purchase power from the falls and distribute it to Scottsdale, about three miles (4.8 km) east. The company, led by E.O. Brown and Charles Miller, ran a 24 kv line from the falls to Scottsdale to serve its initial 150 customers. This company would later merge into the modern APS in 1940.

The plant was taken out of service Oct 2, 1950, as it had become too expensive to maintain and needed costly repairs. After the plant was shut, the canal still flowed through the structure and remained concealed from public view; the site was not returned to a more natural state.

== Redevelopment ==
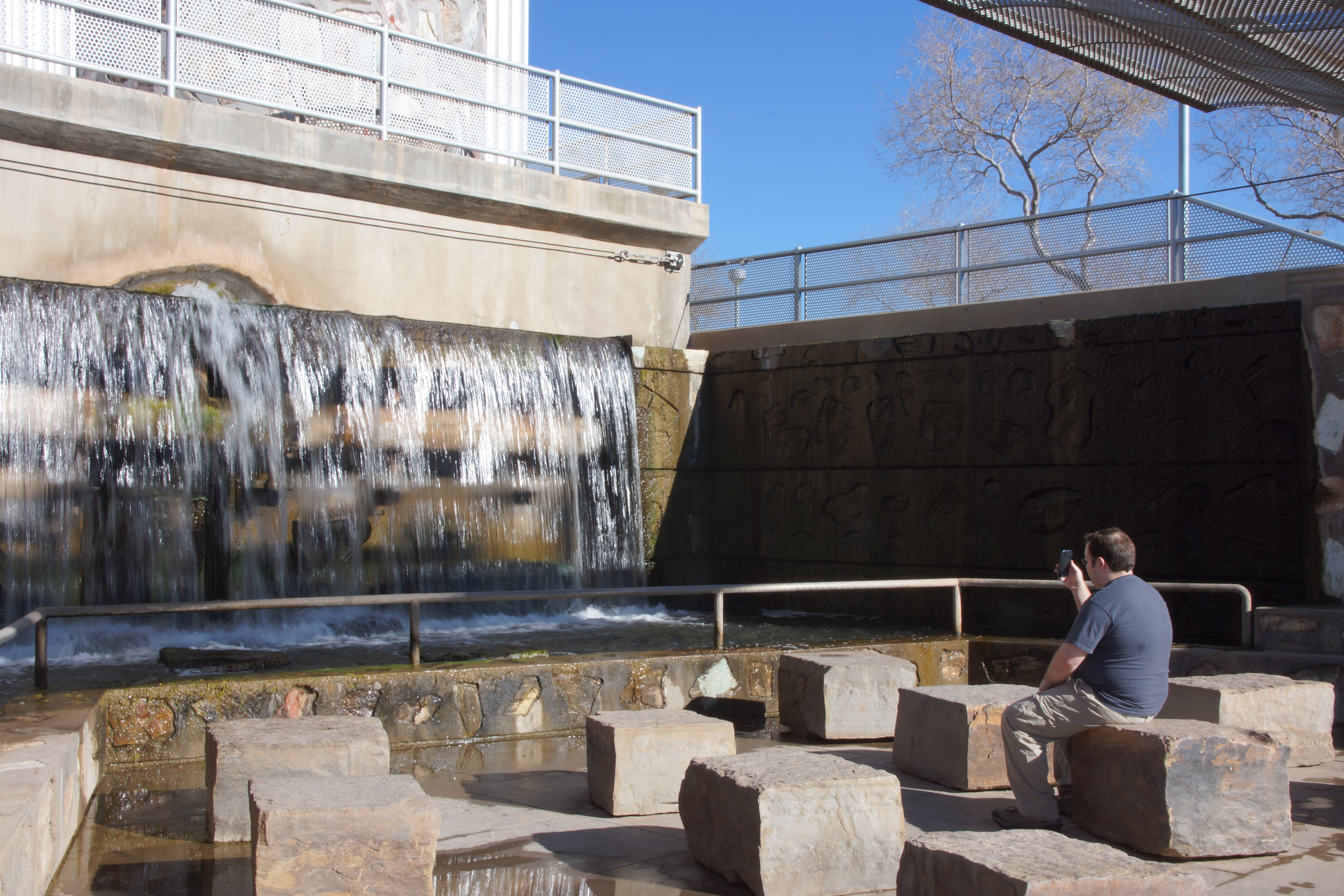
Decorative waterfall at power station

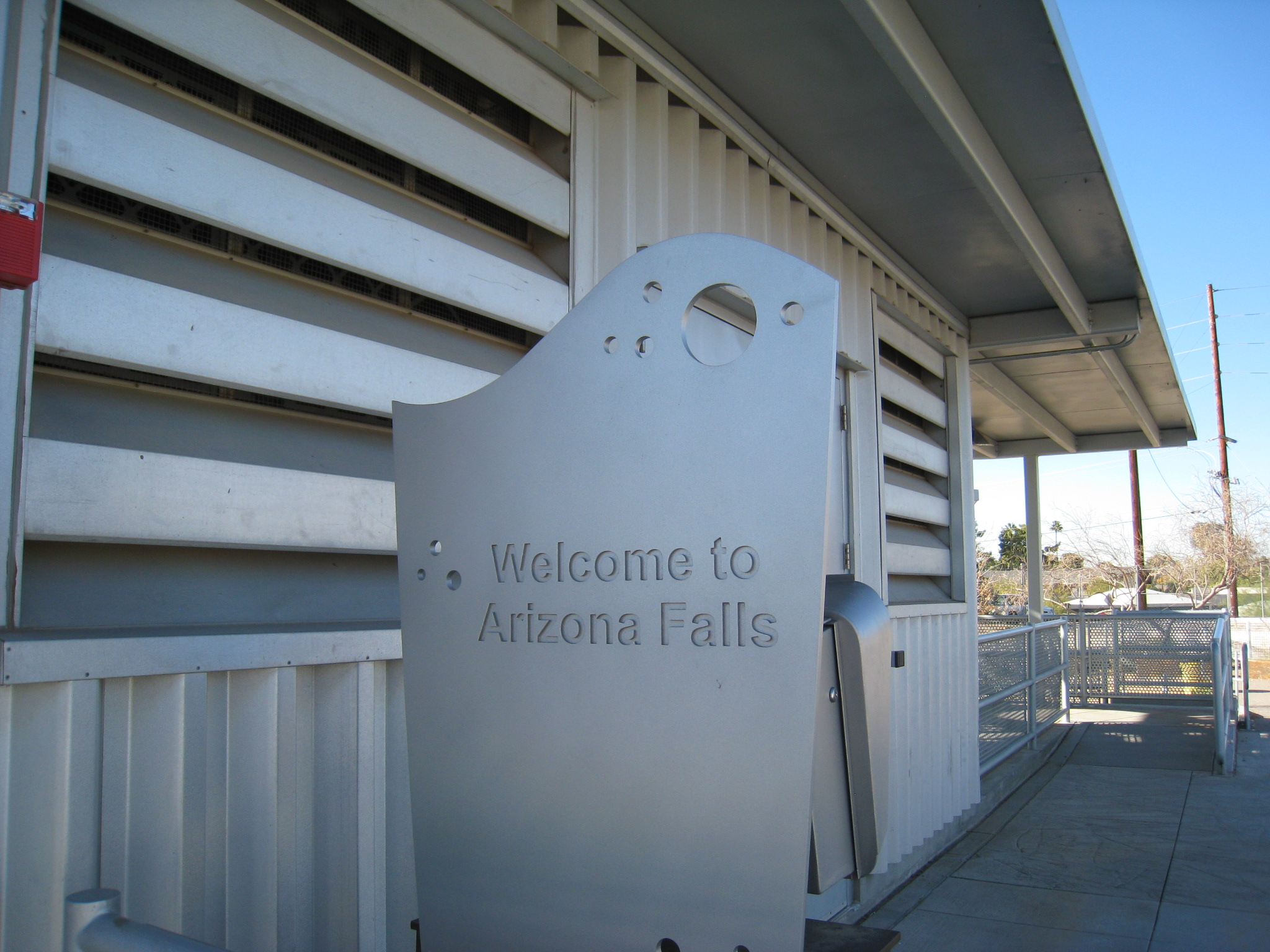
Sign at power station

About 25 years later, SRP considered a new small hydro plant at the falls. It went ahead in 1978 with a new plant on the South Consolidated Canal in Mesa but rejected a new plant at Arizona Falls. In 1980, due to even higher crude oil prices, it was determined that a 850 kW plant was economically justified. Interest in the falls was furthered in the early 1990s when an effort began to utilize the Valley canal system for recreation and community benefit, rather than just as utilitarian infrastructure.

Transformation of the site into a park was first proposed by the Phoenix Arts Commission in January 1998. SRP decided to rebuild the power station in conjunction with the park project. The rebuild of the power station by SRP was budgeted at $4 million and was the largest SRP renewable energy plant in the Valley at the time. Depending on waterflow, the falls can generate up to 750 kilowatts of electricity, supplemented by solar panels on the roof of the plant and adjacent park structures, which is fed into the SRP electric grid. The power station went online in April 2003.

== Art ==
The Phoenix City Council approved an expenditure of $60,000 in April 2000 to design the restoration of the falls. The total city budget for the project was $300,000. By 2002, the city's contribution had increased to $1.5 million under the Arts Commission. The park was designed by Boston architect Lajos Heder and sculptor Mags Harries, under commission of the Phoenix Office of Arts and Culture. The landscape architect was Steve Martino. Heder and Harries, who are married and had worked on a prior Phoenix public art project, were selected in January 2000 after winning an open competition for the design that received five entries. The park incorporates the original rust-encrusted gears used in the original power station. Signage tells of the history and design of the plant. Visitors can walk across the canal on a footbridge. As the canal and waterfall are fed with water from the Salt River watershed and its five major dams that store water in the SRP system, the park features a boulder from each of the dam sites. The park, made primarily of concrete, stone, and steel, had a budget of over $2 million in 2003. Funding was provided by the City of Phoenix and the US Bureau of Reclamation. The Bureau of Reclamation owns the federal land on which the canal is located and leases it to the canal operator, SRP.

Concrete channels run underneath a deck, named the Stoa Deck after the Greek word for "gathering place", and guide the canal into the power station turbines at an average rate of 750 cu ft/s (21 m^{3}/s). 10–15 cu ft/s (0.28–0.42 m^{3}/s) of water is diverted to the waterfall features of the park, two 20-foot (6.1 m) waterfalls and a 10-foot (3.0 m) water wall that surround the viewing platform or "outdoor room", fed by two small aqueducts.

Poetry about water, written by Arizona's first state poet laureate, Alberto Rios, is sandblasted into concrete. Although located on Bureau of Reclamation land leased to SRP, the park is maintained by the City of Phoenix as is the city's adjacent G.R. Herberger Park, where visitor parking for the combined facility is located. The site reopened to the public on June 21, 2003. The park project was combined with a street landscape improvement project on two miles of Indian School Road from 48th to 64th Streets where the canal was above grade and its banks were unattractive gunite concrete. The canal was hidden with decorative walls and landscaping, also designed by Martino.

The project received the top award (Presidents Award) from Valley Forward at its annual Environmental Excellence Awards in 2003, an award to recognize efforts that "improve the environment and quality of life in the Phoenix area". The Arizona Republic named it "Best Public Art" for 2003. In January 2004, it was one of ten finalists out of 70 nominations to become the next Phoenix Point of Pride.

== Education ==
SRP encourages area schoolteachers to use the facility to teach about renewable energy and other environmental aspects of the site and canal system. SRP provides them with lesson plans.
