= Porter station =

Transit station in Cambridge, Massachusetts, US

Porter
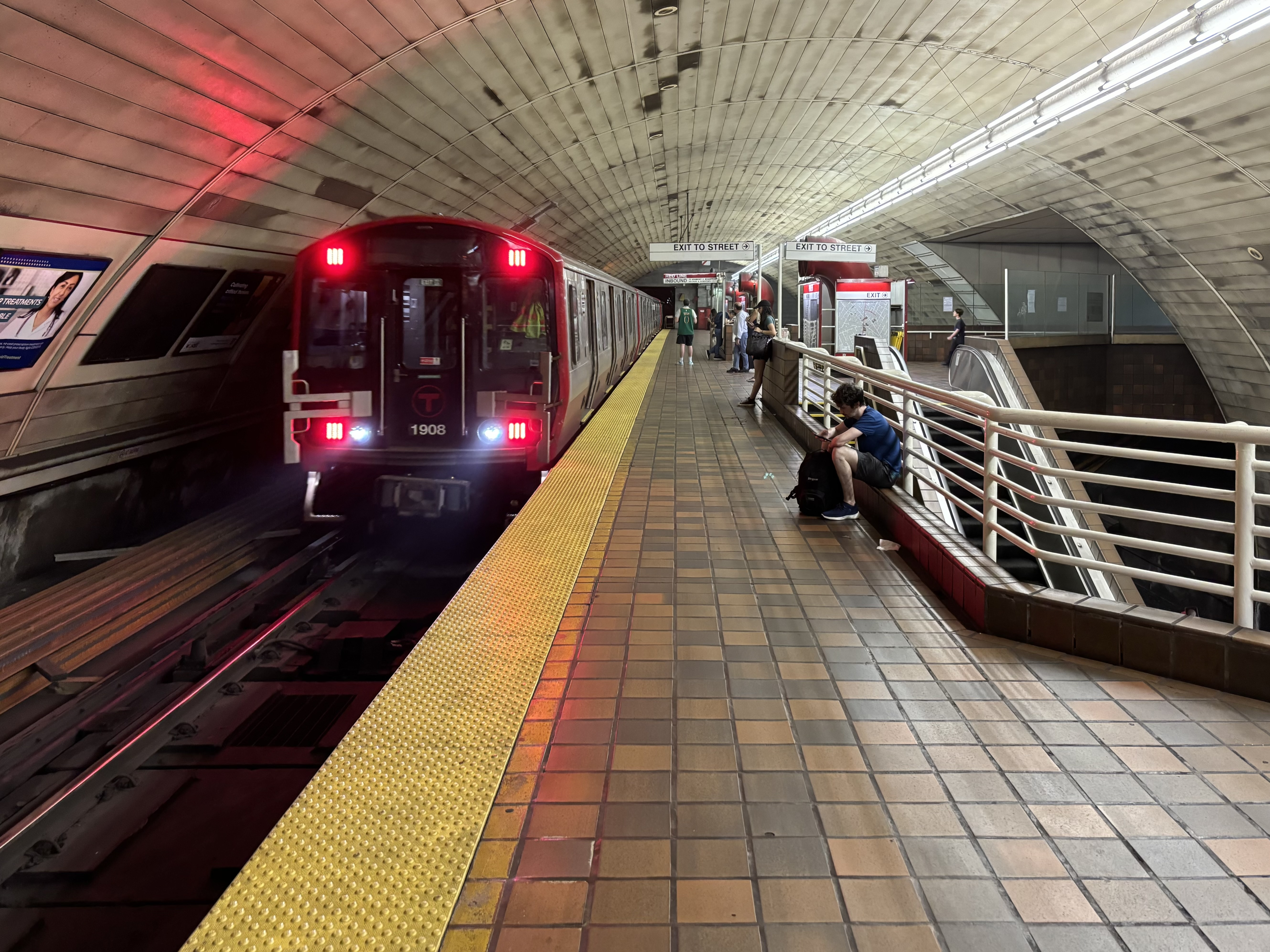
- A southbound Red Line train entering Porter station in 2024

General information
- Location: Massachusetts Avenue at Somerville Avenue; Cambridge, Massachusetts
- Coordinates: 42°23′18.0″N 71°7′8.5″W
- Lines: Fitchburg Route; Red Line Northwest Extension
- Platforms: 1 island platform (Fitchburg Line); 2 split side platforms (Red Line)
- Tracks: 2 (Fitchburg Line); 2 (Red Line)
- Connections: MBTA bus: 77, 83, 96

Construction
- Cycle facilities: 34 spaces
- Accessible: yes

Other information
- Fare zone: 1A (commuter rail)

History
- Opened: 1845 (Fitchburg Railroad); December 8, 1984 (Red Line)
- Rebuilt: 1897, 1937
- Former names: Porter's Station, North Cambridge, Cambridge

Passengers
- 2024: 676 daily boardings (Fitchburg Line)
- FY2019: 8,094 daily boardings (Red Line)

Services
Preceding station	MBTA	Following station
Belmont Center toward Wachusett	Fitchburg Line	North Station Terminus
Davis toward Alewife	Red Line	Harvard toward Ashmont or Braintree
Former services
Preceding station	MBTA	Following station
Lake Street toward Bedford	Lexington Branch Closed 1977	North Station Terminus
Waltham North toward South Sudbury	Central Mass Branch Closed 1971	North Station Terminus
Preceding station	Boston and Maine Railroad	Following station
Hill Crossing toward Northampton	Central Mass Branch	Boston Terminus
Track layout
Location

Porter station is a Massachusetts Bay Transportation Authority (MBTA) transit station in Cambridge, Massachusetts. It serves the Red Line rapid transit line, the MBTA Commuter Rail Fitchburg Line, and several MBTA bus lines. Located at Porter Square at the intersection of Massachusetts and Somerville Avenues, the station provides rapid transit access to northern Cambridge and the western portions of Somerville. Porter is 14 minutes from Park Street on the Red Line, and about 10 minutes from North Station on commuter rail trains. Several local MBTA bus routes also stop at the station.

A series of commuter rail depots have been located at Porter Square under various names since the 1840s. The modern station with both subway and commuter rail levels was designed by Cambridge Seven Associates and opened on December 8, 1984. At 105 feet (32 m) below ground, the subway section is the deepest station on the MBTA system. The station originally had six artworks installed as part of the Arts on the Line program. Five of these remain, including Gift of the Wind and Glove Cycle.

== History ==
=== Early history ===
There has been a railroad station at Porter Square since the Fitchburg Railroad began operations in the early 1840s. The first station, built in 1843–1845, was called Porter's Station. A new station building was constructed in 1854. Later stations at the site were known as North Cambridge, then later simply as Cambridge. In 1869, the original station was moved to the North Avenue (now Massachusetts Avenue) bridge over the tracks.

=== B&M era ===
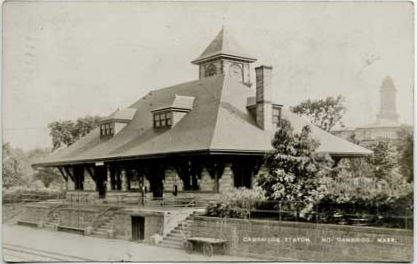
Second station, built in 1897, on a postcard sent in 1911

A new station was built in 1897, slightly to the southeast, behind the Lovell Block. In 1927, the Fitchburg Cutoff became freight-only between the Alewife area and Somerville Junction. Passenger trains from the Lexington Branch and the Central Massachusetts Railroad were diverted to the Fitchburg mainline and began to stop at Cambridge station. In 1937–38, the Boston and Maine Railroad built a two-story brick depot by the bridge, with the ticket office at street level and the waiting room and platforms below. The new station opened on May 2, 1938; the old station was demolished to make room for a parking lot for the adjacent Sears, Roebuck and Company store. As passenger traffic declined, the B&M sold and leased disused station buildings; the Cambridge station was converted to office use by 1968.

=== MBTA era ===
By the time the newly formed Massachusetts Bay Transportation Authority (MBTA) began subsidizing northside commuter rail operations in the late 1960s, both the Lexington Branch and the Central Mass Branch had been reduced to single rush hour round trips on poorly maintained track. The South Sudbury run on the Central Mass was terminated on November 26, 1971. The Bedford round trip on the Lexington Branch ended after a major snowstorm on January 10, 1977, leaving the Fitchburg Line (with multiple daily round trips) as the only rail service at Cambridge station.

=== Adding the Red Line ===
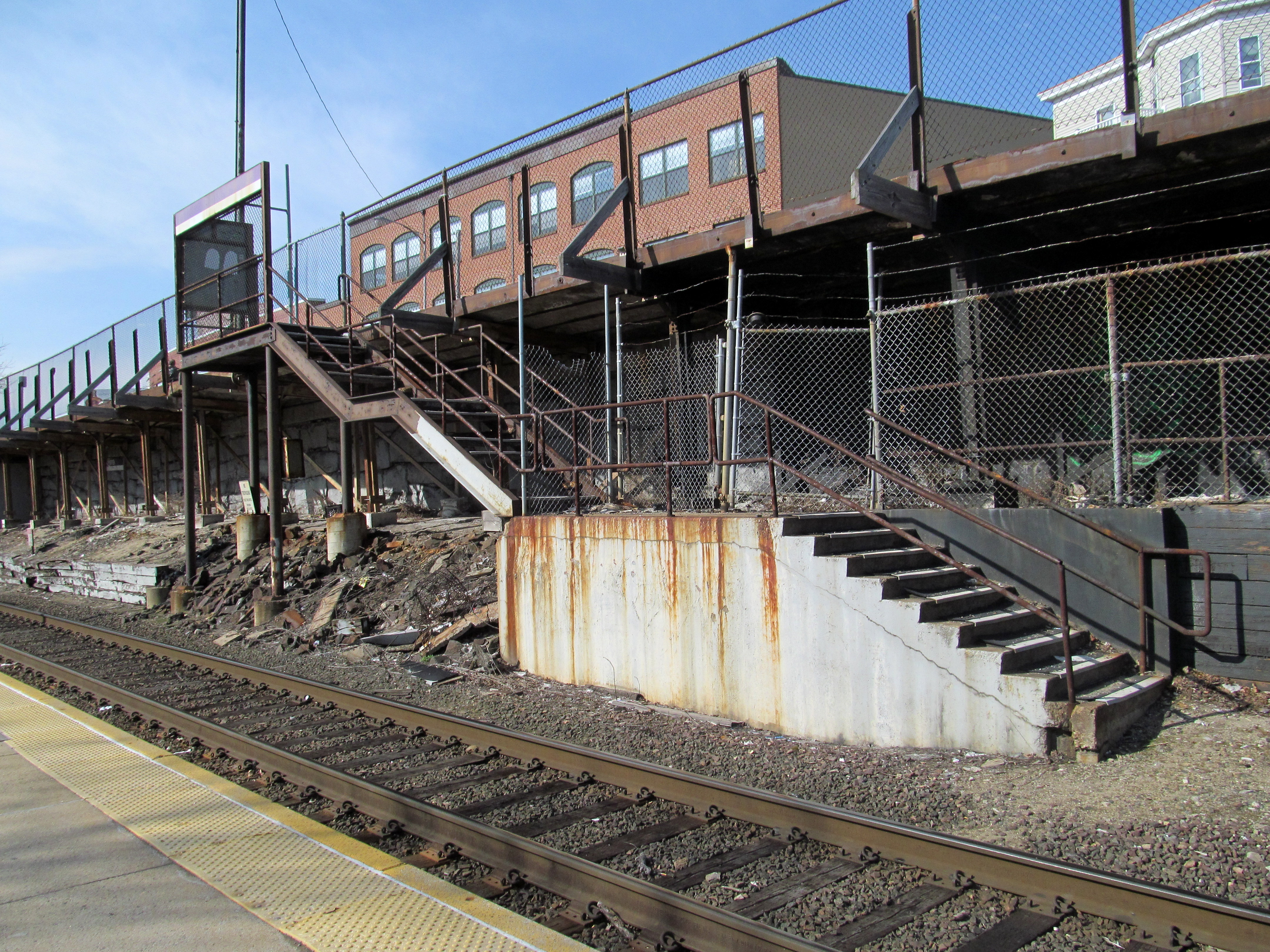
Rusted-out stairs from Somerville Avenue, used to access the commuter platform during the building of the modern station

In the late 1970s, Cambridge station was renamed to Porter when it became certain that the Red Line Northwest Extension would include a stop there. ("Cambridge", while sufficient for a commuter rail station, would have been confusing for a rapid transit station, because the Red Line has multiple stations—five in total—in the City of Cambridge.) The Red Line platforms were built in a deep-bore tunnel, while the commuter platform was rebuilt with an accessible mini-high platform. During construction, commuter trains were accessed via a staircase from Somerville Avenue. On September 30, 1980, construction worker Paul Leone was killed when a retaining wall collapsed.

A new glass and concrete headhouse was built around 1982, and the complete new transfer station opened on December 8, 1984, along with Davis. The new station, designed by Cambridge Seven Associates, won awards from the American Institute of Architects and the American Consulting Engineering Council of New England. Porter and Davis were the first MBTA stations made accessible during initial construction, rather than by renovation. A second entrance on the west side of Massachusetts Avenue was added in the late 1980s.

Because of its Red Line connection, Porter Square can serve as a temporary inbound terminus for the Fitchburg Line service when commuter rail service is disrupted between Porter and Boston's North Station. It served this role during the 2004 Democratic National Convention, when North Station was closed for a week for security purposes, and during Green Line Extension construction in 2015 and 2019–20. Additional weekday short turn service was operated between Porter and North Station from July 15–26, 2024, providing half-hour headways between those points while the Red Line was closed for maintenance work.

The staircase from Somerville Avenue was removed in 2020 during retaining wall reconstruction; a new staircase may be added later. An extension of the Union Square Branch of the Green Line Extension from Union Square to Porter has been proposed by local officials.

== Station layout ==
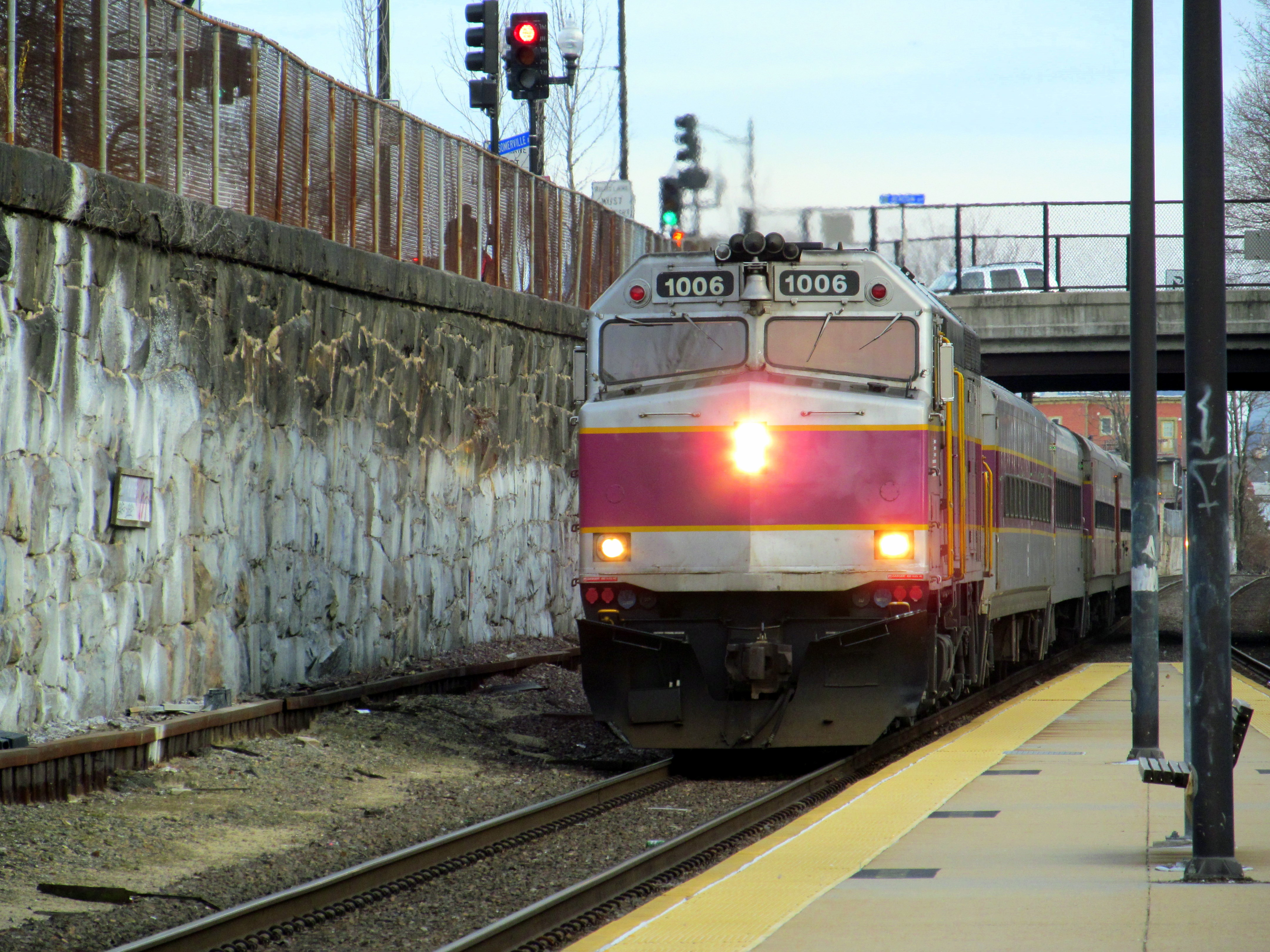
An outbound commuter rail train arrives at Porter in 2012

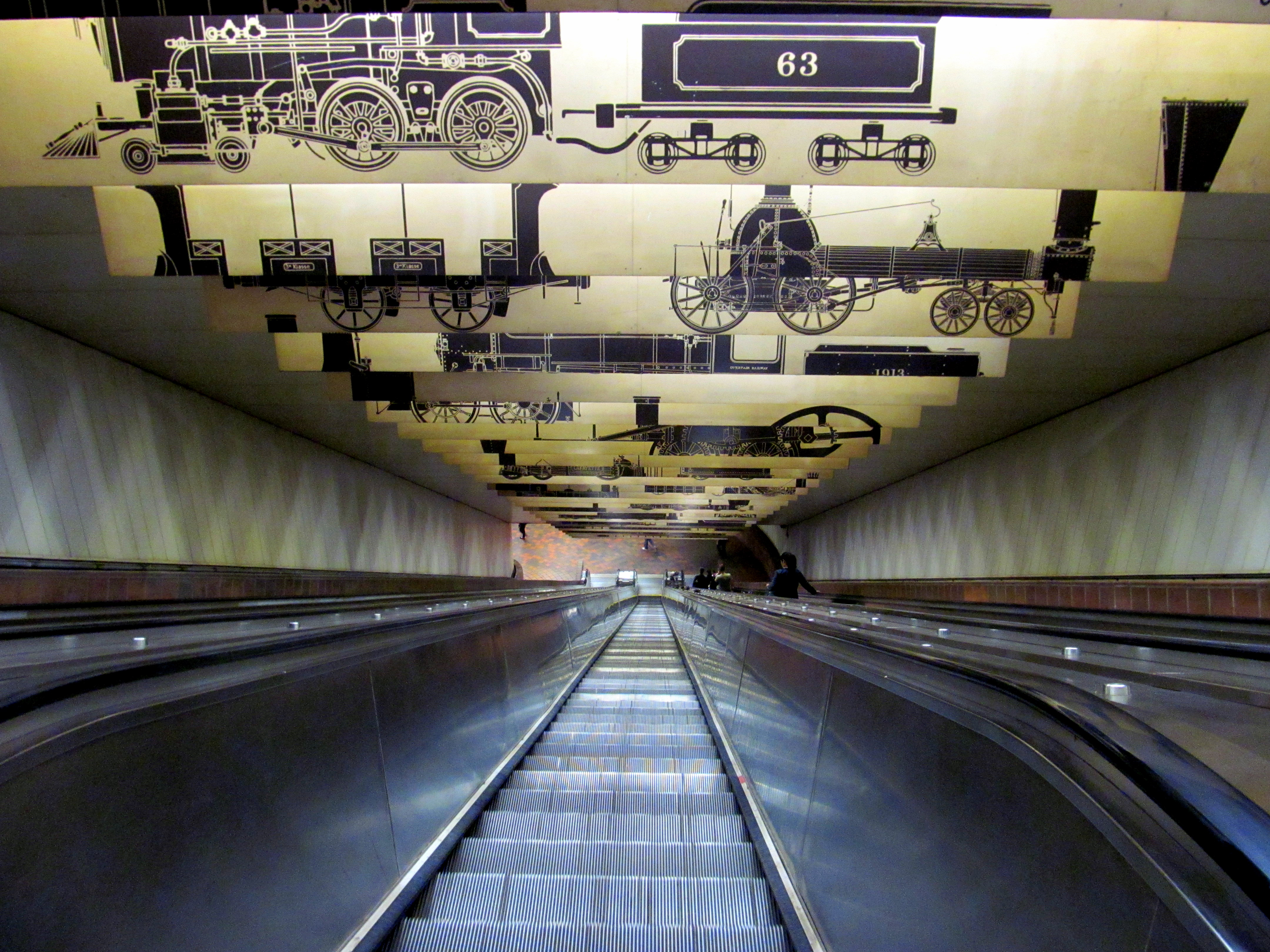
Looking down the MBTA's longest escalator, at Porter station. This escalator runs from the fare mezzanine to the inbound subway platform level. The overhead graphics theme commemorates early railroad history.

Porter station has a glass-covered headhouse located on the east side of Massachusetts Avenue just south of Somerville Avenue. The station has four below-ground levels. The Fitchburg Line runs approximately east-west in an open cut, with a single island platform between the two tracks. Most of the platform is low, with a raised mini-high platform at the west end under Massachusetts Avenue. Direct stair entrances to the platform are located on both sides of Massachusetts Avenue.

A mezzanine, partially under Somerville Avenue east of White Street, is one level deeper. It contains fare machines, faregates for the Red Line, a convenience store, and – unusually for the MBTA system – public restrooms. Stairs, escalators, and elevators connect the mezzanine to the platforms and the surface. MBTA bus routes 77, 83, and 96 serve the station.

South of Porter Square, the Red Line runs north-south under Massachusetts Avenue. North of the square, the avenue turns to the northwest, while the Red Line runs north in a deep-bored tunnel to Davis Square. The Red Line platforms are mostly north of the headhouse, partially under the Porter Square Shopping Center. The subway tracks and platforms are enclosed in a single cylindrical concrete shell. The two platforms are at different levels, with the inbound (southbound) platform above and laterally offset from the outbound platform. The platforms are near the center of the shell, with the outbound track on the east side and the inbound track on the west side.

At 105 feet (32 m) below ground level, the outbound platform is the deepest in the MBTA system. Porter's unusual depth is due to the MBTA's decision to build the station in bedrock rather than soft clay, saving time and money in the construction process. Passengers reach Red Line platforms via a series of escalators, stairs totalling 199 steps, or a set of elevators. The longest single span of the escalators is 143 feet (44 m), the longest in the MBTA system. In 2005, a man was killed when his sweatshirt tangled in the bottom of the escalator.

=== Accessibility ===
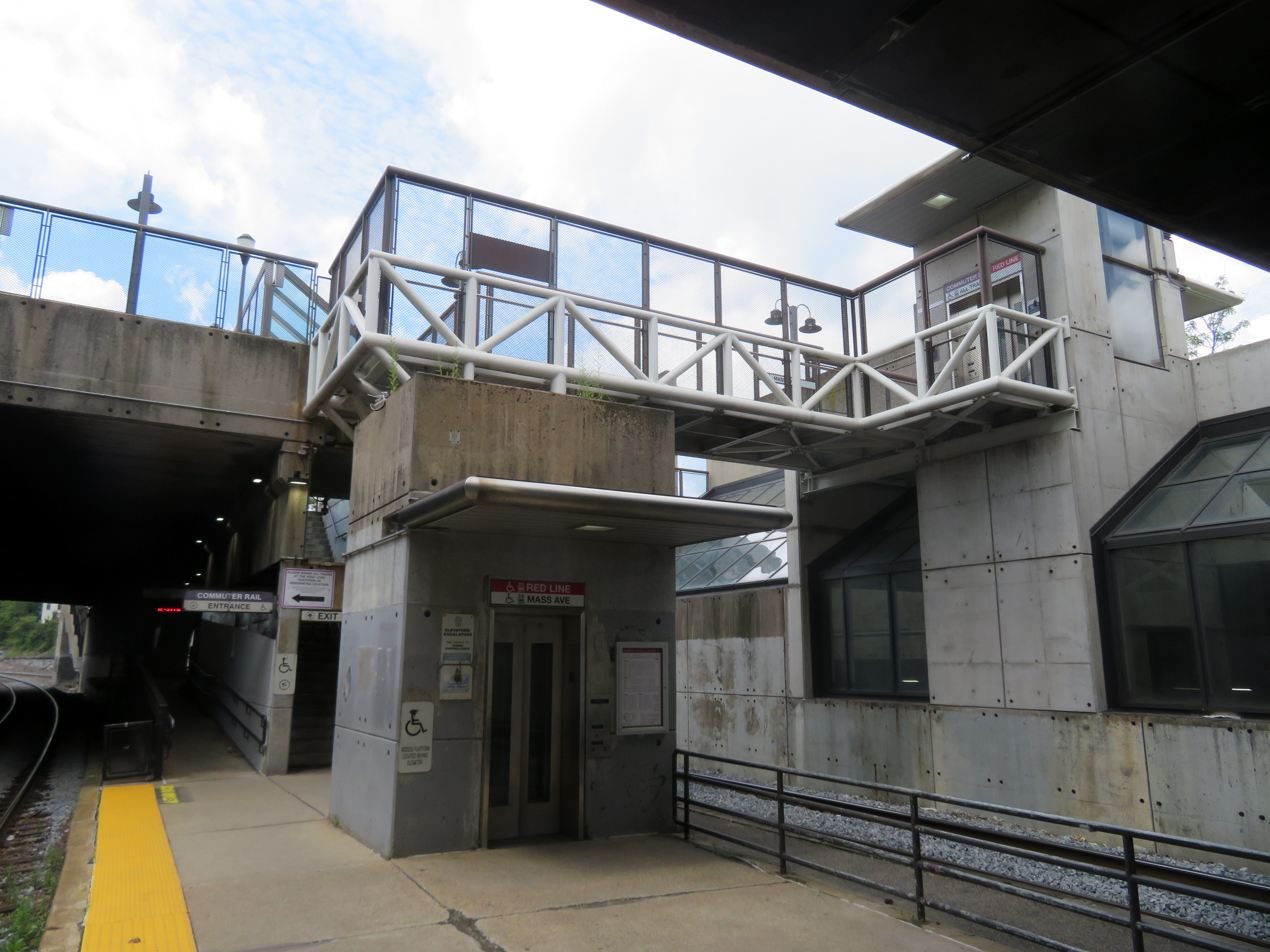
Commuter rail platform elevator (left) and Massachusetts Avenue elevator

Porter is fully accessible; elevators lead from street level to the mezzanine with its accessible bathrooms, to the commuter rail platform, and to both Red Line platform levels. Although most of the commuter platform is low, there is a "mini-high platform" – a one-car-length high section – that allows level boarding.

The station was originally built with three elevators: from Elm Street to the fare lobby, from the lobby to both Red Line platforms, and from the lobby to the commuter rail platform. The MBTA installed additional elevators at Porter and four other busy MBTA subway stations as part of the settlement of Joanne Daniels-Finegold, et al. v. MBTA. The three existing elevators were overhauled, and two redundant elevators were added, in a $12 million project.

The elevator to the Red Line platforms was out of service for construction from March 21, 2011, to June 22, 2012; an accessible shuttle bus ran between Porter and Davis. The elevator to the commuter rail platform was also taken out of service from December 9, 2011, to July 2012; a shuttle bus ran between Harvard, Porter, and Waltham. An elevator from Massachusetts Avenue to the lobby opened later that year, followed by an overhaul of the existing street elevator; the redundant Red Line platform elevator was completed in 2013.

== Arts on the Line ==
As a part of the Red Line Northwest Extension, Porter was included as one of the stations involved in the Arts on the Line program, devised to bring art into the MBTA's subway stations in the late 1970s and early 1980s. It was the first program of its kind in the United States and became the model for similar drives for art across the country.

Six works, five of which remain, were placed at Porter:

- Gift of the Wind by Susumu Shingu, a 46 foot (14 m) tall kinetic sculpture with three large red "wings" that rotate the structure in response to the wind
- Ondas by Carlos Dorrien, a 24 foot (7.3 m) tall piece of undulating granite affixed to the station wall both inside the station and outside
- Glove Cycle by Mags Harries, a large number of bronze gloves of varying types and sizes scattered inside the station, including alongside one of the escalators
- Untitled by William Reimann, six granite bollards with various ethnic designs carved into them
- Porter Square Megaliths by David Phillips, four boulders with large "slices" removed and replaced with bronze casts of the missing pieces
- The Lights at the End of the Tunnel by William Wainwright, a large reflective mobile in the station's mezzanine. It was removed and put into storage in 1993 after a lead weight fell off.
