= Glove Cycle =

Installation by Mags Harries & Lajos Héder

Coordinates: 42°23′18.65″N 71°07′09.4″W

- Artist: Mags Harries
- Year: 1984
- Type: Installation art (bronze)
- Location: Porter station; Cambridge, Massachusetts
- Owner: Massachusetts Bay Transportation Authority

Glove Cycle is a 1984 public art installation by Mags Harries, located throughout the Massachusetts Bay Transportation Authority Porter subway and commuter rail station in Porter Square, Cambridge, Massachusetts. The artwork consists of 54 separate bronze pieces and was created with a budget of US$30,000.

== Sculpture ==
Glove Cycle is a sculptural installation of 54 separate bronze sculptures of gloves located throughout Porter station. Individual gloves are located on a turnstile and between the up and down escalators. Small piles of gloves are located at the bottom of the escalators and on the inbound platform, while other gloves are embedded in the floor of both platforms as well as the mezzanine. The gloves are arranged, some in small vignettes, to have different stories and emotions connected to them. Richard Wolkomir of Smithsonian Magazine explains that the first gloves one approaches in the station are "a big glove giving birth to a little glove", and that "Some gloves have two thumbs, or only three fingers. One large glove extends a finger toward a smaller glove, like a caricature of Michelangelo's Jehovah transmitting life to Adam on the Sistine ceiling."

Robert O. Boorstin from The Harvard Crimson adds that there are gloves "in piles, gripping rails, pushing imaginary buttons—as a constant image that the passenger follows from one point of the station to another". Mags Harries explains that the gloves she crafted "are anthropomorphic objects with many character possibilities and by their multiplication, take on a life form that might be analogous to the people movement in the subway." Robert O. Boorstin claims that this philosophy and explanation are "somewhat extravagant."

== History ==
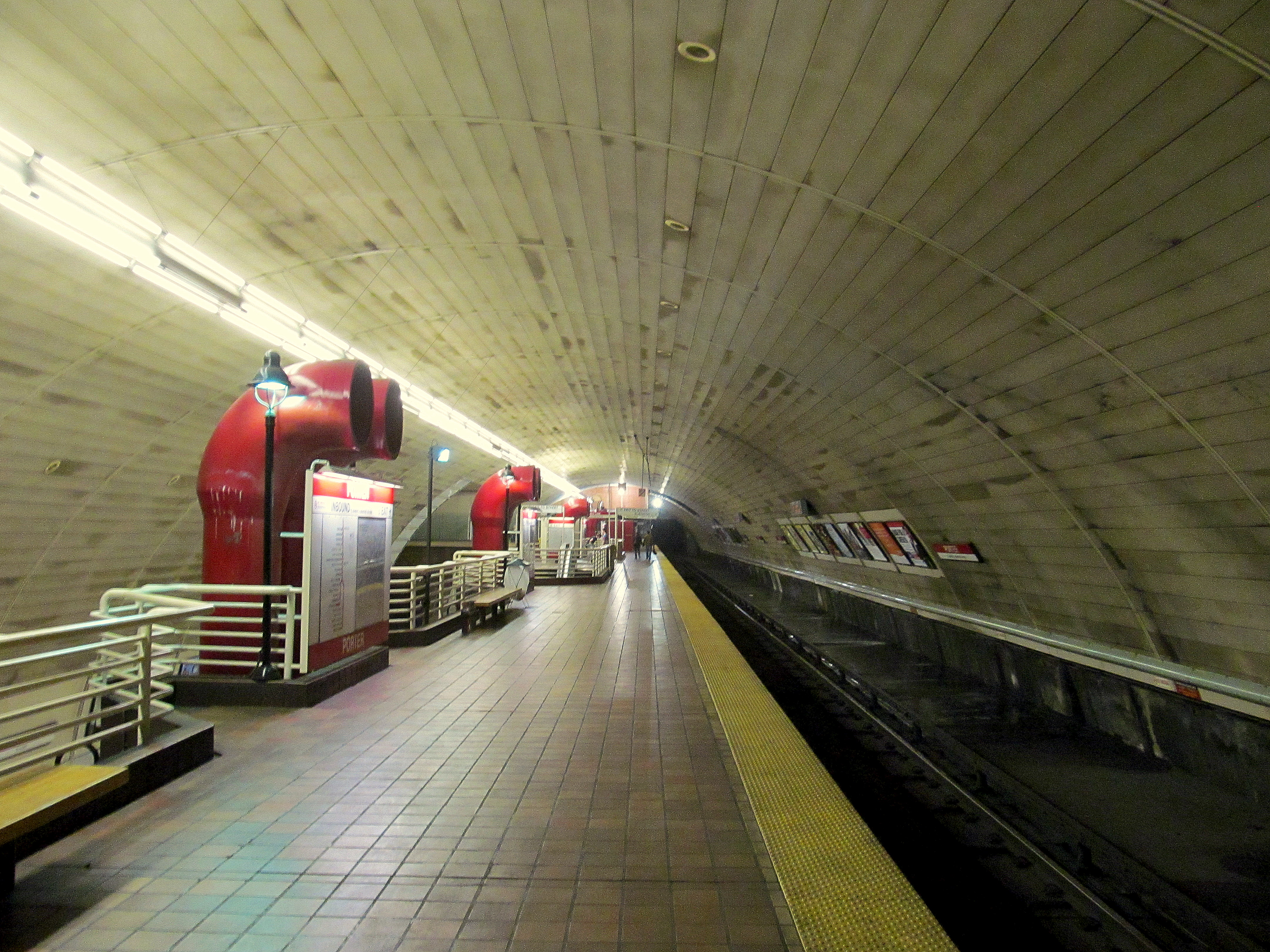
Interior of Porter station showing the inbound platform

Glove Cycle was created as a part of the MBTA and the Cambridge Arts Council's "Arts on the Line" program. This first of its kind program was devised to bring art into the MBTA's planned Northwest Extension of the Red Line subway stations in the late 1970s and early 1980s, and became a model for similar drives for public art across the country. This installation was one of 20 artworks created for this program, out of over 400 proposals submitted by artists for artworks spread out across five different newly created subway stations. The first 20 artworks, including this one, were completed with a total cost of $695,000 USD, or one-half of one percent of the total construction cost of the Red Line Northwest Extension. The cost of this particular sculpture was $30,000.

Gloves was not the first theme that Harries considered for her subterranean artwork. Initially her concept revolved around bronze tree roots appearing to come through the walls and into the stations. This idea was turned down by the architects of Porter Station for bringing attention to the fact that the station is deep underground. Harries stated, "The whole philosophy of subway stations, it turns out, is to make them seem as un-underground as possible," something the tree roots idea would be the exact opposite of. The next theme she considered was to create a flock of sheep-shaped turnstiles. This concept fell to the wayside as the snow from a blizzard in Boston began to melt. Harries began to find lost gloves emerging from the snow. She said that, "They were wet, compacted, squashed—really beautiful!" These lost items gave her the inspiration for her new sculptural theme, gloves.

Three of the gloves were stolen during the sculpture's first decade by vandals who broke them out of walls.
