= Arizona Canal =

Canal in Maricopa County, Arizona, United States

Coordinates: 33°30′23″N 111°59′23″W

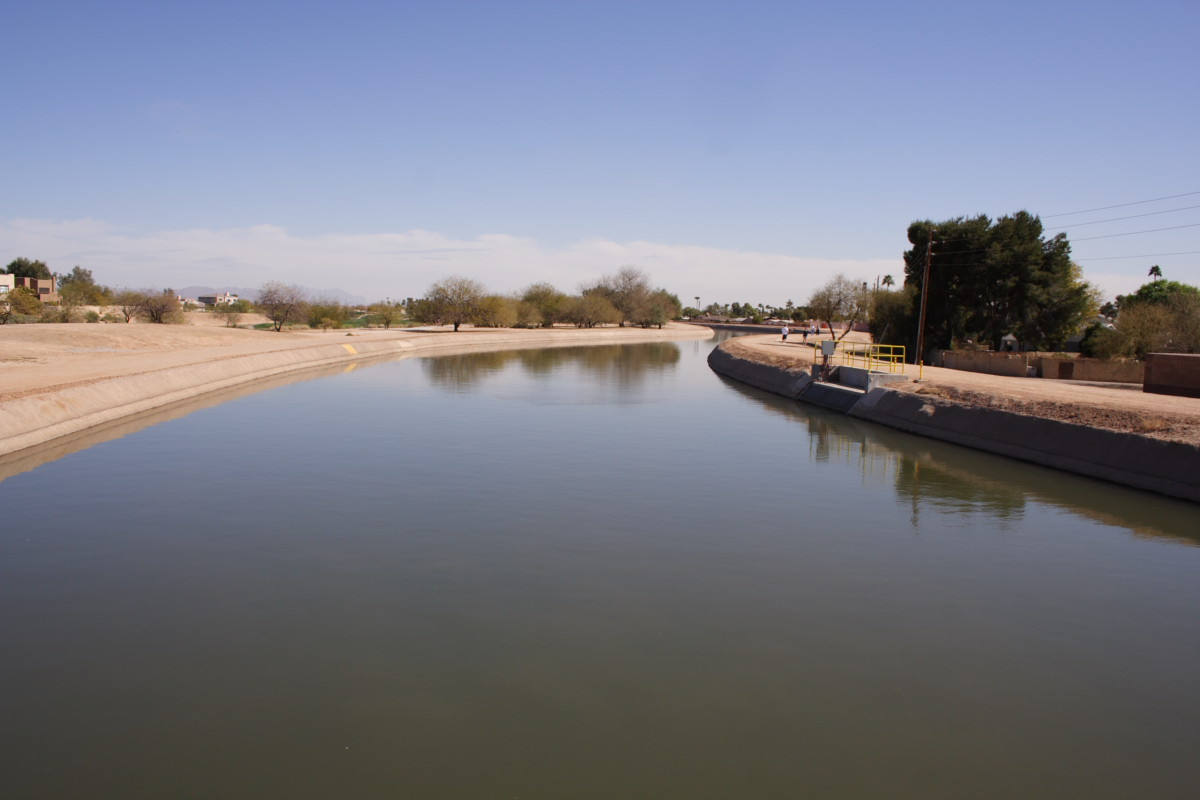
Arizona Canal in Scottsdale, Arizona

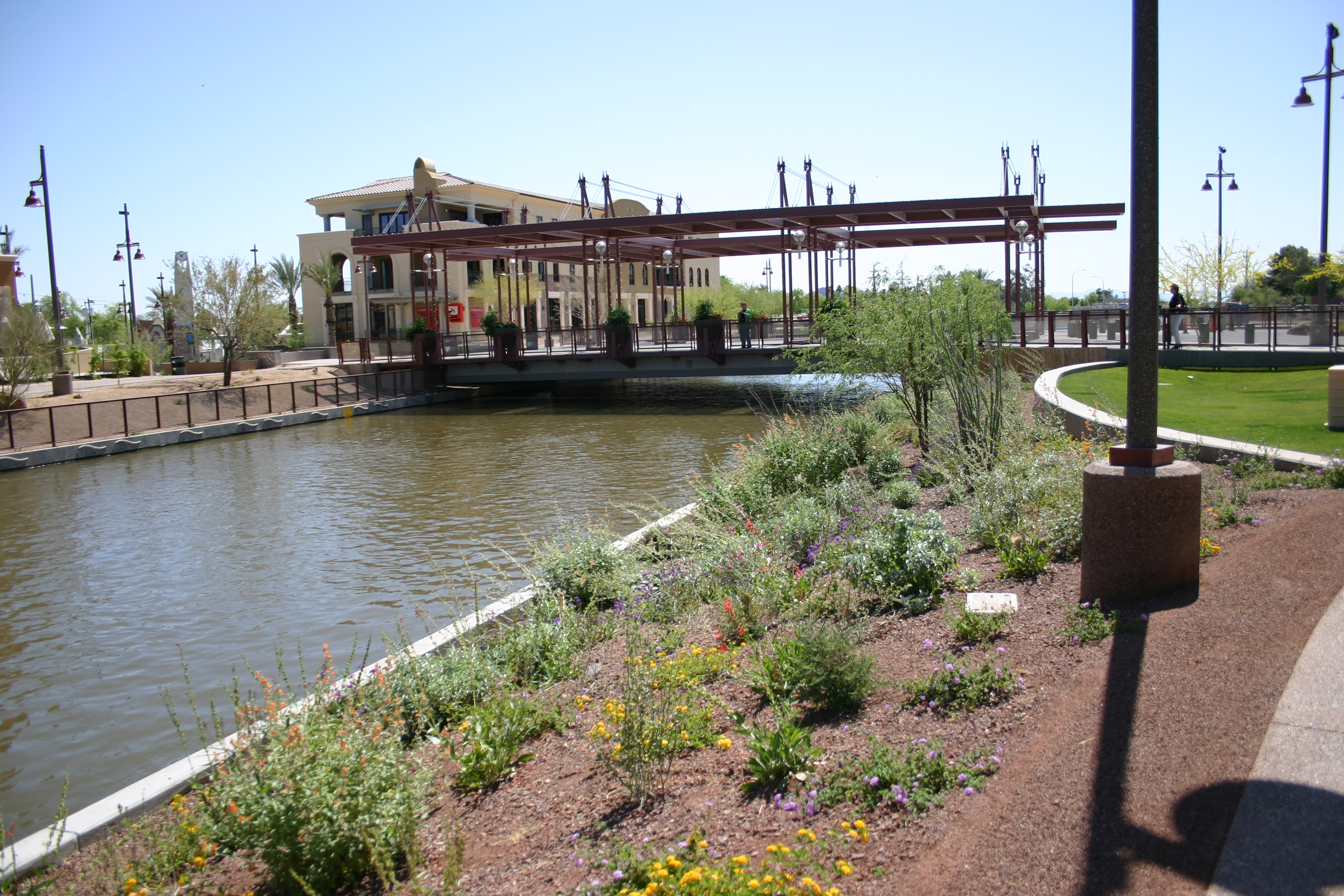
Marshall Way bridge over the Arizona Canal in Downtown Scottsdale.

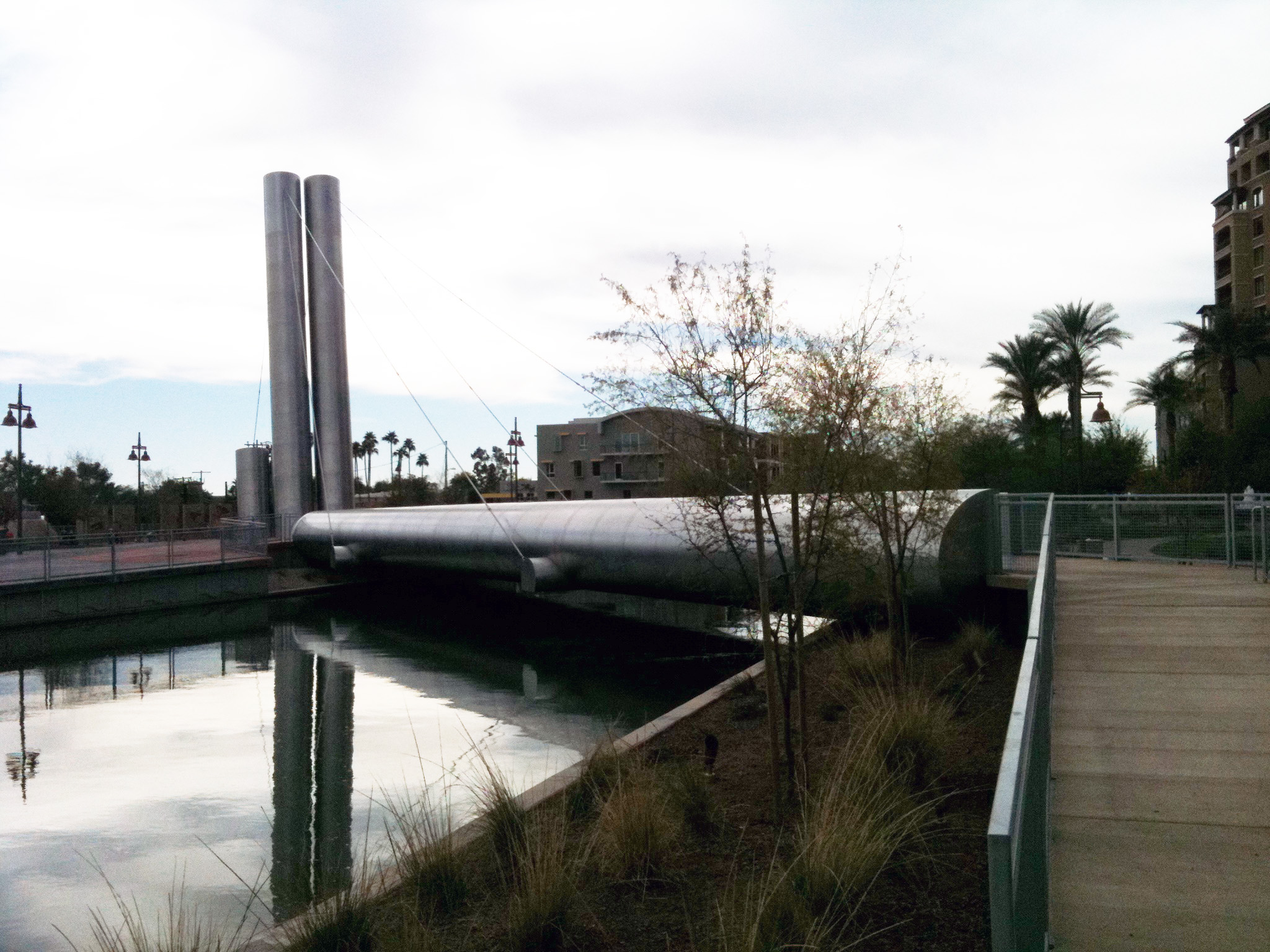
Scottsdale Road pedestrian bridge over the canal designed by Paolo Soleri

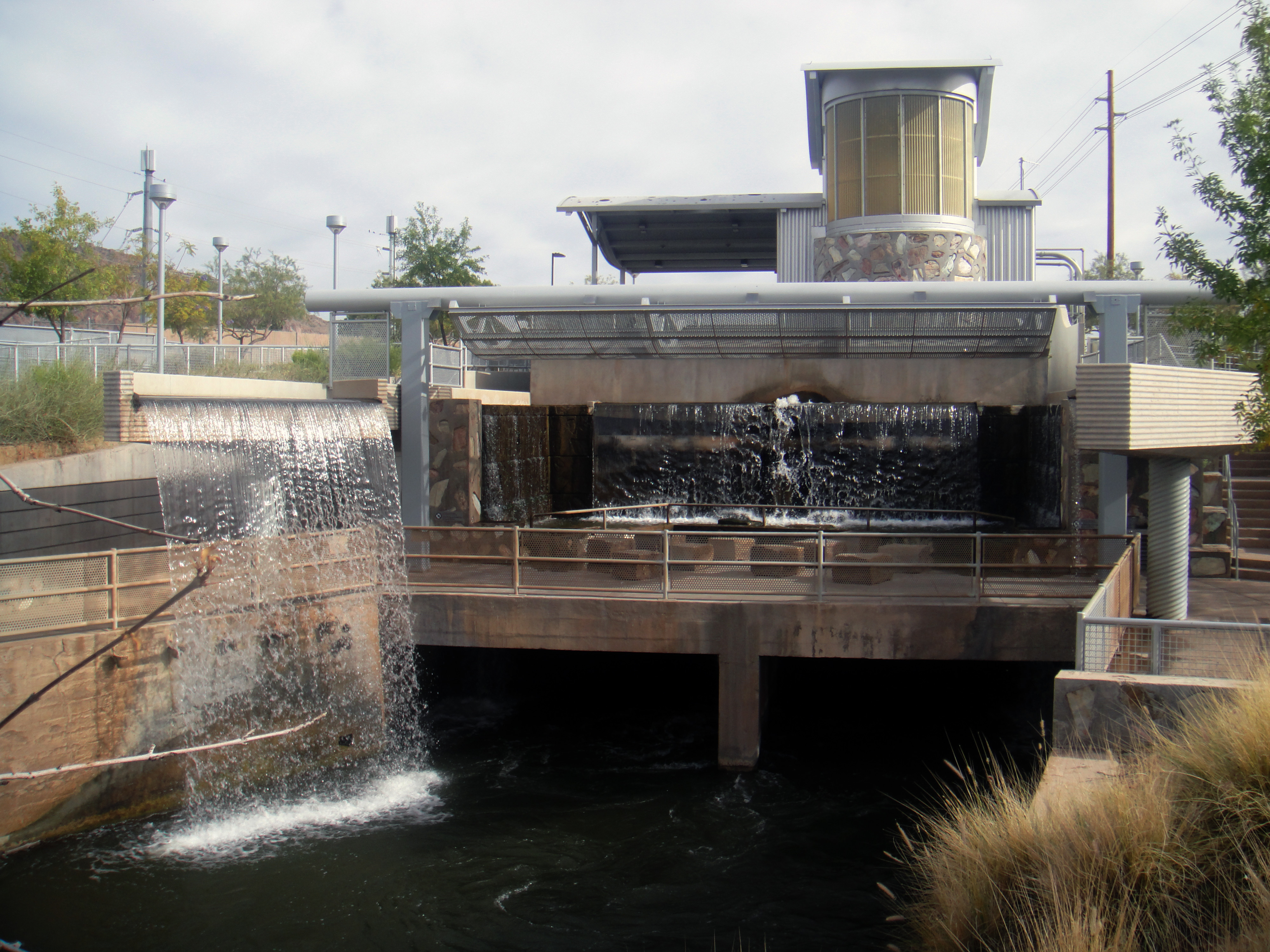
Arizona Falls, part of G.R. Herberger Park in Phoenix, Arizona.

The Arizona Canal is a major canal in central Maricopa County that led to the founding of several communities, now among the wealthier neighborhoods of suburban Phoenix, constructed in the late 1880s. Flood irrigation of residential yards is still common in these neighborhoods, using a system of lateral waterways connected via gates to the canal itself. Like most Valley canals, its banks are popular with joggers and bicyclists. U.S. Bicycle Route 90 runs along the canal from Skunk Creek in Peoria to Maryland Avenue in Phoenix. The Maricopa Trail runs along the Arizona Canal from the Granite Reef Diversion Dam to the Scottsdale Nature Area at Indian Bend Wash; the Sun Circle Trail runs along the Arizona Canal for its entire length.

The canal, nearly 50 miles (80 km) long, is the northernmost canal in the Salt River Project's 131-mile (211 km) water distribution system. Beginning at the Granite Reef Diversion Dam, northeast of Mesa, it flows west across the Salt River Pima-Maricopa Indian Community, downtown Scottsdale, Phoenix's Arcadia and Sunnyslope neighborhoods, Glendale, and Peoria before ending at New River near Arrowhead Towne Center.

== History ==
William John Murphy was hired in 1883 to spearhead its construction, which was completed in May 1885. He then founded Glendale; its downtown Murphy Park is named for him. Nearby Peoria was also founded within the decade.

Several miles upstream (east), 640 acres (2.6 km^{2}) on the canal's south side were purchased in 1888 by a former Civil War chaplain, Major Winfield Scott, establishing what is now Scottsdale. Murphy later built the Ingleside Club hotel near Scottsdale (in what is now Arcadia), laying the foundation for the area's vital tourism economy. Several resorts – The Phoenician, Biltmore, Royal Palms, a Pointe Hilton and a Ritz-Carlton – were all built close to the canal between 1929 and 1988. Also, five shopping malls of varying size and affluence – Borgata, Scottsdale Fashion Square, Biltmore Fashion Park, Metrocenter Mall and Arrowhead Towne Center – now reside along the canal's route. Five miles were added to the canal's western end in 1894, completing its 47-mile (76 km) length.

A 750-kilowatt restored hydroelectric plant and art display opened in June 2003 in Arcadia, at a natural 20-foot (6.1 m) drop called Arizona Falls.

Scottsdale's Waterfront Project is aimed at revitalizing an area along the Arizona Canal just west of Scottsdale Road. The City of Scottsdale and the Scottsdale Public Art board engaged the architect Paolo Soleri who designed a bridge over the Arizona Canal in Downtown Scottsdale. The suspension bridge has two steel-clad, 64-foot pylons create a light beam on the walking surface to mark solar events. The bridge will direct pedestrians, bicyclists, and horse riders moving north and south along the Arizona Canal system.

== See also ==
- List of rivers of Arizona
