= Carlos Dorrien =

American sculptor of Mexican descent

Carlos Dorrien (1948-2026, born in Buenos Aires, Argentina) was an American sculptor of Mexican descent.

== Biography ==
He studied at Montserrat School of Visual Art (now Montserrat College of Art) and at Massachusetts College of Art. He later joined the faculty of Wellesley College, where he taught for many years.

Dorrien specialized in public art installations, creating large-sized abstract sculptures in granite that are often inspired by ancient history, architecture, archaeological ruins, and human figures. They are often designed to be placed in nature. His work is scattered throughout New England, including the DeCordova Museum in Massachusetts, Grounds for Sculpture in New Jersey, South Boston Maritime Park, Harvard Square, MBTA Alewife station, Lowell, and several other locations in the greater Boston area; most recently, at the Stamford Courthouse in Stamford, Connecticut.

== Partial list of works ==
- Le Sombre (The Shadow) (2005)
- Justice (2005), entry plaza at the Stamford Courthouse, Stamford, Connecticut
- Little Red Riding Hood and Other Stories (2000), DeCordova Museum, Lincoln, Massachusetts
- The Alewife Gateway (1997), Minuteman Bikeway, (north side of the MBTA Alewife station), Cambridge, Massachusetts
- The Nine Muses (1990–97), Grounds for Sculpture, Hamilton Township, Mercer County, New Jersey
- Human Construction (1989), Citicorp Plaza (Figueroa & 7th Streets), Lowell
- Archival Stone (1989), courtyard of the Massachusetts State Archives
- No.7 (1987), DeCordova Museum, Lincoln, Massachusetts
- Quiet Cornerstone (1986), Winthrop Park (J.F. Kennedy & Mt. Auburn Streets), Harvard Square, Cambridge, Massachusetts
- The Gateway, South Boston Maritime Park, Boston, Massachusetts
- Ontas, station entrance of MBTA Porter Square station, Cambridge, Massachusetts
