= Granite Reef Diversion Dam =

Dam located northeast of Phoenix, Arizona, United States

Granite Reef Dam
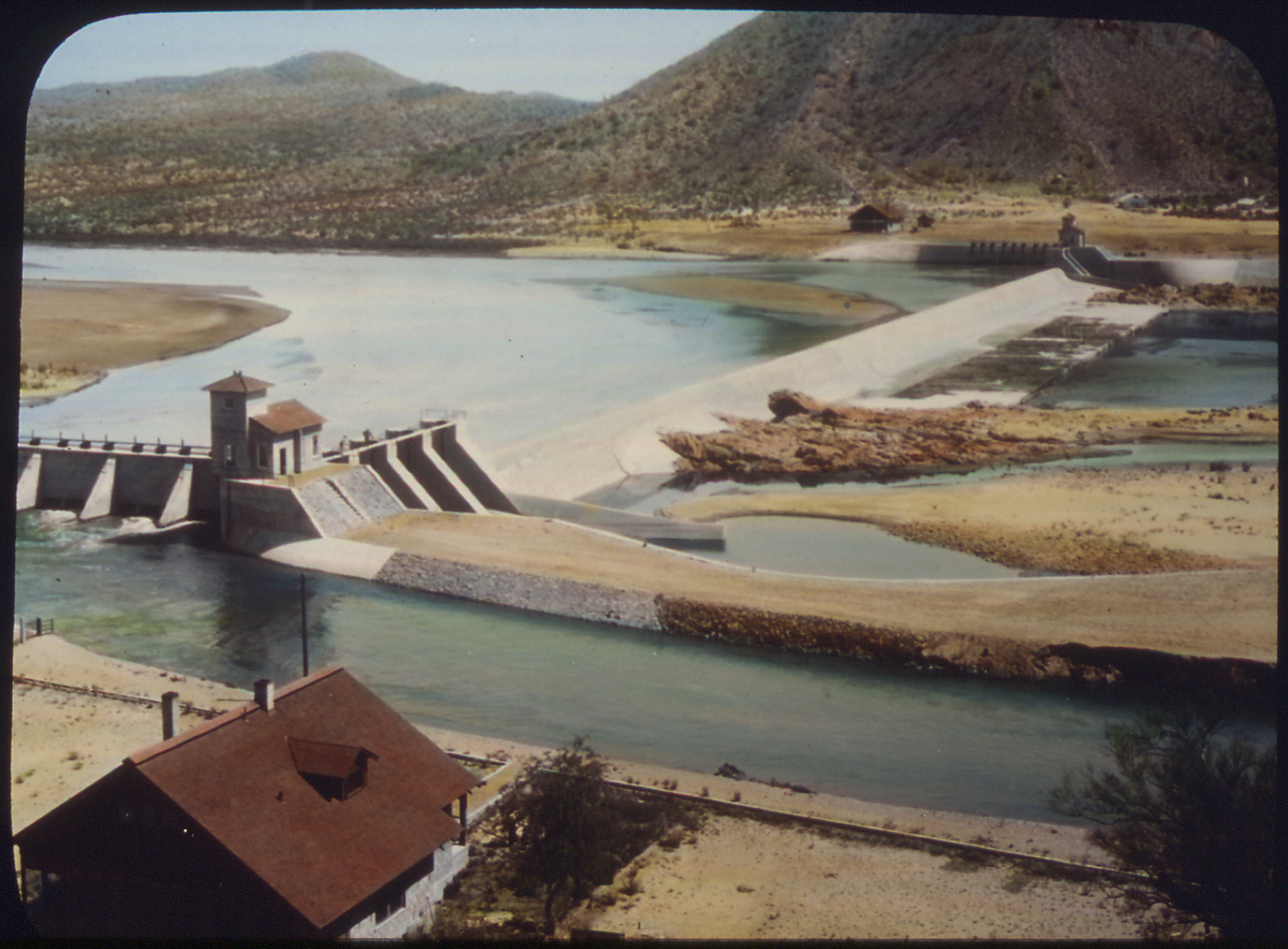
- Arizona Dam in c. 1903

- Location within Arizona Location within the United States
- Official name: Granite Reef Diversion Dam
- Coordinates: 33°30′58″N 111°41′28″W
- Purpose: Irrigation
- Construction began: 1906
- Opening date: 1908

Dam and spillways
- Height (foundation): 29 feet (8.8 m)
- Length: 1,128 feet (344 m)
- Dam volume: 35,000 cubic yards (27,000 m^{3})

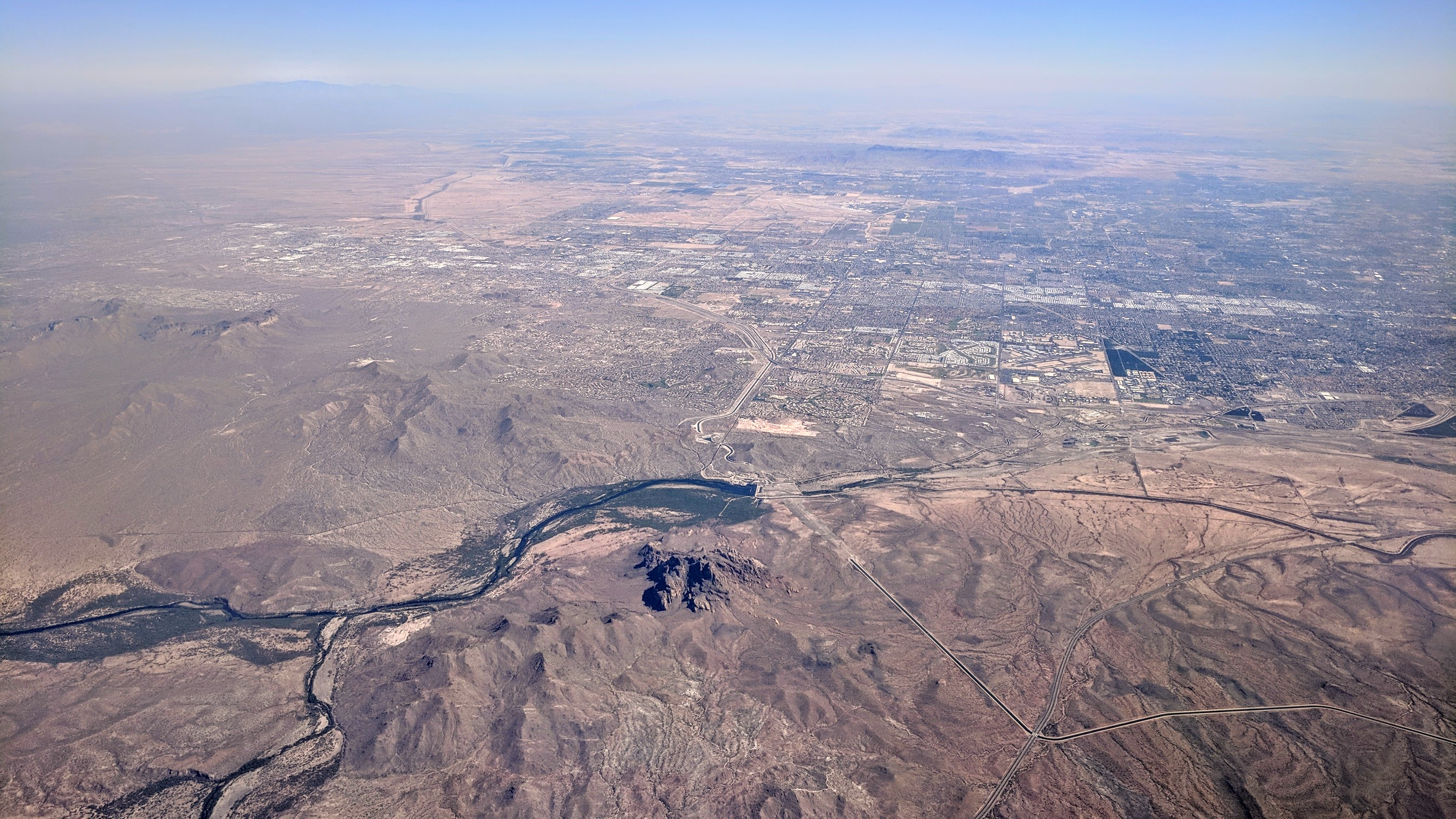
Aerial view of the dam, river, and canals in 2018

The Granite Reef Diversion Dam is a concrete diversion dam located 22 miles (35 km) Northeast of Phoenix, Arizona. It impounds the Salt River for irrigation purposes. If it were to overflow, more than half of the Yavapai Reservation would be flooded.

The dam diverts nearly all water from the Salt River into the Arizona and South Canals, which serve metropolitan Phoenix with irrigation and drinking water. The Salt River below Granite Reef is usually dry except following consistent and heavy upstream precipitation. When upstream lakes are full, minor and moderate releases are accomplished via floodgates at either end of the dam. The dam is designed to be overtopped by major releases, which can occur every 10 to 40 years.

The dam is 1,128 feet (344 m) long, 29 feet (8.8 m) high. Its volume is 35,000 cubic yards (27,000 m^{3}).

The United States Bureau of Reclamation built the dam between 1906 and 1908 to replace Arizona Dam washed out in 1905. It is operated by the Salt River Project, an electric cooperative.
