= Mags Harries and Lajos Héder =

Public artists

Mags Harries and Lajos Héder are artists working collaboratively to create public art across the United States from their studio.

== Career ==
A married couple, they formed Harries/Héder Collaborative in 1990 and have worked together on major public art commissions since then. Based in Cambridge, Massachusetts, they have completed over thirty public projects with budgets up to $6 million. They designed Acoustic Weir in Cambridge, Massachusetts.

== Biographies ==
Mags Harries (born 1945), a Welsh sculptor born in Wales, attended Leicester College of Art before immigrating to the United States to study at Southern Illinois University. She teaches at the School of the Museum of Fine Arts, Boston on sculpture, installation, and public art. Her 1976 work Asaroton was installed in Boston. She created the Glove Cycle installation at a Boston subway station in 1984. Two of her untitled 1972 prints are held by Harvard Art Museums, and a 1975 charcoal on paper work Theater is held by Museum of Fine Arts, Boston.

Lajos Héder, an artist born in Hungary, studied architecture and urban planning at Harvard University. Before forming Harries/Héder Collaborative, he worked on community projects, urban design, site planning, architecture, and construction. He was the principal author of the US Department of Transportation's Aesthetics in Transportation (1980).

They have two daughters, writer/director Sian Heder and author/artist Thyra Heder.

== Selected works ==
- Wall Cycle to Ocotillo (1992), Phoenix, Arizona
- Miramar Park, Florida (2000)
- City at the Falls, Commonwealth Convention Center, Louisville, Kentucky (2000) design team artists
- Drawn Water, Cambridge Water Department, Cambridge, Massachusetts (2001) design team artist
- WaterWorks at Arizona Falls, Arizona Falls, Phoenix, Arizona (2003) design team artists
- The Benefit of Mr. Kite, San Diego Port Authority, San Diego, California (2003)
- Connections, [Central Connecticut State University], New Britain, Connecticut (2005)
- Arbors and Ghost Trees, Baseline Road, Phoenix, Arizona (2005) with Ten Eyck Landscape Architects
- Terra Fugit, Miramar Park, Fort Lauderdale, Florida (2006) design team artists
- The Big Question, Des Moines Science Museum, Des Moines, Iowa (2007)
- Concord River Greenway Trail Master Plan, Lowell, Massachusetts (2007)
- A MoonTide Garden, International Ferry Terminal, Portland, Maine (2007)
- Solar Light Raft, Havana Square, Stapleton, Colorado (2008)
- Sun Flowers, an Electric Garden, Mueller Development, Austin, Texas (2009)
- History Colorado Center, Denver, Colorado (2009)
- Zanjero's Line, Highline Canal, Phoenix, Arizona (2010) with Ten Eyck Landscape Architects
- Terpsichore for Kansas City, Arts District Parking Garage, Kansas City, Missouri (2011) with David Moulton, Roberta Vacca, Bobby Watson
- Xixi Umbrellas, Xixi Wetland Park, Hangzhou, China (2012) Westlake International Invitational Sculpture Exhibition
- Meeting Place, The Downtown Greenway, Greensboro, North Carolina (2014)
