= Lovell Block =

- U.S. National Register of Historic Places
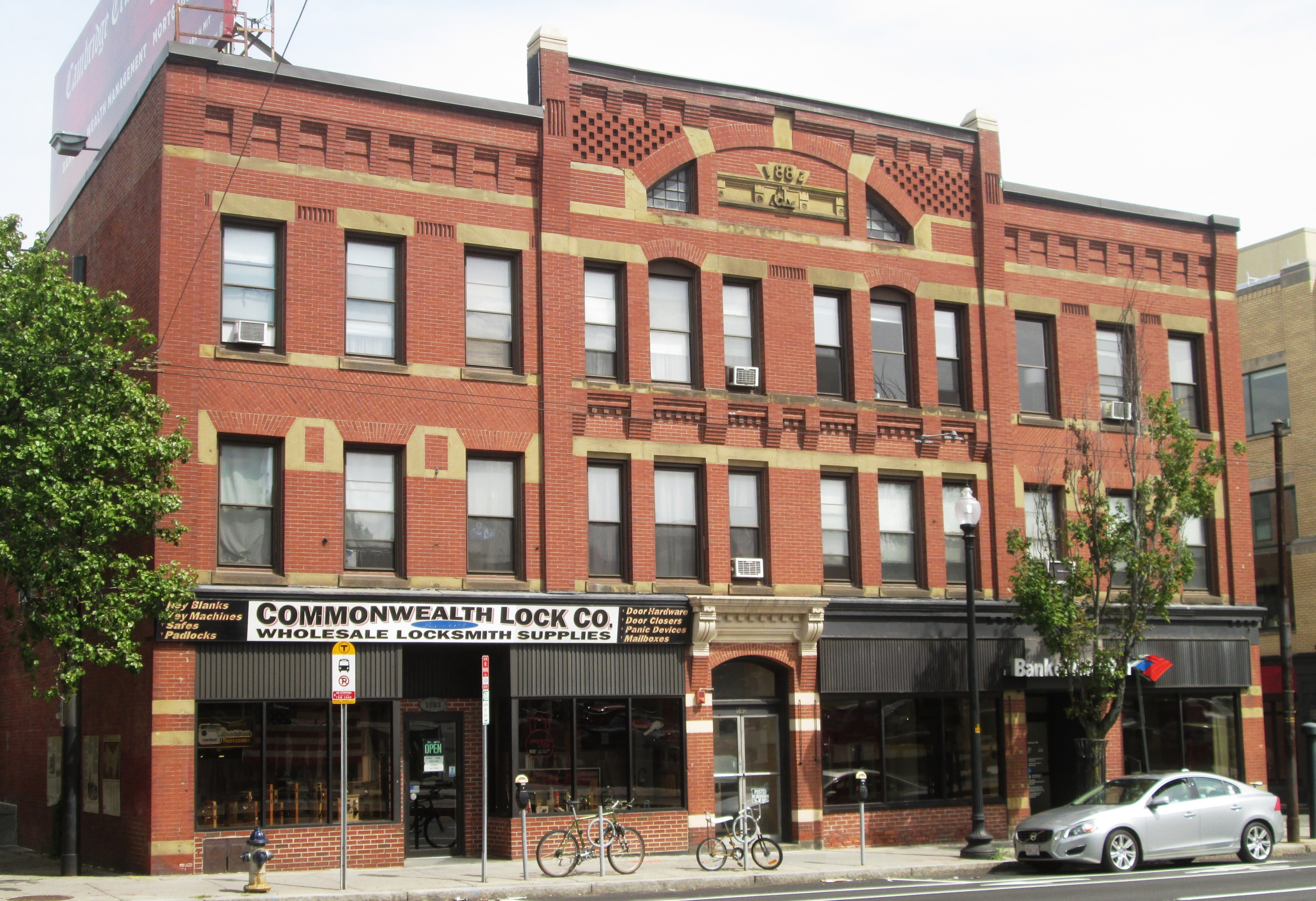
- (2017)

- Location within Massachusetts Location within the United States
- Location: Cambridge, Massachusetts
- Coordinates: 42°23′16.1″N 71°7′8.4″W
- Built: 1882
- Architectural style: Queen Anne
- MPS: Cambridge MRA
- NRHP reference No.: 83000814
- Added to NRHP: June 30, 1983

The Lovell Block is an historic residential and commercial building at 1853 Massachusetts Avenue in Cambridge, Massachusetts. The three-story brick building was built in 1882 by Andrew Jackson Lovell, with two specific commercial tenants in mind. One was his own grocery business, and the other was the North Cambridge Post Office. The upper floors contained a total of four well-appointed residential flats. The building was an early instance of a mixed-use residential-commercial structure, at a time when most lower-income housing was tenement-style, and the idea of higher-quality residential rental property was relatively new.

The block was listed on the National Register of Historic Places in 1983.

== See also ==
- National Register of Historic Places listings in Cambridge, Massachusetts
