= Arcadia (Phoenix) =

Neighborhood in Phoenix, Arizona

Coordinates: 33°29′53″N 111°57′39″W

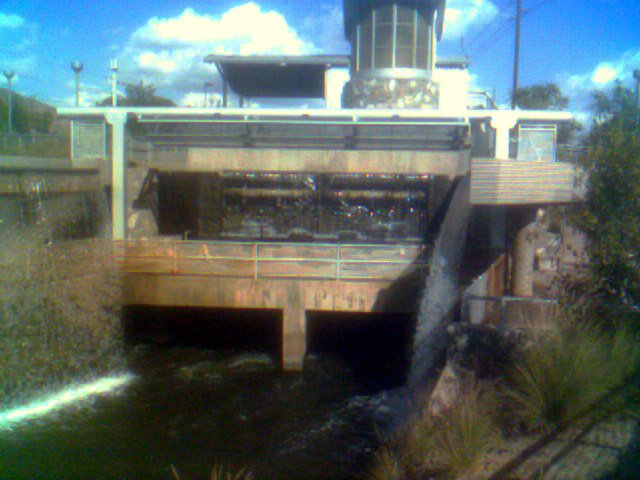
Along the Arizona Canal in Phoenix, a 750-kilowatt restored hydroelectric plant and art display opened in June 2003 in Arcadia at a natural 20-foot drop called Arizona Falls.

Arcadia is a neighborhood in the areas of Phoenix and Scottsdale, Arizona. The neighborhood is located at the south foot of Camelback Mountain. It has boundaries from 44th Street to 68th Street and Camelback Road to the Arizona canal. Arcadia is adjacent to the upscale suburbs of Paradise Valley, the Biltmore area, Scottsdale and north Phoenix.

The area was originally developed for citrus groves. In order to provide water to the neighborhood from the Arizona Canal, the Arcadia Water Company (AWC) was founded in 1919. By 1924, the AWC had built several water pumping stations and 15 miles of concrete piping to provide sufficient irrigation. The area was occupied by citrus farmers from 1919 to the mid-1950s. After this period, the area was suburbanized with characteristic ranch homes on large lots. Arcadia is known for well-irrigated, mature landscaping and yards feature orange, lemon and grapefruit trees as reminders of the area's past.

Arcadia High School serves and derives its name from the neighborhood.

Scenes in the 2010 movie Everything Must Go starring Will Ferrell were filmed in Arcadia.
