= Granite Point, Maine =

Coordinates: 43°24′29.0″N 70°23′10.6″W

Granite Point, Maine is a coastal residential neighborhood of Biddeford, Maine located on the border of the town of Kennebunkport (bounded by the Little River). It is approximately 85 miles north of Boston, Massachusetts.

Granite Point is a common site for the release of seals who have been rescued from New England beaches and rehabilitated at the University of New England in Biddeford, and the New England Aquarium in Boston, Massachusetts.
