= John Winthrop Chambers =

Historic residential building in Massachusetts, United States

- The John Winthrop Chambers
- U.S. National Register of Historic Places
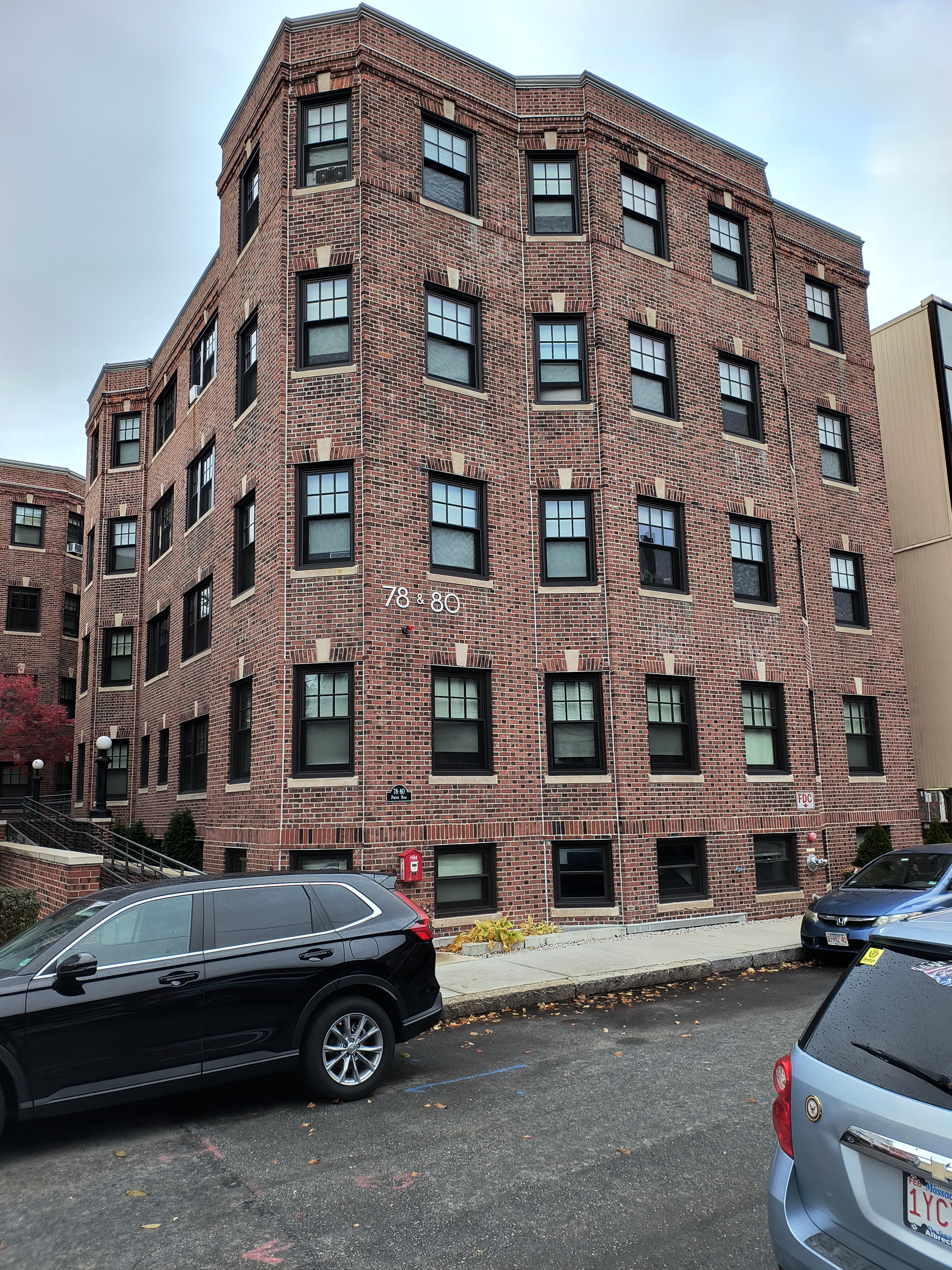

- Location within Massachusetts Location within the United States
- Location: 78-80 Porter Rd., Cambridge, Massachusetts
- Coordinates: 42°23′23″N 71°7′16″W
- Area: less than one acre
- Built: 1915
- Architectural style: Colonial Revival
- NRHP reference No.: 100009286
- Added to NRHP: August 22, 2023

The John Winthrop Chambers, also known historically as the Brooks Apartments, is a historic apartment house at 78-80 Porter Road in Cambridge, Massachusetts. The building was listed on the National Register of Historic Places in 2023. Built in 1915, it is a significant local example of residential Colonial Revival architecture, and an early example of the large courtyard-style apartment block in the Porter Square neighborhood of Cambridge. It was listed on the National Register of Historic Places in 2023.

== Description and history ==
The John Winthrop Chambers building is located in the Porter Square neighborhood of Cambridge, on the west side of Porter Street just south of its western junction with Massachusetts Avenue. It is a four-story L-shaped structure, finished in red brick with Colonial Revival styling. It presents a side of the building to the street, with two main entrances in a courtyard area on the south side. The entrances are set at angles in the corners of the rectangular courtyard, framed by stone pilasters topped by peaked stone lintels.

The building was constructed in 1915 on land where the Porter's Hotel originally stood until its demolition in 1912. It was built by William F. Brooks, a prominent local real estate developer who served as mayor of Cambridge from 1908 to 1911. At the time of its construction, it was one of only a few courtyard-style apartment block in all of North Cambridge. In 2009 it was purchased by the local housing authority, which has rehabilitated its interior for use as affordable housing in 2021. During the rehabilitation, interior layout and exterior features were either retained or replicated to maintain its historic character.

== See also ==
- National Register of Historic Places listings in Cambridge, Massachusetts
