= Echo of the Waves =

Sculpture in Boston, Massachusetts, U.S.

- Artist: Susumu Shingu
- Condition: Removed from site
- Location: Boston, Massachusetts, United States; 42.359051°N 71.050733°W

Echo of the Waves (also known as Dolphin or Whale) is a sculpture by Susumu Shingu, installed outside the New England Aquarium, in Boston, Massachusetts, United States. It was completed in September 1981, and dedicated on July 6, 1983. The abstract, kinetic structure is made of painted steel and Teflon coated fiberglass, and rests on a painted steel base. It was surveyed as part of the Smithsonian Institution's "Save Outdoor Sculpture!" program in 1994. The sculpture was removed from the aquarium's plaza during the 1998 expansion.
