= Porter Square =

Public square in Massachusetts

Coordinates: 42.3886°N 71.1194°W

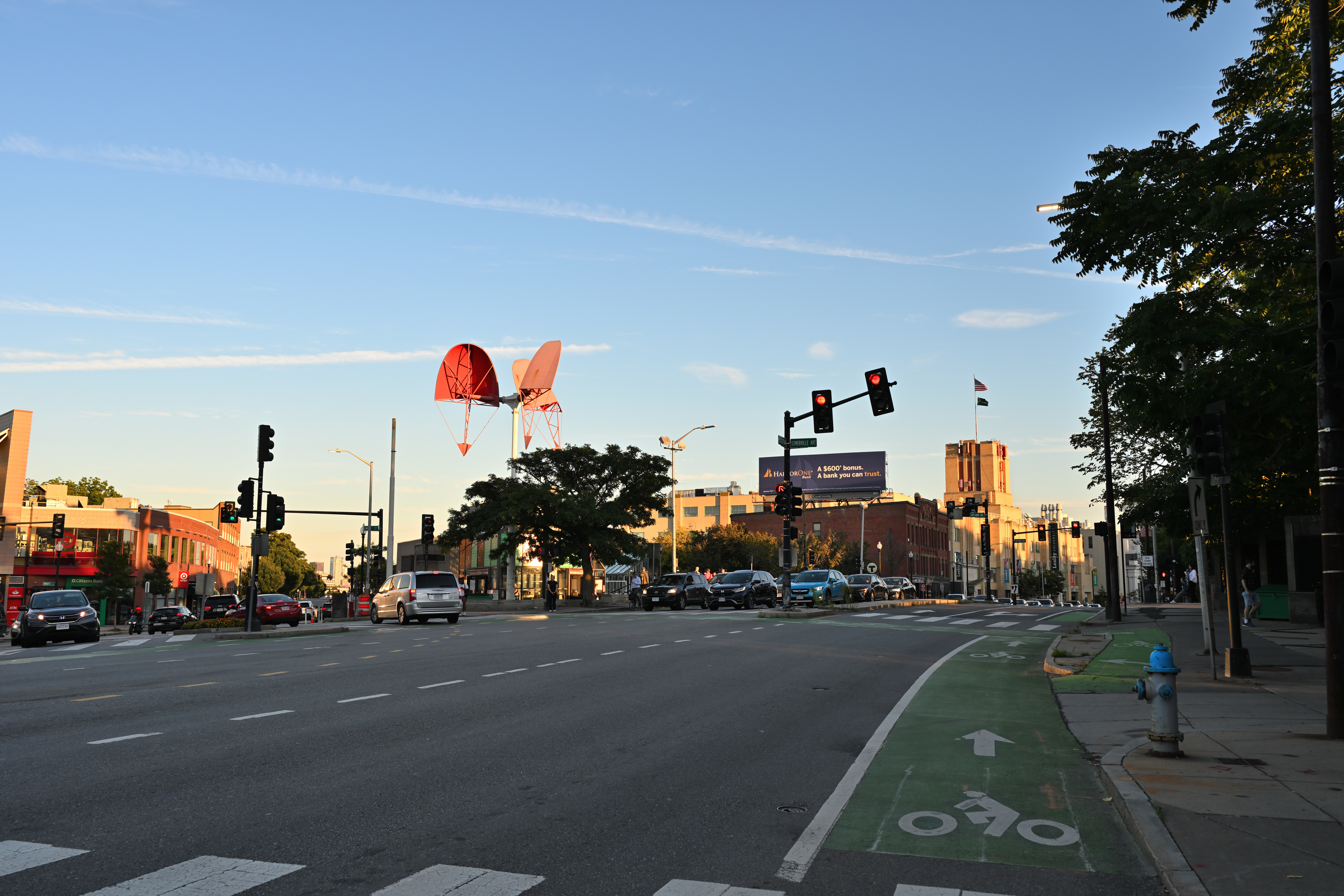
Porter Square, looking south. The Gift of the Wind kinetic sculpture, the most prominent landmark of the square, is on the center-left.

Porter Square is a neighborhood in Cambridge and Somerville, Massachusetts, located around the intersection of Massachusetts Avenue and Somerville Avenue, between Harvard and Davis Squares. The Porter Square station serves both the MBTA Red Line and the Commuter Rail Fitchburg Line. A major part of the Lesley University campus is located within the Porter Square area.

In 2004–06 the principal intersection, including the area adjacent to the shopping center, underwent extensive construction both to improve access for vehicles, pedestrians, bicyclists, and mass transit users, and to improve drainage and storm water conditions. The artist Toshihiro Katayama of Harvard University, in conjunction with the landscape architect Cynthia Smith, designed a new visual look for the new circulation design, including contrasting light and dark concrete paving, stone walls and boulders.

== History ==
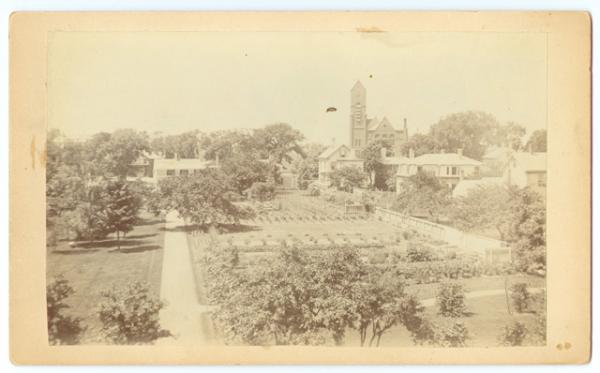
The Rand Estate, on site of what is now Porter Square Shopping Center, 1900 or earlier

Previously called Union Square, Porter Square was renamed in 1896 after Porter's Hotel to reduce confusion with Union Square in Somerville. The hotel was operated by Zachariah B. Porter and is one possible origin of the porterhouse steak. The hotel was demolished in 1909. The square, formerly flanked by cattle yards that used the Porter rail head to transport their beef throughout the US, was an important center for commerce and light industry as early as the late 18th century. A tunnel for moving cattle to and from the railroad without interfering with street traffic, known as the Walden Street Cattle Pass, was built in 1857. The tunnel survives under the nearby Walden Street Bridge, and in 2007–08 was preserved and restored. The "most dramatic loss" of early 19th century landscape in the square was the leveling of the old Rand Estate in 1952 to make way for the Porter Square Shopping Center.

In 1984 the Red Line was extended from Harvard through Porter and Davis Square to its present terminus at Alewife, a project that also left Porter with its most visible landmark, Susumu Shingu's 46-foot painted steel and aluminum kinetic sculpture, Gift of the Wind.

== Lesley University ==
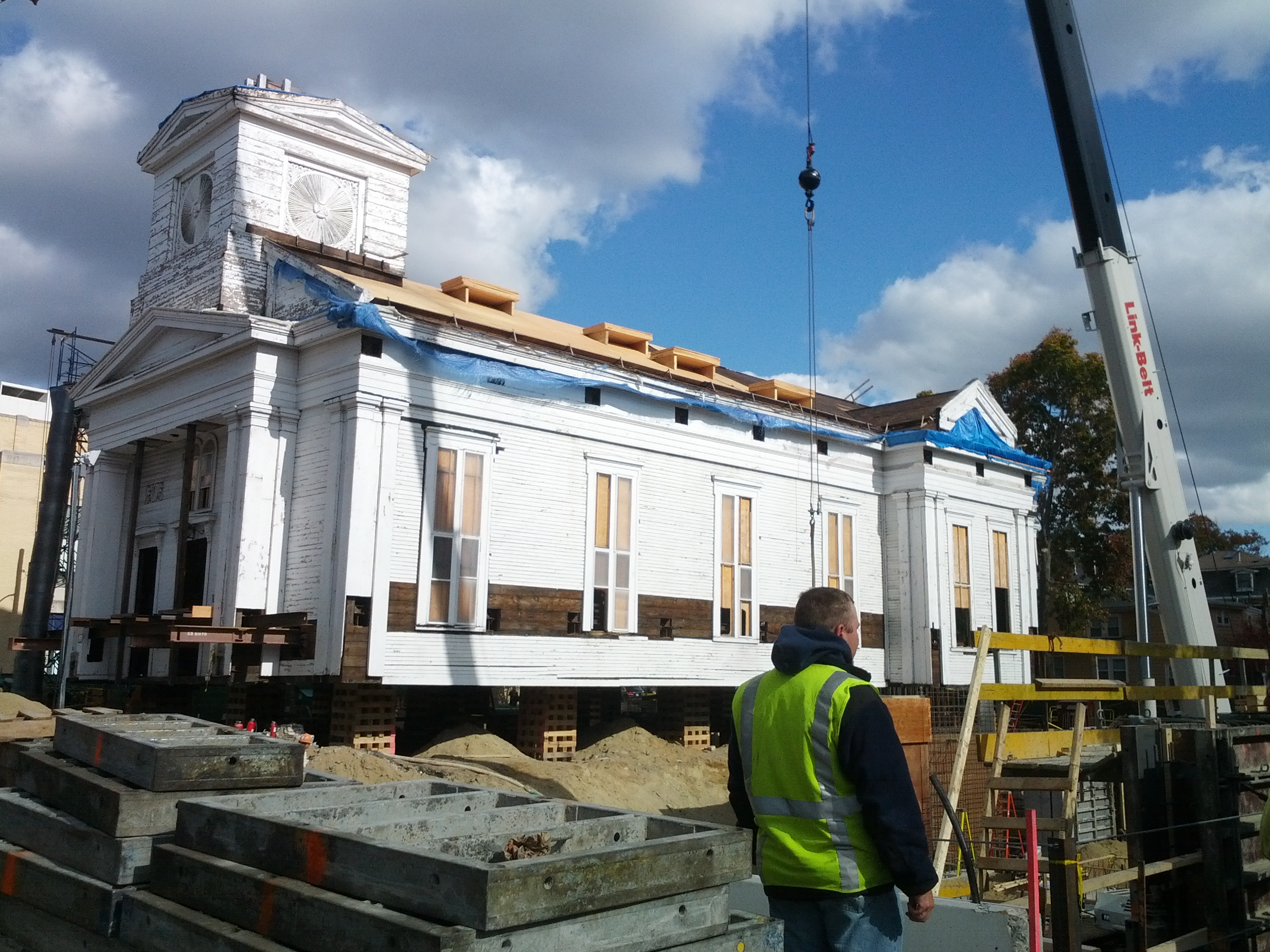
Workers prepare to relocate the North Prospect Church, future home of Lesley University's College of Art and Design

Lesley University continues to expand in the Porter Square neighborhood, with the relocation of its College of Art and Design to the North Prospect Church and a new building built on the church's former site at the corner of Massachusetts Avenue and Roseland Street.

In addition to University Hall at 1815 Massachusetts Avenue and the Lunder Arts Center at 1801 Massachusetts Avenue, Lesley also has administrative offices at 815 Somerville Avenue and parking areas across Massachusetts Avenue from University Hall.

== Shopping ==
=== Porter Square Shopping Center ===
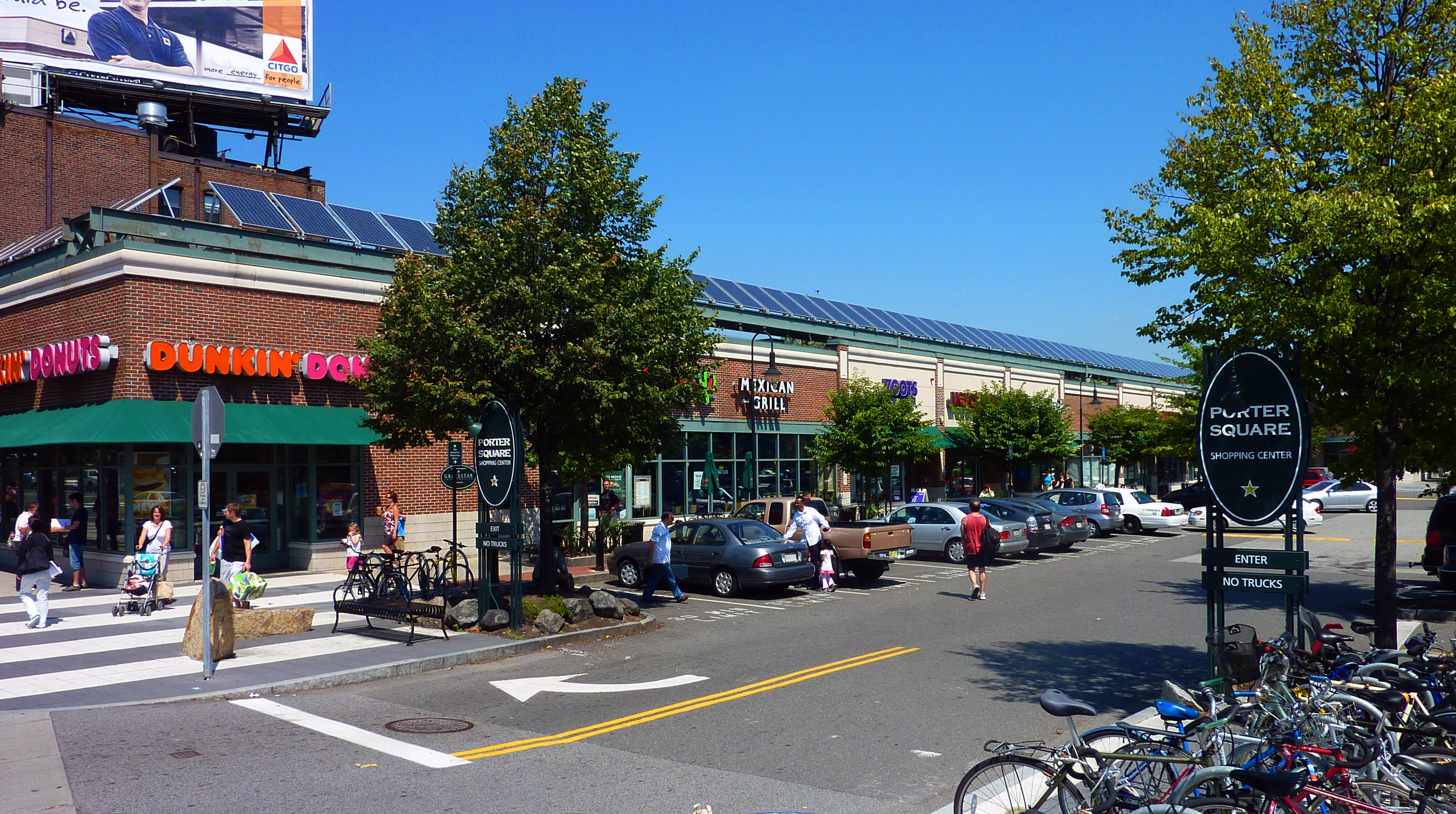
Porter Square Shopping Center, 2009

The Porter Square Shopping Center consists of two buildings and a parking lot.

=== Porter Square Galleria ===
Adjacent to the Porter Square Shopping Center is a small mall called the Porter Square Galleria. In recent years it has lost several large tenants. A Target has been built in the space formerly occupied by Walgreens.

=== The Shops at Porter ===
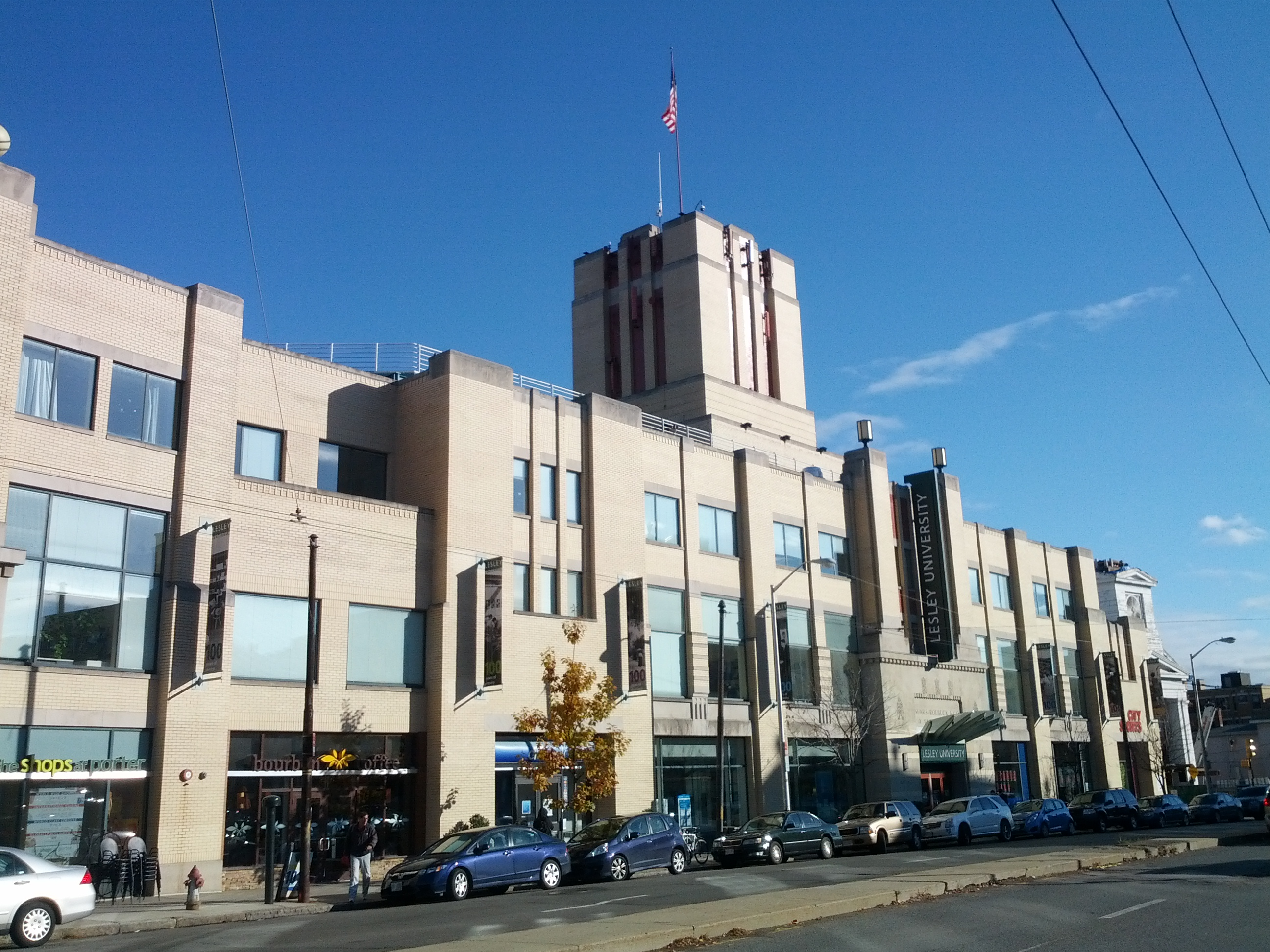
University Hall

A prominent feature of the Porter Square skyline is the tower on the Art Deco-style building located at 1815 Massachusetts Avenue. The building, now known as University Hall, was originally a Sears, Roebuck store from 1928 to 1985. In 1991, Lesley University began leasing classroom space there, and in 1994 the university bought the building, which now houses its Graduate School of Education, bookstore, administrative offices, art and dance studios, and classrooms.
