= Gift of the Wind =

Public kinetic sculpture in Cambridge, Massachusetts, U.S.

Coordinates: 42°23′18.65″N 71°07′09.4″W

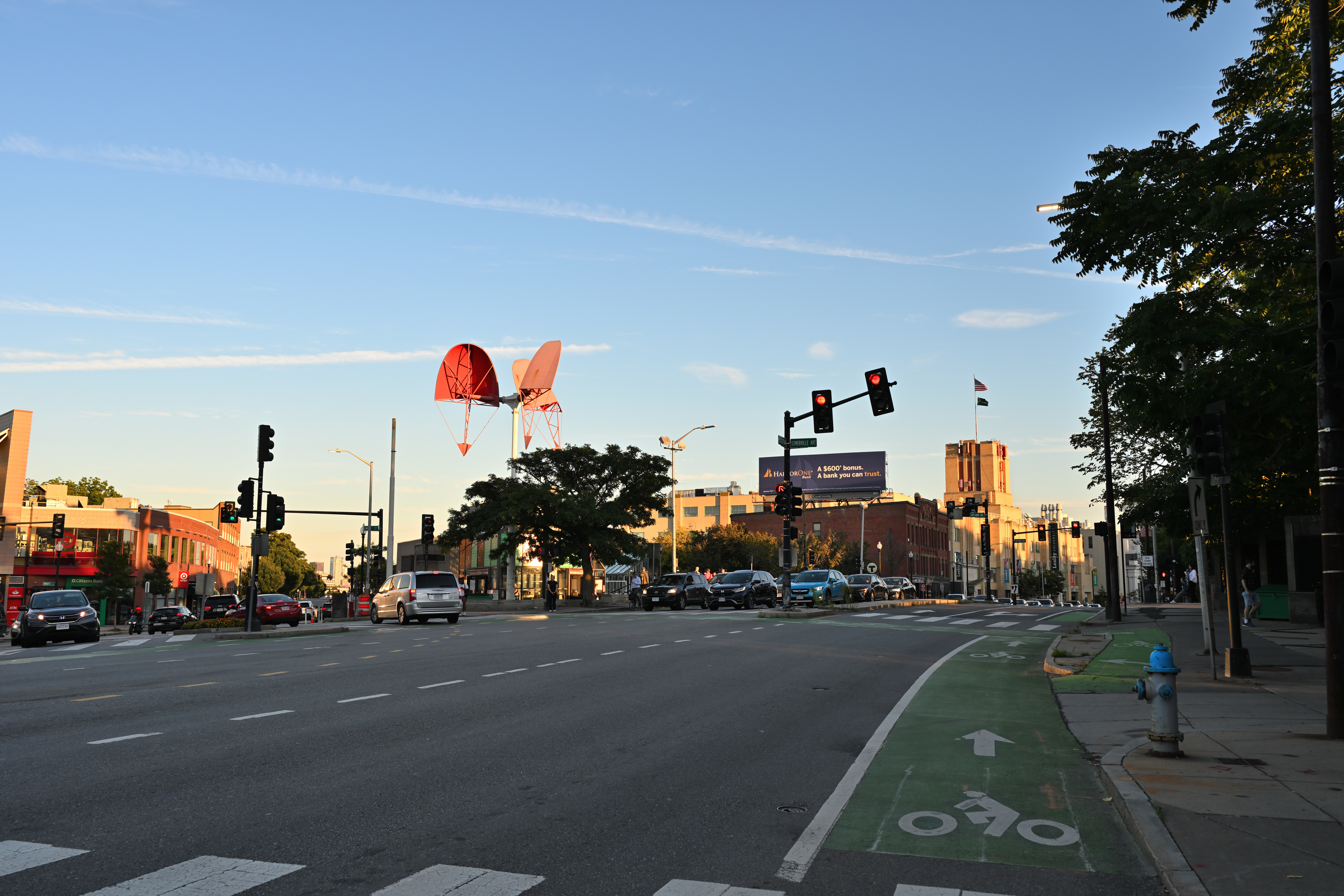
- Pictured left of center
- Artist: Susumu Shingu
- Year: 1985
- Type: steel, aluminum
- Dimensions: 14 m × 7.0 m (46 ft × 23 ft)
- Location: Porter station; Cambridge, Massachusetts
- Owner: Massachusetts Bay Transportation Authority

Gift of the Wind is a large-scale public kinetic sculpture, by Susumu Shingu, located in Porter Square, Cambridge, Massachusetts, at the Porter subway and commuter rail station. The artwork consists of a tall white pole with three red "wings" attached to the top that are "designed to shift in response to the movement of the wind, not only turning clockwise and counterclockwise, but tumbling over and over in various sequences". It is considered by some to be "Cambridge's most visible landmark".

== History ==
Gift of the Wind was commissioned in 1983 and unveiled in 1985 as a part of the MBTA and the Cambridge Arts Council's Arts on the Line program. This first of its kind program was devised to bring art into the MBTA's planned Northwest Extension of the Red Line subway stations in the late 1970s and early 1980s, and became a model for similar drives for public art across the country. Gift of the Wind was one of 20 artworks created for this program, out of over 400 proposals submitted by artists for artworks spread out across five different newly created subway stations. The first 20 artworks, including this one, were completed with a total cost of $695,000 USD, or one-half of one percent of the total construction cost of the Red Line Northwest Extension.

Susumu Shingu designed and created his sculpture in tandem with Cambridge Seven Associates, the designers of the Porter subway station, as they designed and constructed the station. Louis Bakanowsky, the founder of Cambridge Seven, stated, "(...) the challenge of modern sculpture is not the making of closed, volumetric objects. Instead, today's sculpture must deal with issues of space, movement and address a much wider set of references... [this work will] create a resonance between the viewer's own inner rhythms and those of the larger world of nature."

Gift of the Wind was originally planned to extend down into the subway station proper. When the work rotated due to the wind, a link, through a "large light shaft" would make a selection of hammers strike chimes in the station. This concept was later abandoned.

Shingu and the MBTA disagreed about how to inspect and lubricate the sculpture. It required $40,000 of repairs in the 1990s.
