= New England Aquarium =

Aquarium in Boston, Massachusetts, US

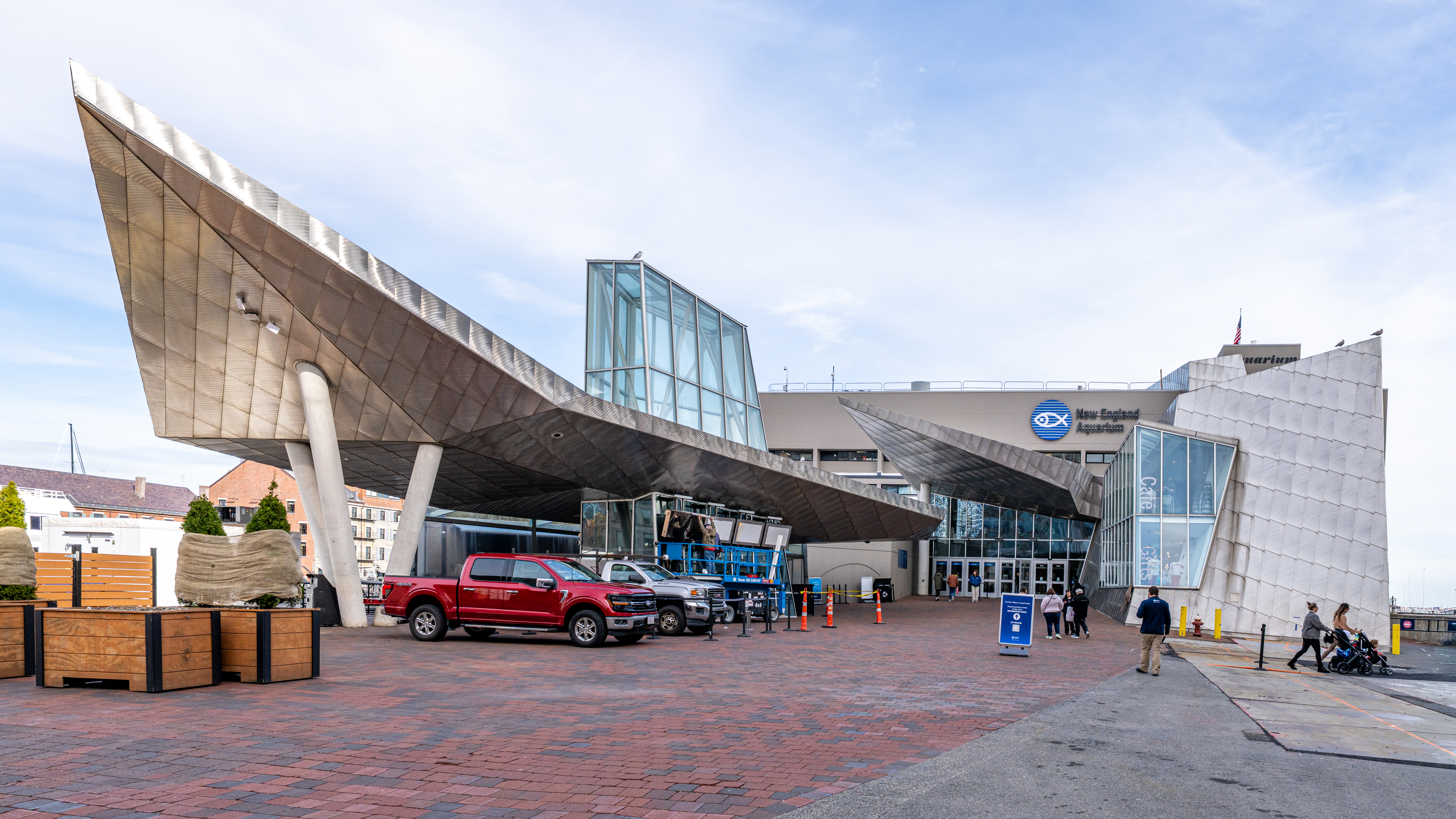
- New England Aquarium plaza (2025)
- Interactive map of New England Aquarium
- 42°21′33″N 71°2′58″W
- Slogan: Protecting the blue planet
- Date opened: June 20, 1969
- Location: Central Wharf, Boston, Massachusetts
- Land area: 75,000 square feet (7,000 m^{2})
- Volume of largest tank: 200,000 US gallons (760,000 L)
- Annual visitors: 1.3 million
- Public transit: Aquarium
- Website: www.neaq.org

The New England Aquarium is a nonprofit organization and public aquarium located in Boston, Massachusetts. The species exhibited include harbor and northern fur seals, California sea lions, African and southern rockhopper penguins, giant Pacific octopuses, loggerhead and green sea turtles, and thousands of saltwater and freshwater fishes. In addition to the main aquarium building, attractions at Central Wharf include the Simons Theatre and the New England Aquarium Whale Watch. More than 1.3 million guests visited the aquarium each year prior to the outbreak of the COVID-19 pandemic.

The Anderson Cabot Center for Ocean Life at the New England Aquarium conducts long-running research on the North Atlantic right whale, and its Quincy Animal Care Center rescues and rehabilitates hundreds of sea turtles annually.

== History ==
Boston has had multiple aquariums since the 1880s, the last before the New England Aquarium being the South Boston Aquarium at Marine Park, which closed its doors in the 1950s.

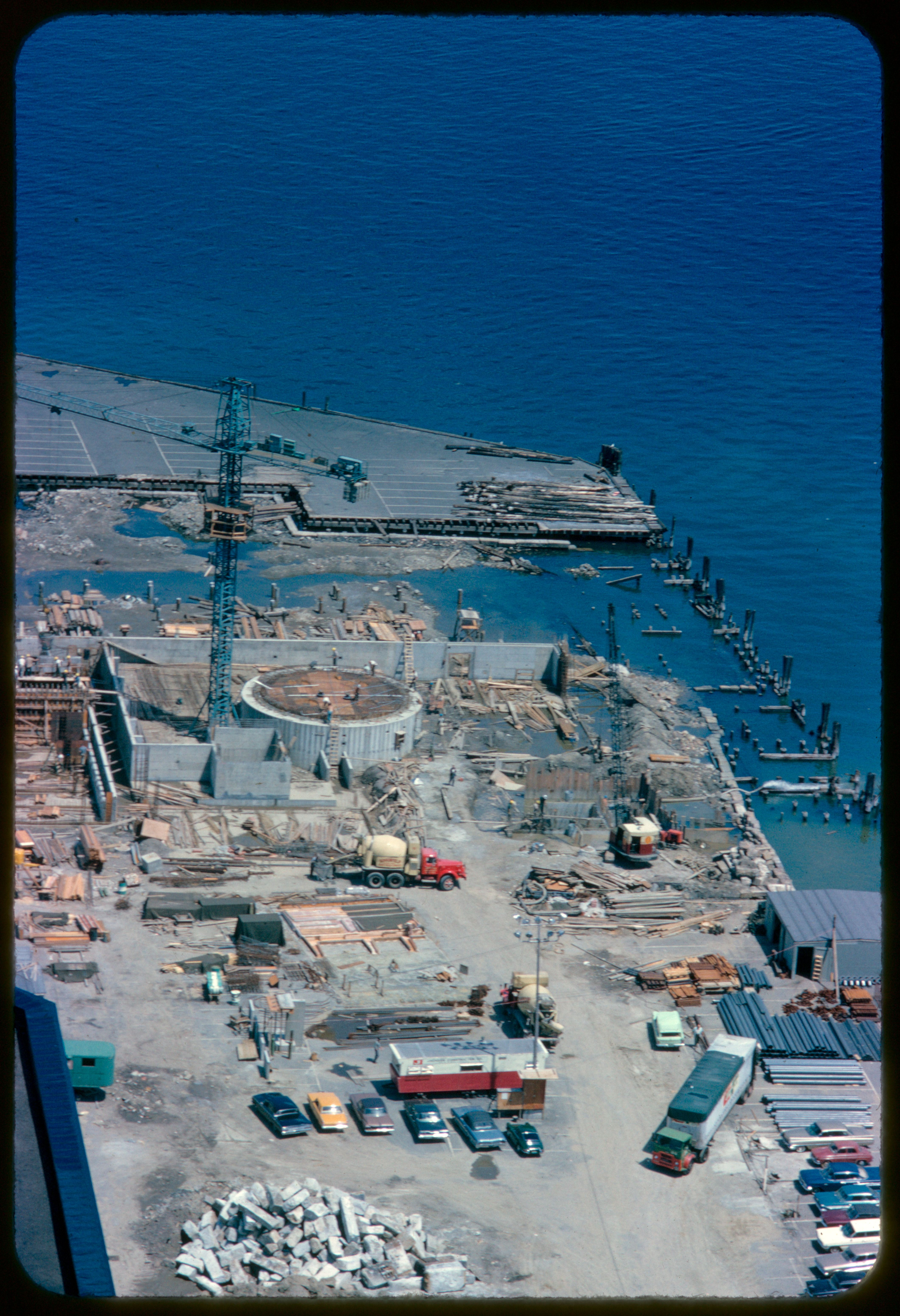
The base of the Giant Ocean Tank under construction on the decaying Central Wharf in 1966

As part of the city’s goal of revitalizing the waterfront, a new, modern aquarium, designed by Peter Chermayeff of Cambridge Seven Associates, was planned starting in 1962. David B. Stone led the project as President of the New England Aquarium Corporation. The brutalist concrete building with its cavernous interior was opened to the public in 1969. The Giant Ocean Tank, a 200,000-US-gallon (760,000 L) cylindrical exhibit made of concrete and glass, opened in 1970.

In 1974, a purpose-built, multi-storied barge, Discovery, was moored next to Central Wharf. As the aquarium’s location on the wharf limited its ability to expand, Discovery served as a floating addition containing a 1,000-seat amphitheater overlooking a 116,000-US-gallon (440,000 L) saltwater pool for marine mammals. In addition to the aquarium's first California sea lions, bottlenose dolphins performed there until they were transferred in the mid-1990s. The aging Discovery was finally decommissioned in the mid-2000s due to rising maintenance costs.

The new West Wing, designed by Schwartz/Silver Architects, was completed in 1998. The glass and steel addition to the original concrete building also included a new gift shop and the Harbor View Café.

Video of a yellowhead jawfish (Opistognathus aurifrons) at the aquarium

The 428-seat Matthew and Marcia Simons Theatre opened in 2001 in a separate building on Central Wharf designed by E. Verner Johnson and Associates. A renovation in 2020 replaced the IMAX system with a digital projector capable of showing 2D and 3D films on the theatre's new 80-foot (24 m) by 43-foot (13 m) screen. The current theatre seats 378 and has a stage for hosting special events. Also in 2020, contemporary artist Shepard Fairey designed and painted the mural A Vital and Vibrant Ocean for All, featuring a North Atlantic right whale, on the façade of the theatre.

In 2009, the New Balance Foundation Marine Mammal Center opened on the rear of the aquarium. This open-air exhibit lets guests and passersby view the aquarium's California sea lions and northern fur seals.

In 2010, the new Animal Care Center opened. The 23,000-square-foot (2,100 m^{2}) off-site facility, located in Quincy, has large tanks for holding animals during exhibit renovations, quarantining new arrivals, and rehabilitating rescued sea turtles.

In 2011, the aquarium added an Australian Great Southern Reef exhibit, featuring leafy and weedy seadragons, to the Temperate Gallery and started its own captive breeding program for the species.

In the last of $42 million in upgrades that started in 2007, the aquarium once again worked with Cambridge Seven Associates to make improvements to the Giant Ocean Tank, including an expanded coral reef, larger, acrylic viewing windows, and a more advanced lighting array. The Yawkey Coral Reef Center was also added to the viewing area at the top of the exhibit, which reopened in 2013. During the renovation, the Giant Ocean Tank's residents lived temporarily in the penguin habitat at the base of the exhibit, while the penguins were relocated to the Quincy Animal Care Center.

In 2019, the aquarium replaced the original Indo-Pacific coral reef tank in the Tropical Gallery with a new, floor-to-ceiling exhibit with an artificial coral habitat based on the Phoenix Islands Protected Area, which the aquarium helped to establish.

== Leadership ==
The current President and Chief Executive Officer of the aquarium is Vikki Spruill, who assumed the position on July 30, 2018. She serves in the role alongside Chief of Staff Kim Fontes and Chief People and Diversity Officer Lauren Hunter-Dyson. John Mandelman, Ph.D. heads the Anderson Cabot Center for Ocean Life.

== Exhibits ==
=== Giant Ocean Tank ===
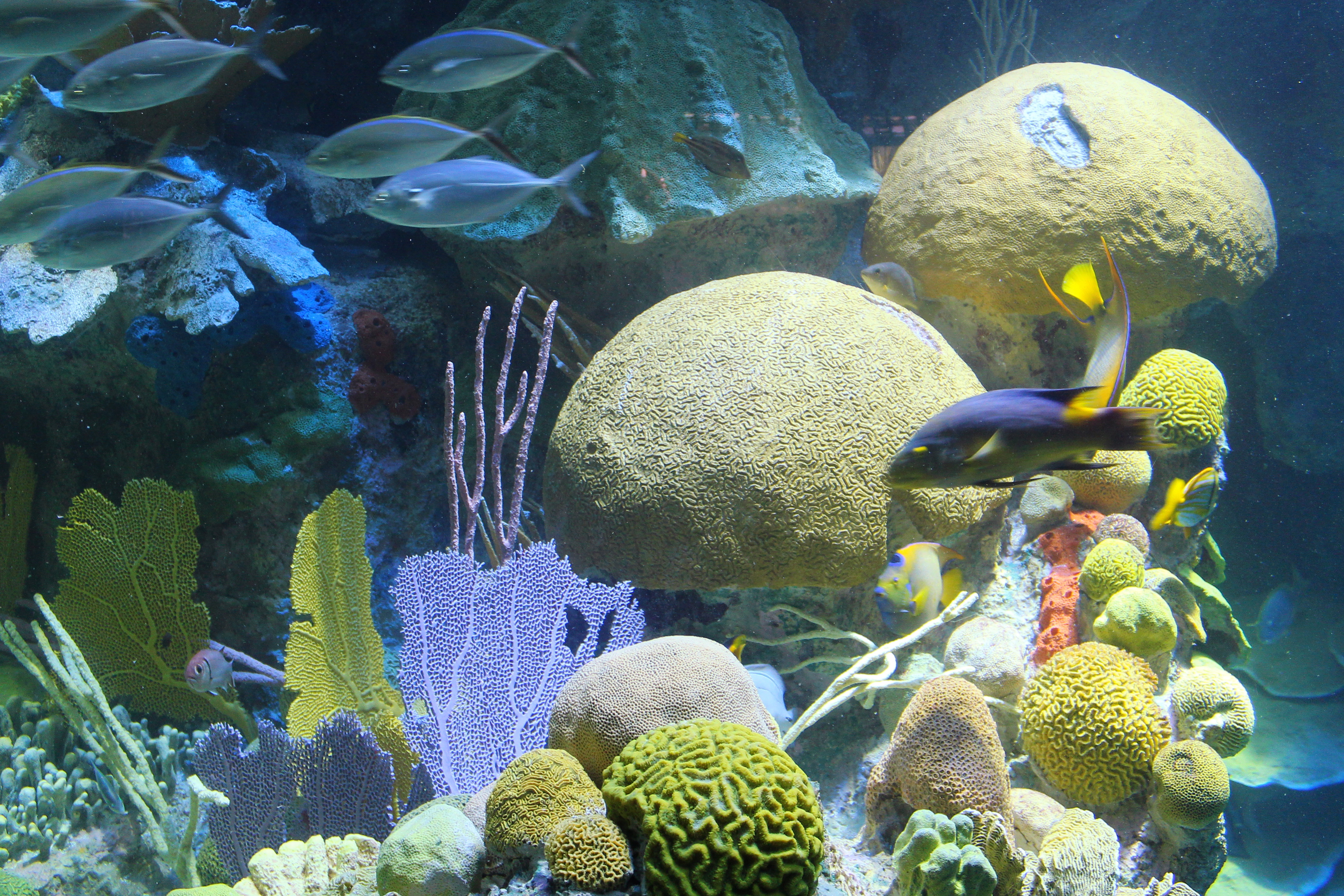
Fish swim through the coral reef in the Giant Ocean Tank.

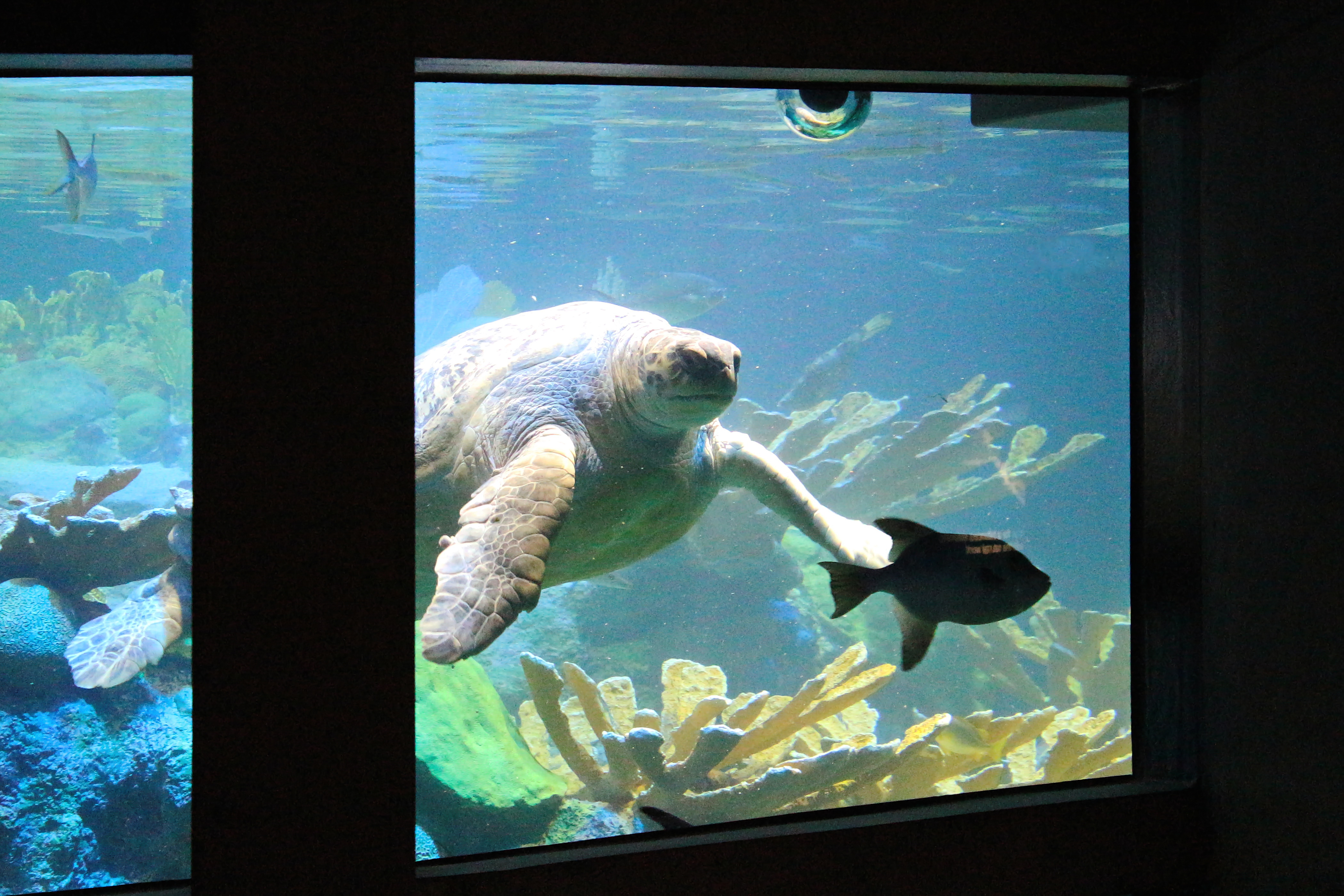
Myrtle the green sea turtle looks out of the Giant Ocean Tank

Located in the center of the main building's open atrium, the principal feature of the aquarium is the Giant Ocean Tank. This tank is a cylindrical 200,000-US-gallon (760,000 L) exhibit that simulates a Caribbean coral reef. The exhibit's permanent residents include green sea turtles (including Myrtle), loggerhead sea turtles, and hundreds of colorful tropical fish, but reef-dwelling sharks, stingrays, and moray eels may also be present. Open and accessible for viewing at the top, the concrete tank is surrounded by a spiral walkway that allows guests to see into the exhibit from every angle through 67 acrylic windows.

=== Marine Mammals ===
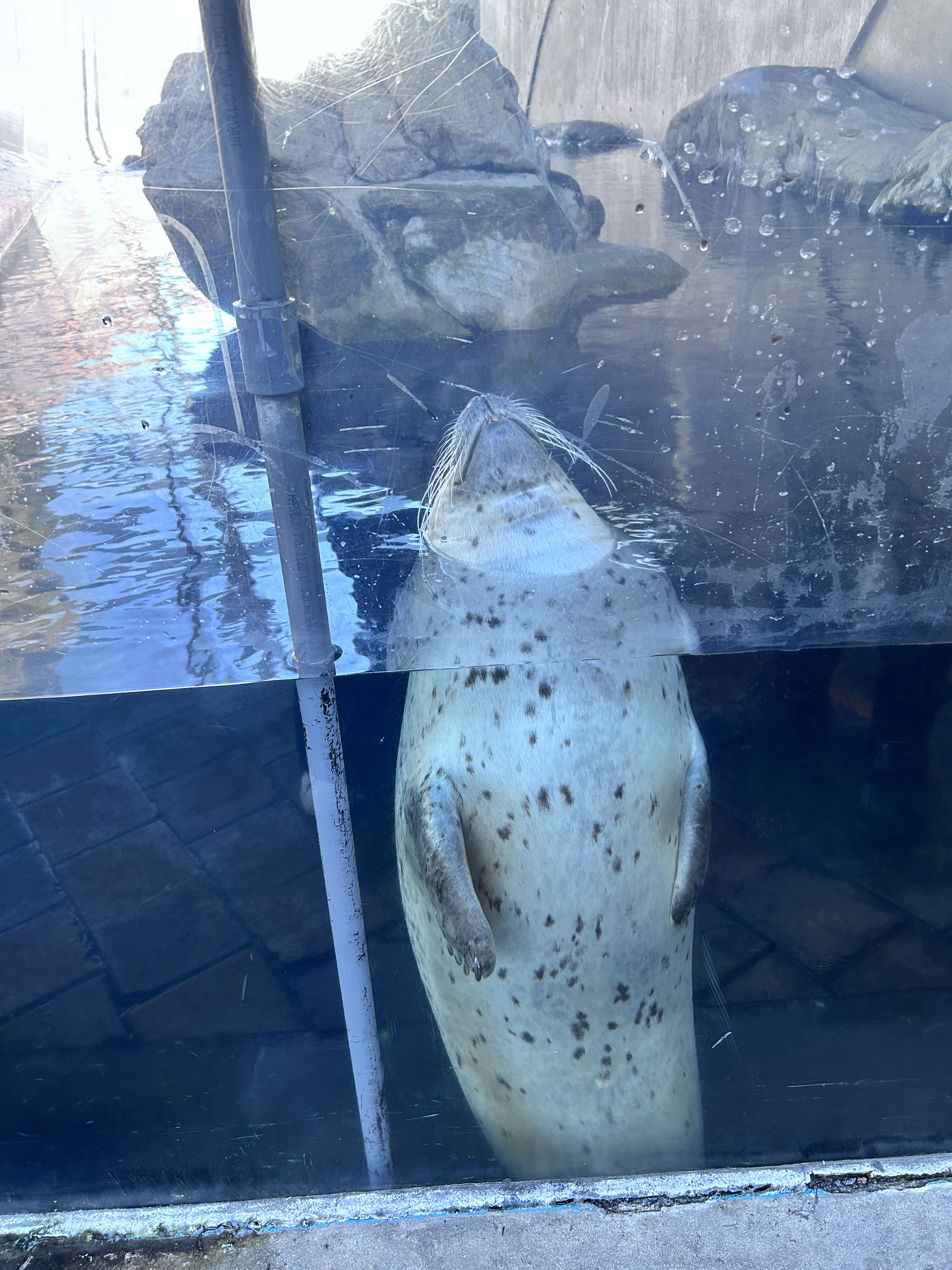
One of the Atlantic harbor seals.

The Atlantic harbor seal exhibit on the front of the main building and its five residents can be viewed for free and at any hour of the day, without entering the building. The New Balance Foundation Marine Mammal Center on the rear of the building can also be viewed from the outside (from the Harborwalk), and is home to a small colony of California sea lions and northern fur seals.

=== Penguins ===
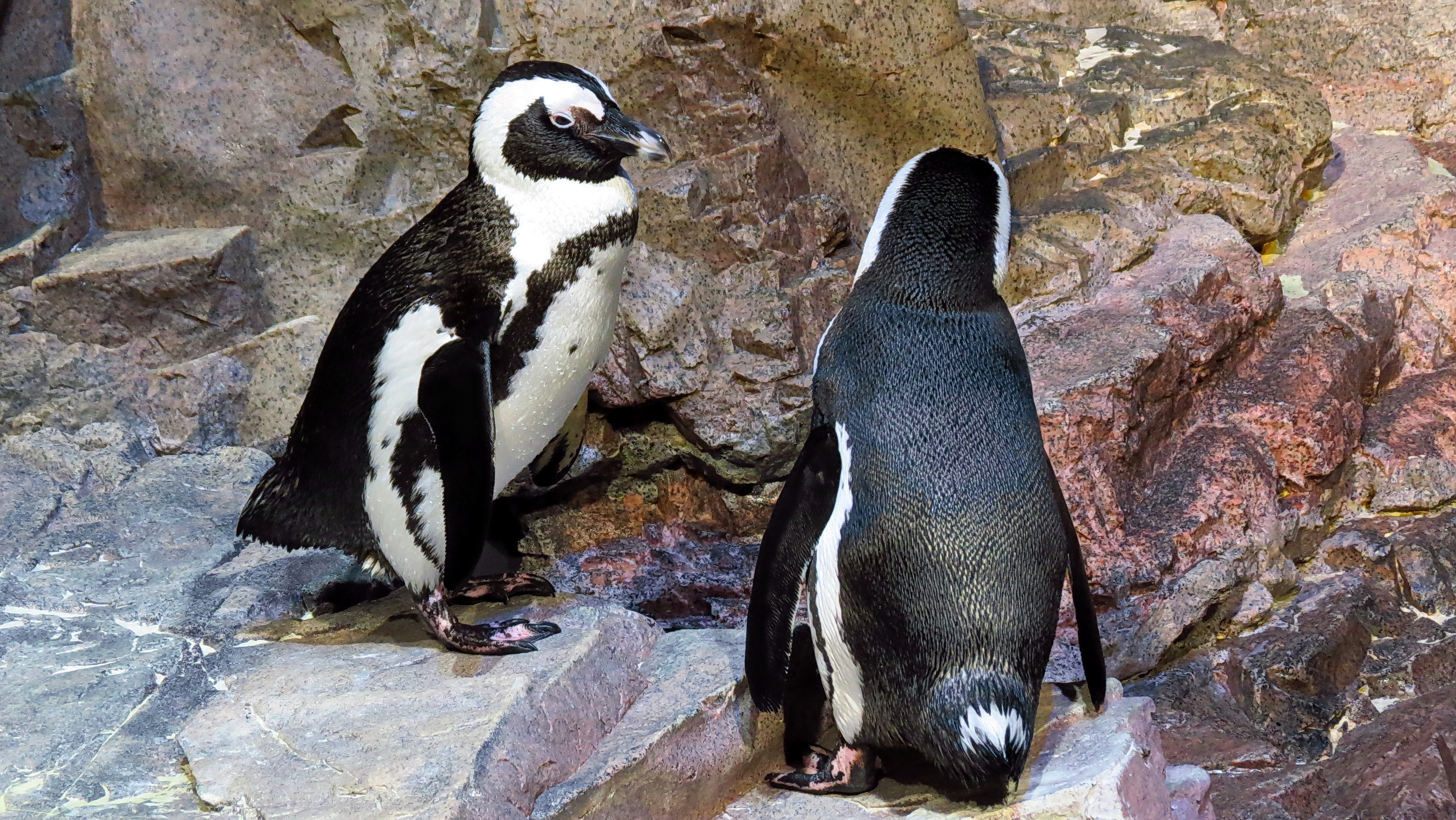
Two African penguins in the penguin exhibit

The base of the Giant Ocean Tank sits in a 150,000-US-gallon (570,000 L) tray of saltwater containing a habitat for penguins, including Africans and southern rockhoppers. The penguins live on several artificial rock islands in the exhibit and can be viewed from the spiral walkway, the areas around the perimeter of the tray, and every gallery.

=== Galleries ===
Four levels of smaller exhibits, open to the atrium and accessible via either the spiral or a separate series of ramps, surround the Giant Ocean Tank and penguin habitat.

- The Tropical Gallery features live corals and hundreds of warm-water fishes, including a floor-to-ceiling, 9,000-US-gallon (34,000 L) Indo-Pacific coral reef exhibit.
- The Temperate Gallery features goliath groupers, lungfish, weedy seadragons, and sea jellies.
- The Freshwater Gallery is divided between freshwater aquatic habitats in the Amazon, including red-bellied piranhas, poison dart frogs, green anacondas, and electric eels, and the Connecticut River Valley, including brook trout and Atlantic salmon.
- The Northern Waters Gallery contrasts marine habitats in New England, primarily the Stellwagen Bank National Marine Sanctuary, and the Olympic Coast National Marine Sanctuary in the Pacific Northwest. Species exhibited include shorebirds, colorful American lobsters, and giant Pacific octopuses.
- Additionally, the Yawkey Coral Reef Center at the top of the Giant Ocean Tank sheds light on smaller-scale habitats in Caribbean waters, including dwarf seahorses and garden eels.

=== Shark and Ray Touch Tank ===
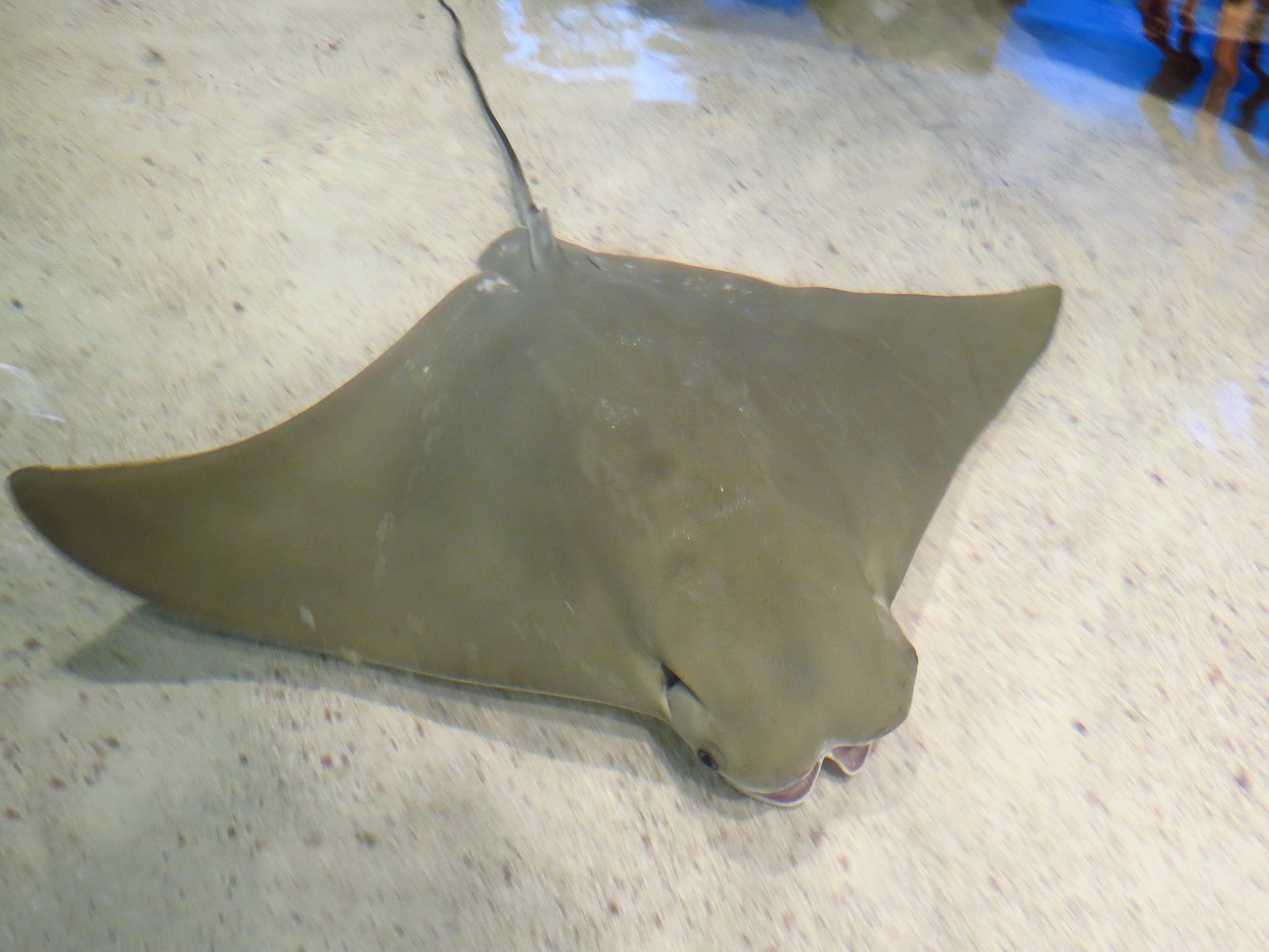
A cownose ray in the Shark and Ray Touch Tank

In 2011, the 25,000 US gallons (95,000 L) Trust Family Foundation Shark and Ray Touch Tank became a permanent exhibit in the aquarium's West Wing. Guests can interact with multiple species of stingray and shark, including leopard whiprays and brown-banded bamboo sharks, in a naturalistic mangrove habitat. The lower level of the West Wing houses the current special exhibit, the Science of Sharks, which explores shark anatomy, reproduction, and diversity.

== Themes ==
The aquarium has periodically featured temporary themed educational programming, often to highlight certain animals in the aquarium's collection.

=== Penguin Power ===
Shining a spotlight on the aquarium's penguins in 2010, Penguin Power was designed to show off the natural abilities of penguins. Guests learned how penguins survive in the wild and how to protect them.

=== Move It! Marine Mammals in Motion ===
Coinciding with the opening of the New Balance Foundation Marine Mammal Center in 2009, Marine Mammals In Motion highlighted the athleticism of the aquarium's harbor seals, sea lions, and fur seals and encouraged young guests to be physically active in their lives. The Marine Mammal Center continues to draw connections between marine mammals and humans and point out the challenges marine mammals face in our oceans today.

=== Turtles Uncovered ===
In this 2008 exhibit, visitors learned that turtles and tortoises have lived on Earth for about 300 million years, long before the dinosaurs were around, but that now some turtles are faced with the threat of extinction due to pollution, habitat loss, and global climate change.

=== Killer Instincts ===
This special program in 2007 helped visitors learn about the animals that we fear the most. The special program included an interactive passport program along with live animal presentations and a large-format, high definition shark video. Prehistoric marine reptiles appeared in 3D at the Simons IMAX Theatre in Sea Monsters: A Prehistoric Adventure. Featured animals included the sand tiger shark, anaconda, great barracuda, electric eel, lionfish, moray eel, giant Pacific octopus, and southern stingray.

== Conservation ==
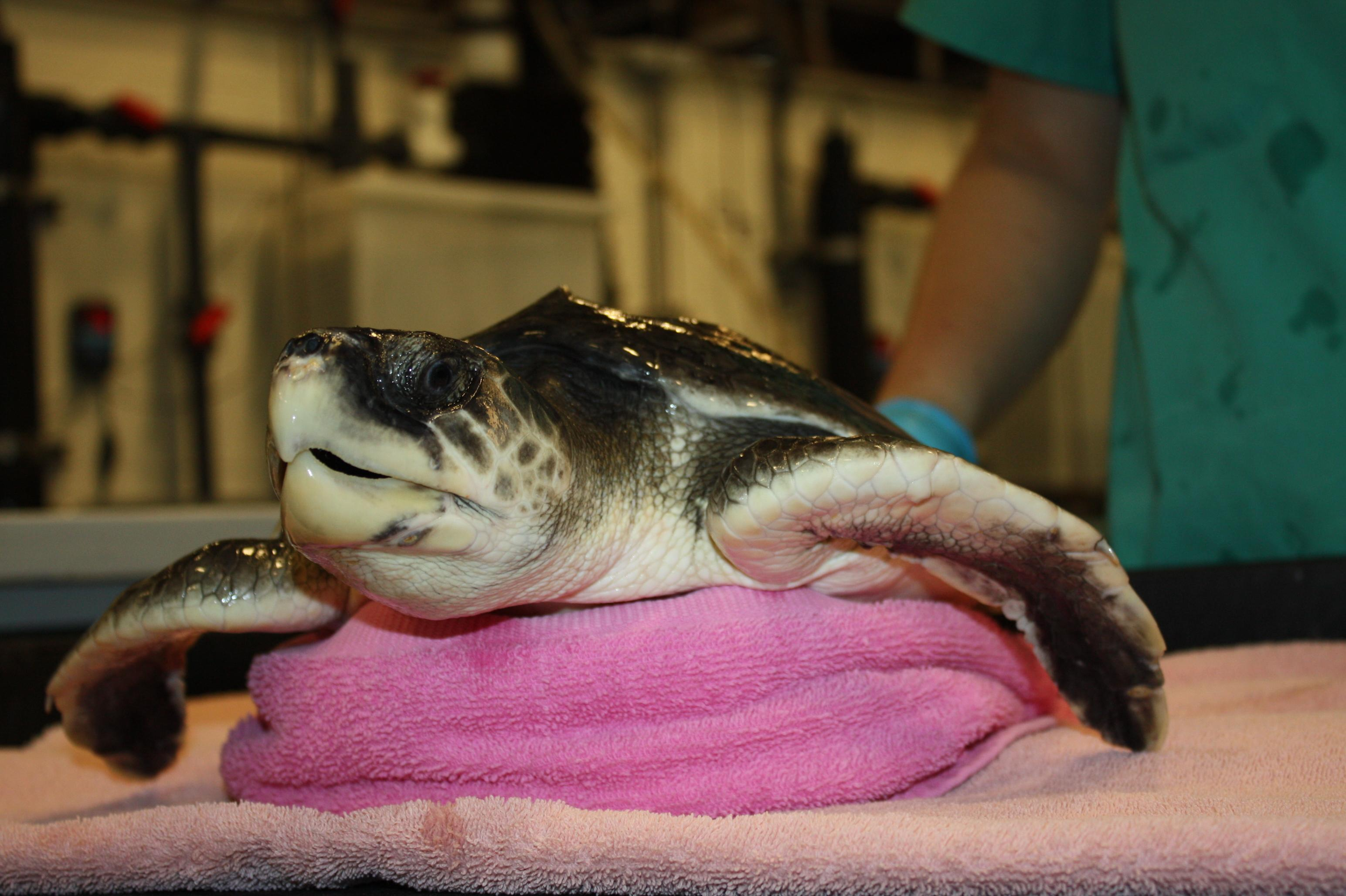
Aquarium veterinarians examine a Kemp's ridley sea turtle.

Historically, the aquarium has been active in marine mammal rescue on the New England coast. At one point, the rear of the main building was occupied by a marine animal hospital. The aquarium’s current harbor seals were born to individuals rescued from the wild early in its history, and its California sea lions and northern fur seal were deemed non-releasable after being rescued on the West Coast and Alaska. In 1999, the aquarium opened a new facility for rehabilitating harbor porpoises in Duxbury.

However, the passage of the Marine Mammal Protection Act of 1972 caused the previously imperiled populations of marine mammals like Atlantic harbor seals to rebound, leading the aquarium to transition away from marine mammal rescue in favor of research, advocacy, in particular for the critically endangered North Atlantic right whale, and the rescue, rehabilitation, and release of cold-stunned sea turtles stranded on Cape Cod.

As a member of the Association of Zoos and Aquariums (AZA), the aquarium participates in the Species Survival Plans for African and southern rockhopper penguins, the wild populations of which are threatened by habitat loss. The aquarium also aquacultures certain exhibit animals and its own live foods.

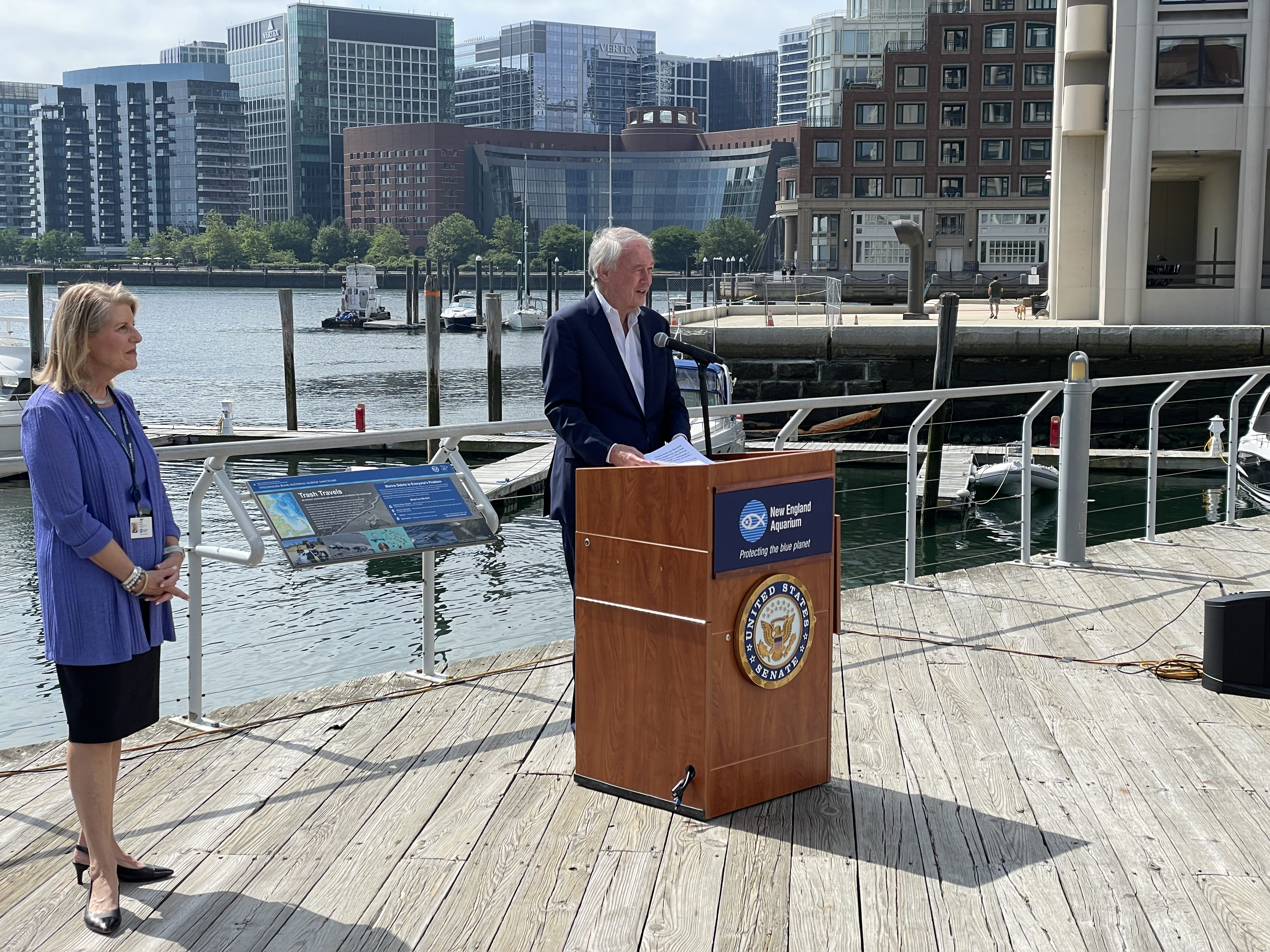
Massachusetts Senator Ed Markey with New England Aquarium President Vikki Spruill

The aquarium has advocated for action on climate change, sustainable fishing practices, and marine animal conservation at the city, state, and federal level. Aquarium scientists also work with some large seafood companies to improve their practices. The aquarium has publicly pushed for the development of alternatives to traditional American lobster fishing to protect North Atlantic right whales, which has been protested by Maine lobstermen, and provided research to guide offshore wind development, which has been criticized by some other right whale advocates due to its potential impact on the endangered animals.

In the 1970s and 80s, the aquarium and numerous other local organizations called for the cleanup of Boston Harbor and the Charles River to make it safe for fishing and swimming, which was ultimately successful.

== Whale watch ==
During the months of April–October, the aquarium partners with Boston Harbor Cruises to bring whale watchers 30 miles (48 km) east of Boston Harbor to the Stellwagen Bank Marine Sanctuary. Boats keep a responsible distance as on-board naturalists provide narration. Sightings of whales and many other marine animals are almost guaranteed, as the sanctuary is a rich feeding ground is for humpback whales, finback whales, minke whales, pilot whales, large pods of dolphins, and the endangered North Atlantic right whale. Most trips last around 3 to 4 hours. If no whales are sighted, guests receive a voucher for another cruise.

== Gallery ==
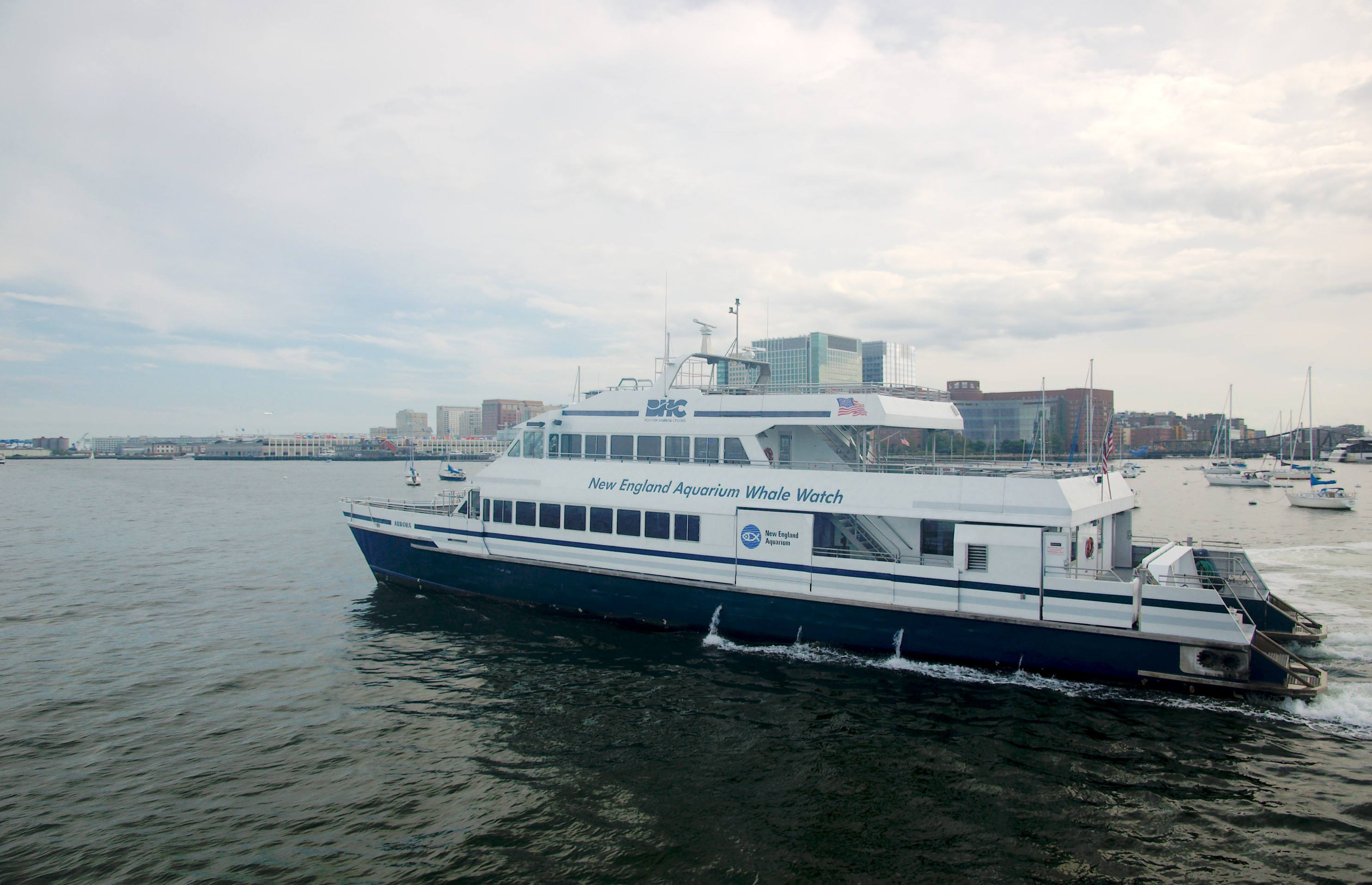
The Aurora, a New England Aquarium Whale Watch boat

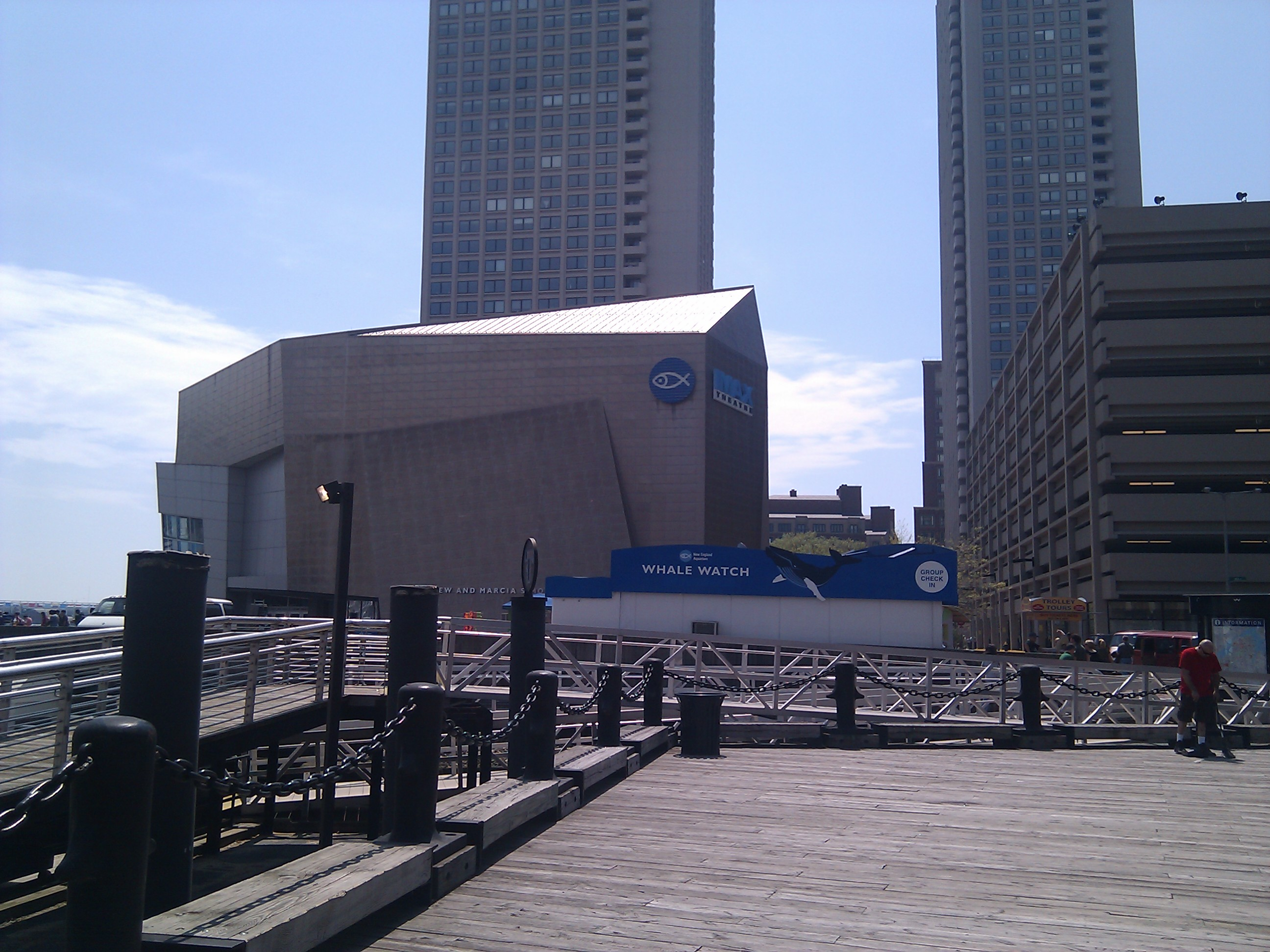
IMAX theatre at the aquarium

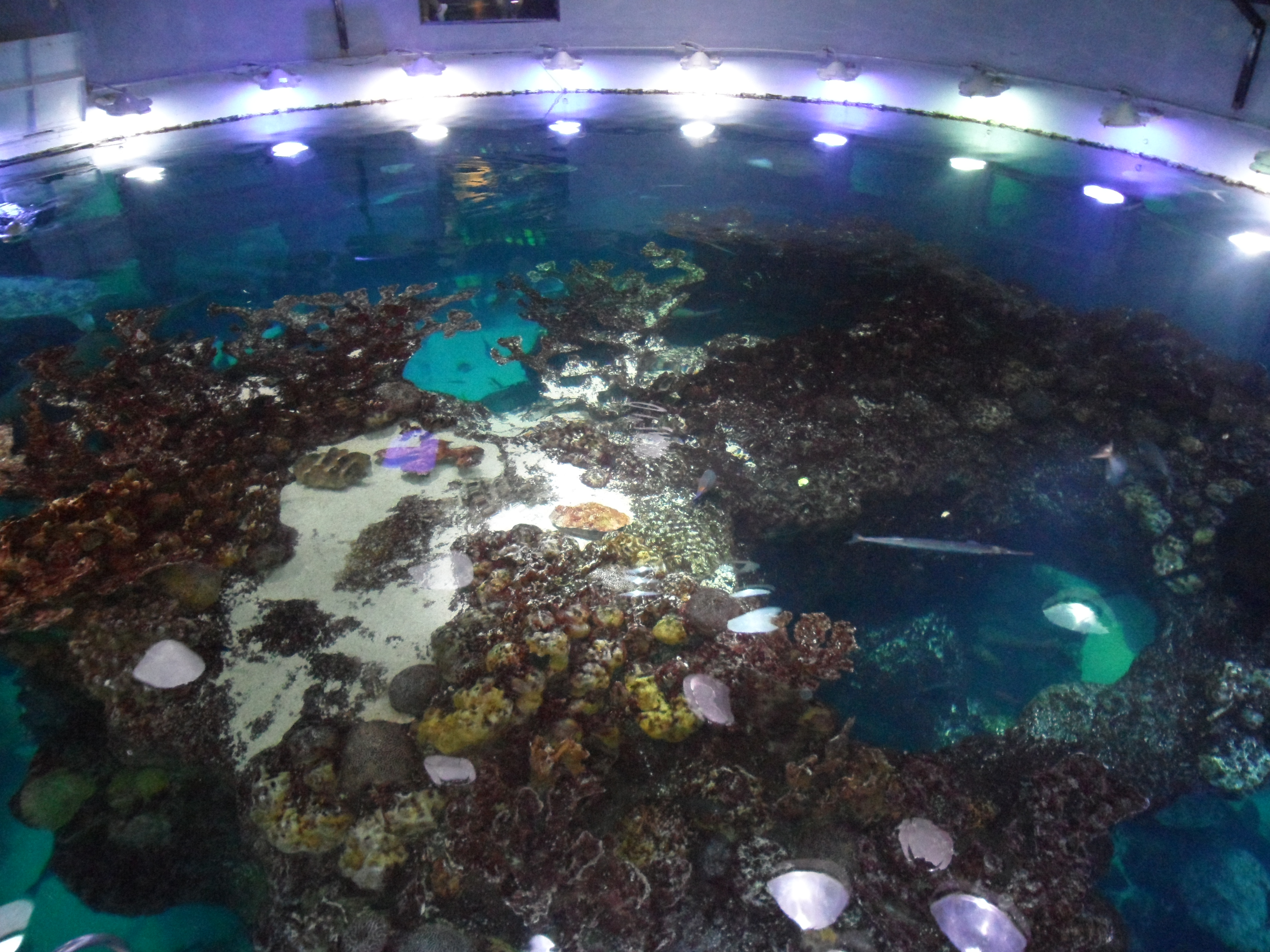
Top of the Coral Reef tank

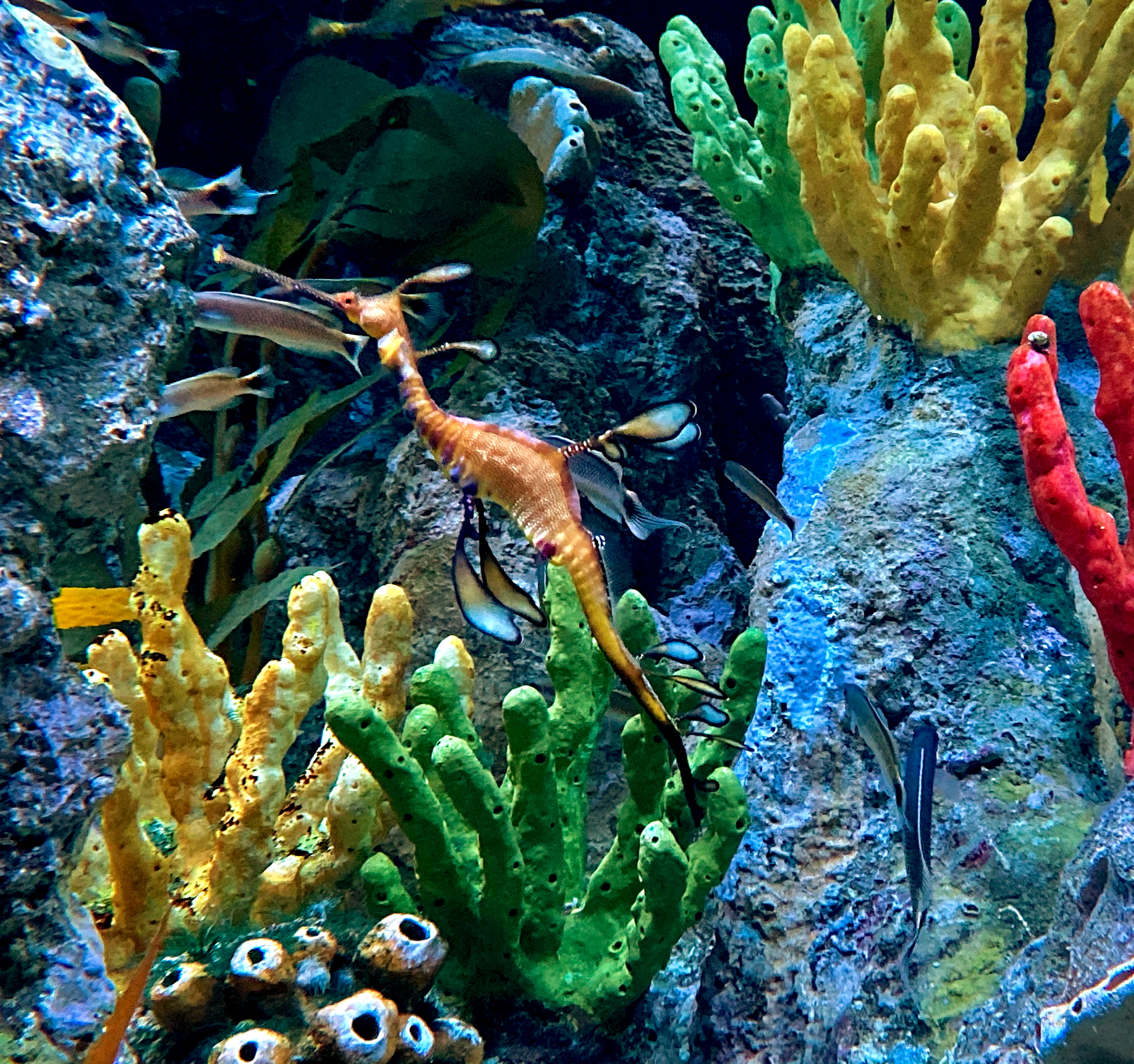
A weedy sea dragon in the Temperate Gallery

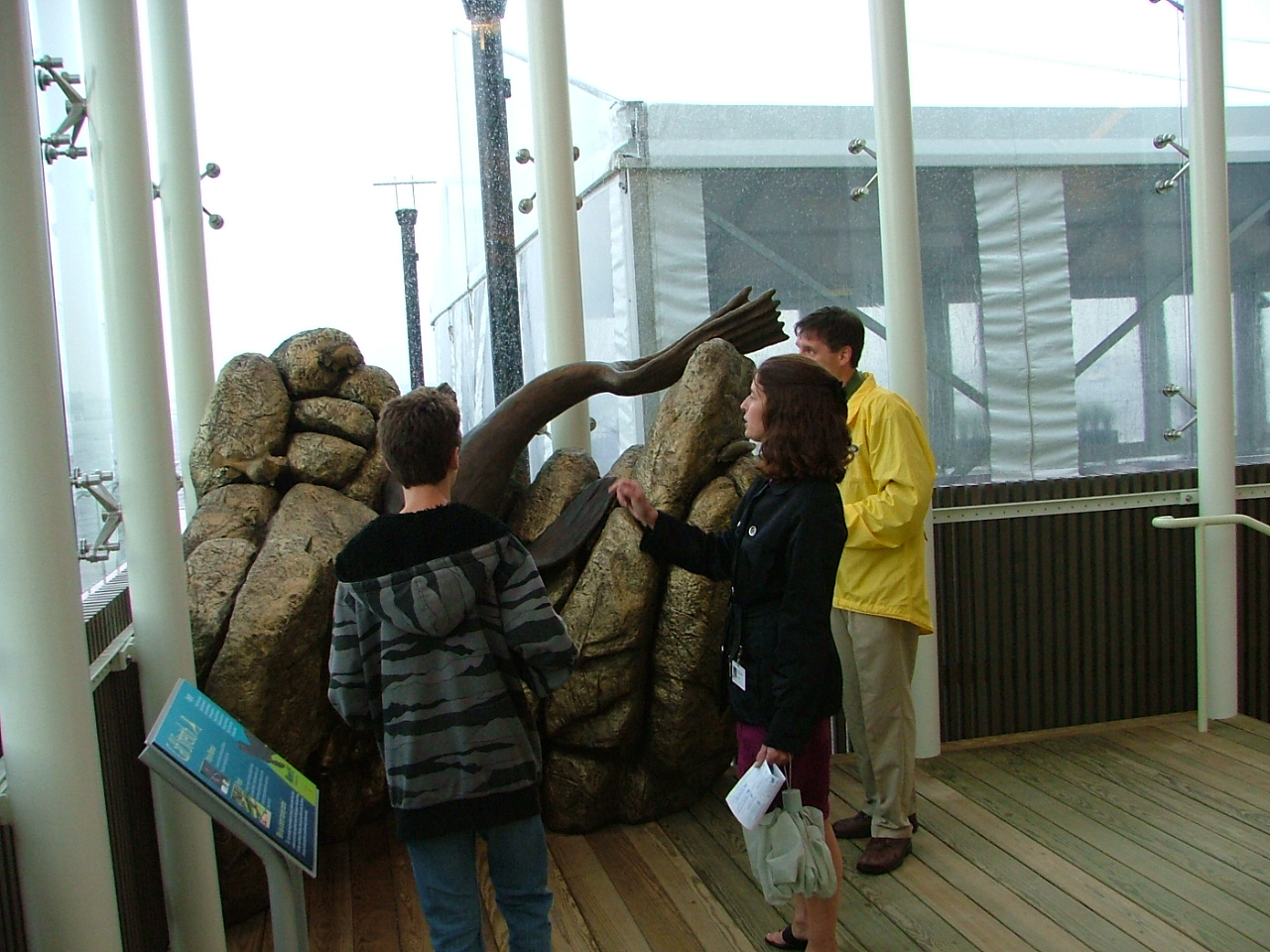
Artwork at the aquarium

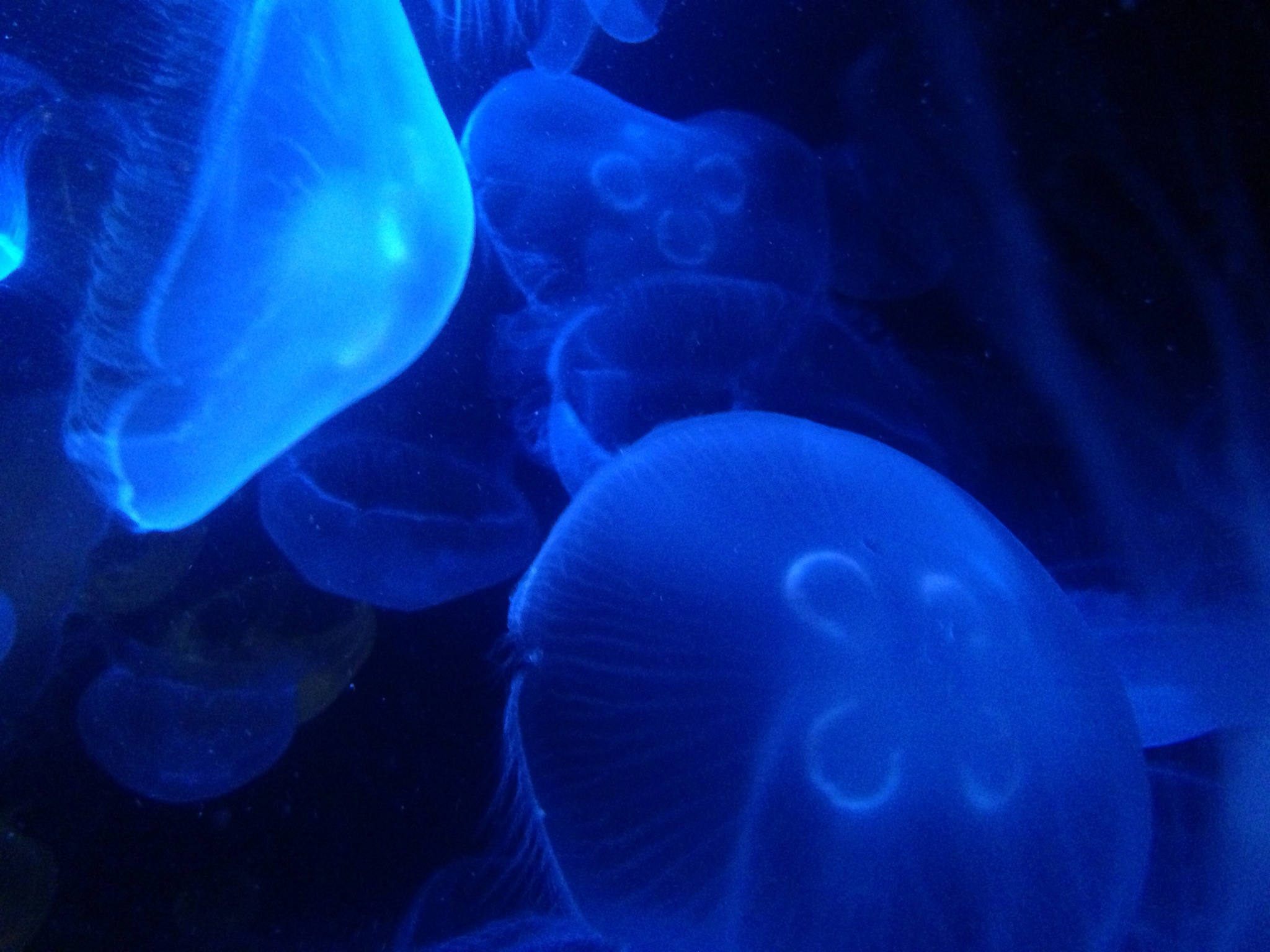
Sea jellies on display

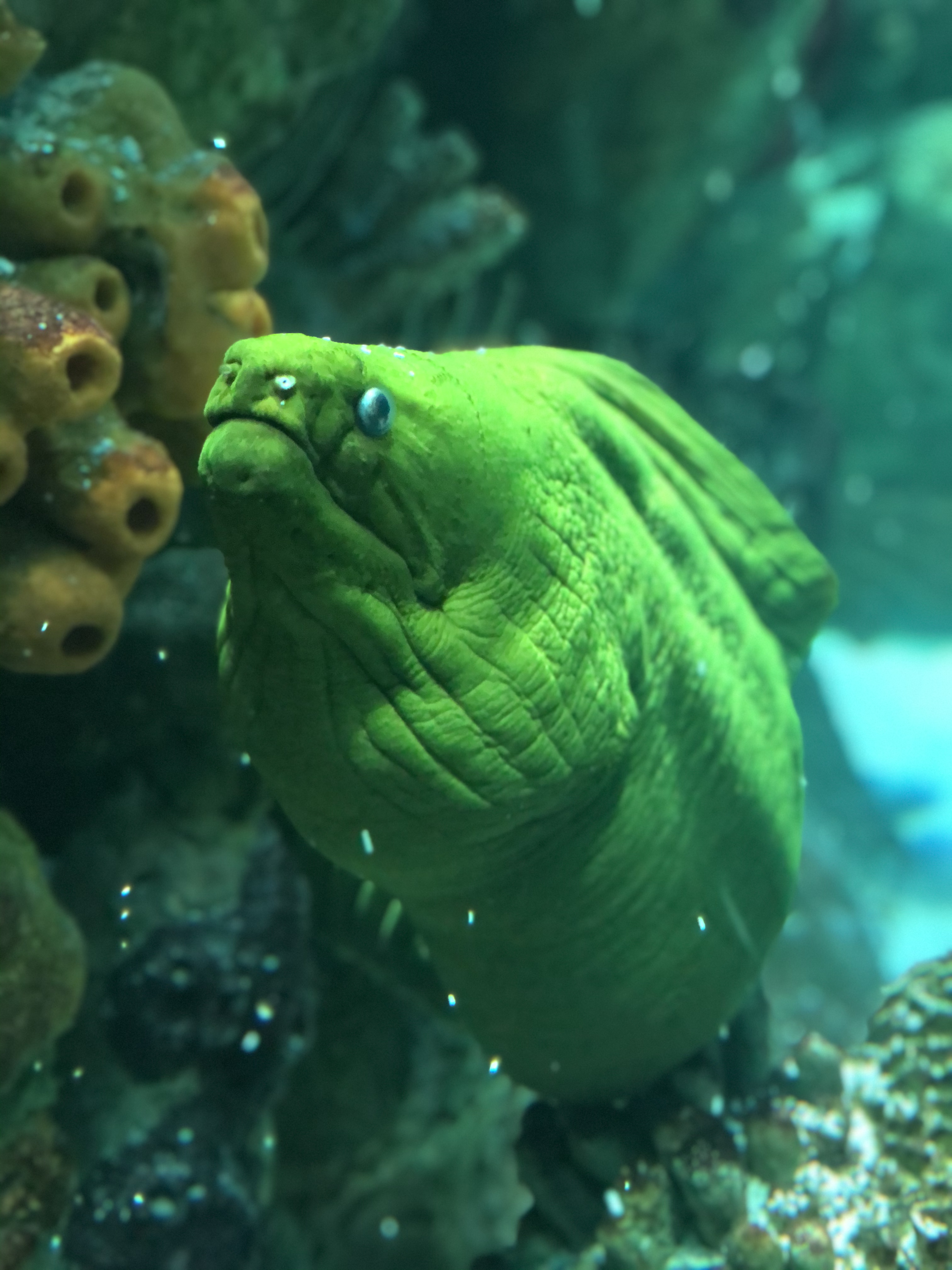
Moray eel at the aquarium

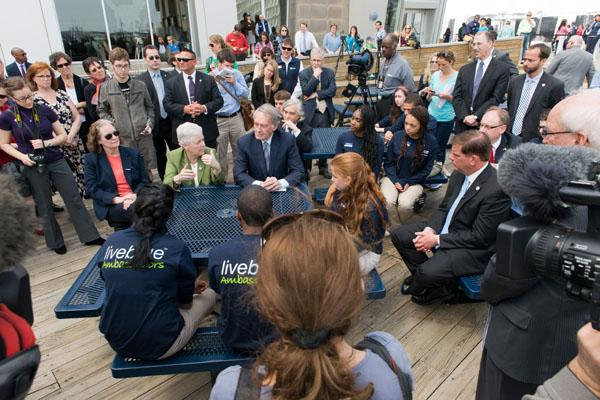
Earth Day community event on climate change

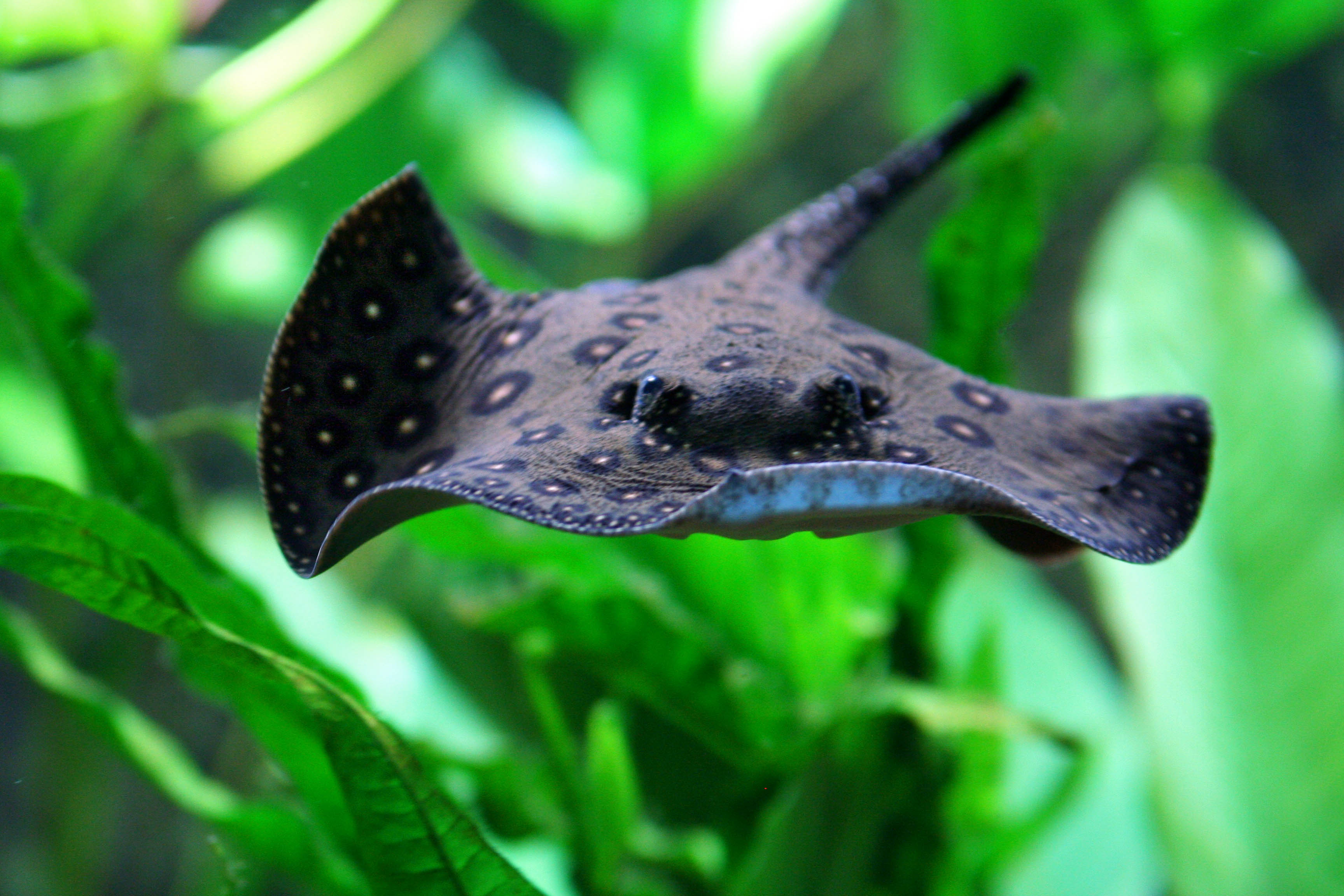
Ocellate river stingray (Potamotrygon motoro)

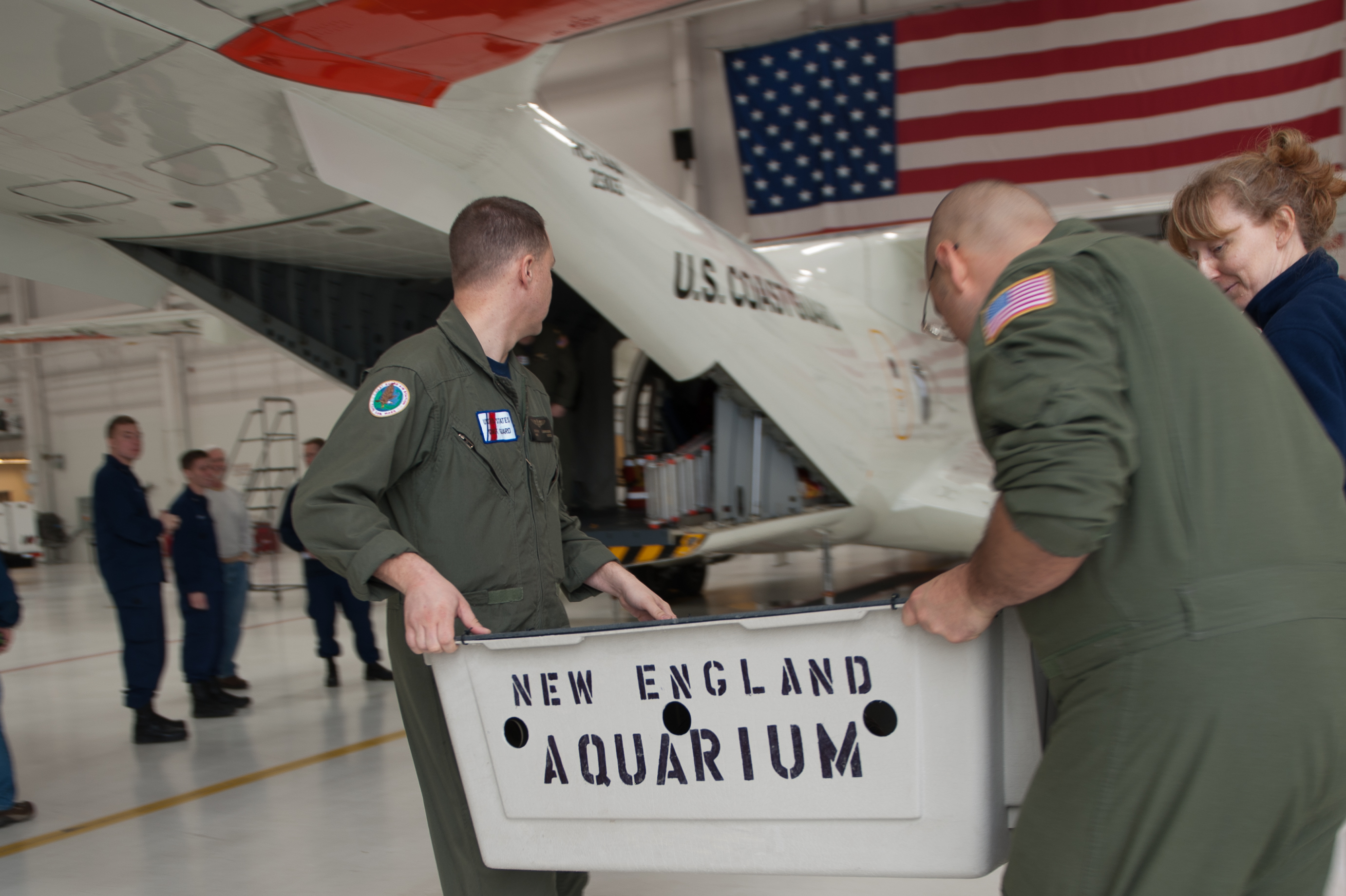
The aquarium working with the United States Coast Guard to transport endangered sea turtles

== Cancelled expansions ==
In 1988, the aquarium announced its plans to sell the Central Wharf property and build a larger facility across the Charles River at the Charlestown Navy Yard. The project would have cost an estimated $150 million and encompassed 278,300 square feet (25,850 m^{2}) of land. Flooding Drydock 5 at the Navy Yard would create an exhibit of unprecedented size for dolphins and pilot whales, with underwater viewing tunnels as deep as 19 feet (5.8 m) below ground level. The project leaders predicted that the new aquarium would attract 2 million visitors annually. However, the move was cancelled in 1991 when neighbors of the proposed site objected to its construction, and when the aquarium could not sell its Central Wharf location for a sufficiently high price.

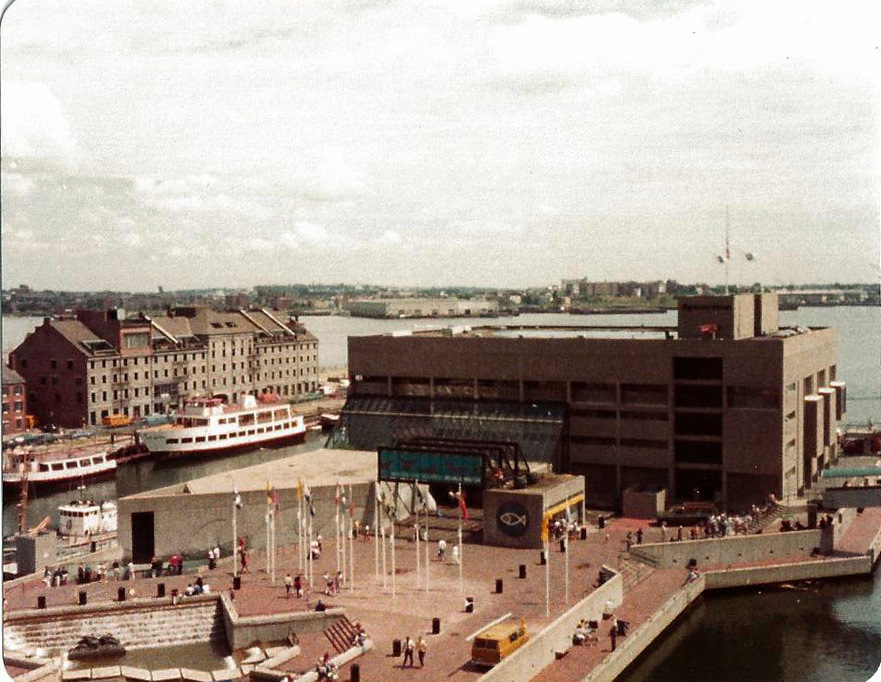
The aquarium in 1985, 13 years before the addition of the West Wing

When the Charlestown Aquarium was cancelled, the Board of Trustees proposed to instead expand the current aquarium on both sides in 1992 to create a West Wing and an East Wing. The East Wing would have been a 79,000–90,000 sq ft (7,300–8,400 m^{2}) addition costing $43 million, and would have included a 1.1-million-US-gallon (4,200,000 L) Gulf Stream exhibit. It also promised a 20-foot (6.1 m) x 30-foot (9.1 m) window into a new 550,000-US-gallon (2,100,000 L) Gulf of Maine exhibit.

The project was to be completed by 2004, but the East Wing was cancelled due to the September 11th attacks making the public wary of crowded places, the closure of the Aquarium MBTA station due to the Big Dig, and the rising cost of the project: as high as $125 million. In order to pay back the funds they had raised, the aquarium took on $1.4 million in debt and shortly thereafter made sweeping budget and staff cuts, causing the aquarium to lose its AZA accreditation in 2003. However, the aquarium earned full accreditation once again in 2006.

== In popular culture ==
- In 1981, director Sidney Poitier shot scenes at the aquarium for the comedy film Traces.
- In an episode from the fourth season of Fetch! with Ruff Ruffman, entitled "How to Break the Ice and Also Waddle on It", Ruff sends Isaac Bean to learn about penguins and volunteer in the penguin exhibit.
  - In an earlier episode "Don't Put the Kart Before the Sea Lion", Ruff sends Taylor Garron to train the aquarium's sea lions.
- A scene in the 2012 comedy film Ted starring Mark Wahlberg and Seth MacFarlane prominently features the Giant Ocean Tank. The tank that John and Ted sit in front of, however, is computer generated.
- The 2018 superhero film Aquaman features a scene set in the "Boston Aquarium", a fictionalized version of the New England Aquarium filmed primarily at the Georgia Aquarium in Atlanta and augmented with computer-generated imagery.
- A 2021 episode of Wildlife Nation with Jeff Corwin on ABC featured the aquarium and its sea turtle rescue program.

== See also ==
- Hoover, a harbor seal at the aquarium who learned to imitate human speech
- Andre, a harbor seal who lived at the aquarium but swam back to Rockport, Maine every summer
- Brian Skerry, the aquarium’s Explorer-in-Residence
- Sy Montgomery, author of The Soul of an Octopus
- Sylvia Earle
- Dolphins of the Sea
- Echo of the Waves
- Franklin Park Zoo
- Stone Zoo
