= Susumu Shingu =

Japanese sculptor (born 1937)

Susumu Shingū
- Born: 13 July 1937 (age 89); Osaka, Japan
- Known for: Sculpture
- Notable work: Gift of the Wind
- Movement: Kinetic art, abstract art

Susumu Shingū (新宮 晋, Shingū Susumu) (born 13 July 1937) is a kinetic sculptor from Japan. His nature-inspired works are constructed of highly engineered materials, commonly steel and Teflon.

== Early life and education ==
=== Early years ===
Shingū was born in Osaka, Japan, in 1937. He matriculated at the Tokyo University of the Arts in 1956, with a concentration in oil painting. A bursary from the Italian government followed, allowing him to travel to Italy where his intention was to study figurative painting. He attended the Accademia di Belle Arti di Roma from 1960 to 1962, while also working as a tour guide for Japanese tourists. By his own account, Shingū's interest in sculpture developed as his interest in abstraction was expanding. He hung a painting outside to record it photographically: the wind interfered. He became fascinated by the potential for three-dimensional movement. "The work that followed relied on natural forces to make it move or make sound, and he began using more sophisticated materials for outdoor works," as traditional art materials were either too heavy to supply graceful natural movement or too quickly degraded under outdoor conditions.

He was quoted as saying "My works are ways of translating the messages of nature into visible movements".

== Career ==
=== Wind sculpture ===
While he was still in Italy, a chance meeting with Kageki Minami, the president of Osaka Shipbuilding Company, led to Shingū's return to Japan, where Minami allowed him a studio in his shipyard and access to the talents of company engineers. With this support, Shingū produced Path of the Wind, a 20-meter-tall sculpture that was his first large-scale commissioned piece. It was installed in Senrikita Park in 1977. He began to produce work incorporating elements from his study of the Japanese folk arts: wind chimes and traditional carp banners.

Expo '70, a World's Fair in Tokyo, was a major event on the arts scene in Japan. Shingū was one of eight Japanese sculptors chosen to represent the nation. The organizers commissioned a large piece from Shingu for the central plaza.

From 1971 to 1972, he spent a year at Harvard University as a Visiting Artist at Harvard's Carpenter Center for the Visual and Environmental Studies. In 1983, he built Gift of the Wind, a permanent wind installation outside the Porter subway station in Cambridge, as part of the city's Arts on the Line program.

=== Sanda ===
In 2012, a 3,000-sq.-meter open-air sculpture garden was established in Sanda, Japan, named the Susumu Shingū Wind Museum. Starting in 2019, he began designing and architecting a utopian village next to the museum, named Atelier Earth. This would become his largest work.

=== Other work ===
He has also collaborated in theatre projects (including Noh performances) and published over twenty books.

== Works ==
=== Exhibitions and traveling shows ===
Shingū's works have been exhibited internationally, and have won awards including the Outdoor Sculpture Prize of Nagano and the Japan Grand Prix of Art. Two widely travelled exhibits were Windcircus (1987), shown in Bremen; Barcelona; Florence; Lahti, Finland; New York City; Boston; Chicago; Los Angeles; and Nagano, and Wind Caravan (2019–20) in Japan and New Zealand. In June 2025, another solo exhibition, Susumu Shingu: Elated!, opened at the Japan Society in New York City.

=== Gallery ===
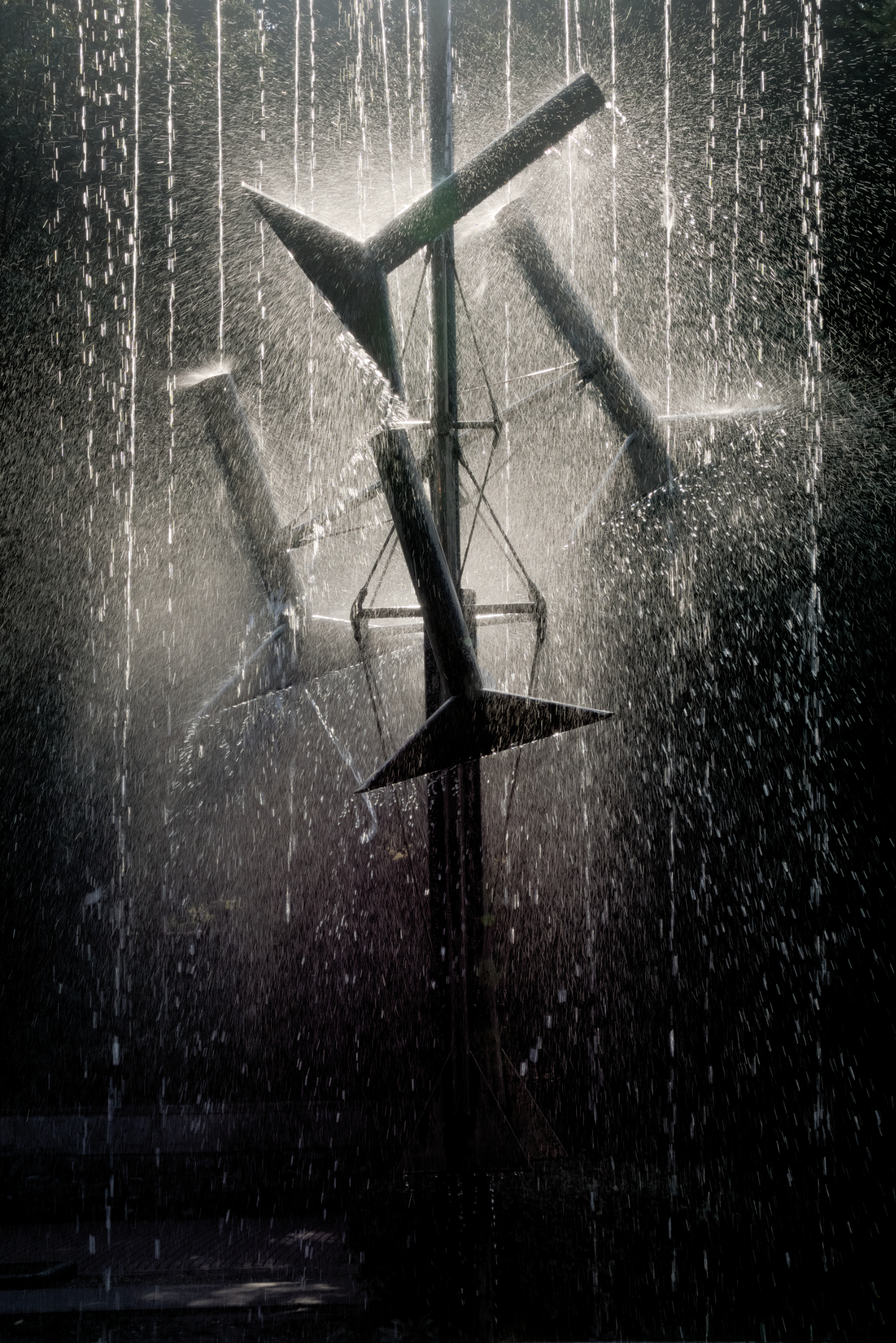
Fontana Duetto d’Acqua, Montecatini Terme, Italy

== Publications ==
Shingu has published or contributed to edited works of his art in over ten volumes, including Wind and Water, Windcircus, Dialogue with Nature, and Wind Caravan, and a biographic trilogy, Inside My Thinking. He has also published a range of children's books which have been translated into multiple languages, including Strawberries, Traveling Butterfly, and With the Sun.
