= Harbor station (MBTA) =

Former railway station in Gloucester, Massachusetts

Harbor
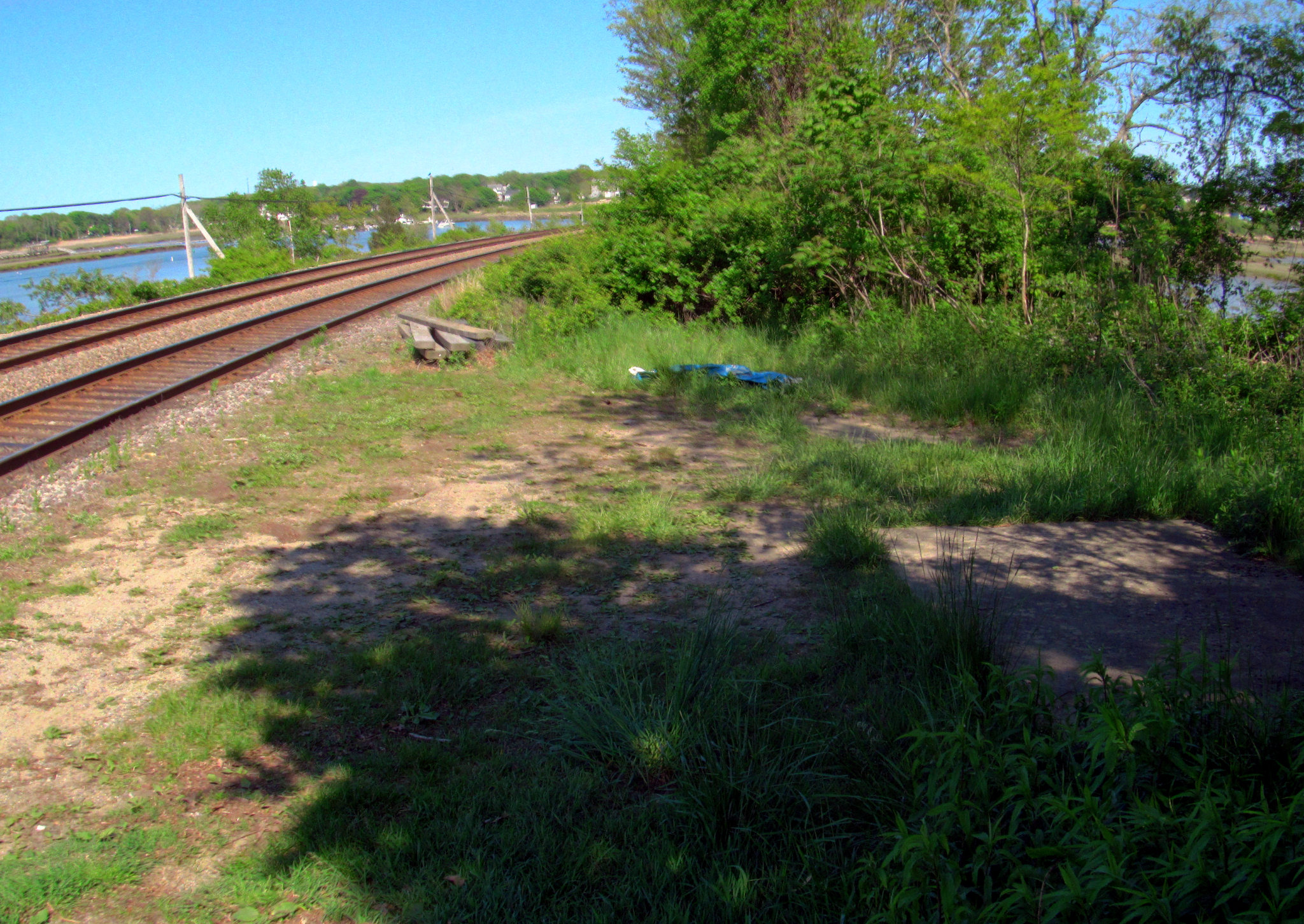
- Remains of Harbor station in May 2012

General information
- Location: The Heights at Cape Ann; Gloucester, Massachusetts
- Coordinates: 42°37′04″N 70°41′12″W
- Owner: MBTA
- Line: Gloucester Branch
- Platforms: 1 side platform
- Tracks: 2

Other information
- Fare zone: 7

History
- Opened: December 1977
- Closed: January 7, 1985

Passengers
- 1983: 35 (weekday inbound average)

Services
Preceding station	MBTA	Following station
West Gloucester toward North Station	Newburyport/Rockport Line	Gloucester toward Rockport
Location

Harbor was an MBTA Commuter Rail station in Gloucester, Massachusetts. It served the Rockport Branch of the Newburyport/Rockport Line. A short-lived stop, it was open from 1977 to 1985.

== History ==
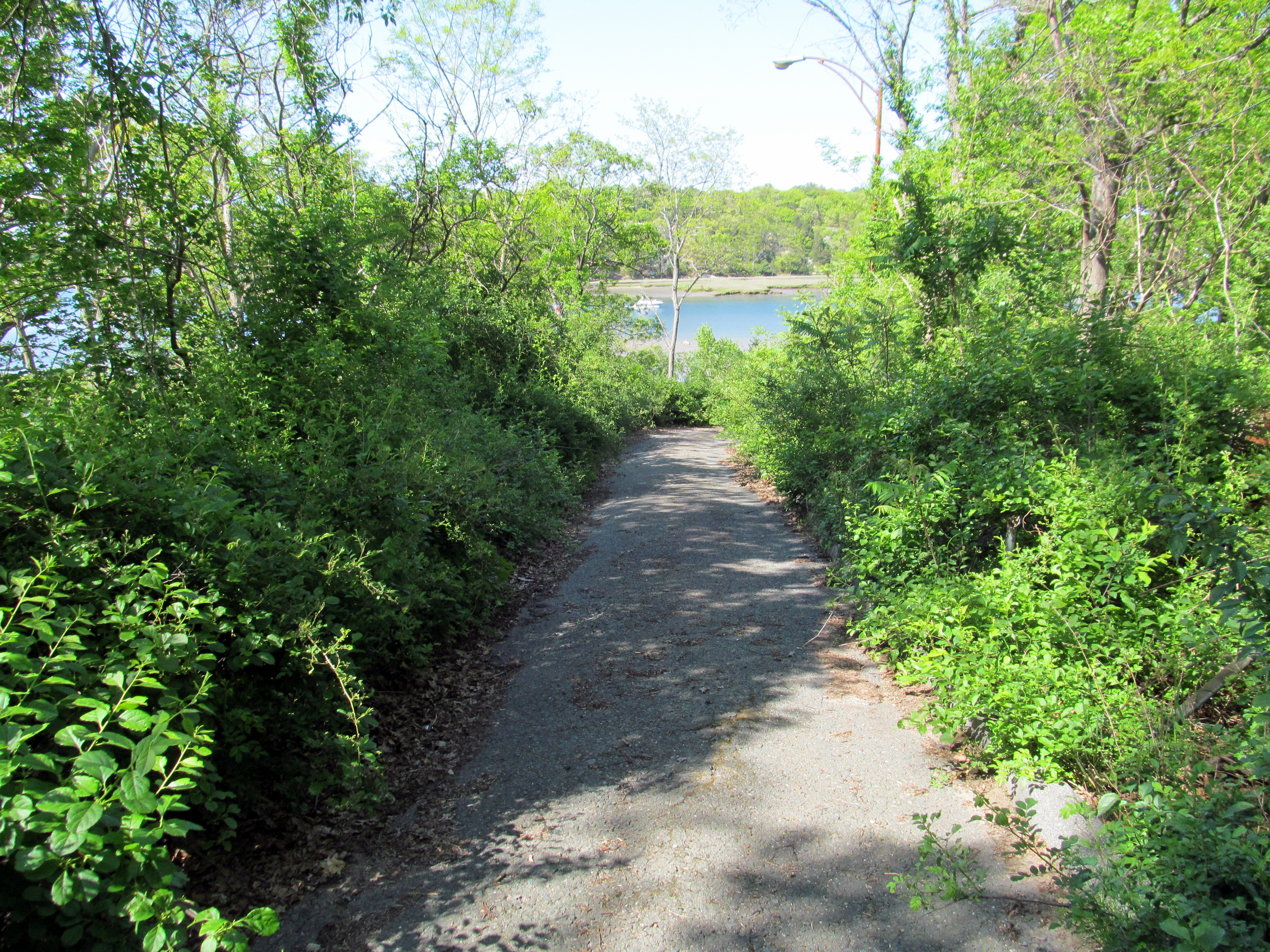
The path from the apartment complex to the station photographed in May 2012

Harbor station opened in December 1977 to serve a new apartment complex (now The Heights at Cape Ann) located on a bluff above the tracks. Several short turn trains (which had formerly terminated at Manchester but ran to an interlocking just west of Gloucester to switch tracks for the inbound journey) were extended to Harbor at that time. Several trips, including the short turns, were cut in September 1979. On January 30, 1981, service to nearby West Gloucester was discontinued during a round of budget cuts, leaving Harbor as the only station serving the area.

The station was never heavily used - an April 1983 count showed just 35 daily boardings. On November 16, 1984, a fire destroyed Beverly Draw, which connects Salem and Beverly Depot on the line. A shuttle train continued to operate from Rockport to Beverly until January 7, 1985, when it was replaced by bus service. The locomotives used were then trucked to Danvers so they could be repaired at the MBTA's main maintenance facility. When service was restored on December 1, 1985, Harbor station remained closed. West Gloucester, which had more room for parking, reopened instead.

Harbor station consisted of a small shelter with no platforms; passengers boarded from a clearing next to the tracks. A paved path led from the rear of the apartment complex to the station area. Only the path and a small clearing around the concrete base of the shelter are still extant.
