= South Salem station =

Rail station in Massachusetts, United States

South Salem

General information
- Location: Ocean Avenue; Salem, Massachusetts
- Coordinates: 42.50762°N 70.89806°W
- Line: Eastern Route
- Platforms: 2 side platforms
- Tracks: 2

Construction
- Accessible: Yes

Other information
- Status: Proposed

Proposed services
Preceding station	MBTA	Following station
Swampscott toward North Station	Newburyport/Rockport Line	Salem toward Newburyport or Rockport
Location

South Salem station is a proposed MBTA Commuter Rail station in Salem, Massachusetts, which would be served by the Newburyport/Rockport Line.

== Planning ==
In February 2001, the MBTA began two parallel planning processes for the North Shore region: a Draft Environment Impact Statement for the Blue Line Extension (DEIS), and a Major Investment Study (MIS) for other projects primarily north of Salem. The MIS, released in 2004, identified a number of possible improvements to the Newburyport/Rockport Line, including upgrades to current stations, grade crossing eliminations, signal system improvements, increased frequencies, a second Salem tunnel, a branch line to Danvers, and new stations at Revere and South Salem. A South Salem station would serve Salem State University, the North Shore Medical Center, and residential areas south of downtown Salem — some of which were served by the pre-1987 station, but only by the 455 and 459 buses thereafter. The station was estimated to cost $12.2 to $13.8 million, with a single island platform serving the line's two tracks, and would draw about 600 daily riders. Two possible locations were considered: one with access from Laurel Street and the platform running to the north, and one with access from Ocean Avenue and the platform running to the south.

None of the projects in the DEIS or MIS was actually built due to lack of funding, except for parking structures at Salem and Beverly which were mandated as Big Dig mitigation. A feasibility study, released in March 2016, analyzed four possible station locations, including three sites near the MIS locations plus one at Jefferson Avenue to the south. The station would have two side platforms and cost between $15 million and $20 million depending on the site. The study received mixed reactions from Salem residents, including concerns about construction, lights, and trains idling near a residential area but also hope for improved transit accessibility and higher property values. By November 2016, a site off Canal Street near Lauren Street was considered the preferred alternative. Part or all of an adjacent industrial property could be purchased to provide pedestrian access and possibly a small parking lot on the west side of the tracks, improving access to the nearby North Shore Medical Center.

As of June 2024, the city is designing the Ocean Avenue West alternative, with side platforms rather than an island platform. Conceptual design is expected to be complete in November 2024. A layover yard slightly to the north, on the site of a former freight yard, is also proposed. In June 2024, the city received a $2-million federal grant to complete design of the station. In July 2026, the MBTA issued a request for qualifications for design of the station. The solicitation notes tentative plans for either two 600 feet (180 m) long high-level side platforms or a center platform, as well as elevators and a 900 feet (270 m) elevated and enclosed community path.
