= West Gloucester station =

Commuter rail station in Gloucester, Massachusetts

West Gloucester
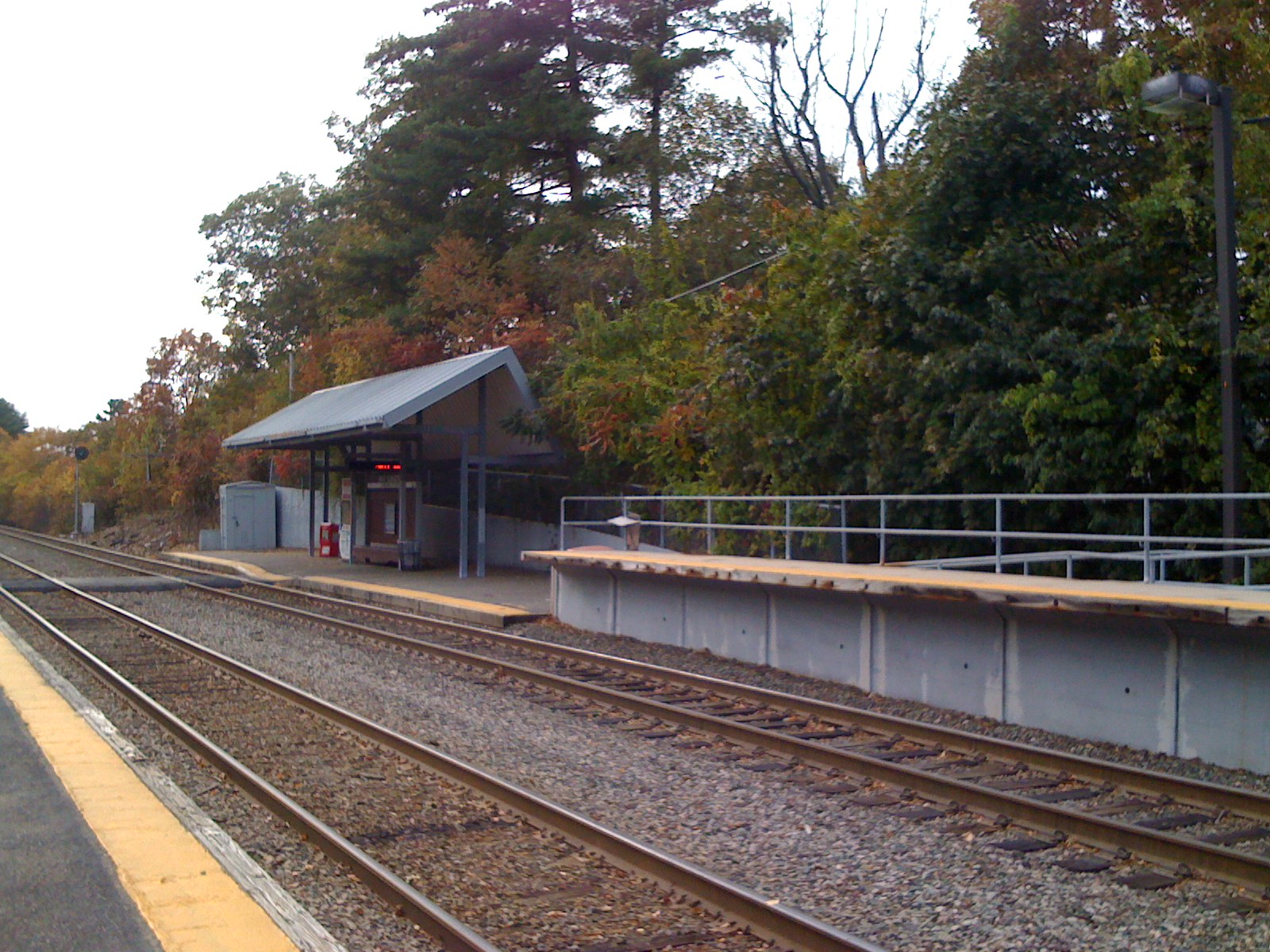
- West Gloucester station in 2008

General information
- Location: 290 Essex Avenue (Route 133); Gloucester, Massachusetts
- Coordinates: 42.61195°N 70.70550°W
- Line: Gloucester Branch
- Platforms: 2 side platforms
- Tracks: 2
- Connections: CATA: 5

Construction
- Parking: 43 spaces
- Cycle facilities: Yes
- Accessible: Yes

Other information
- Fare zone: 7

Passengers
- 2024: 38 daily boardings

Services
Preceding station	MBTA	Following station
Manchester toward North Station	Newburyport/Rockport Line	Gloucester toward Rockport
Location

West Gloucester station is an MBTA Commuter Rail station on the Newburyport/Rockport Line, located off Massachusetts Route 133 (Essex Road) in the west part of Gloucester, Massachusetts.

== History ==
When the Gloucester Branch Railroad opened in 1847, there were no stops except Manchester and Gloucester. A number of infill stations were later added; West Gloucester station was open by 1872, and by 1884 had a small depot building on the south side of the track. That building was gone by 1977.

West Gloucester station was closed on January 30, 1981, during severe budget cuts; 1977-opened Harbor station 1.1 miles (1.8 km) east remained open. The line was temporarily closed on January 7, 1985, after a November 1984 fire destroyed the drawbridge between Salem and Beverly. When the line reopened on December 1, 1985, West Gloucester was reopened but Harbor remained closed.

On April 29, 2020, service between West Gloucester and Rockport was indefinitely replaced by buses due to a failure of the old Gloucester Drawbridge. That June, the MBTA indicated the closure would continue until the completion of the bridge replacement. Regular service to Rockport over the bridge resumed on May 23, 2022.
