= Newburyport/Rockport Line =

Commuter rail service in Massachusetts, US

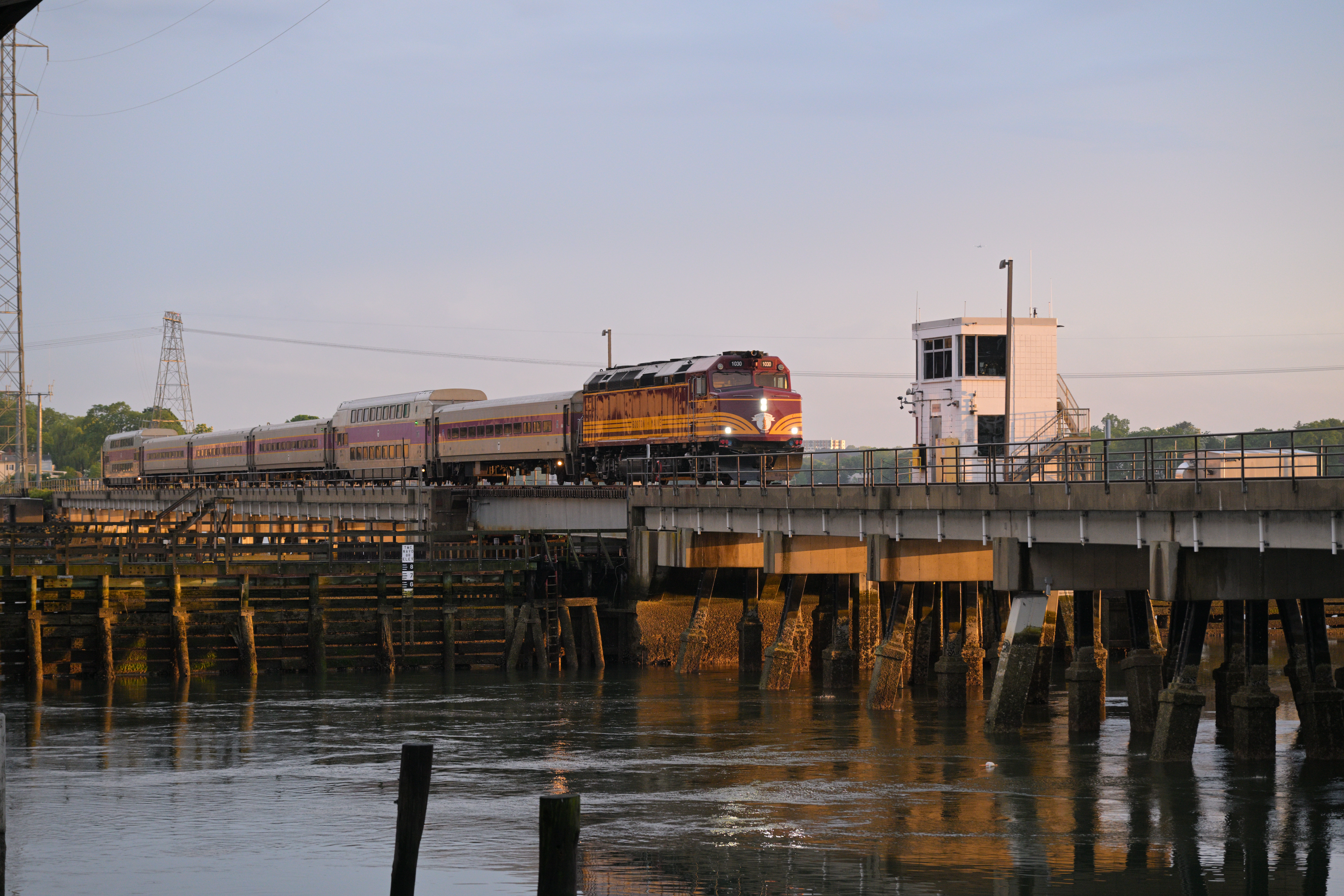
- An outbound train in Beverly in 2026

Overview
- Owner: Massachusetts Bay Transportation Authority
- Locale: Greater Boston
- Termini: North Station; Newburyport or Rockport
- Stations: 12 (Newburyport–Boston); 14 (Rockport–Boston) (7 serve both routes)

Service
- Type: Commuter Rail
- System: MBTA Commuter Rail
- Services: 2
- Train number(s): 1001-1055, 1102-1157, 1211-1258 (weekdays); 1501-1536, 1602-1635 (weekends)
- Operator: Keolis North America
- Daily ridership: 10,392 (2024)

Technical
- Line length: 36.2 miles (58.3 km) (Newburyport–Boston); 35.3 miles (56.8 km) (Rockport–Boston)
- Track gauge: 4 ft 8 1/2 in (1,435 mm)

The Newburyport/Rockport Line is a branch of the MBTA Commuter Rail system, running northeast from downtown Boston, Massachusetts towards Cape Ann and the Merrimack Valley, serving the North Shore. The first leg, operating via the Eastern Route of the former Boston and Maine Railroad, serves Chelsea, Lynn, Swampscott, Salem, and Beverly. From there, a northern branch continues via the Eastern Route to serve Hamilton, Ipswich, Rowley, and Newburyport, while other trains operate east from Beverly via the Gloucester Branch, serving Manchester, Gloucester, and Rockport. A bicycle coach is offered on the Rockport branch during the summer.

== History ==
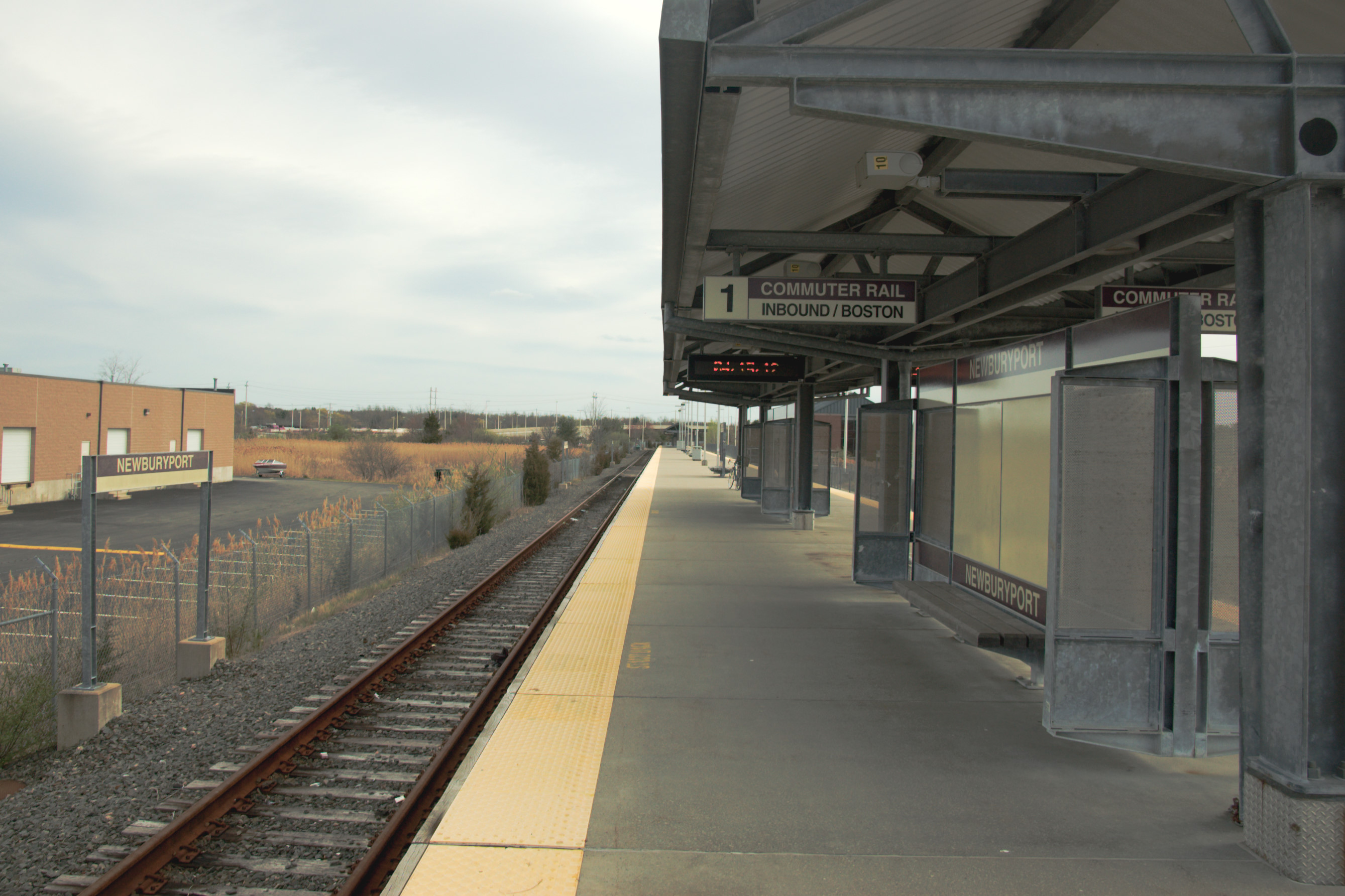
After 22 years terminating at Ipswich, the line was restored to Newburyport in 1998

The Eastern Route main line between Boston and Portsmouth, New Hampshire opened in 1836 as the Eastern Railroad. Ferries were used to transport passengers between the East Boston terminal and Boston proper. The line was extended to Portland, Maine, in 1842 under a track-sharing agreement with the Boston and Maine Railroad. The Gloucester Branch was constructed in 1847, but despite local support, it was not extended to Rockport until November 1861. In 1854, with the opening of the Grand Junction Railroad, the Eastern Railroad acquired direct access to downtown Boston.

The Boston & Maine leased the Eastern Railroad in 1884, and in 1893 the new North Union Station became the terminus of the B&M, its subsidiaries the Eastern Railroad and Boston & Lowell Railroad, and the Fitchburg Railroad.

Amesbury Branch service ended in 1936, and Essex Branch service in 1942. Branch line service declined heavily in the 1950s, with the single Salem–Marblehead round trip gone by 1957. Massive service cuts on May 18, 1958, ended all Saugus and Danvers branch service, closed all stations south of Lynn, and halved Marblehead service. Further cuts on June 14, 1959, ended Marblehead Branch service; stations at East Lynn, Salisbury, and West Manchester were also closed.

On February 28, 1956, a southbound Danvers–Boston commuter train crashed into the rear of a stopped Portsmouth–Boston local train just north of Swampscott station during a snowstorm. The collision, blamed on the engineer operating at unsafe speeds for the conditions, killed 13 people and injured 283. A second collision in Revere later that morning injured 143 people — some of whom had already been in the Swampscott wreck. On December 27, 1966, an outbound Budd RDC struck an oil tanker truck at Second Street in Everett, killing 13 people.

=== MBTA era ===
In the 1960s, the B&M's passenger services - which, by that time, were almost exclusively commuter services — began to become financially unviable until the MBTA subsidized, and then acquired, the services. The line beyond Newburyport was abandoned in 1982; however, commuter service had been cut back from Newburyport to Ipswich in 1976. In 1998, service was restored to Newburyport at a cost of $46 million.

In the late 1980s, the MBTA planned to construct a park and ride relief station off Route 107 in Saugus. A $400,000 planning study was funded in February 1988; the proposed $11-million station would have had 1,000 parking spaces and opened in late 1991. The station was not built; instead, a high-level platform and parking garage opened at Lynn in January 1992.

In February 2001, the MBTA began two parallel planning processes for the North Shore region: a Draft Environment Impact Statement for the Blue Line Extension (DEIS), and a Major Investment Study (MIS) for other projects primarily north of Salem. The MIS, released in 2004, identified a number of possible improvements to the Newburyport/Rockport Line, including upgrades to current stations, grade crossing eliminations, signal system improvements, increased frequencies, a second Salem tunnel, a branch line to Danvers, and new stations at Revere and South Salem. None of the projects in the DEIS or MIS was actually built due to lack of funding, except for parking structures at Salem and Beverly which were mandated as Big Dig mitigation. As of 2024, design of South Salem station is being undertaken by the city. The MBTA issued a solicitation for consultant design services for a station in July 2026.

In July 2019, Wynn Resorts proposed a combination commuter rail and Silver Line station in Everett to serve the newly owned Encore Boston Harbor casino and proposed surrounding development. In January 2026, the city reached an agreement with Wynn for the development of two new hotels under which Wynn will pay up to $25 million for design and construction of the commuter rail station.

=== Movable bridges and replacements ===
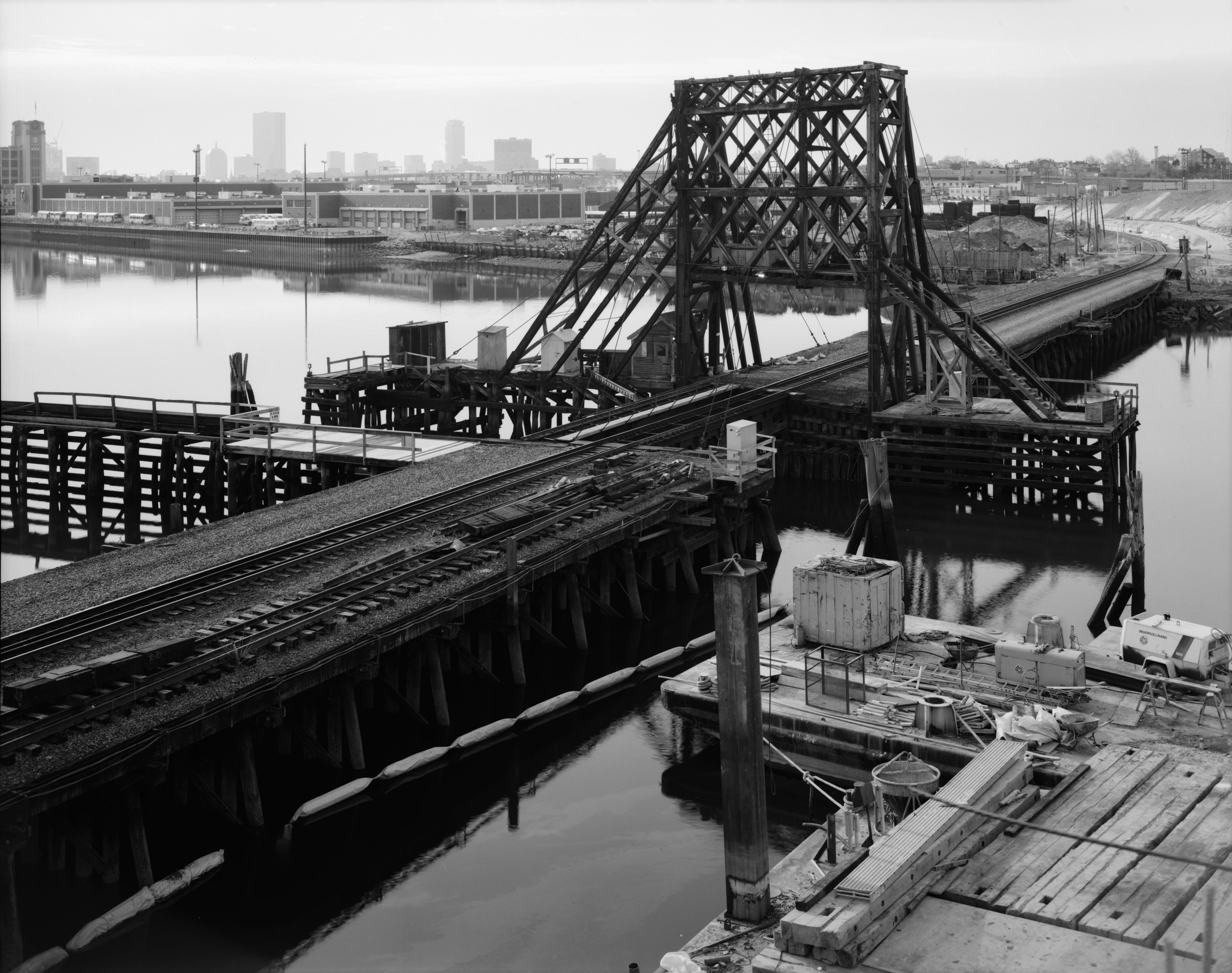
Draw Number 7 shortly before replacement

Owing to its position along the North Shore coastline, the Newburyport/Rockport Line has a large number of river crossings, including movable bridges over the Saugus River and Danvers River on the mainline as well as Days Creek and the Annisquam River on the Rockport Branch. Draw Number 7 over the Mystic River between Somerville and Everett, built in 1877, was the oldest horizontally folding drawbridge in the country until it was replaced by a fixed high-level concrete span on August 26, 1989. The new $34.2-million bridge, which was completed nine months ahead of schedule, eliminated the 5-mile-per-hour (8.0 km/h) speed restriction on the old bridge.

The Beverly Drawbridge spanning the Danvers River was replaced in 2017. The abutments of the approach spans were repaired, followed by a 21-day service shutdown from July 17 to August 13, 2017, for the complete replacement of the swing bridge section. The MBTA Board approved the $16.2-million contract in February 2016; work will last from March 2016 to December 2017. The line was shut down on weekends from July 8 through August 27, 2017, for the installation of Positive Train Control equipment in order to meet a 2020 federal deadline; four of those weekends overlapped with the already planned service curtailments for drawbridge work.

The Gloucester Drawbridge over the Annisquam River formerly consisted of a steel drawbridge and western approach span with a timber trestle for the eastern approach. It was built in 1911, modified in 1932, and substantially repaired in 1984–85. It was completely replaced with a modern box beam bridge on steel piles. By February 2016, bidding was planned to begin by June for the four-year, then-$34-million project, though funding had not been allotted. The MBTA Board approved a $56.9-million contract in October 2017; funding is split between federal and state funds. The 44-month project was to require 10 weekend shutdowns of the branch. All service between West Gloucester and Rockport was replaced by buses from June 1 to 30, 2019 to allow for construction.

On April 29, 2020, service between West Gloucester and Rockport was indefinitely replaced by buses due to a failure of the old bridge. That June, the MBTA indicated the closure would continue until the completion of the bridge replacement in mid-2021. In October 2020, weekend service was modified with the outbound bus connection at Manchester, so that trains could idle between the two stations. This was repeated with weekday service on November 2, 2020. On April 5, 2021, weekend bus shuttles were changed to run between Beverly and Rockport. Other work during the closure included replacement of 11,000 wood ties with plastic ties, replacement of 12 culverts, and replacement of an old spring switch east of the drawbridge with a modern interlocking. Portions of the line are being replaced by buses in several phases from April 11 to June 5, 2022, to allow for several construction projects including the completion of the drawbridge. Regular service to Rockport over the bridge resumed on May 23, 2022. Work on the bridge was completed in December 2022.

The MBTA plans to replace the Saugus River drawbridge in the mid-to-late 2020s.

=== COVID-19 changes ===
Substantially reduced schedules due to the COVID-19 pandemic were in effect from March 16 to June 23, 2020. Schedule changes effective November 2, 2020 shifted some peak service to off-peak, providing 30-minute midday headways on the inner portion of the line, as part of a transition to a regional rail model. The final Newburyport-bound train on weekdays began operating as a shuttle from Salem, with a transfer from a Rockport-bound train. In November 2020, as part of service cuts during the pandemic, the MBTA proposed to close Prides Crossing along with five other low-ridership stations on other lines. On December 14, the MBTA Board voted to enact a more limited set of cuts, including indefinitely closing Prides Crossing and four of the other five stations. That day, temporary reduced schedules were again put into place, with Prides Crossing not served. Full service resumed on April 5, 2021, with Prides Crossing still closed.

As of February 2022, weekday service had 12 Boston–West Gloucester round trips, 13 Boston–Newburyport round trips, three Boston–Beverly round trips, and one Salem–Newburyport outbound trip. Weekend service had nine round trips on each branch, with no short turns. A series of partial and complete closures of the line took place from March 5 to June 12, 2022, to allow for signal construction work. Several shorter closures took place in July through September. By October 2022, the line had 11,333 daily riders — 76% of pre-COVID ridership.

Lynn station temporarily closed on October 1, 2022, pending a reconstruction project; an interim station opened on December 18, 2023. Rockport Branch service was replaced by buses from October 15 to December 18, 2022, for the final phase of signal work. All trips on the line were reduced to Zone 1A fares (the least expensive) from July 1 to August 31, 2023, during a closure of the Sumner Tunnel. Four weekday round trips were cut from March 24 to June 1, 2025, to accommodate track work. On October 27, 2025, the final weekday Rockport-bound was changed to originate at North Station rather than requiring a transfer at Salem.

=== Proposed electrification ===
In April 2021, the MBTA indicated plans to electrify the line between Boston and Beverly Depot as part of its regional rail modernization initiative. Studies for facility needs and traction power were noted as being funded, while design and planning for required infrastructure changes were not. In June 2022, the MBTA indicated plans to begin service with battery electric multiple units on the line in 2031. The section from Chelsea to Hamilton/Wenham and Manchester (save for the Salem Tunnel) would have overhead wires. A light maintenance facility would be constructed near Salem. Improvements to a turnback track near Beverly are planned to allow more frequent diesel service in the interim. By the mid-2020s, the MBTA had adapted short-term plans for regional rail to instead optimize diesel-hauled operations for increased services on select corridors. BEMUs would be implemented as part of a later regional rail improvement phase in the late 2030s.

== Station listing ==
State	Fare zone	Location	Miles (km)	Station	Connections and notes
MA	1A	Boston	0.0 (0.0)	North Station	Amtrak: Downeaster; MBTA Commuter Rail: Fitchburg Line, Lowell Line, Haverhill Line; MBTA subway: Orange Line, Green Line (D and E branches); MBTA bus: 4 EZRide; MBTA ferry: F10; Seaport Ferry
MA	1A	Chelsea	4.1 (6.6)	Chelsea	MBTA subway: Silver Line (SL3); MBTA bus: 112, 114; Was located 0.4 miles (0.6 km) to the east until 2021
MA	2	Lynn	9.9 (15.9)	River Works	For River Works employees only
MA	2	Lynn	11.5 (18.5)	Lynn	MBTA bus: 426, 426W, 429, 435, 436, 439, 441, 442, 455, 456
MA	3	Swampscott	12.8 (20.6)	Swampscott	
MA	3	Salem	16.8 (27.0)	Salem	MBTA bus: 450, 450W, 451, 455, 456, 465; Was located 0.5 miles (0.8 km) to the south until 1987
MA	4	Beverly	18.3 (29.5)	Beverly Depot	CATA: 9 Split with Gloucester Branch
MA	5	Beverly	20.8 (33.5)	North Beverly	MBTA bus: 451
MA	5	Hamilton	22.7 (36.5)	Hamilton/Wenham	
MA	6	Ipswich	27.6 (44.4)	Ipswich	CATA: 12 (seasonal)
MA	7	Rowley	31.2 (50.2)	Rowley	
MA	8	Newburyport	36.2 (58.3)	Newburyport	MVRTA: 11, 19, 20; Pre-1976 location was 1.1 miles (1.8 km) north
NH		Hampton	46.5 (74.8)	Hampton	Closed January 4, 1965
NH		North Hampton	48.7 (78.4)	North Hampton	Closed January 4, 1965
NH		Portsmouth	56.9 (91.6)	Portsmouth	Closed January 4, 1965
Closed station

=== Gloucester Branch ===
Fare zone	Location	Miles (km)	Station	Connections and notes
4	Beverly	18.3 (29.5)	Beverly Depot	CATA: 9 Split from main line
4	Beverly	19.8 (31.9)	Montserrat	
5	Beverly	22.2 (35.7)	Prides Crossing	Closed January 23, 2021
5	Beverly	22.9 (36.9)	Beverly Farms	
6	Manchester-by-the-Sea	25.4 (40.9)	Manchester	
7	Gloucester	29.6 (47.6)	West Gloucester	CATA: 5
7	Gloucester	30.6 (49.2)	Harbor	Closed January 7, 1985
7	Gloucester	31.6 (50.9)	Gloucester	CATA: 2, 2A, 3, 4, 7, 9, 11 (seasonal)
8	Rockport	35.3 (56.8)	Rockport	CATA: 3, 9, 10 (seasonal)
Closed station

== Gallery ==
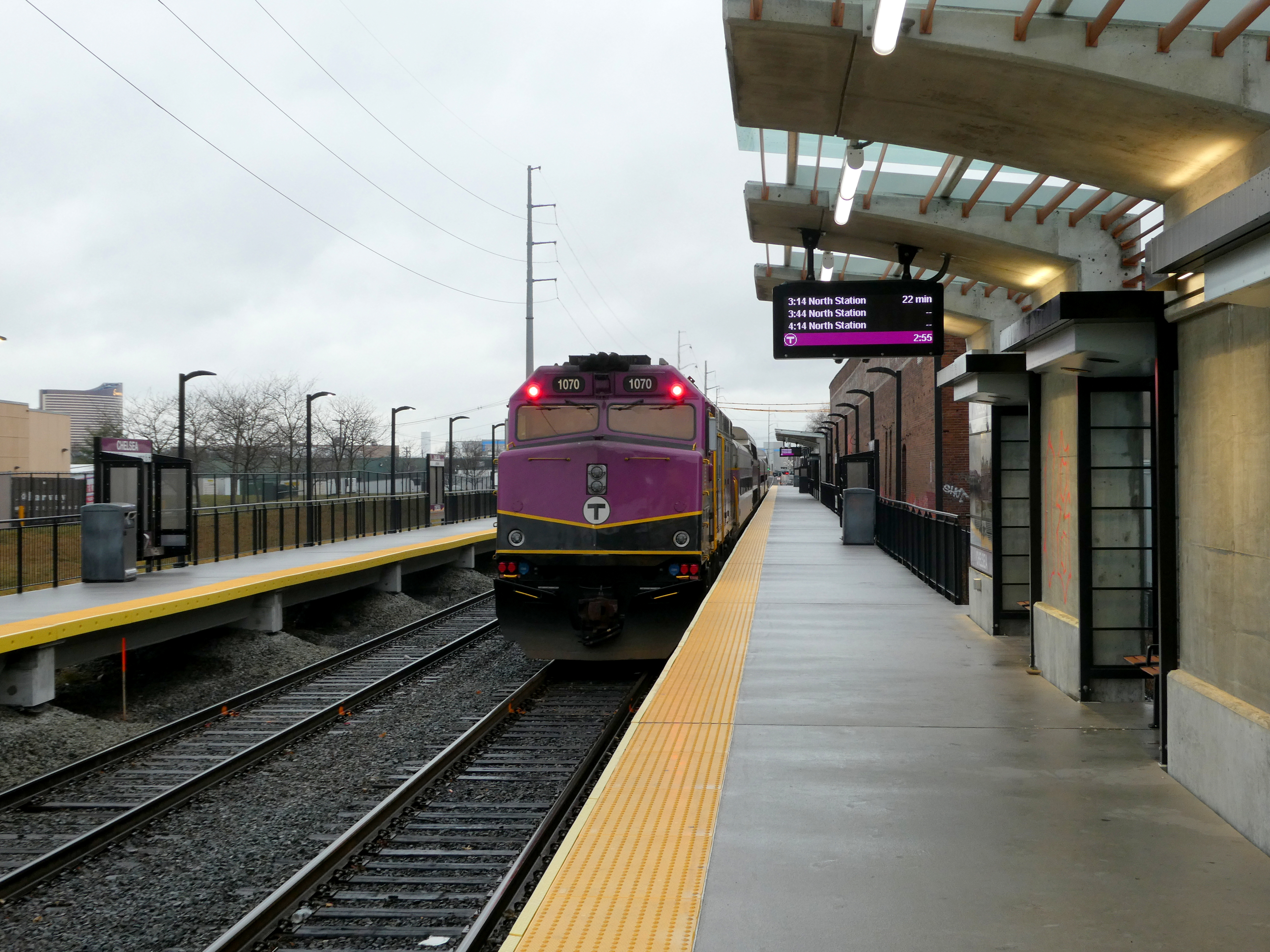
Chelsea Station

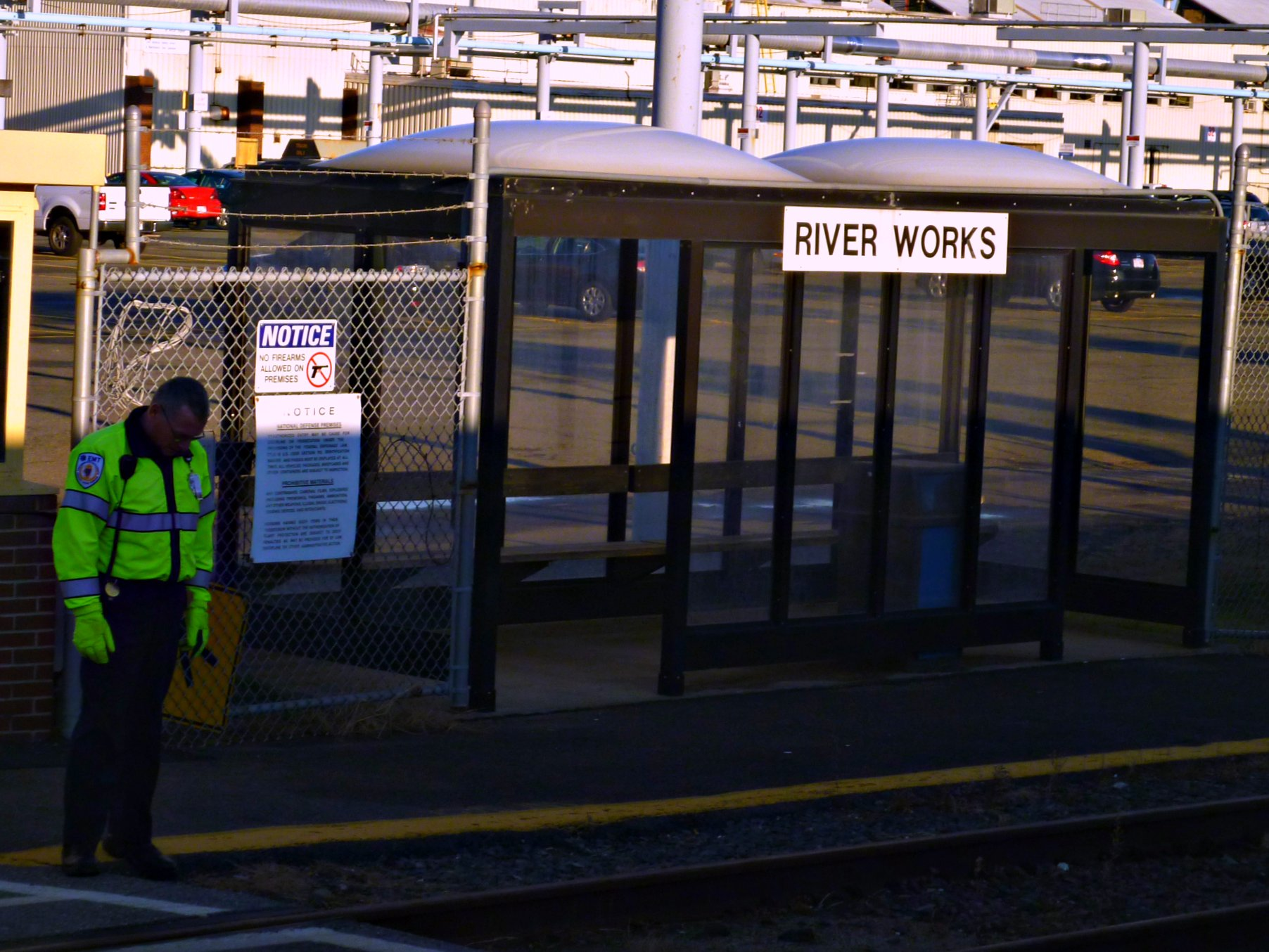
River Works

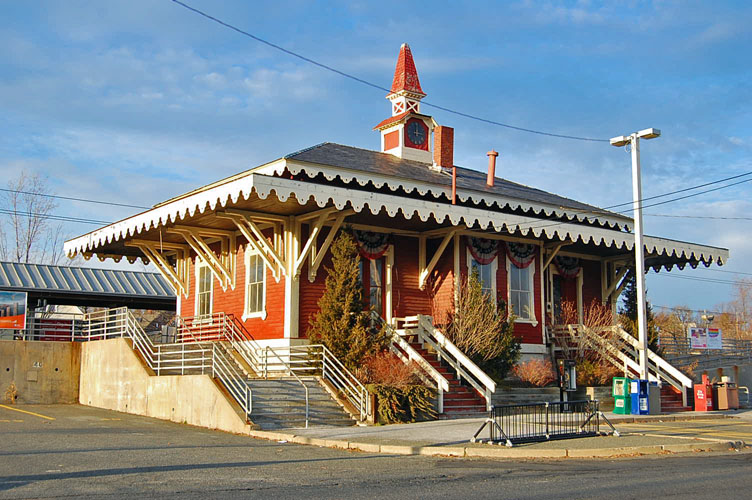
Swampscott

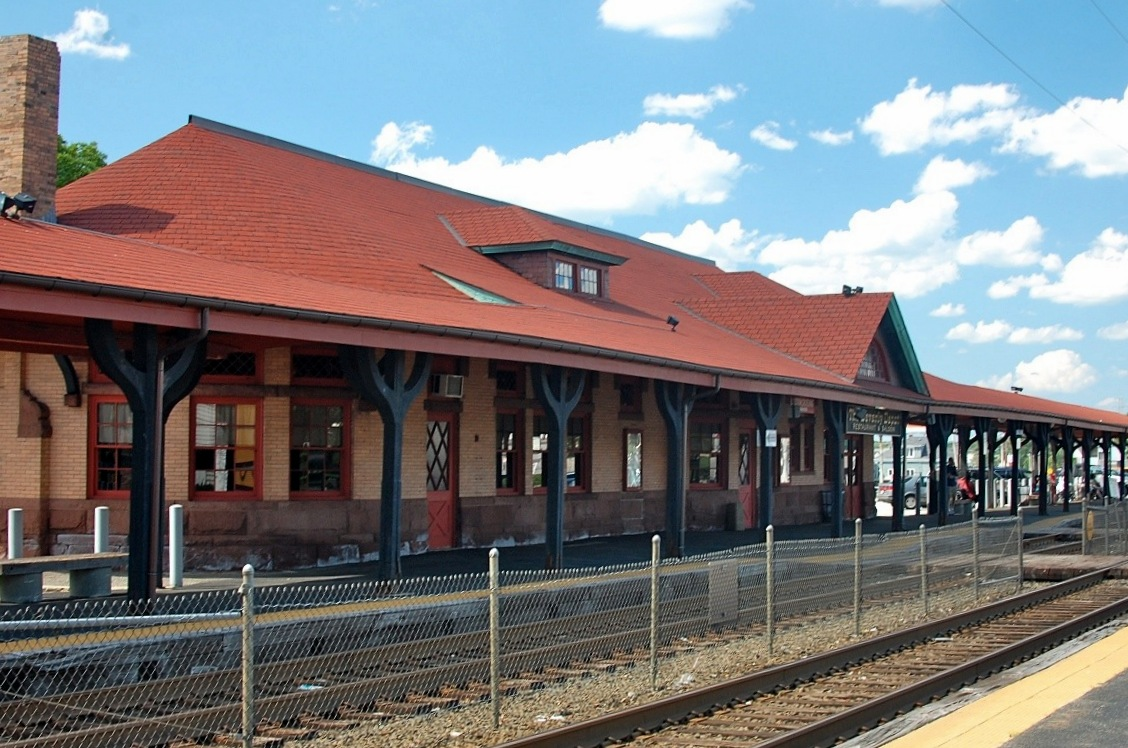
Beverly Depot

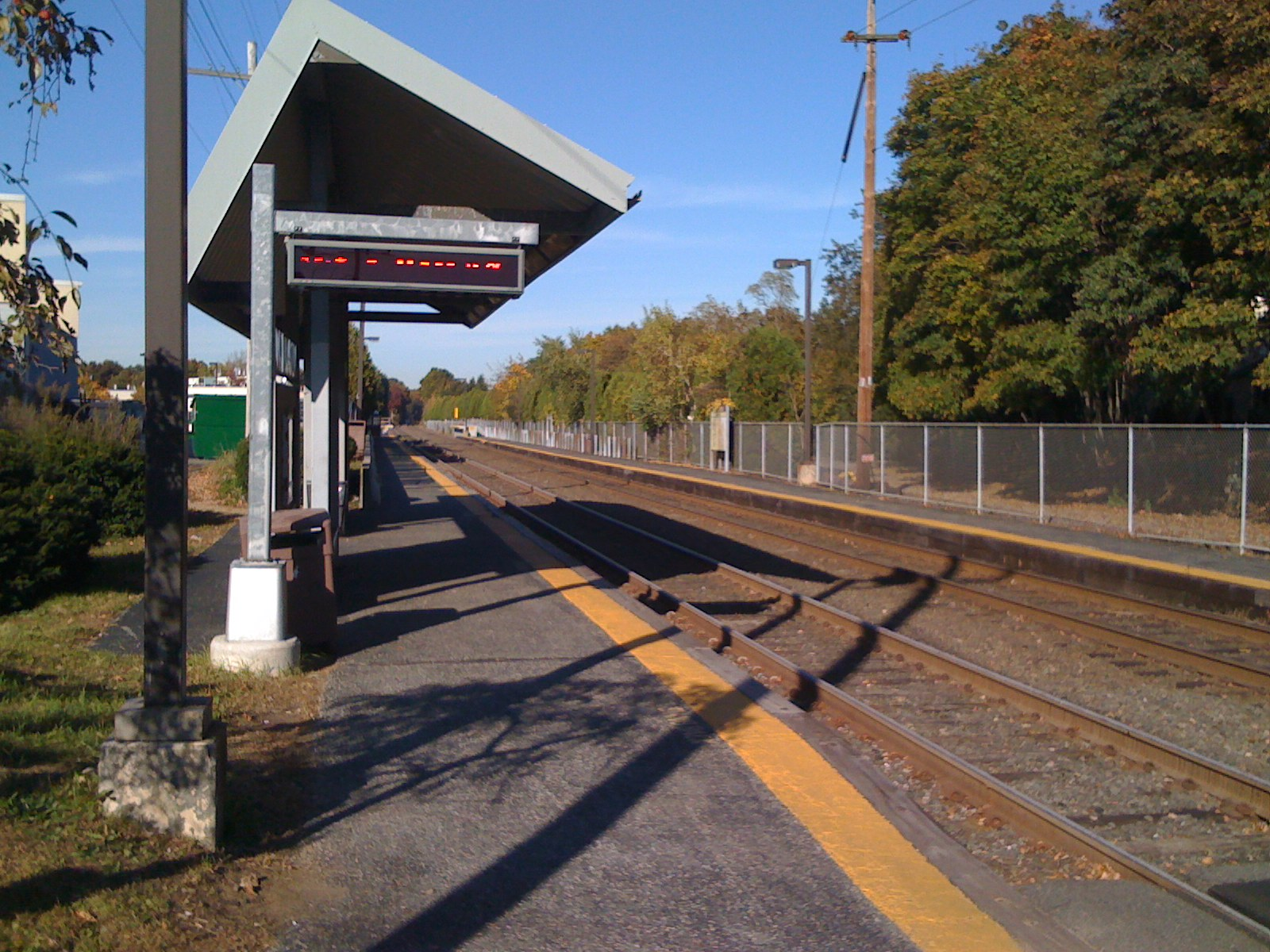
North Beverly

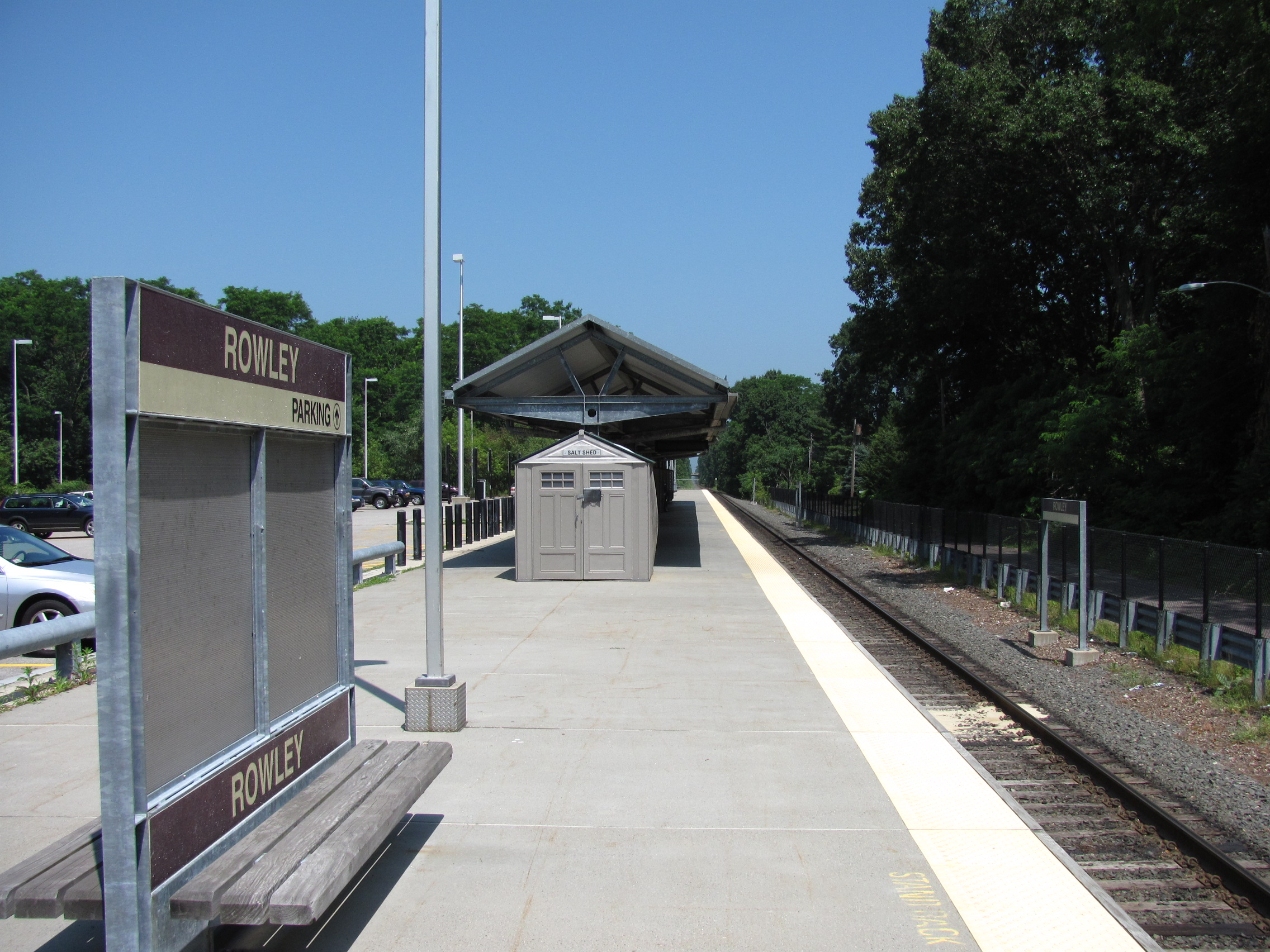
Rowley

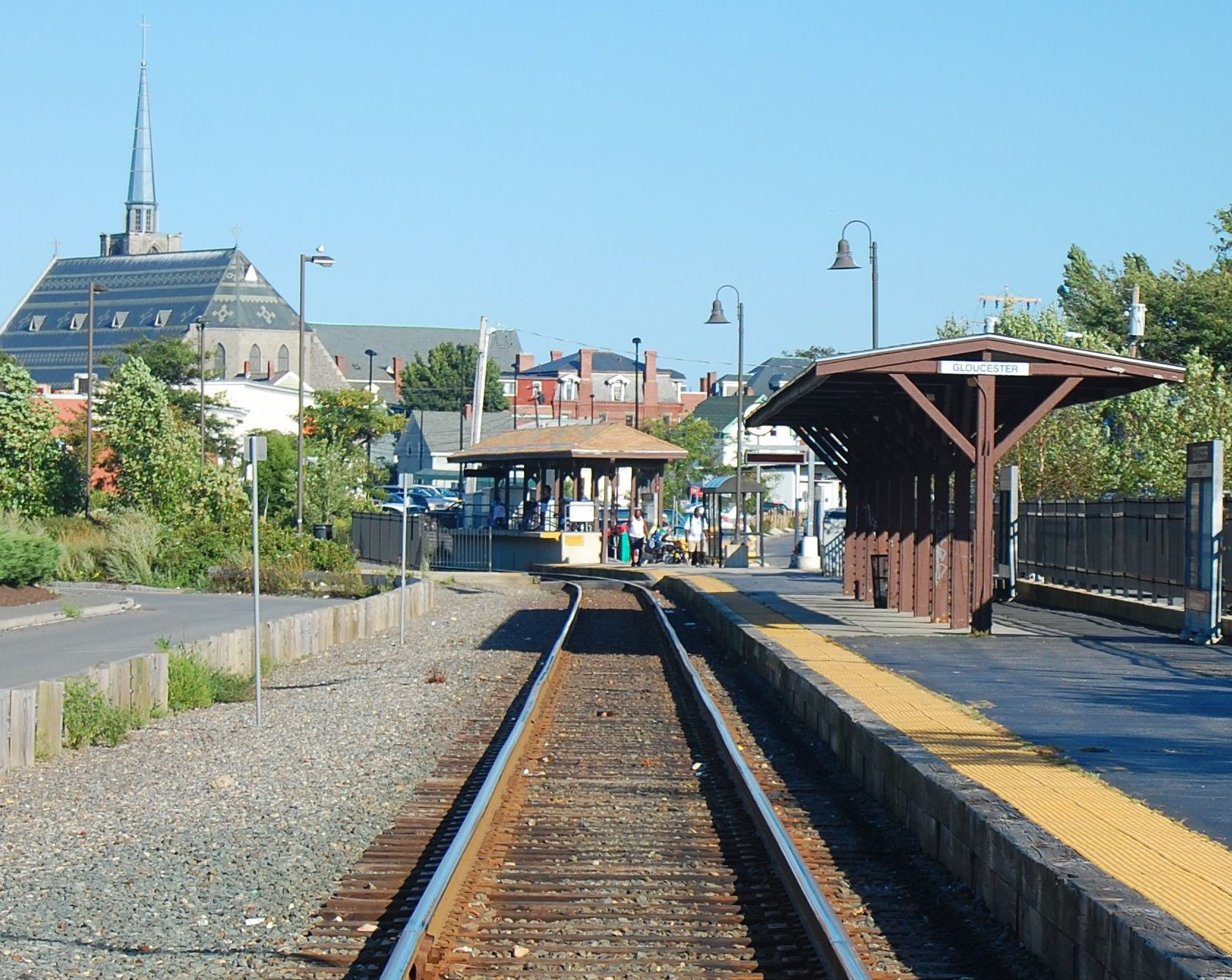
Gloucester

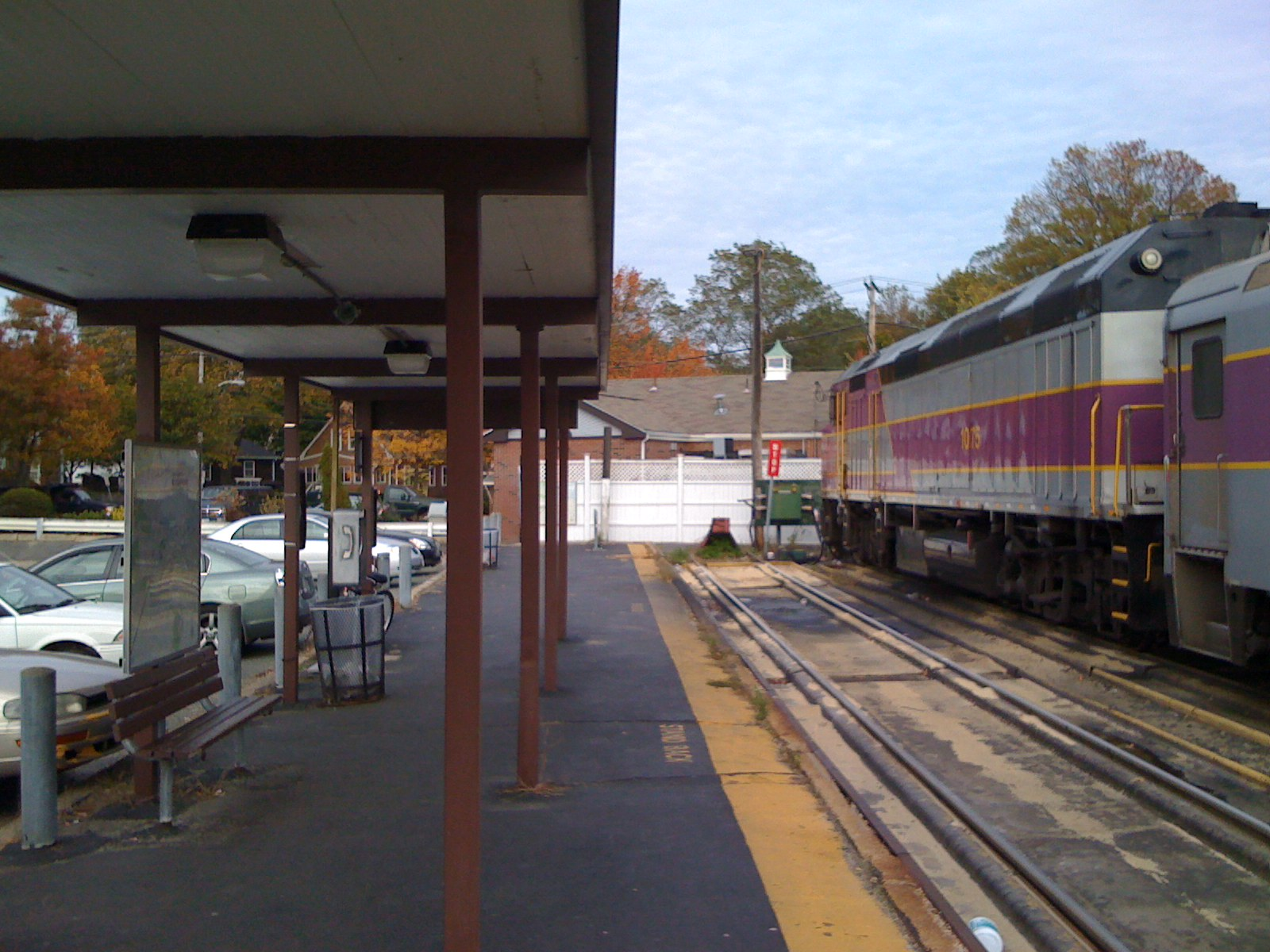
Rockport
