= North Beverly station =

Railway station in Beverly, Massachusetts

North Beverly
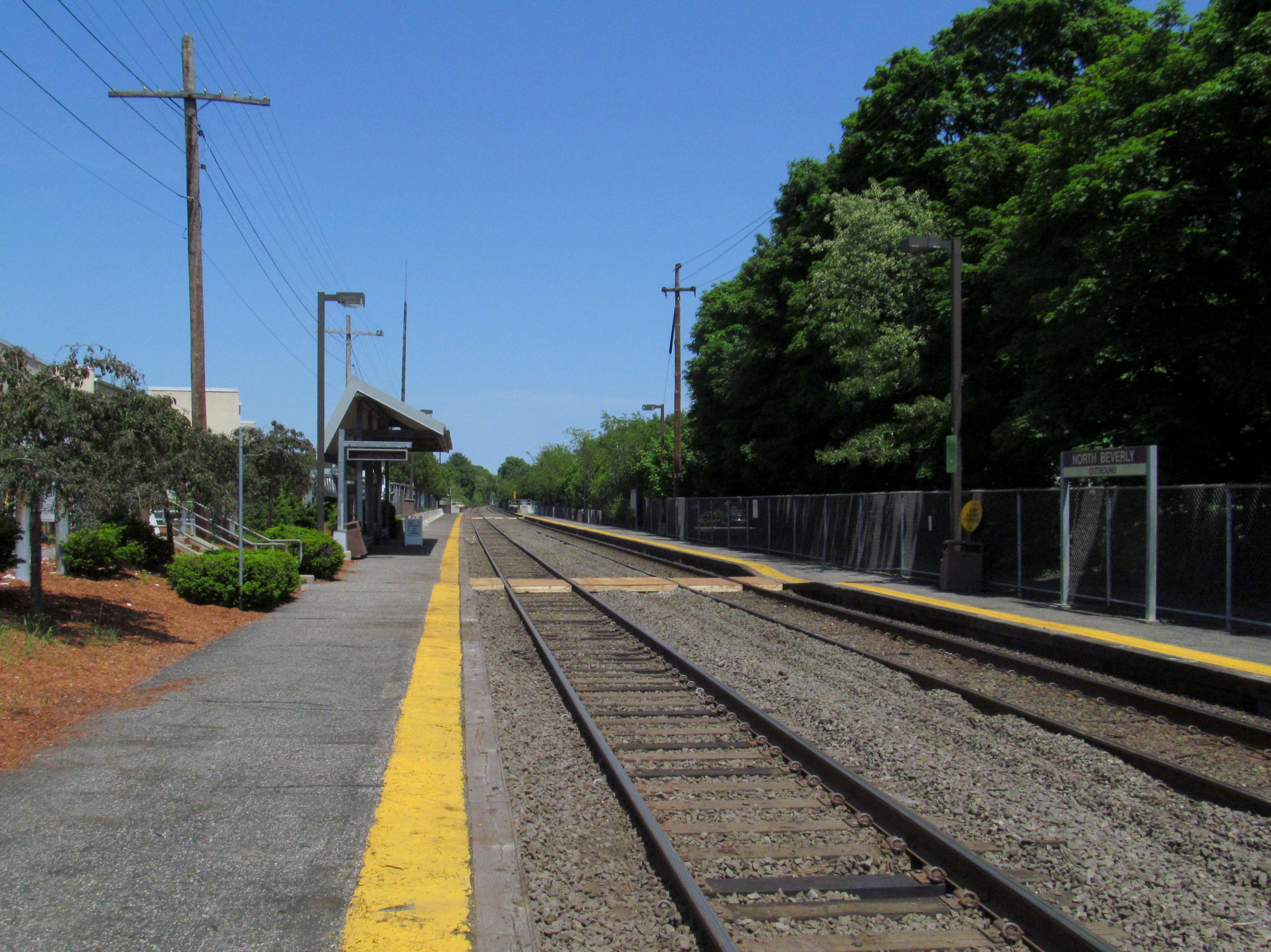
- North Beverly station in May 2012

General information
- Location: Enon Street and Dodge Street; Beverly, Massachusetts
- Coordinates: 42.5840°N 70.8838°W
- Line: Eastern Route
- Platforms: 2 side platforms
- Tracks: 2
- Connections: MBTA bus: 451

Construction
- Parking: 87 spaces ($4.00 daily)
- Accessible: Yes

Other information
- Fare zone: 5

History
- Opened: c. 1850s

Passengers
- 2024: 170 daily boardings

Services
Preceding station	MBTA	Following station
Beverly toward North Station	Newburyport/Rockport Line	Hamilton/Wenham toward Newburyport
Location

North Beverly station is an MBTA Commuter Rail station in Beverly, Massachusetts. Located in North Beverly, it serves the Newburyport/Rockport Line. The station has two low side platforms serving the line's two tracks, with mini-high platforms to provide accessibility.

The station originally opened by the mid-1850s. The station building was converted to a hamburger stand by 1968, but later demolished. As of May 2021, improvements to the accessible mini-high platforms are in design.
