= MBTA Commuter Rail Maintenance Facility =

Train depot in Somerville, Massachusetts

Boston Engine Terminal
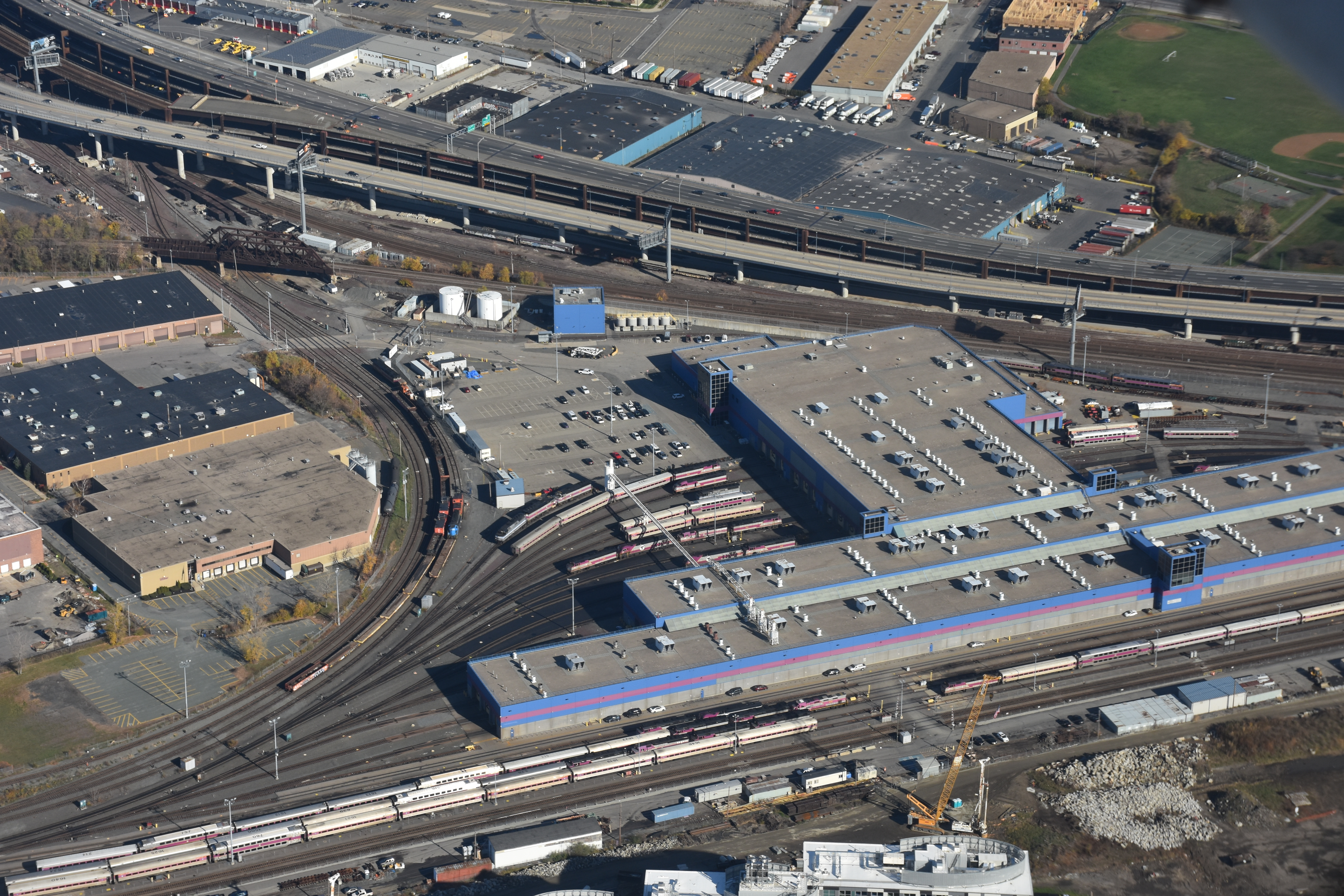
- Aerial view of the facility in 2015

General information
- Location: Somerville, Massachusetts
- Coordinates: 42°22′30″N 71°4′33″W
- Owner: MBTA

History
- Opened: March 25, 1998

Services
Preceding station	MBTA	Following station
Porter toward Wachusett	Fitchburg Line	North Station Terminus
West Medford toward Lowell	Lowell Line	North Station Terminus
North Station Terminus	Haverhill Line Limited service	West Medford toward Haverhill
North Station Terminus	Haverhill Line	Malden Center toward Haverhill
North Station Terminus	Newburyport/Rockport Line	Chelsea toward Newburyport or Rockport
Location

The MBTA Commuter Rail Maintenance Facility (signed as, and often known by, its former name of Boston Engine Terminal) is the primary train maintenance repair facility for the MBTA Commuter Rail system. It is located in the Inner Belt area of Somerville, Massachusetts, near North Station in Boston. The present Commuter Rail Maintenance Facility was built from 1995 to 1998, replacing the Boston Engine Terminal which was built by the former Boston and Maine Railroad. The present facility opened on March 25, 1998.

Three small platforms on asphalt crossings serve as flag stops for MBTA employees only. One platform serves the Fitchburg Line, another the Lowell Line, and a third the Haverhill Line and Newburyport/Rockport Line (which split a mile north of the CRMF).

It was considered as a possible location for a light rail maintenance facility for the under-construction Green Line Extension. The Green Line facility was ultimately built on an industrial site just west of the Commuter Rail facility.
