= Manchester station (MBTA) =

Railway station in Manchester-by-the-Sea, Massachusetts

Manchester By The Sea
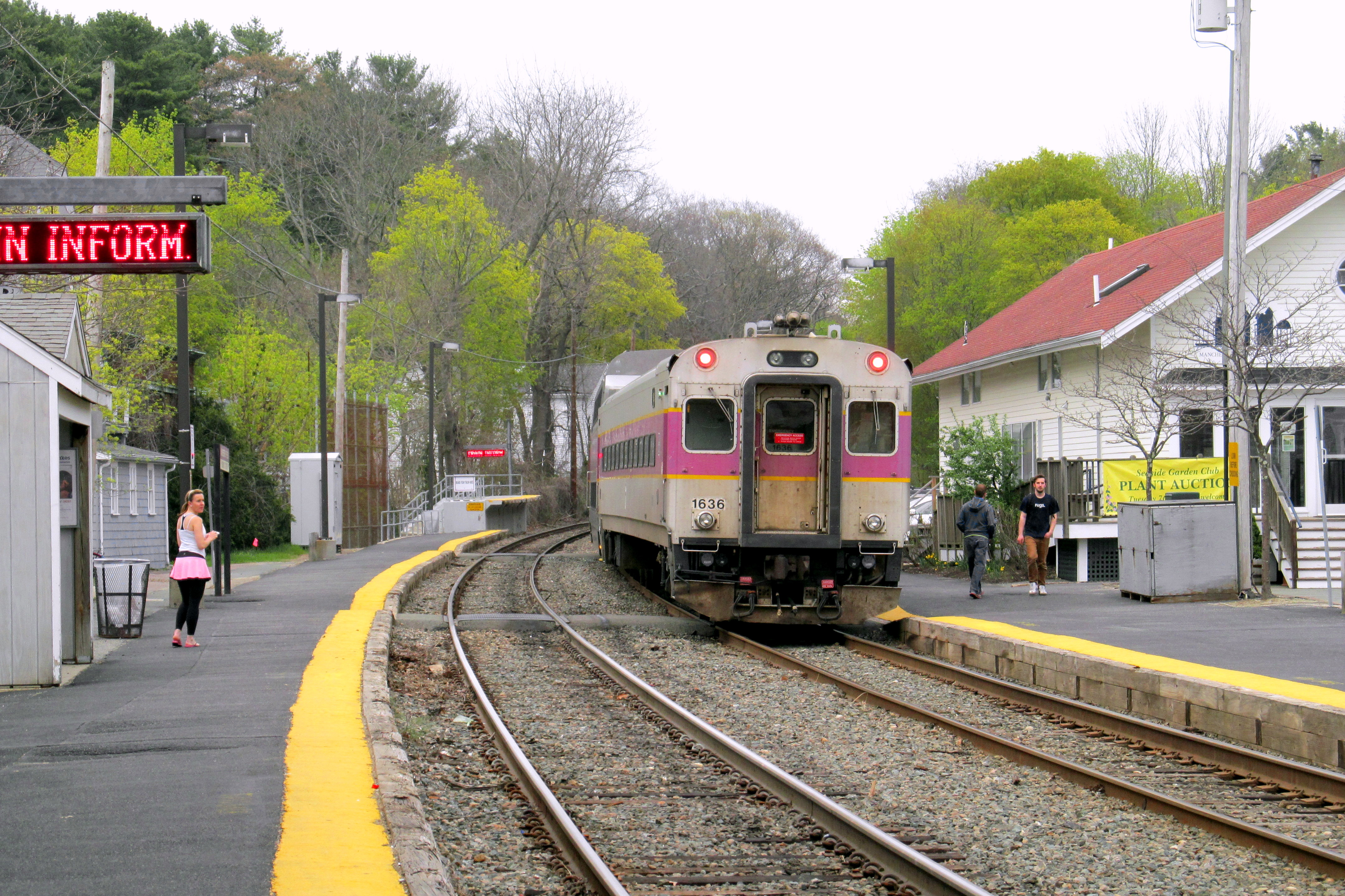
- An outbound train at Manchester station in 2014

General information
- Location: 40 Beach Street; Manchester-by-the-Sea, Massachusetts
- Coordinates: 42.5740°N 70.7691°W
- Line: Gloucester Branch
- Platforms: 2 side platforms
- Tracks: 2

Construction
- Parking: 71 spaces (free)
- Cycle facilities: 7 spaces
- Accessible: Yes

Other information
- Fare zone: 6

Passengers
- 2024: 121 daily boardings

Services
Preceding station	MBTA	Following station
Beverly Farms toward North Station	Newburyport/Rockport Line	West Gloucester toward Rockport
Location

Manchester station (signed as Manchester by the Sea) is an MBTA Commuter Rail Newburyport/Rockport Line station in Manchester-by-the-Sea, Massachusetts. The station is accessible, with mini-high platforms at the outbound end of the platform.

== History ==
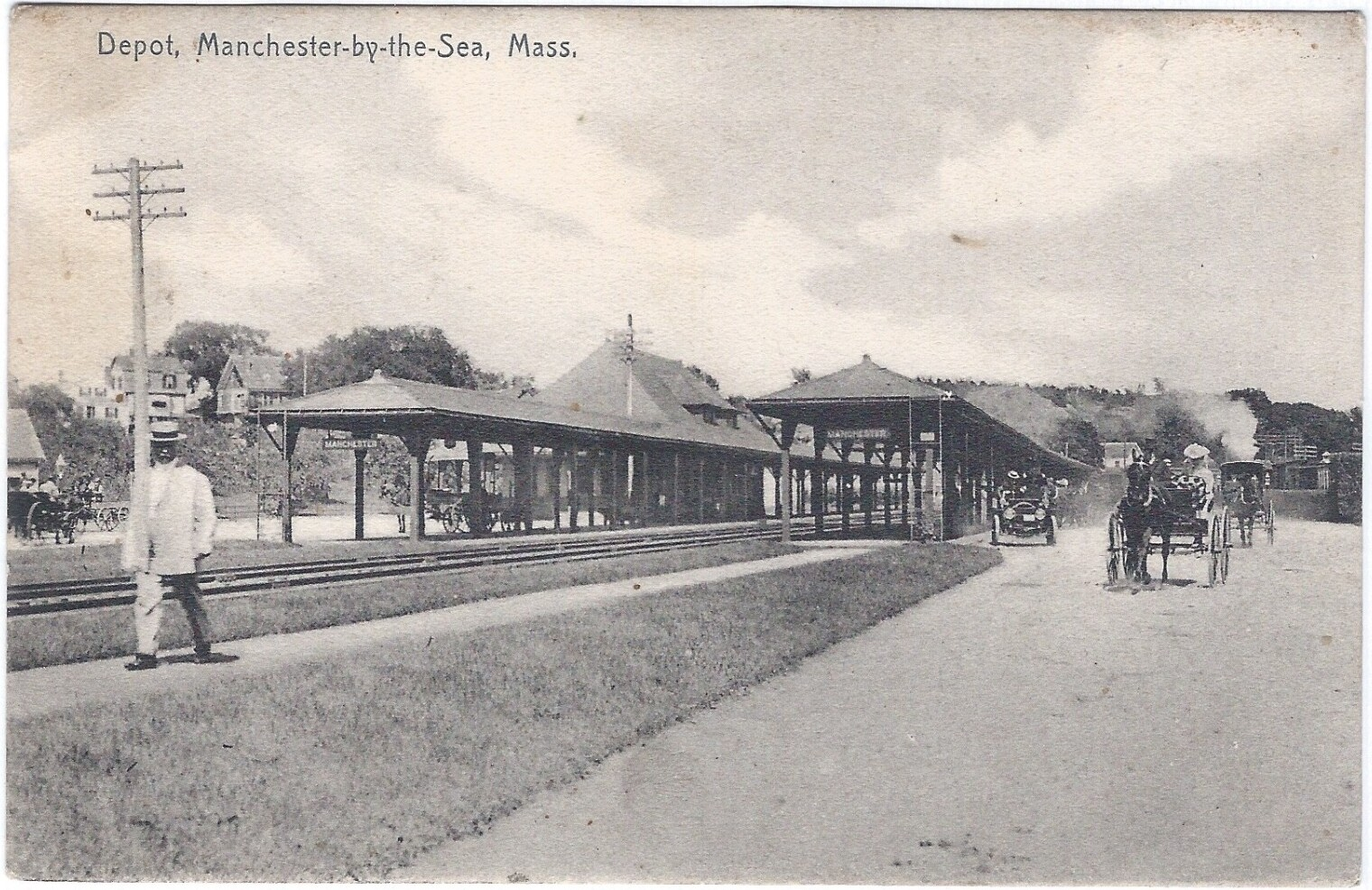
An early-20th-century postcard of the 1895-built depot

The Gloucester Branch opened from Beverly to Manchester in August 1847. It was extended to Gloucester station in December 1847, and to Rockport in November 1861. The line later passed to the Eastern Railroad, which itself was absorbed by the Boston and Maine Railroad (B&M).

The original passenger station was replaced by a newer station in 1895. Neither survive, but the original freight house is present and used as a community center. West Manchester station, which was located on Boardman Street, was closed in early 1940.

When the Massachusetts Bay Transportation Authority (MBTA) was formed in August 1964 to subsidize suburban commuter service, Manchester was the northeast limit of its funding district. On January 18, 1965, the B&M cut Gloucester Branch service back to Manchester. After Gloucester and Rockport reached funding deals to subsidize out-of-district operations, full service was returned to Rockport on June 28, 1965. The 1895-built station was demolished by 1977 and replaced by a laundromat.
