= Beverly Depot =

Train station in Beverly, Massachusetts, US

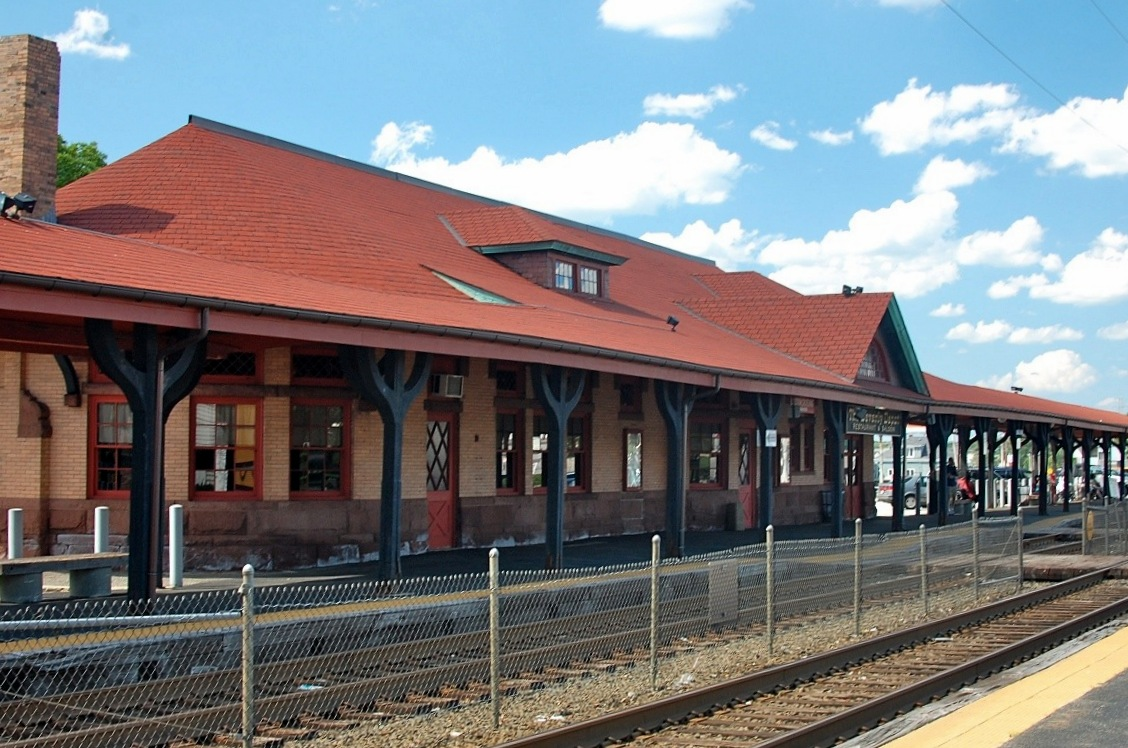
- Beverly Depot in July 2010

General information
- Location: 12 Park Street; Beverly, Massachusetts
- Coordinates: 42.54760°N 70.88535°W
- Lines: Eastern Route; Gloucester Branch
- Platforms: 2 side platforms
- Tracks: 2
- Connections: CATA: 9

Construction
- Parking: 500 spaces ($5.00 fee)
- Cycle facilities: "Pedal and Park" bicycle cage
- Accessible: Yes

Other information
- Fare zone: 4

History
- Opened: 1839
- Rebuilt: 1897

Passengers
- 2024: 1,011 daily boardings

Services
Preceding station	MBTA	Following station
Salem toward North Station	Newburyport/Rockport Line	Montserrat toward Rockport
Salem toward North Station	Newburyport/Rockport Line	North Beverly toward Newburyport
- Beverly Depot
- U.S. National Register of Historic Places
- NRHP reference No.: 09000087
- Added to NRHP: October 11, 1979
Location

Beverly Depot is an MBTA Commuter Rail station in Beverly, Massachusetts. Located in Downtown Beverly, it serves the Newburyport/Rockport Line. It is the junction of the line's two branches to Newburyport and Rockport and is served by every train on both branches.

The Eastern Railroad was extended through Beverly to Ipswich in 1839. The 1839 station was replaced in 1855; that station was in turn replaced by one designed by Bradford Lee Gilbert in 1897. The station was listed on the National Register of Historic Places in 1979; it is a contributing property of the Beverly Depot-Odell Park Historic District, which was added in 2014. A 500-space parking garage at Beverly opened on August 2, 2014.

== History ==
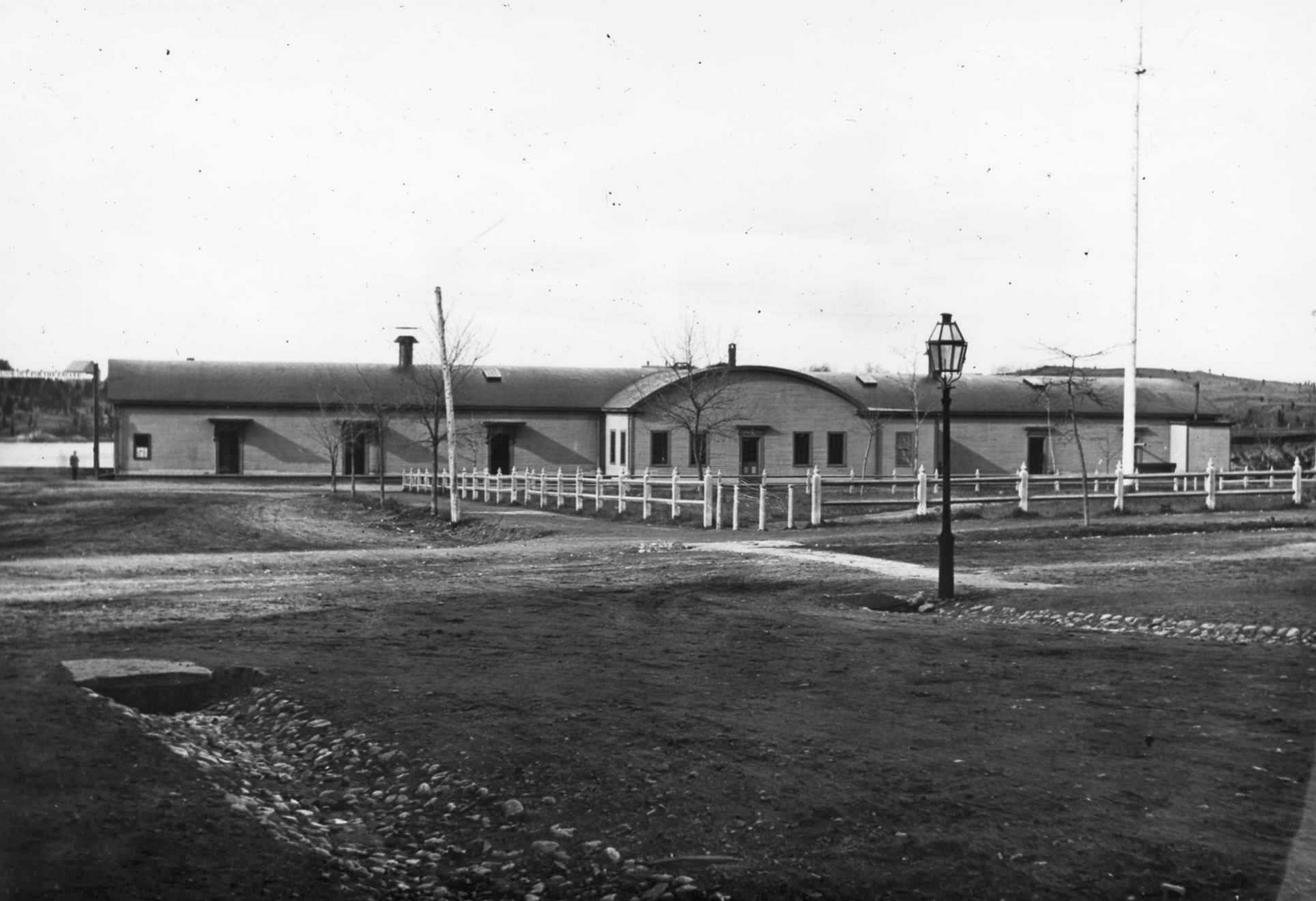
The 1855-built depot around 1890

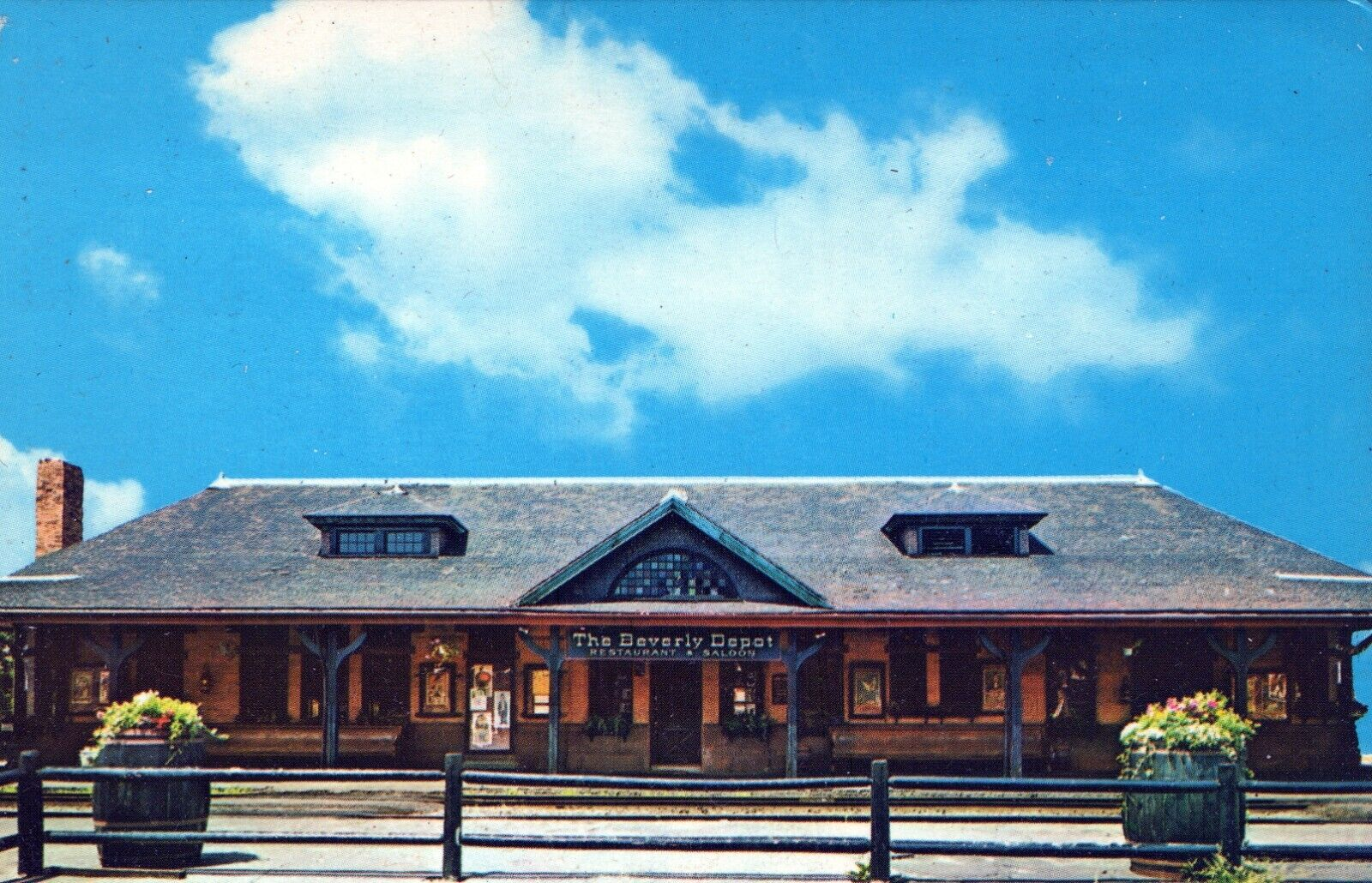
The station building around 1972

The Eastern Railroad was extended from Salem to Ipswich via Beverly on December 18, 1839. One of the difficulties in constructing the extension was blasting a 700-foot (210 m)-long cut through a ridge near School Street in Beverly. The Beverly station, a low wooden structure, was located at the north end of the Essex Bridge in the town's developed southern tip. The Gloucester Branch opened from Beverly to Manchester on August 3, 1847, and to Gloucester on December 1.

As the population of Gloucester grew, development spread northwards along Cabot Street. Rantoul Street was laid out in 1851 parallel to the Eastern Railroad. The 1839-built depot may have been moved north near Rantoul Street in 1852. (Note: A 1986 state report claims that the original station was moved in 1852. The 2013 documentation for the Beverly Depot–Odell Park Historic District claims that the second depot was built in 1852 (a claim not supported by other sources) based on an 1852 map showing a station at Park Street.)

Its 1855 replacement was a larger wooden building with a train shed at the modern site. In 1890, a local citizens group hired Charles Eliot to design improvements to the station grounds. The work was paid for by the private group, as the railroad refused to contribute other than donating some labor and materials. The train shed was torn down for the 1897 construction of the Bradford Lee Gilbert station that still stands. A copy was built ten years later at Andover.

The ticket office closed in 1965 with passenger traffic in free fall as the newly formed MBTA began to subsidize service to Beverly. The station building was sold soon after, and was converted to an antique store by 1968. It partially burned on February 15, 1971, but was renovated and reopened as a restaurant by that December. The building was listed on the National Register of Historic Places in 1979. The modern station facilities, located adjacent to the depot building, consist of two platforms serving the line's two tracks. Short high-level platforms are located on the outbound end of the longer low-level platforms, making the station accessible.

On November 16, 1984, the Beverly Bridge, which carried the line between Salem and Beverly, was destroyed by a fire. For 13 months, Beverly was the connection point between a Salem-Beverly-Ipswich shuttle bus and a Beverly-Rockport shuttle train. Regular service over a new bridge was restored on December 1, 1985.

=== Garage ===
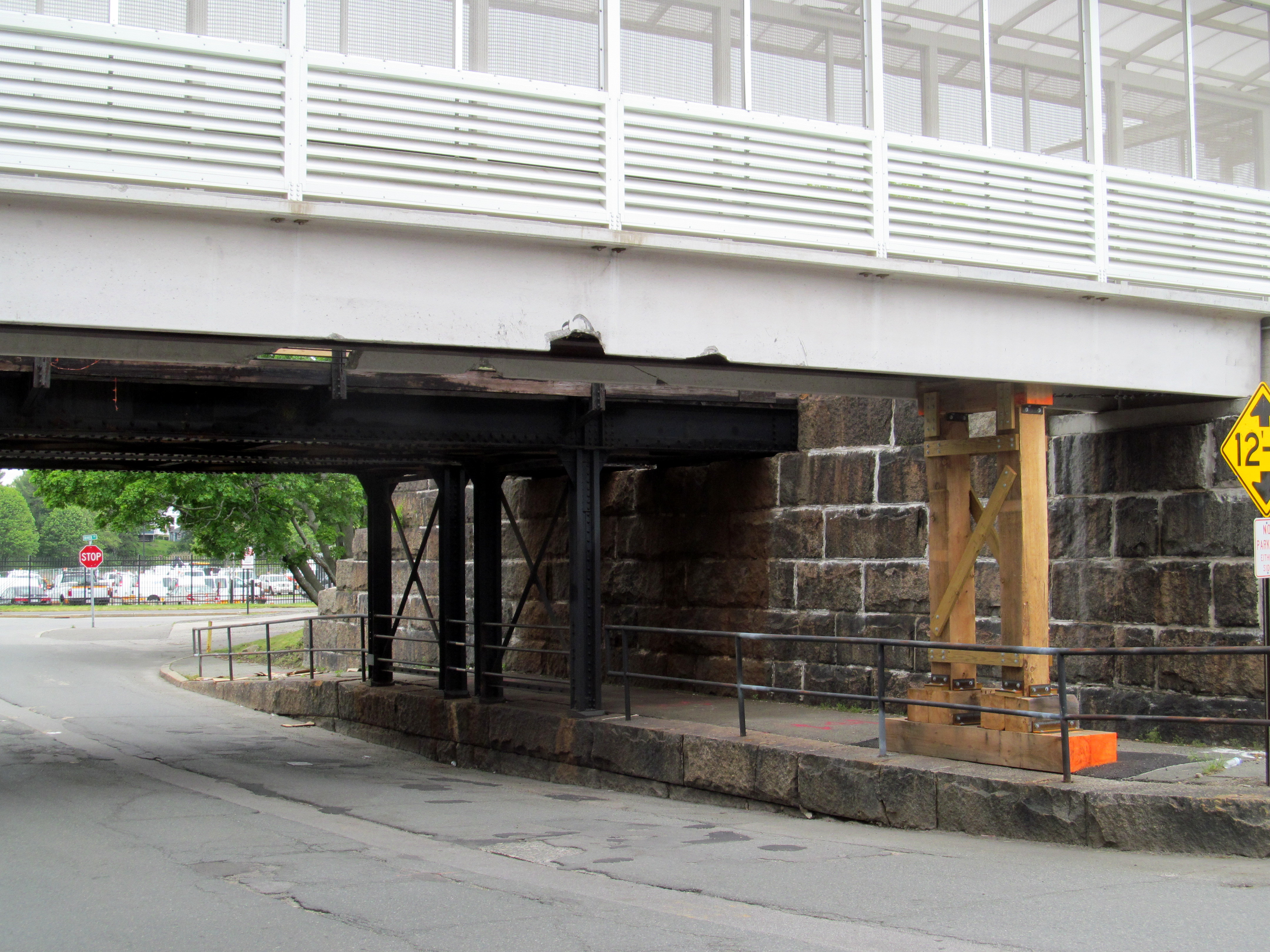
The damaged pedestrian bridge in May 2017

In April 2007, the MBTA announced plans to expand the parking lot and replace the mini-high platforms, with a garage to be added later. However, in June 2008, then-governor Deval Patrick announced plans to build the parking garage. In June 2009, the MBTA chose a site one block south of the station. As part of environmental mitigation for increased urban auto traffic enabled by the Big Dig, the state was required to add 1,000 parking spaces to MBTA stations by the end of 2011. Garages at Salem and Beverly were originally to fill this requirement, but when it became clear that neither would be finished in 2011, additional parking at Wonderland, Woodland, Savin Hill, and the Quincy ferry terminal were used to satisfy it.

On September 15, 2012, the MBTA approved $25 million in funding for the new parking garage. The three-story, 500-space garage more than quintupled former parking capacity and included facilities such as electric car charging stations and roof-mounted solar panels as well as a covered walkway leading over Pleasant Street to the station platforms. It was also designed to accommodate future transit oriented development next to the garage on Rantoul Street and up to four stories on air rights over the garage.

The $34.1 million project began construction in February 2013 after several months of delays. The garage was originally planned to open in December 2013, but the opening was delayed several times due to construction difficulties. A retaining wall required additional reinforcement, unusually cold winter temperatures prevented contractors from pouring concrete, and contaminated soil had to be unexpectedly brought to out-of-state disposal locations when in-state facilities closed. The city of Beverly contributed $500,000 in city funds to cover additional construction costs from these delays.

The garage ultimately opened on August 2, 2014. After four weeks, only 100 of the 500 spaces were being used on a daily basis. By September 2015, usage averaged 260 cars on weekdays. On April 3, 2017, the pedestrian bridge linking the garage and station was damaged by an oversized load on a flatbed truck.

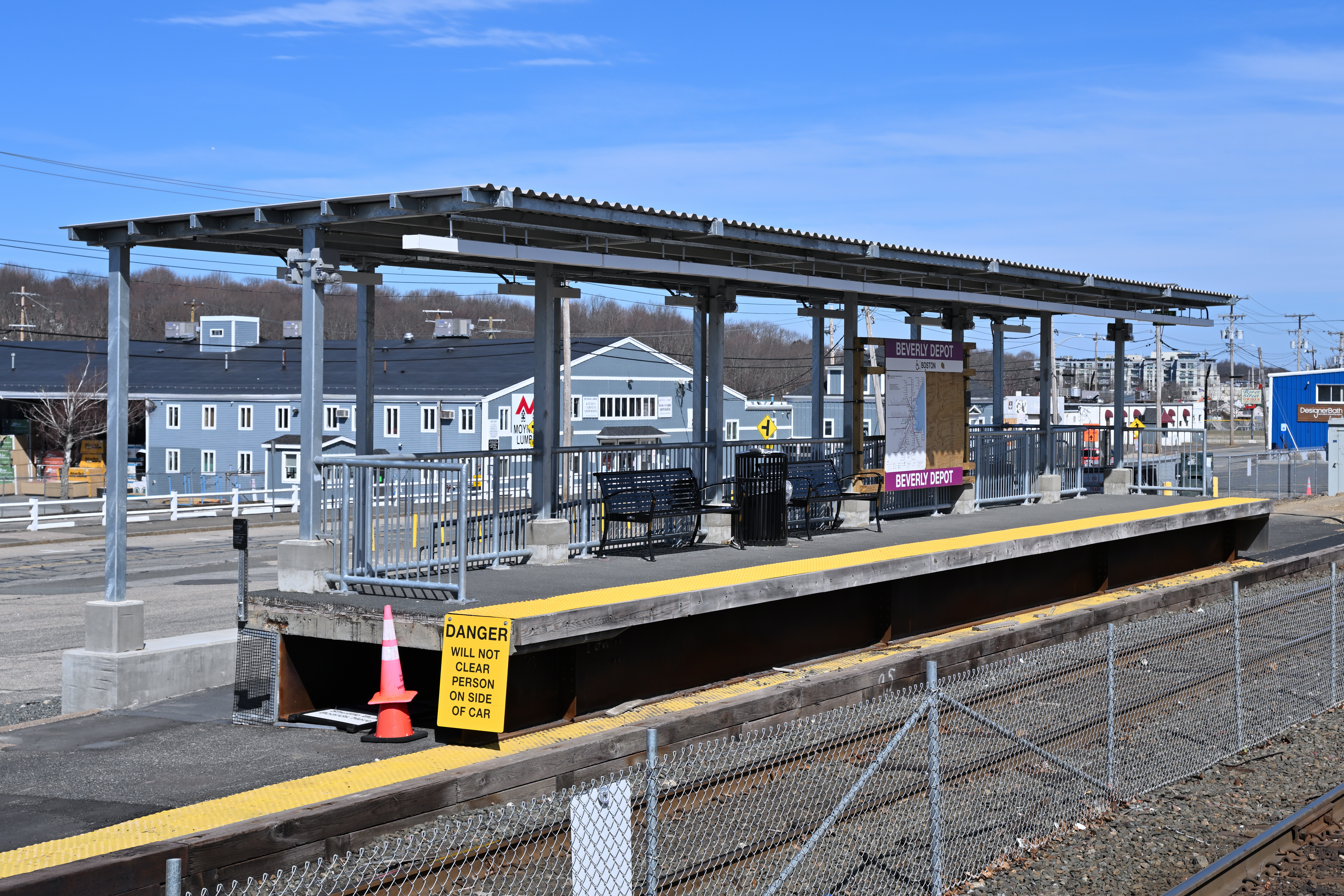
The inbound mini-high platform in 2025

In 2017, a private developer paid the MBTA $821,400 to lease the development rights at the garage. A mixed-use development with 67 residential units and ground-floor commercial space was completed next to the garage in 2018–19. The developer leases 70 spaces in the garage from the MBTA. In February 2023, the developer proposed a three-story, 70-unit residential building on top of the garage.

=== Accessibility improvements ===
Design work for improvements to the accessible mini-high platforms began in 2021. Because the existing mini-high platforms were "no longer salvageable" by 2023, the MBTA used the station as the first test site for a freestanding temporary accessible platform design. If successful, the design would then be used for interim accessibility at other stations. Construction of the test platforms began in March 2024 and was completed midyear.
