= Rockport station =

Commuter rail station in Rockport, Massachusetts

Rockport
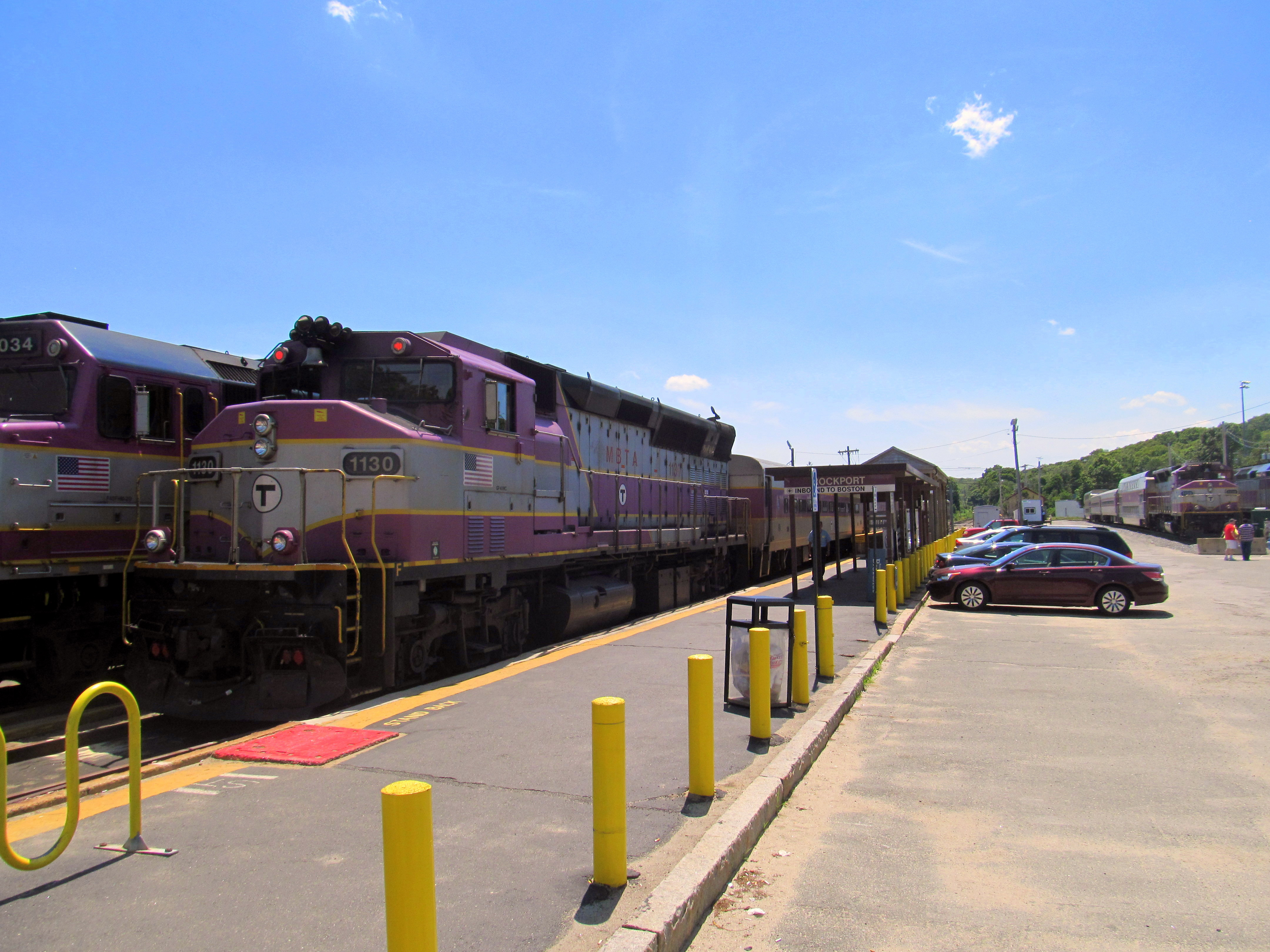
- A train at Rockport station in July 2016

General information
- Location: 17 Railroad Avenue; Rockport, Massachusetts
- Coordinates: 42.6559°N 70.6267°W
- Line: Gloucester Branch
- Platforms: 1 side platform
- Tracks: 6 (1 station, 4 layups, 1 auxiliary)
- Connections: CATA: 3, 9, 10 (seasonal)

Construction
- Parking: 88 spaces (free)
- Cycle facilities: 7 spaces
- Accessible: Yes

Other information
- Fare zone: 8

Passengers
- 2024: 140 daily boardings

Services
Preceding station	MBTA	Following station
Gloucester toward North Station	Newburyport/Rockport Line	Terminus
Location

Rockport station is an MBTA Commuter Rail station in Rockport, Massachusetts. It is the terminus of the Rockport branch of the Newburyport/Rockport Line. The station complex consists of a single side platform with one revenue track plus 4 layover tracks for parked trains and a short stretch of auxiliary track.

== History ==
=== Eastern Railroad and B&M ===
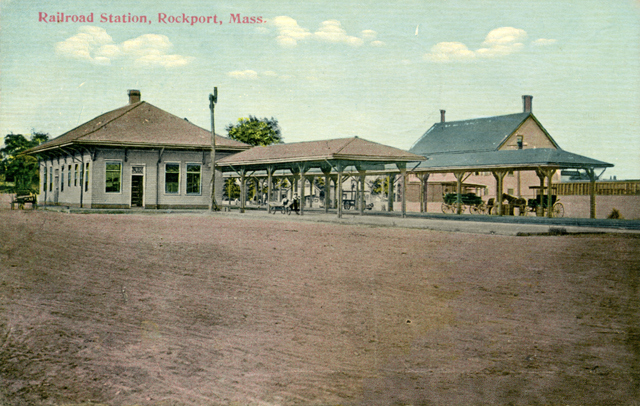
Circa-1911 postcard of the former station building at Rockport

Rockport was opened as the terminus of the Rockport Railroad (an independent extension of the Eastern Railroad's Gloucester Branch) in November 1861. The only loop on the entire Boston & Maine system was built at Rockport in the early 1900s, just west of the station around what is now Loop Pond. Although most trains did not need to be turned, private and parlor cars run in the summer months needed to be reversed before the return trip. Double-ended Budd RDC railcars took over service in 1955, though the loop was in regular use until 1962. The loop tracks were removed in 1965. An unpaved trail, connected to Tarrs Lane and Applecart Road, now follows the path of the loop.

Initially, Rockport trains were operated by the Eastern Railroad and met Eastern mainline trains at Beverly. In 1864, trains began to be through-routed to Boston to increase frequencies on the inner part of the trunk line. The Eastern bought the branch in 1868; by the 1870s, regular commuter service was available. The Eastern was leased by the Boston and Maine Railroad in 1885 and merged into it in 1890. Rockport service continued in the same fashion for decades, with 13 inbound round trips in 1906, 14 trips in 1950, and 11 trips in 1962.

The former station building is no longer extant, having been torn down around the 1950s. However, the original freight house, built between 1861 and 1884, is still in place east of the layover yard. It has long been used for storage by an animal feeds dealer, but may be rehabilitated for MBTA office and storage use.

=== MBTA era ===
Rockport has seen almost continuous service for over 150 years. When the newly formed MBTA began funding commuter rail service in 1965, communities outside the funding district were left to pay for trains to continue stopping. Rockport and neighboring Gloucester initially declined to subsidize service. Service past Manchester was discontinued on January 28, 1965, along with the outer sections of the Fitchburg Line and Central Mass Branch. service was to resume on June 6. After a lawsuit in which the Eastern Massachusetts Street Railway challenged the right of the MBTA to provide out-of-district service, Rockport service resumed on June 28, 1965. The MBTA bought most B&M commuter assets, including the Gloucester Branch, on December 27, 1976. The old yard at Rockport was upgraded to serve newer equipment in 1979.

On November 16, 1984, the Beverly Draw bridge connecting Salem to Beverly burned, cutting the Rockport Branch and the Ipswich Line from the rest of the system. (All lines running north and west of Newburyport were abandoned by 1984, leaving no route to move equipment to the rest of the northside.) A shuttle train was run from Rockport to Beverly until January 7, 1985, when it was replaced by bus service. The locomotives used were then trucked to Danvers so they could be repaired at the MBTA's main maintenance facility. A new bridge opened on December 1, 1985, reconnecting Rockport to the larger system.

=== Modern improvements ===
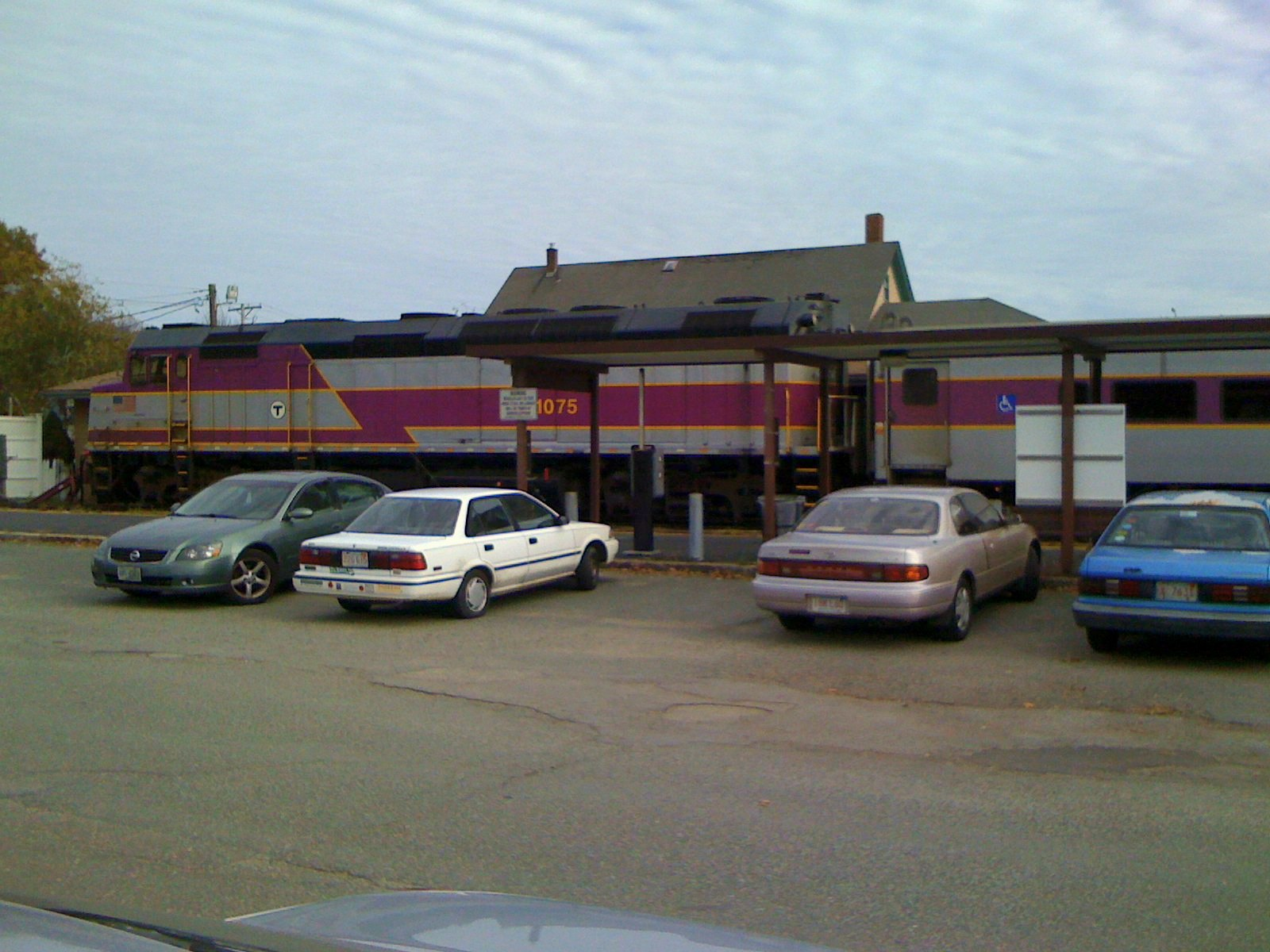
Commuters parked in the layover yard in 2008

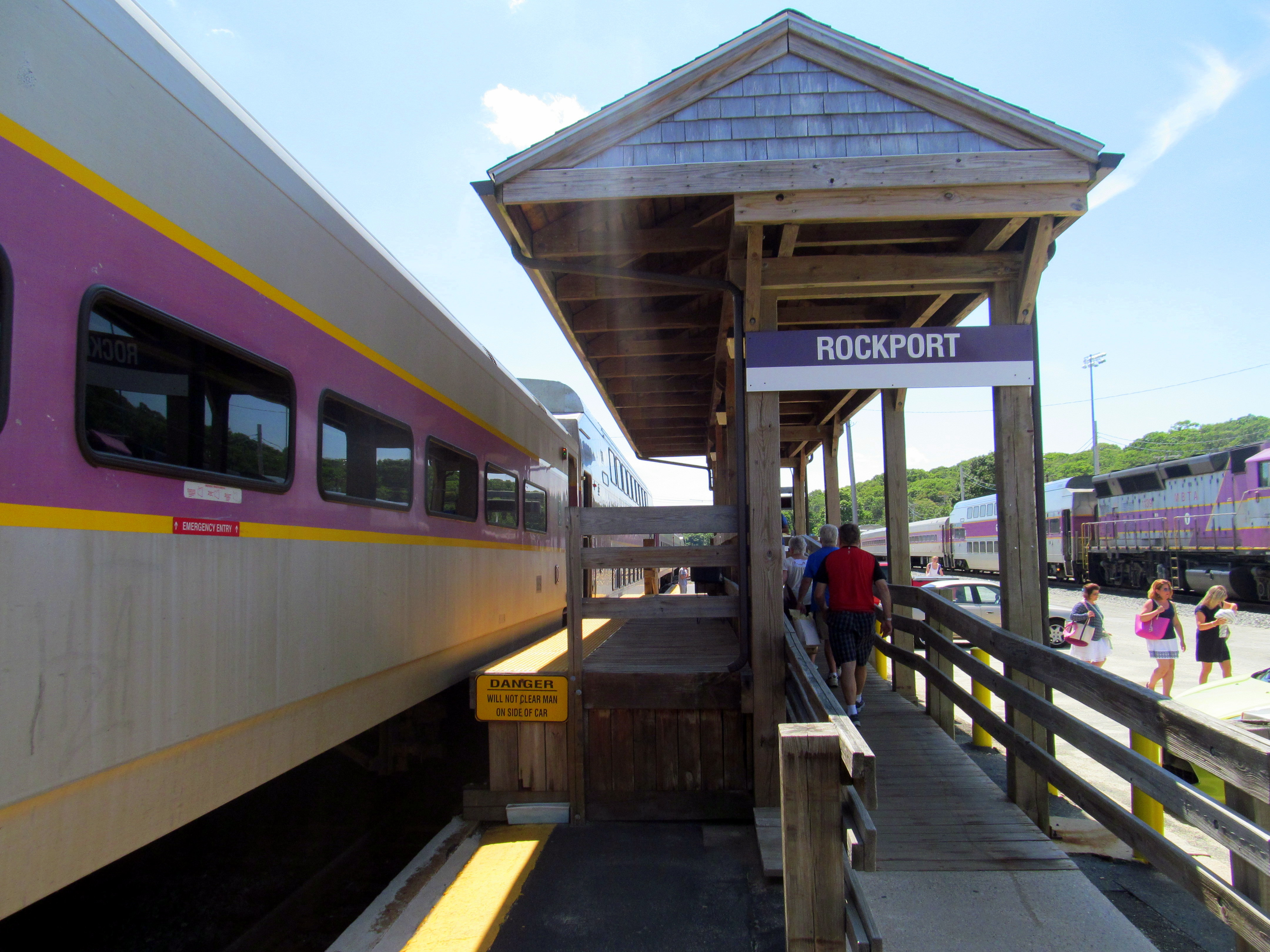
The 2006-opened mini-high platform in 2016

By the turn of the century, the station had a number of issues, many of which were unique to Rockport. The layover facility is located in a residential and commercial area, rather than a rural or industrial lot as with most other MBTA layovers. Power available at the layover was insufficient to run locomotives, so they are forced to idle their diesel motors for long periods, causing noise pollution for surrounding properties. Due to inadequate parking facilities, commuters and patrons of nearby businesses often parked inside the layover yard. Flooding after rain due to inadequate drainage further reduced available parking. Pooles Lane, a minor local road, cuts through the facility at an unprotected crossing, which limits the length of trains that can be stored, interferes with operations, and creates frequently unsafe conditions.

In 1999, the MBTA set a number of goals for improving Rockport station, which was largely unmodified since 1979. These included:

- Double parking capacity to 175 spaces, with associated pavement, drainage, lighting, safety, and aesthetic improvements
- Building a fully accessible platform long enough for 9-car trains
- Providing layover space for four 9-car trains, with the ability to handle trains with two locomotives

However, due to the construction of the Greenbush Line and four infill stations on the Framingham/Worcester Line, funds were not immediately available to implement these goals. In 2006, as an interim solution, the MBTA built a mini-high platform to make the station accessible. The $70,000 platform took ten weeks to construct and opened on June 28, 2006.

In 2007, the MBTA completed an alternatives analysis of the layover facility. Several alternatives involved improvements to the existing site, while others looked at moving to a completely new yard at Piggery Crossing on Eastern Avenue (near the old Bass Rocks station site). All would have closed the Pooles Lane crossing and created a new street entrance and larger parking lot in the existing layover yard space. The Piggery Crossing layover alternatives minimized land-taking at the station area, but were more expensive and impacted a designated town historic space. In 2008, the MBTA began planning to implement Alternative A1, which would have created a modernized 4-track layover facility at the station with an engine shed to minimize noise from locomotives. The project was to be completed in 2011. The agency awarded a $1.2 million design contract in June 2008. However, after several years of delays, the improvements were tacitly canceled by the MBTA due to disagreements between the town and the MBTA over the project scope and funding.

In June 2013, the MBTA released plans for a less ambitious improvements project. Ground power for locomotives would be upgraded from 175 and 200 amps to 600 amps to eliminate long-term idling, while a bus shelter and information kiosk would be installed for use by the Cape Ann Transportation Authority. The then-$2.8 million project was to be partially funded by $1.2 million in federal earmarks obtained during the previous project planning phase, without need for local monies. The MBTA originally planned to advertise for bids by the end of 2013 and complete the project in late 2014.

However, design completion was delayed to January 2014 due to the need to place a substation inside, rather than guarded by a fence, and then to October 2014 by other matters. Although the project did not include an engine shed, new platform, or parking lot improvements, it was specifically designed not to preclude them and the MBTA can add those elements later if funding becomes available. Construction of the $5 million project took place in 2017 and 2018. Along with the electrical upgrade, it included paving of the parking lot and access road, installation of a tactile strip on the platform edge, and CATA signage.

On April 29, 2020, service between West Gloucester and Rockport was indefinitely replaced by buses due to a failure of the old bridge. That June, the MBTA indicated the closure would continue until the completion of the bridge replacement. Regular service to Rockport over the bridge resumed on May 23, 2022.
