= Cape Ann Transportation Authority =

Bus operator in Massachusetts, United States

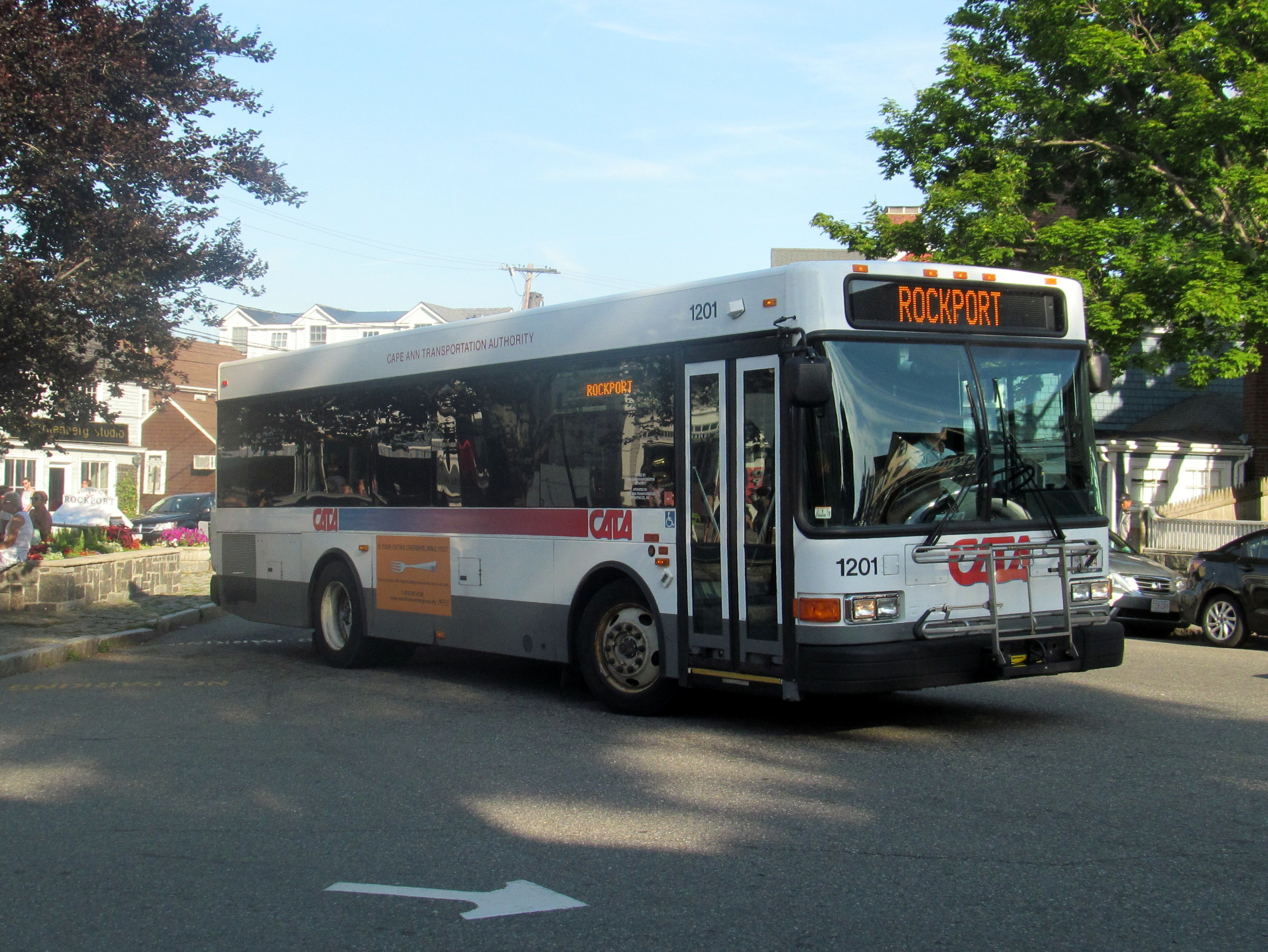
- A CATA bus in Rockport in July 2016
- Founded: 1976
- Headquarters: 3 Rear Pond Road
- Locale: Gloucester, Massachusetts
- Service area: Cape Ann
- Service type: bus service
- Routes: 12
- Hubs: Gloucester, Rockport
- Fleet: Gillig, Ford 450/350, Ram ProMaster 3500.
- Daily ridership: Avg 1,000
- Fuel type: Gasoline, Diesel
- Operator: Cape Ann Transportation Operating Company
- Administrator: Felicia Webb
- Website: canntran.com

The Cape Ann Transportation Authority (CATA) is a public, non-profit organization in Massachusetts, charged with providing public transportation to the Cape Ann area, consisting of the city of Gloucester and the nearby towns of Essex, Ipswich, Manchester-by-the-Sea, Rockport and Hamilton.

== Routes ==
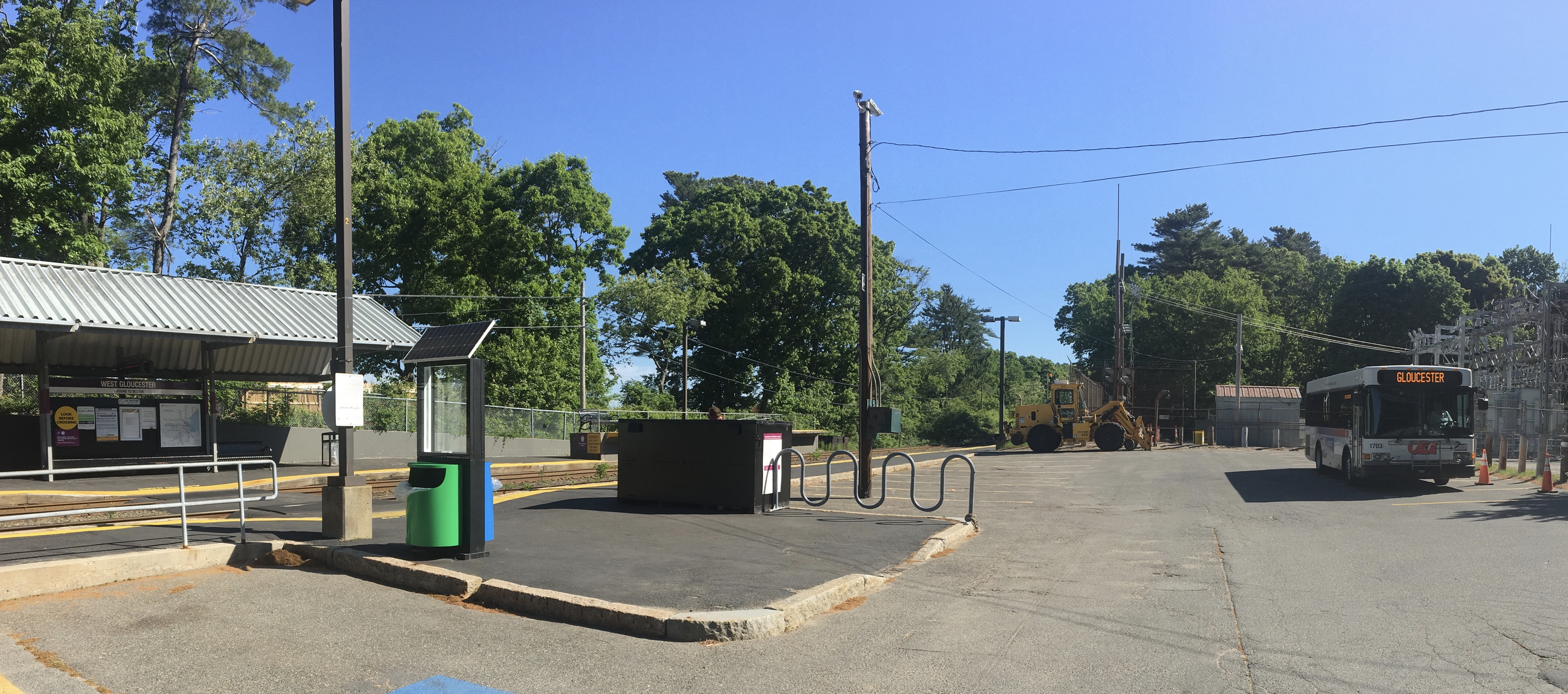
A CATA bus at West Gloucester station

As of July 2026, CATA operates nine year-round routes (1–9) and three seasonal routes (10–12):

- Route 1: Gloucester – Rockport via Eastern Avenue
- Route 2: Gloucester Crossing/Business Express
- Route 2A: Gloucester Crossing/Blackburn Express
- Route 3: Lanesville
- Route 4: Gloucester – Rockport via Thatcher Road
- Route 5: Gloucester – West Gloucester – Essex
- Route 6: Magnolia
- Route 7: Saturday Mall Shuttle
- Route 9: Beverly Commuter Bus operates Monday to Friday with 2 trips per day one in the morning and one in the afternoon
- Route 10: Rockport Shuttle
- Route 11: Stage Fort Park Shuttle
- Route 12: Ipswich–Essex Explorer

CATA also operates microtransit service within Gloucester and Rockport, as well as paratransit service.

== Fleet ==
CATA operates a diverse set of vehicles on its routes. Its full-size bus fleet includes 16 Gillig Low Floor buses, while its mini bus fleet is made up of Ford E-Series vehicles, including 12 Ford Cutaways, 5 Ford E450s, 7 New England RAM Low Floor and 3 Karsan E-Jets Electric Bus.
