= Joshua Webster =

American businessman and railroad executive (1797–1871)

Joshua Webster (August 17, 1795 – January 7, 1871) was an American businessman and railroad executive who served as the first president of the Saugus Branch Railroad.

== Family ==
Webster was born on August 17, 1795, at his family farm in the West Parish of Haverhill, Massachusetts. On November 24, 1820, he married Elizabeth Bartlett Chase in Haverhill. The couple had their first son, Henry, on August 10, 1821. Their second son, William Wallace, was born on January 7, 1824. In 1825, the family moved to Boston. On August 22, 1829, the Websters' daughter, Salome Ann, was born. Another son, Joshua Berman Webster, was born on September 21, 1838.

== Business career ==
Webster sold clothing and shoe trimmings in Boston with the firm of Webster, Kimball & Co. In 1837, Webster became a director of Kilby Bank of Boston. He was also a director of the India Insurance Company. While in Boston, Webster became a prominent social figure and was active in politics as a member of the Whig and Republican parties. While a member of the Whig Party, he was close acquaintance of Henry Clay and Daniel Webster. In 1847, Webster left his firm and moved to Lynn, Massachusetts, where he had purchased 150 acres of land and a residence.

=== Saugus Branch Railroad ===
In 1846, Webster proposed a railroad from East Saugus to Malden, Massachusetts, that would connect with the Boston & Maine Railroad. In 1847, the proposal was presented to the Massachusetts General Court. In 1847, Webster purchased 200 acres in Malden along the projected route of the Saugus Branch. Here, he planned a residential development with wide streets and hundreds of ornamental maple trees. The neighborhood would become known as Maplewood due to the trees planted by Webster. In spring of 1848 the General Court approved Webster's plan and the Saugus Branch Railroad Co. was organized. Webster was chosen to serve as the company's president. In 1849, the railroad's charter was amended to change the route so that it ran through Sweester's Corner in Saugus and Linden in Malden. Sweester's Corner would later become known as Cliftondale after Webster suggested the name to Daniel P. Wise, who planning a residential development there. In 1850 the railroad's charter was further amended so that the line extended from East Saugus to Lynn Common in Lynn, Massachusetts. By July 1851, the future of the railroad was in doubt when Edward Crane, offered to purchase all of the remaining shares. However, a month later, it was learned that the Eastern Railroad, Boston & Maine's largest competitor, had purchased all of Crane's shares, perhaps in an effort to stop the project. Nevertheless, Webster and his associates were able to continue the project. That November contracts were given out for its construction and in February 1852 ground was broken at Pearson's Neck in Saugus.

On April 30, 1852, the Eastern Railroad Co. purchased all the rights of the Saugus Branch and assumed its operations. That October, Gardiner Greene Hubbard was chosen to replace Webster as president, but Webster remained on as a director. On February 1, 1853, the Saugus Branch opened for passengers. In 1855, the Saugus Branch Railroad Co. was consolidated into the Eastern Railroad Co.

== Later life and death ==
By 1858, Webster and his wife were residing Maplewood. On January 7, 1871, Webster died of pneumonia in Stockton, California, where he was visiting an agricultural implement warehouse he owned.
