= Great Revere train wreck of 1871 =

1871 railroad accident in Massachusetts

Coordinates: 42°24′19.85″N 71°0′13.28″W

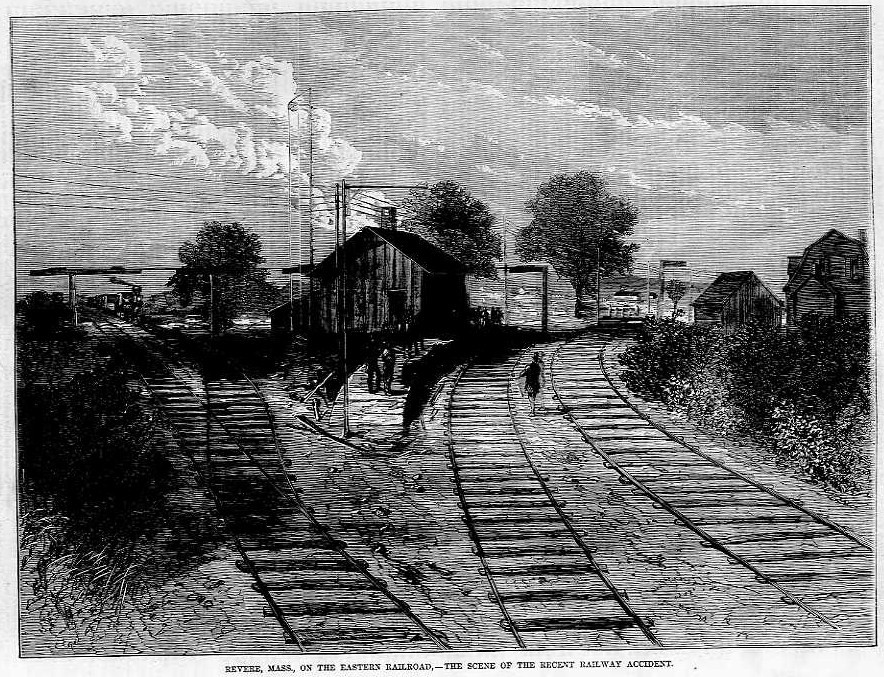
- Woodcut of the Revere station, made shortly after the accident, looking towards Boston. The two lines on the right are the double track main line, and the line on the left is the branch to East Boston.

Details
- Date: August 26, 1871
- Location: Revere, Massachusetts
- Country: United States
- Line: Saugus Branch
- Operator: Eastern Railroad
- Incident type: Rear-end collision and ensuing fire
- Cause: Insufficient spacing between trains

Statistics
- Trains: 2
- Deaths: 29–32
- Injured: 29

The Great Revere train wreck of 1871 occurred on the evening of August 26, 1871, when the Eastern Railroad's Portland Express slammed into the rear of a stopped local train at Revere, Massachusetts.

== Background ==
The accident occurred on a very busy Saturday evening with three large weekend events taking place outside Boston causing heavier than usual traffic on the railroads, especially on the Eastern Railroad's line. Normally, the Eastern ran 152 trains on weekend days, but with two large revival meetings and military muster taking place, the number of trains running to accommodate the extra load of passengers was increased to 192.

The heavy traffic and the Eastern's management's conservative style of not using the telegraph to dispatch trains, led to long delays along the line.

== Accident ==
The following description of the accident is based on that of the official report of the Massachusetts Railroad Commission, with additional detail from additional sources.

Four trains were scheduled to depart from the Boston terminus after 6:30 pm: a Saugus branch line train at 6:30 pm; a second Saugus branch train at 7:00 pm; a Beverly accommodation train (which stopped all stations) at 7:15 pm; and the Portland Express at 8:00 pm. Due to the dislocation of services, all four trains departed late: the first Saugus train around 7 pm; the Beverly accommodation at 7:40 pm; the second Saugus train at 7:53 pm and the Express at 8:05 pm. The second Saugus train departed after the Beverly accommodation due to difficulty in getting a train crew.

The single-track Saugus branch line left the main line at Everett Junction, just north of the Mystic River. When the first Saugus branch train arrived at Everett Junction, it could not proceed any further as an inbound branch line train was due and there was a specific rule prohibiting an outbound train from entering the branch when an inbound train was due. At this time, the inbound branch train had not even departed from the other end of the branch at Lynn. It had written instructions to wait to connect with an extra (special train) coming from the Ashbury Grove revival meeting. The extra, however, was very late as it had earlier broken a coupling between the carriages. The inbound Saugus branch train eventually departed Lynn at 7:30 pm and arrived at Everett Junction at 8:10 pm.

By this time, a queue of trains had built up at Everett Junction on the outbound line: the first Saugus branch train; a light locomotive for Salem; the Beverly accommodation; and the second Saugus branch train. Normally, blockages at Everett Junction due to an outbound Saugus branch train waiting for an inbound train were avoided by the employee stationed there shunting the outbound train on to the branch or the inbound main line under flag protection. However, the regular employee was sick and his replacement simply left the trains on the main line.

With the arrival of the inbound Saugus branch train, the outbound Saugus branch train could finally clear the main line. This allowed the Beverly accommodation to depart on the main line (the light engine had been coupled to the accommodation). While this was happening, the Portland Express arrived at Everett Junction and was stopped behind the second Saugus branch train. Once the second branch train had cleared the main line, the Portland Express was allowed to depart.

At this point, there was considerable confusion on the part of the conductor of the Beverly accommodation and the engineer of the Portland Express as to the location and identity of each other's train.

The conductor of the Beverly accommodation had been reluctant to leave Boston so close in advance of the Portland Express, but had been reassured by the superintendent that the engineer of the express would be warned that the Beverly accommodation was running late. The conductor was under the impression that the train behind him in the queue at Everett Junction was the Portland Express, and hence believed that the engineer would be well aware that the Beverly accommodation was running immediately in advance of him.

The engineer of the express had, indeed, been verbally warned at Boston by the depot master "to look out for other trains". Upon being stopped at Everett Junction behind the second Saugus branch train, the engineer assumed this was the train he had been warned about and thought the line in front of him was clear.

The two trains, the Beverly accommodation and the Portland Express, departed Everett Junction not more than five minutes apart. At Chelsea, the station agent noted that the trains were unusually close together, but failed to warn the engineer of the express as he felt the two train crews would be aware of the location of the other train. On the straight approaching Revere, a passenger on the rear platform of the accommodation could see the headlight of the express behind him, but mist and the poor tail lamps meant that it was not possible for the engineer of the express to see the rear of the Beverly accommodation. Approaching Revere, the attention of the engineer of the express was focused upwards, on a signal that would inform him whether the switches were set for the East Boston branch, not along the track.

The two train crews became aware of the other train when they were about 800 yards (730 m) apart. The engineer of the express whistled for brakes (neither of the trains was fitted with continuous brakes), reversed his engine, and jumped clear. The warning time was so short, however, that only two brakes on the express could be applied by the train crew. The express had slowed to 10 miles per hour (16 km/h) on impact, but even this low speed was sufficient to cause significant damage to the Beverly accommodation. The express train's engine telescoped about two-thirds of its length into the rear passenger car. The impact knocked fittings off the boiler, allowing live steam to fill the remains of the carriage. The carriage then took fire from split kerosene (from the lanterns) and firebox of the locomotive. The official report states that 29 people were killed, all in the rear car, and 57 were injured in the train. Some passengers that were trapped in the splintered rear coaches were burned alive. Bystanders from the station and surviving passengers attempted to rescue trapped victims by tearing parts of the roof off the coaches, but their effort was unsuccessful as fire quickly engulfed the shattered timbers.

== Aftermath ==
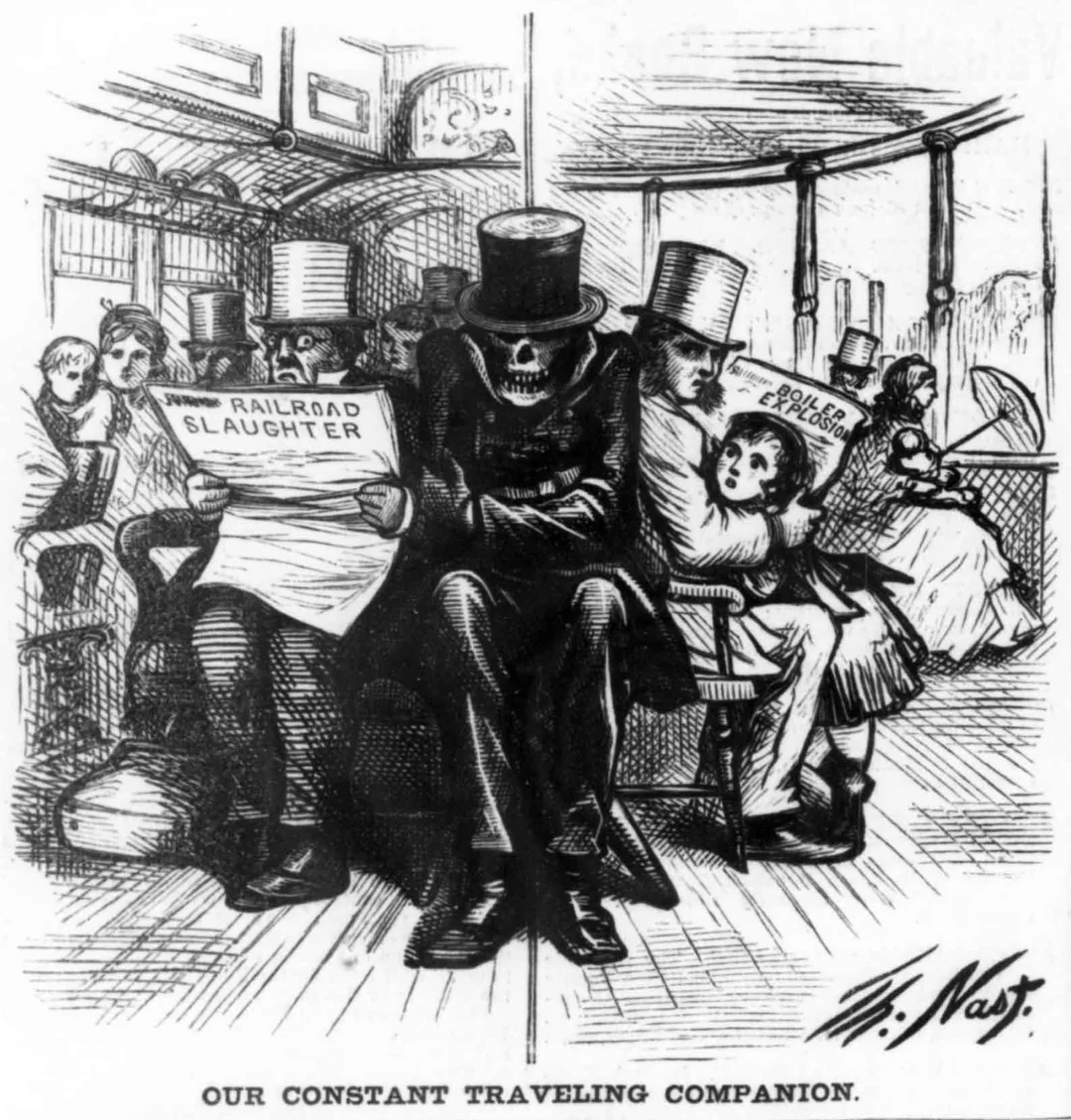
After the train wreck in Revere, Massachusetts, Thomas Nast drew this cartoon of the "Our Constant Traveling Companion" aka Grim Reaper 16 September 1871 due to the frequent occurrence of fatal railroad and steamboat accidents

After the accident, attorney Wendell Phillips reportedly accused the Eastern Railroad of "deliberate murder".

The railroad was condemned by the public for their conservative management, old fashioned equipment, not having the Westinghouse air brakes on their locomotives and their insistence on using the old time-interval system and not using the telegraph. Several lawsuits were filed against the Eastern and the company almost went bankrupt-costing the Company $510,600.00This eventually led to the Eastern being merged with its rival, the Boston and Maine Railroad, in 1884.

== See also ==
- List of disasters in Massachusetts by death toll
