= Lynn station =

MBTA rail station in Lynn, Massachusetts, US

Central Square – Lynn
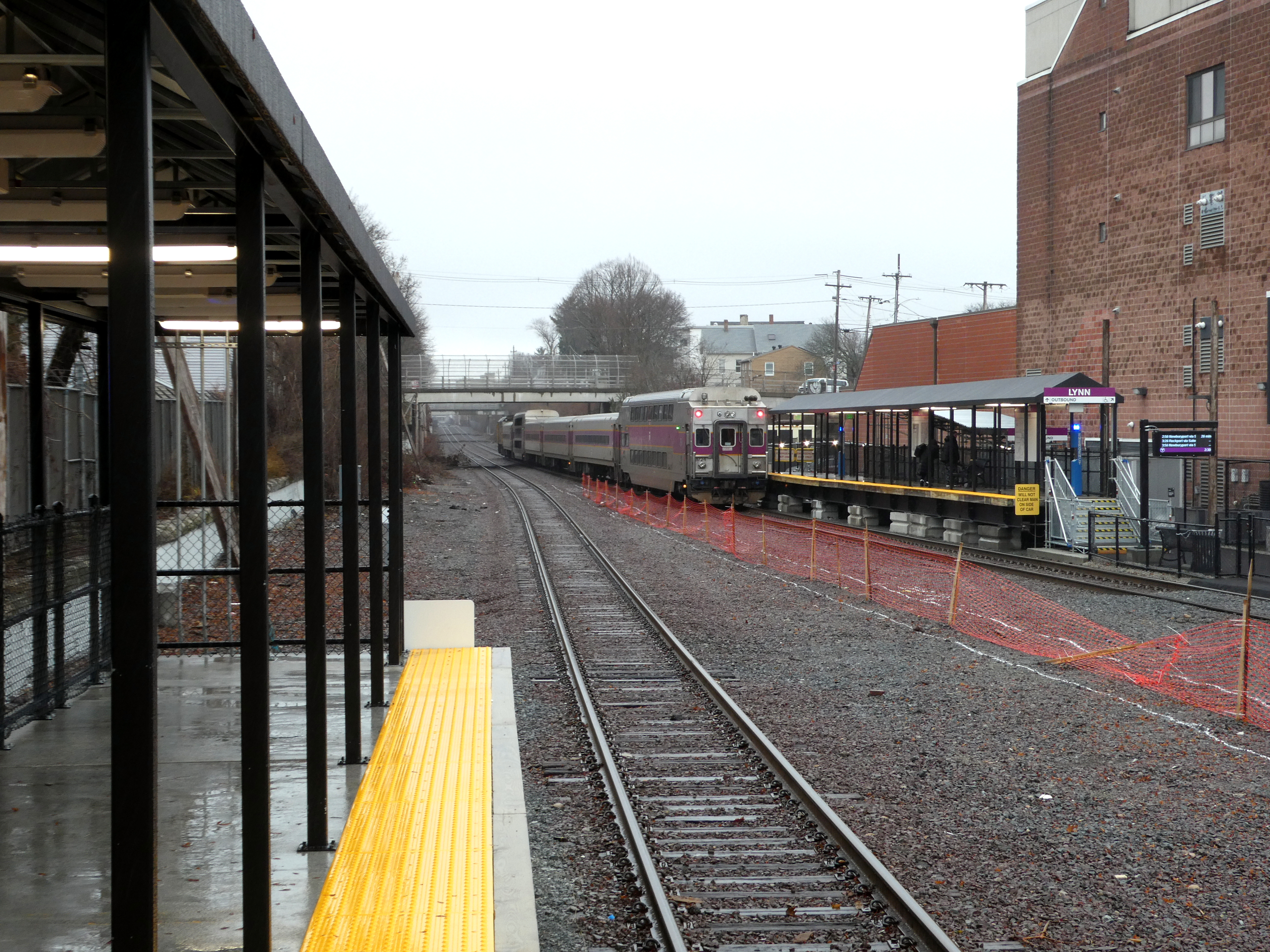
- The interim Lynn station in December 2023

General information
- Location: Lynn, Massachusetts
- Coordinates: 42.46522°N 70.94067°W
- Line: Eastern Route
- Platforms: 1 island platform
- Tracks: 2
- Connections: MBTA bus: 426, 426W, 429, 435, 436, 439, 441, 442, 455, 456

Construction
- Cycle facilities: 14 spaces
- Accessible: Yes

Other information
- Fare zone: 2

History
- Opened: 1838
- Rebuilt: 1848, 1872, 1895, 1909–1914, 1952, 1991–1992, 2023

Passengers
- 2024: 470 daily boardings

Services
Preceding station	MBTA	Following station
River Works toward North Station	Newburyport/Rockport Line	Swampscott toward Newburyport or Rockport
Proposed services
Preceding station	MBTA	Following station
River Works toward Charles/MGH	Blue Line	Terminus
Location

Lynn station (signed as Central Square–Lynn) is an intermodal transit station in downtown Lynn, Massachusetts. It is a station on the MBTA Commuter Rail Newburyport/Rockport Line and a hub for the MBTA bus system.

Service on the Eastern Railroad through Lynn began on August 27, 1838. The original wooden station was replaced by a larger structure in 1848, and the Saugus Branch began serving Lynn in 1855. In the "Great Lynn Depot War", a local disagreement in 1865 about where to place a replacement station became a major court case. It ended in 1872 with the construction of stations at two closely spaced sites, though one was soon torn down. The other station burned in 1889; it was replaced in 1895 by a depot with a large clock tower.

The Boston and Maine Railroad (B&M), which had acquired the Eastern in 1883, began a grade separation project through Lynn in 1909 – part of an attempt to quadruple-track the whole line. Completed in 1914, it expanded the station to four tracks and two island platforms, with the 1895-built structure modified "not for the better". It was replaced in 1952 by a modernist brick structure. Saugus Branch service ended in 1958; service on the mainline was subsidized beginning in 1965 by the Massachusetts Bay Transportation Authority (MBTA).

The MBTA opened a new accessible island platform in 1992, along with a large parking garage that anticipated a never-realized extension of the Blue Line. In 2003, the bus routes were moved to a busway adjacent to the garage. The rail station and parking garage temporarily closed on October 1, 2022, pending a reconstruction project, while the busway remained open. Interim platforms nearby opened in December 2023.

== History ==
=== Early history ===
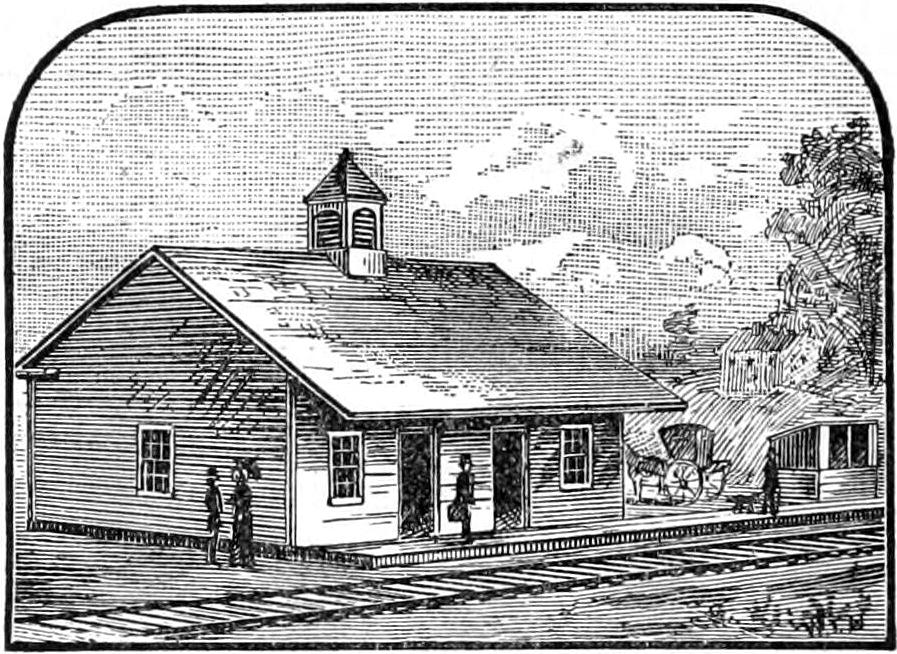
Early image of the 1838 station

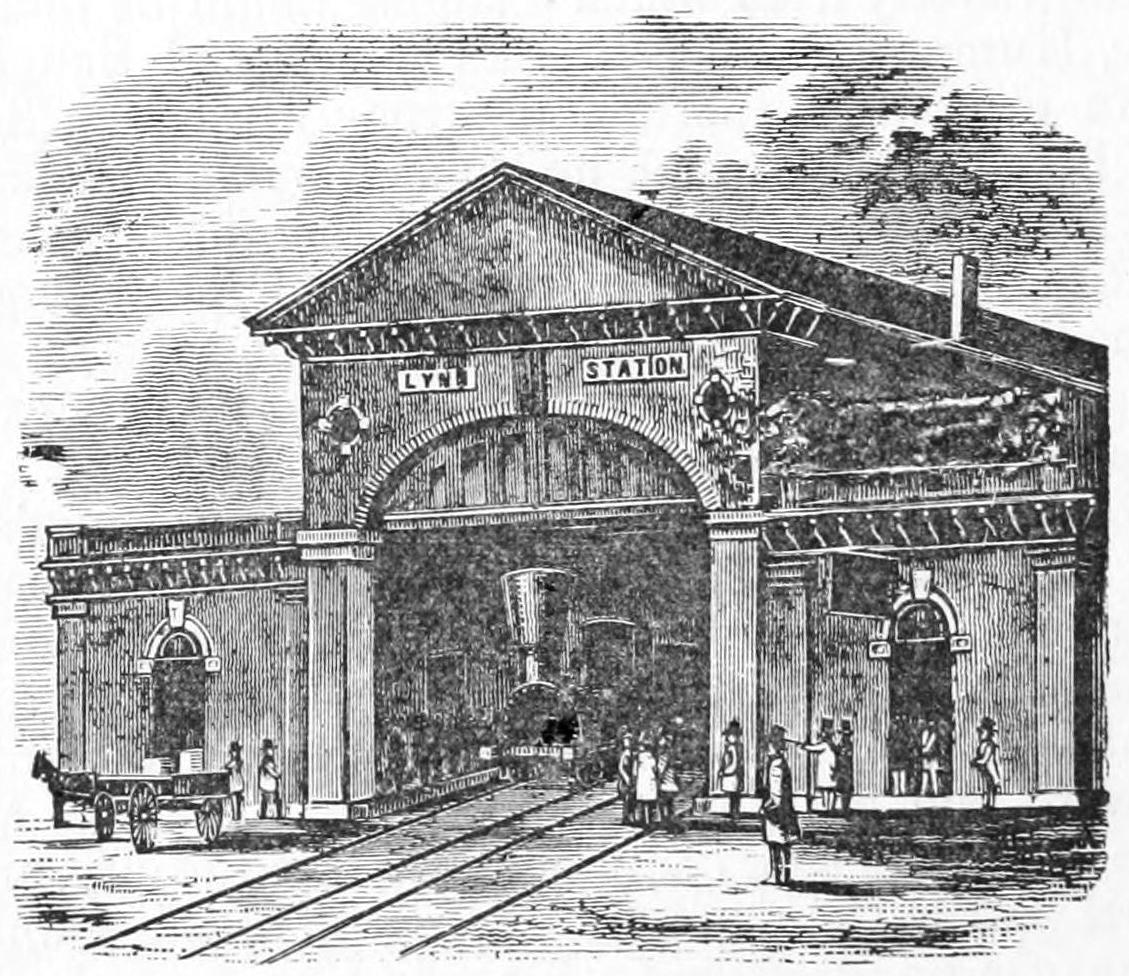
Woodcutting of the 1848 station

After the railroads from Boston to Lowell, Worcester, and Providence were chartered in 1830 and 1831, railroads to other surrounding cities including Newburyport and Portsmouth were proposed. The Eastern Railroad was chartered on April 14, 1836. Work began at East Boston in late 1836; it reached Lynn in the spring of 1837, but construction was slowed by the Panic of 1837 and did not reach Salem until 1838. Service from Salem to East Boston began on August 27, 1838, with fares half that of competing stagecoaches.

The line through Lynn was built at surface level. A number of stations have served Lynn, including a series of stations near the current location at Central Square as well as a number of other stations around the city. The first depot at the Central Square location, built in 1838, was a small wooden building.

The station was the site of an early protest against the discrimination of African-Americans in transportation. On September 29, 1841, noted abolitionist Frederick Douglass and friend James N. Buffum (later mayor of Lynn) were thrown from an Eastern Railroad train when Douglass refused to sit in the segregated train coach. Trains were ordered to not stop at Lynn for several days out of concern that the citizens of Lynn would cause additional incidents.

On June 16, 1846, the stockholders authorized the sale of $450,000 of new stock to fund various branch lines plus new depots at Salem and Lynn. The 1838-built station was replaced in 1848 by a brick building with a 2-track train shed, modeled after the 1847-built station at Salem but smaller and lacking towers.

In 1845 and 1846, a line from Malden to Salem via Saugus and Lynnfield was proposed but did not pass the legislature due to bitter objections from the Eastern. Instead, the Saugus Branch Railroad opened from Malden to Lynn Common on February 1, 1853. Affiliated with the Eastern's primary rival, the Boston and Maine Railroad (B&M), it did not initially have a connection with the Eastern. In 1855, the Eastern acquired the majority stock of the Saugus Branch Railroad to keep it away from the B&M. The connection to the B&M at Malden was severed, and it was connected to the Eastern at South Malden (Everett) and West Lynn. Lynn became the primary turnback point for the Saugus Branch after 1855, though a limited number of trains continued to Salem until World War I.

The first horsecars ran to Lynn in 1854 under the Lynn and Boston Railroad. Its line ran between its namesake cities; running through Charlestown on Chelsea Street, Chelsea and Revere on Broadway, then along the Salem Turnpike to Lynn. On November 19, 1888, the Highland Circuit route of the Lynn & Boston became the first electrified trolley line in Massachusetts.

=== Great Lynn Depot War ===
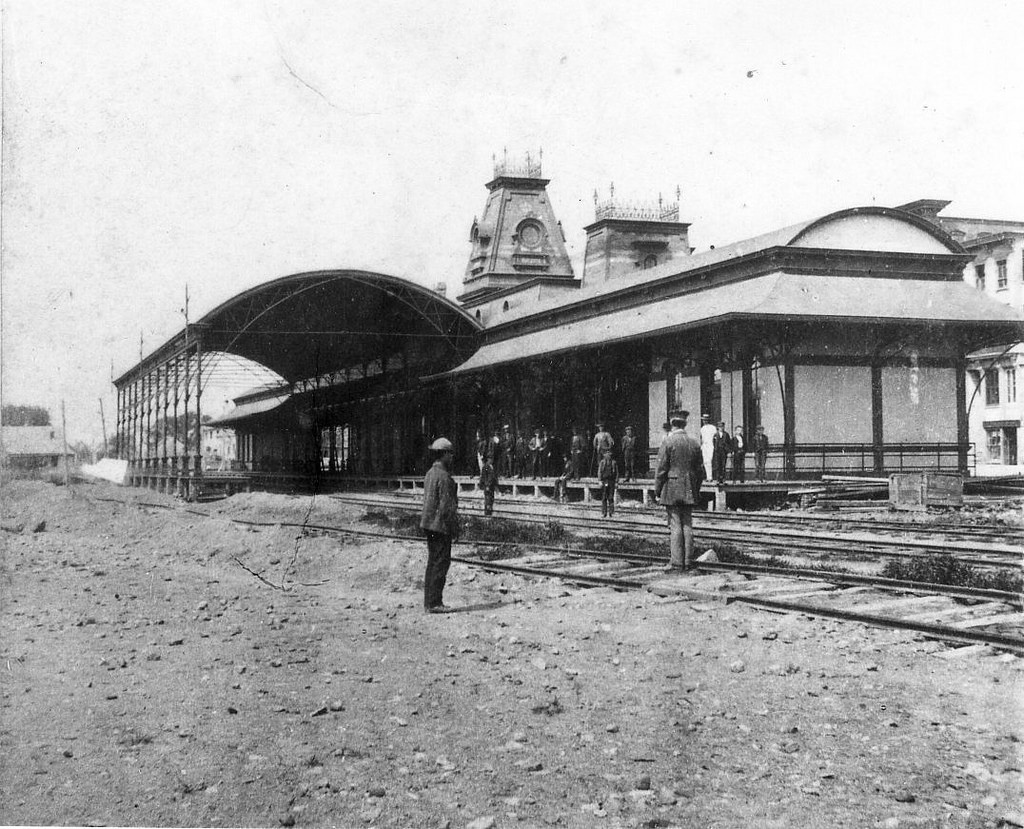
Market Street station under construction in 1872

When the Eastern Railroad prepared to build a new depot in 1865, a great deal of controversy erupted – an event later known as the "Great Lynn Depot War". One faction wanted the replacement station built at the same Central Square location, while another wanted it built at Knight's Crossing, a block southwest at Market Street. The Central Square faction was aided by a bill passed in the Massachusetts legislature on April 29, 1865, which disallowed a railroad from abandoning a station that had been in service more than five years, as well as an 1868 bill that specifically directed the Eastern Railroad to build the replacement station at Central Square.

After a case which reached the Supreme Court in 1871 and a subsequent appeal to the United States Court, a decision was ultimately made to construct stations at both locations. Both the Central Square and Market Street stations were in service by mid-1872, but it was untenable for the railroad to serve two stations just several hundred feet apart. The Market Street station was demolished in 1873 and replaced with a wooden shelter that served only a handful of trains.

The depot controversy was a setback for the Eastern Railroad in a city where residents were already dissatisfied with poor service. In 1872, the Boston, Revere Beach and Lynn Railroad (BRB&L) was charted as a direct competitor to the Eastern; service began from Market Street in 1875 and lasted until 1940. Service to East Boston had been replaced with direct service to Boston via the Grand Junction Railroad in 1854, but Lynn–East Boston service was run from 1872 to 1880 to compete with the BRB&L. In 1880, the service was cut to a Revere–East Boston shuttle, which lasted until 1905.

From approximately the 1850s to the 1930s, Lynn was the terminus for some short turn Boston commuter trains. From 1881 to 1892, some of these trains ran via the Chelsea Beach Branch during the summer.

=== Track elevation ===
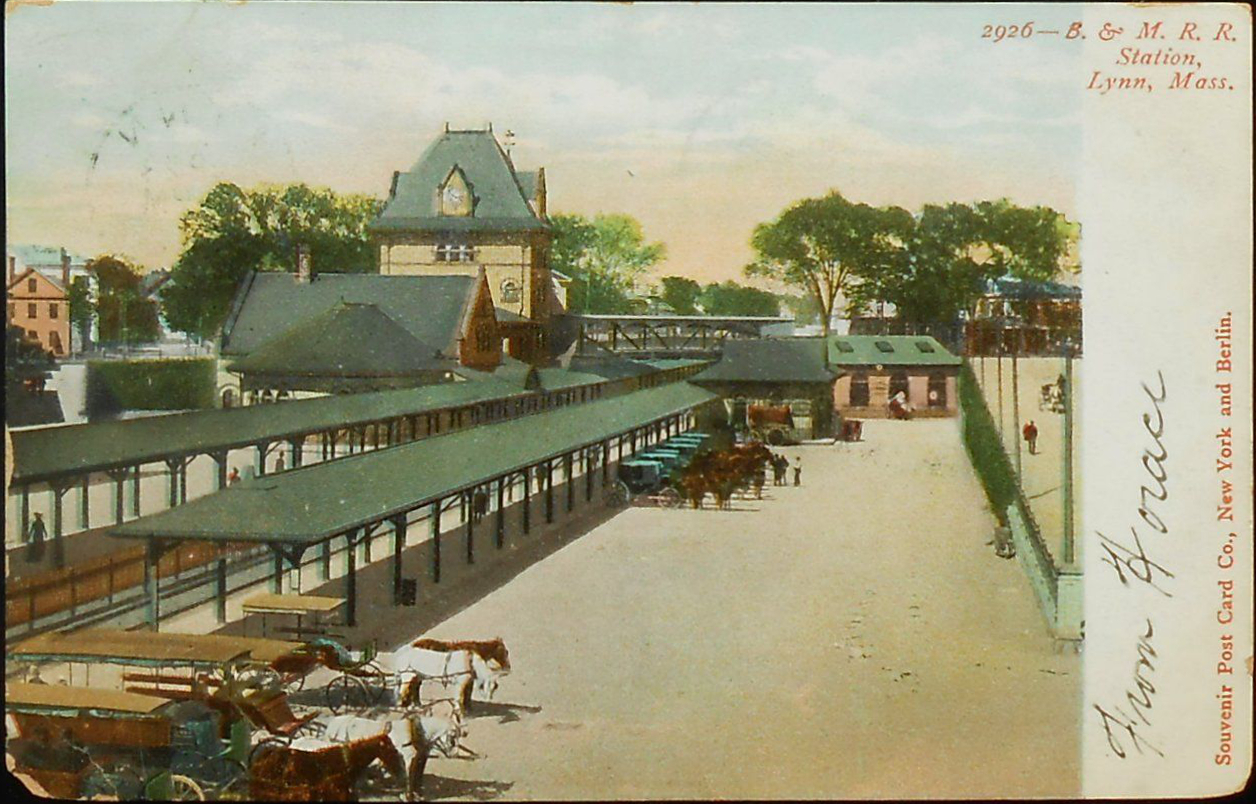
The 1895-built station before the 1910s grade separation project

The B&M acquired the Eastern Railroad in 1883. The 1872-built Central Square station was severely damaged in the Great Lynn Fire on November 26, 1889, which burned much of the downtown area. The B&M soon erected a temporary station at the site using part of the damaged station. Construction of a new station was delayed by real estate acquisition. Bradford Gilbert was consulted for the design of the new station in 1890; after modifications by railroad officials, an 1892 design featured a polygonal clock tower and a large train shed.

Construction of the new station ultimately began in early 1894. Designed by B&M architect Henry B. Fletcher, it was different from the earlier plans. The main building, measuring 53 by 150 feet (16 m × 46 m), was on the north side of the tracks west of Silsbee Street; a 25-by-105-foot (7.6 m × 32.0 m) eastbound station building was on the south side. They were built of buff brick and brownstone, with marble flooring and slate roofs. The two side platforms had 750-foot (230 m)-long wooden awnings with slate roofs. The main station building had a 70-foot (21 m)-tall square pyramidal clock tower. The new station buildings opened in March 1895 at a total cost exceeding $100,000 (equivalent to $3,400,000 in 2025); the old station was demolished soon after.

As early as 1901, the city began planning to eliminate the numerous grade crossings in downtown Lynn. With 150 trains per day on the main line and 40 on the Saugus Branch, some streets were blocked for as long as half of daylight hours. After legal issues, construction of an elevated viaduct began in September 1909. However, the New Haven Railroad briefly gained control of the Boston and Maine at this time, and intended to fully four-track the line through Lynn in conjunction with plans including a possible railroad tunnel under the harbor. The municipality initially intended to force the railroad to depress the four-track line below grade, but later reached an agreement with the railroad to modify the two-track viaduct for four tracks.

The New Haven's plan to four-track the line as far as the branch line splits in Salem and Beverly was stymied by the costs to modify the grade crossings in Chelsea and the single-track tunnel at Salem. Quadruple track became operational for two miles from the junction of the Saugus Branch at West Lynn Tower, through Lynn station (with two island platforms to serve trains on all tracks) to just before Swampscott station. The depot was modified "not for the better" in conjunction with the elevation project. Many of the four-track bridge spans in Lynn, no longer in operation, are still extant.

=== B&M era ===
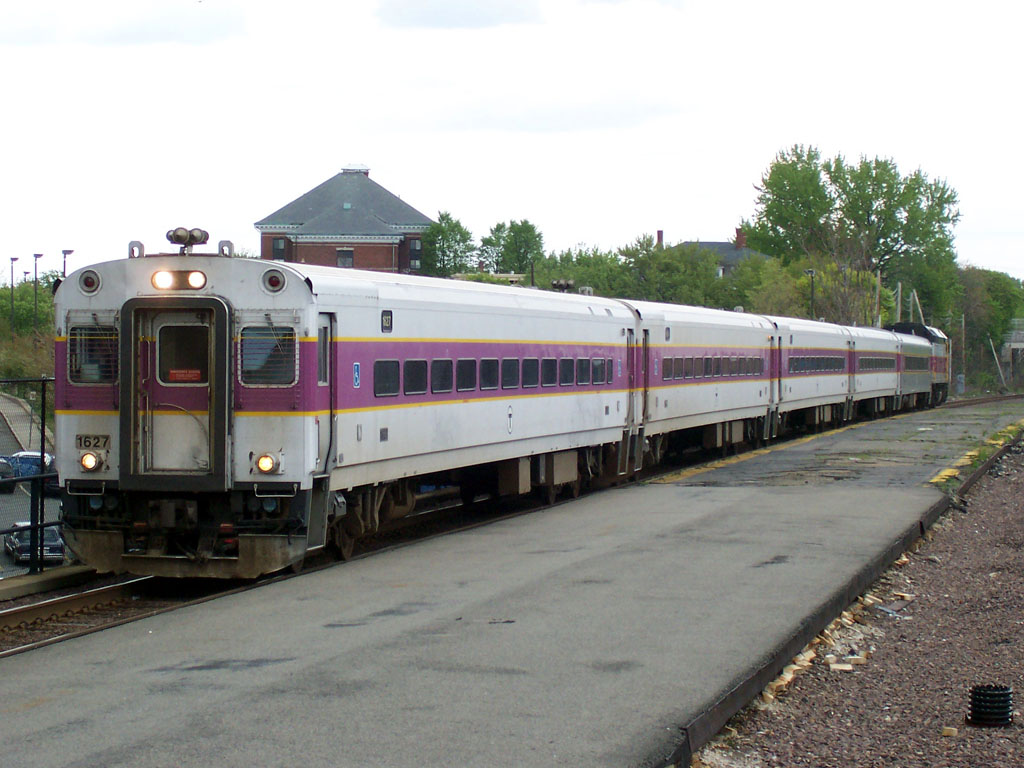
An MBTA train passes the 1914-built old inbound island platform

Streetcars service to Lynn continued under the Lynn & Boston until 1901 when it became part of the Boston and Northern Street Railway. By the early 20th century, a number of lines crisscrossed Lynn, with a number of them serving the station. The Bay State Street Railway took over operations in 1911 and joined the Eastern Massachusetts Street Railway in 1919. Trolley service in Lynn lasted until 1938.

The Boston and Maine Railroad built a new, more modern station in 1952 but reused the 1914-built platforms. This single-story building, located on the south side of the tracks at Mt. Vernon and Exchange streets, was in the same flat-roofed brick style as Winchester Center and Wedgemere built five years later. The building was the first on the Boston & Maine system to have radiant heat, and also included a restaurant and newsstand. The 1895-built station was demolished to make room for a parking lot. Saugus Branch service ended in May 1958, followed by Swampscott Branch service in June 1959 (trains to Marblehead) leaving through service on the Eastern Route as the only trains serving Lynn. Around this time, the third and fourth tracks at Lynn, no longer needed for terminating Saugus Branch trains or for shuttles to Marblehead (used on off-peak trains) were removed, leaving the station with effectively two side platforms serving two tracks. By the late 1977, the station was a "shambles", with "broken glass, garbage, vulgar graffiti and crumbling cement."

=== MBTA era ===
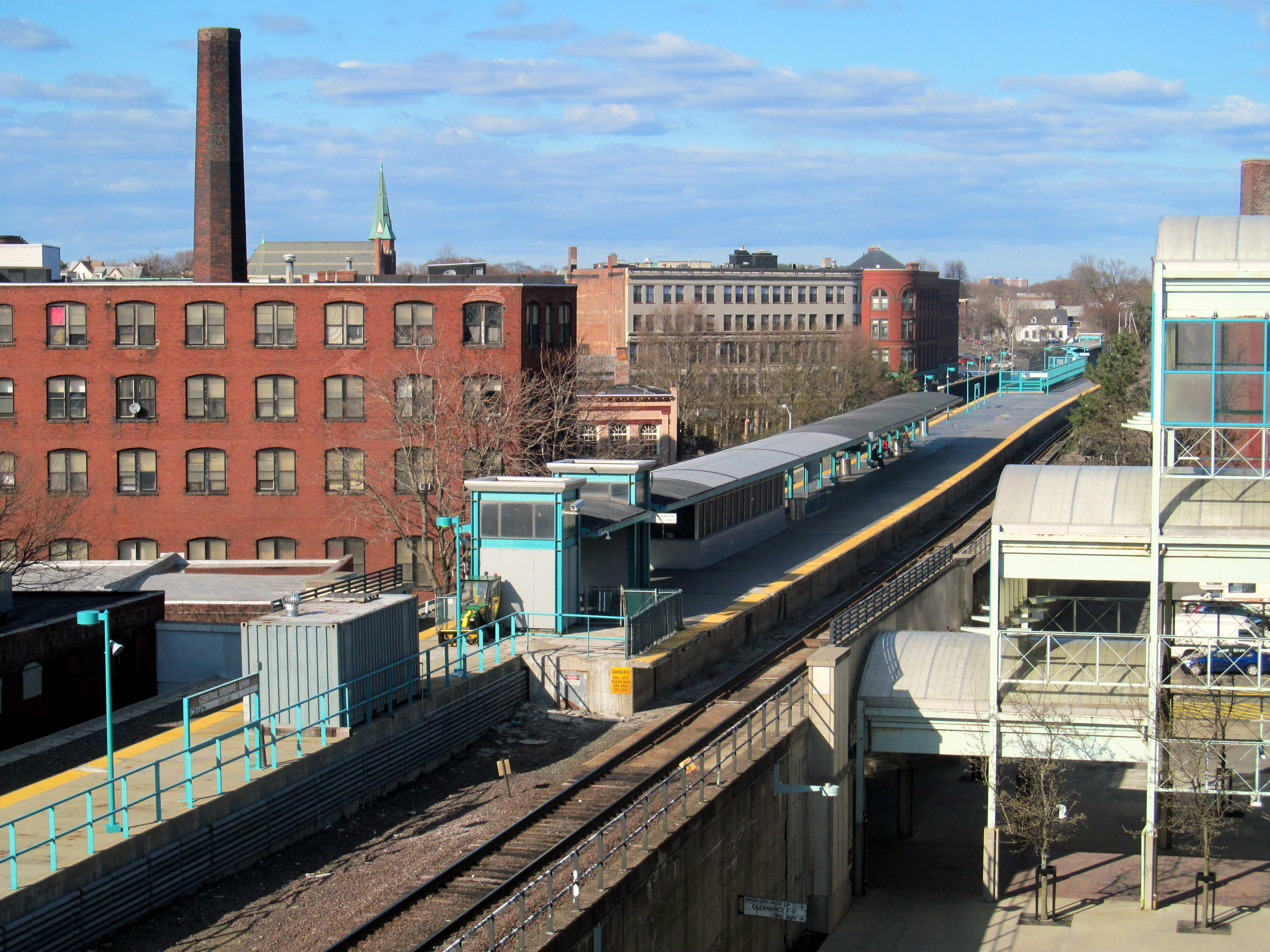
Lynn station viewed from the parking garage in 2015

By the late 1980s, the nearly-40-year-old station and the older platforms were crumbling. Since the Newburyport/Rockport line was no longer a freight clearance route past the General Electric plant in West Lynn, a full-length high-level platform was built to replace the 1952 platforms. The wide platform occupied the width of one former island platform plus one former track slot, with the line's two current tracks on each side. The 1,100-foot (340 m)-long platform was located west of the older low platforms, which were still extant on the viaduct. Entrances to the platform were available from the garage and from Central Square. A 1,000-space parking garage with a drop-off lane was built off Market Street; buses continued to use the former busway on Mount Vernon Street at Central Square. A $41.3 million construction contract for the station and garage was awarded on April 13, 1988, with completion expected in fall 1989.

Construction was 75% complete by early 1991. The facility ultimately opened on January 21, 1992, at a cost of $50 million. The station was constructed with two elevators and an escalator to platform level. The escalator was no longer functional by 1995; it was later walled off along with one elevator. Along with the pair at Framingham, the remaining elevator was one of the few on the commuter rail system maintained by the MBTA, rather than by Amtrak or local agencies.

In 2003, the MBTA spent slightly less than $100,000 to rehabilitate the deteriorated garage and to convert the drop-off lane into a full busway with shelters, benches, and signage. The busway opened on September 9, 2003 and 21 MBTA bus routes were rerouted from Central Square. In late 2005, the MBTA spent $168,000 for repairs to the garage roof, which frequently leaked during rain. The 1992 station was built with new concrete ties supporting the tracks connecting to the station, which proved less durable than expected. In September 2008, the MBTA board authorized a $1 million tie replacement and slope stabilization project at the station.

In 2015, the Lynn garage had the lowest utilization rate of MBTA garages, partially due to safety concerns and partially because it was built to support future Blue Line demand. In 2011, 20 security cameras were added to the station as a reaction to several assaults in the garage. In August 2016, the MBTA began a $6.1 million improvement project at the station. The work includes drainage improvements, sidewalk and cobblestone replacement, stair and elevator repairs, painting of the garage structure to prevent rust, structural repairs to the garage, expansion joint replacement, and platform repairs. It was expected to be completed by November 2016.

Lynn and River Works stations were changed from fare Zone 2 to Zone 1A (allowing subway-fare rides to Boston) from May 22–31, 2020, and July 1, 2020 – June 30, 2021 to provide additional travel options during the COVID-19 pandemic (as many of the 400-series bus routes were reduced in frequency) and to examine the impact of temporary fare changes. The change was found to have diverted just 8 daily riders to commuter rail, and the stations reverted to Zone 2 on July 1, 2021.

=== 2020s renovation ===
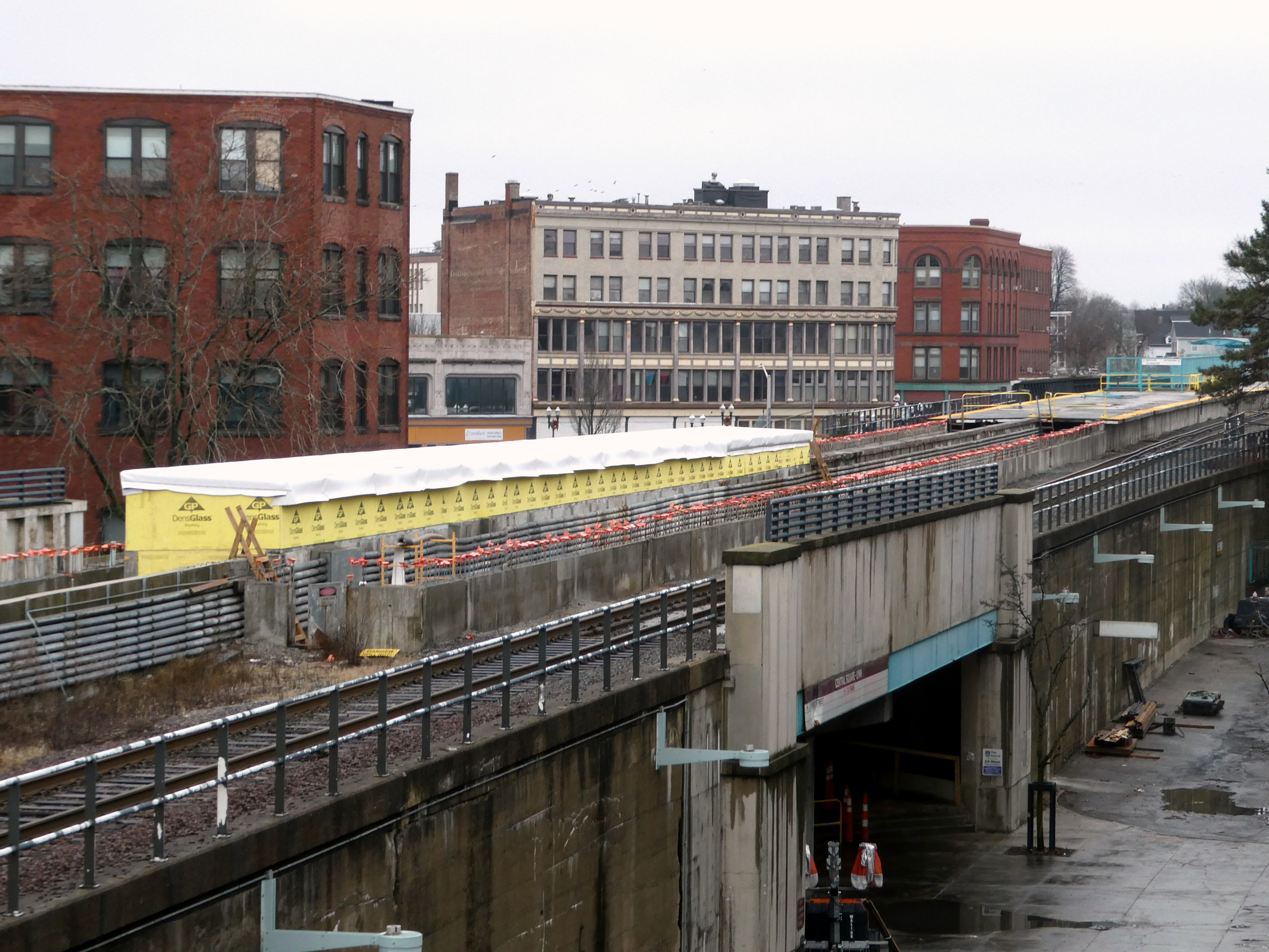
The partially-demolished platform in 2023

The MBTA began planning a major station renovation in 2019; a $3.1 million design contract was awarded in 2021. Design reached 15% by the end of 2021. The $72.5 million project would include a new island platform with elevators at both entrances. The new platform would be somewhat west of the old platform, with a new entrance west of Market Street. On December 20, 2021, the east end of the platform and the Central Square entrance were temporarily closed. Service on the inner portion of the Newburyport/Rockport Line was suspended for several periods in March–September 2022 to accommodate signal work on the line.

On July 12, 2022, the MBTA announced that the commuter rail station would close on July 25, 2022 – earlier than previous plans of spring 2023 – due to deterioration of the station. The garage was to close in spring 2023 for demolition. However, the station closure was delayed to later in 2022 after complaints by local and state officials. The station closed on October 1, 2022. A shuttle bus ran between Lynn and Swampscott, where Zone 2 tickets were temporarily accepted.

Temporary platforms were constructed east of Silsbee Street for use during construction of the new permanent station. Design for the temporary platforms was 75% complete by June 2023, with the platforms then expected to be in service in mid-2024. Construction of the temporary platforms, which reused concrete slabs used by the Big Dig, began in August 2023. They opened on December 18, 2023 – nine months sooner than originally planned.

Demolition of the south half of the platform took place in late 2022 and from August 2023 to January 2024. Demolition of the northern portion took place from mid-2024 into 2025. As of June 2023, the new permanent station is not expected to be complete until 2030, a timeline that was criticized by local officials. In June 2024, the MBTA indicated that "The location of the permanent station is currently being re-evaluated to meet the future needs of the MBTA and the City of Lynn." A design firm was selected in 2025.

In December 2024, the MBTA and the city indicated plans to replace part of the parking garage with transit oriented development. The MBTA issued a request for qualifications for developers in October 2026.

=== Blue Line extension ===
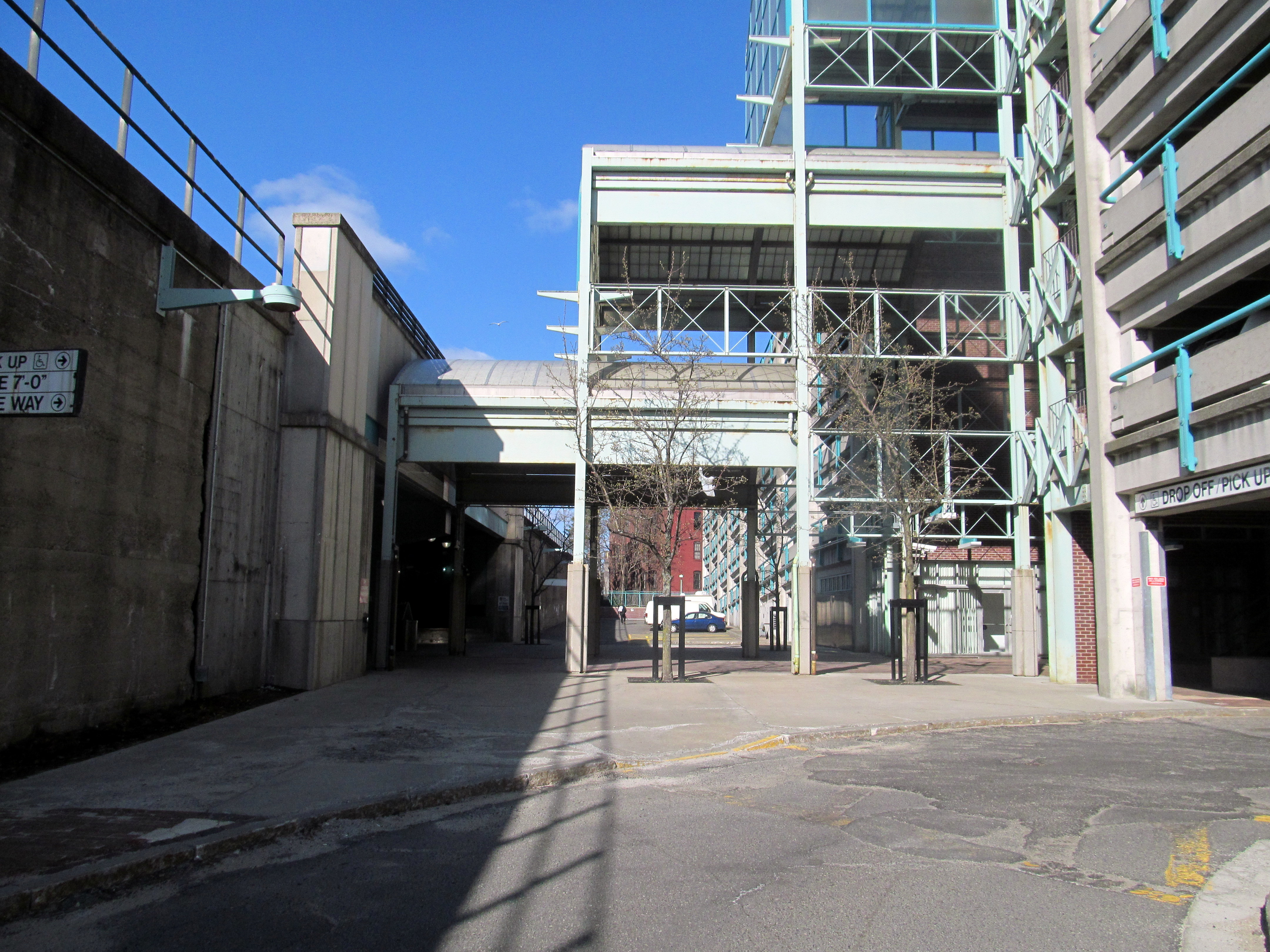
Space between the commuter rail embankment and the garage for the proposed Blue Line platform

Lynn is intended to be the terminus of a future extension of the MBTA Blue Line, which would bring the line an additional 4.5 miles (7.2 km) from Wonderland in Revere to Lynn. This extension has been proposed in various forms for over 90 years. The 1926 Report on Improved Transportation Facilities and 1945–47 Coolidge Commission Report recommended that the East Boston Tunnel line, which had been converted to rapid transit from streetcars in 1924, be extended to Lynn via the Boston, Revere Beach & Lynn right-of-way. Ever since the 1954 Revere extension was cut short to Wonderland, a further extension to Lynn has been planned. Following on the 1926 and 1945-47 studies, the 1966 Program for Mass Transportation recommended that the Blue Line be extended to Lynn, while the 1969 Recommended Highway and Transit Plan proposed that the extension run as far as Salem. An extension was not present in the 1972 Final Report of the Boston Transportation Planning Review, but the 1974 Transportation Plan revived the project with possible termini of Lynn, Salem, or even Route 128 in Peabody. The 1978 Program for Mass Transportation report and 1983 Transportation Plan both continued support for an extension to Lynn. Despite the continued recommendations, however, other projects like extensions of the Red and Orange lines were given funding instead of the Blue Line.

Despite numerous studies on the project and previous bond bills, there is currently no identified funding source; due to the MBTA's constrained finances, construction is not likely to begin soon. The 1992-built Lynn parking garage, designed for the capacity needed for the Blue Line extension, does not fill fully from commuter rail ridership.

=== Other Lynn stations ===
Map showing past and present stations in Lynn

Lynn has also been home to eight other stations on different sites – none of which lasted into the MBTA era – plus a ninth that opened in 1965. Besides its downtown stops, the Eastern Railroad also served East Lynn from 1880 until Marblehead Branch service ended on June 14, 1959. Stairways from the Chatham Street to the station site still exist, although no station building remains. The 1896 depot was disassembled in 1912 in preparation for the downtown grade separation. It was moved to Durham, New Hampshire, where it now serves as the University of New Hampshire Dairy Bar and a station stop on Amtrak's Downeaster service. A West Lynn station was located at Commercial Street at the junction with the Saugus Branch Railroad, and Green Street was briefly located just east of Central Square. Neither the West Lynn nor Green Street buildings remain.

The Boston, Revere Beach & Lynn also served its own Lynn depot (a block away from the Eastern Railroad station) at Market Street near Broad Street, as well its own West Lynn station adjacent to the Eastern Railroad station just east of Commercial Street. Neither station is still extant.

Service on the Saugus Branch Railroad began from Boston to Lynn (via Malden) in 1853, serving Central Square and West Lynn plus three new stations in northwest Lynn. These included Lynn Common station at Western Avenue, Raddin's Station at Summer Street and Raddin Grove Avenue, and East Saugus at Lincoln Avenue on the Saugus/Lynn border. The three station buildings were abandoned around 1943 to reduce the B&M tax bill. Passenger service on the branch ended in May 1958; the branch is now abandoned and being turned into a rail trail. None of the station buildings survive, though the surviving Cliftondale station in Saugus was identical to the East Saugus station.

River Works station is located in West Lynn on the Newburyport/Rockport Line. Opened on September 9, 1965 as G.E. Works, it is for the sole use of GE Aviation employees. Swampscott station, located just outside Lynn in Swampscott, Massachusetts, also serves passengers from East Lynn.
