= Pranker Mills =

Coordinates: 42.4727°N 71.0071°W

Pranker Mills, also known as the Iroquois Mills, is a former American textile mill located in Saugus, Massachusetts that was in operation from 1822 to 1915.

== Construction of the dam and early mills ==
In 1770, Ebenezer Hawkes constructed a roughly made dam about five rods north of the old Saugus Iron Works dam. He also constructed a canal, a grist mill, and a saw mill. In 1794, chocolate manufacturer Benjamin Sweetser, who became one of the most successful chocolate makers in the United States, purchased the property. Around 1796, Sweetser constructed a new chocolate factory about seventy feet northwest of the grist mill. Around 1800, he constructed a new residence north of the factory. From 1816 to 1820, the mill was rented to William Smith, who manufactured chocolate for Chase & Page of Salem, Massachusetts. From 1815 to 1822, the grist and saw mills were leased to Robert Eames, who manufactured dye woods.

== William Gray and early years ==
In 1822, duck cloth manufacturer William Gray took apart his Stoneham, Massachusetts factory and reassembled it between the chocolate and grist mills to form one building about 150 feet in length. Gray's business only lasted about one and a half years. In 1824, Gray leased the property to Brown & Baldwin (later Brown & Baldwin, Haskins), a company that bleached printed calico. The company spent a considerable amount of money making improvements to the mill, however the business was not successful and folded at the end of 1825. In 1826, the property was transferred to True & Broadhead (later known as True & Street), which made many improvements to the mill and repaired and raised the dam. The raising of the dam resulted in a number of lawsuits for flood damage. True & Street later built an 85 foot by 40 foot, three-story brick factory building. In 1829, a portion of the property was leased to flannel manufactures Brierly & Whitehead. In 1832, True & Street went out of business. In 1834, Whitwell, Bond, & Co. purchased the mill, which they used to clean and assort wood. In 1835, Livermore & Kendall purchased the property, which they named Rockville, and managed it for the New England Wool Company. In 1836, Livermore & Kendall moved their operations to Framingham, Massachusetts and the mill remained idle until 1838.

== Purchase by Edward Pranker ==
In 1838, Edward Pranker, an English-born textile manufacturer from Salem, New Hampshire purchased the property on bond and established a flannel and bed sheet manufacturing business. He renovated the mill and installed new machinery. Although the conditions of the wool business in general were extremely poor during the mill's first years of operation, the business was a success. In 1840, he was able to pay off the bond on the property. By 1846, Pranker's business had grown so much that he had to build a second mill. The new mill was a seventy-foot by fifty foot, three story, brick building that adjoined his first one. The factories contained six sets of cards, thirteen jacks, 180 spindles, and forty looms. Also in 1846, Pranker enlarged a dam on the Saugus River by two feet, which raised the water level of a pond that bears his name. In 1857, Pranker, his son George Pranker, and John Armitage incorporated the Edward Pranker & Co. textile firm. Also that year, Pranker had frame buildings constructed for wool pulling and sheepskin tanning. In 1860 he built a two-story, 125 by 60 foot, mill located on opposite side of the road that contained four sets of wool manufacturing equipment.

== Ownership by Pranker family ==
In 1865, Edward Pranker died and ownership of the mill passed to his son George Pranker and son-in-law John Parsons, who ran the business under the name Pranker & Co. In February 1866, a fire damaged the two adjoining brick mills. As a result of the damage, the older mill was reduced from three stories to two. To compensate, a fourth floor was added to the building in 1846. In 1870, Pranker and Parsons brought some of the younger members of the family into the business. In 1877, both Pranker and Parsons died and operations were suspended for two years. In April 1879, six of Edward Pranker's grandchildren formed the Pranker Manufacturing Company, which manufactured wool shirts, dresses, flannels, and sacks. In 1884, a one hundred foot high round brick chimney was constructed next to the building housing the mill's boiler. Pranker Manufacturing Company ran the mills until 1898, when operations were suspended until a settlement was reached with the company's creditors. That year, the business was reorganized as the Saugus Woolen Manufacturing Co. George Parsons, one of Edward Pranker's grandsons, served as the company's president. The mill operated under this arrangement for a few years before the mill went idle and the property was offered for sale.

== United States Worsted Company and closure ==
In 1904, the mills were purchased by the Saugus Manufacturing Company, a new corporation formed by business interests from New Bedford, Massachusetts. Samuel H. Bailey was elected the company's first president and Charles W. Auel, superintendent of the Oneko Woolen Mill in New Bedford, was named superintendent of the mill. The Saugus Manufacturing Company manufactured dress goods and cashmere. The mill was renamed the Iroquois Mills. The Saugus Manufacturing Company fell into bankruptcy due to the Panic of 1907 and in 1908 the business was acquired by a new group of investors and reorganized as the United States Worsted Company. In 1915, the United States Worsted Company closed the Iroquois Mills. They retained ownership until 1928, when the property was sold at auction. As of 2015, the buildings remain in use.
