= Prankers Pond =

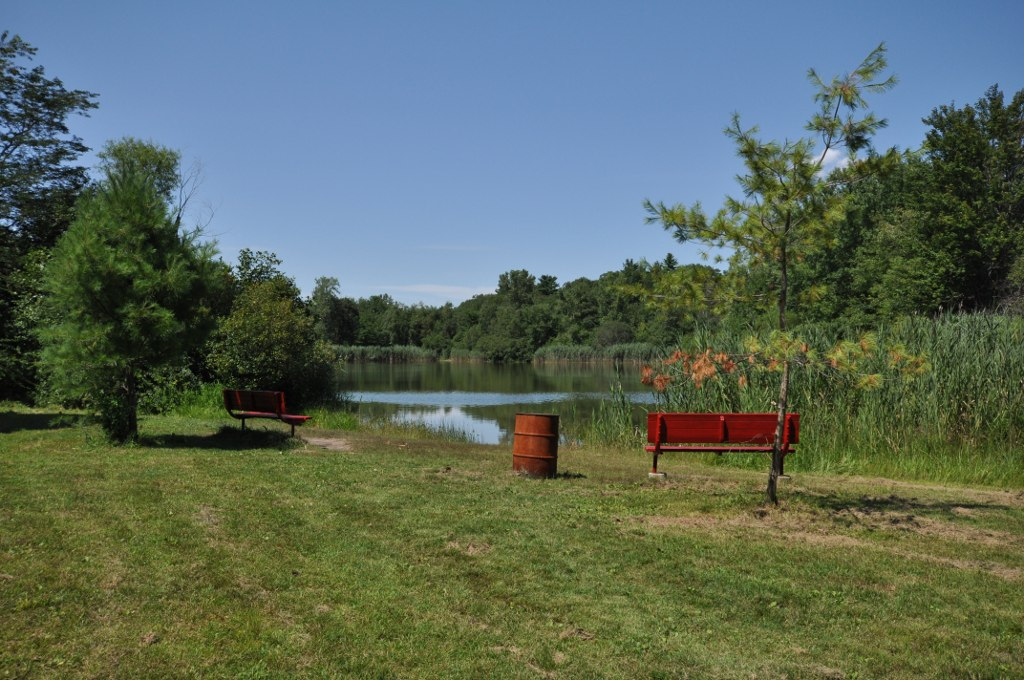

- Location within Massachusetts Location within the United States
- Location: Saugus, Massachusetts
- Coordinates: 42°28′27″N 71°00′45″W
- Type: lake
- Basin countries: United States
- Surface elevation: 26 ft (7.9 m)

Prankers Pond (also Lily Pond or Pranker Pond) is one of the largest lakes in Saugus, Massachusetts, United States. It is the center of a recreational area that also includes hiking and picnicking areas. The pond lies east of U.S. Route 1 and southwest of Birch Pond. Named for Edward Pranker, the owner of the Pranker Mills at the pond, it lies at an elevation of 26 feet (7.9 m).
