= Saugus Branch Railroad =

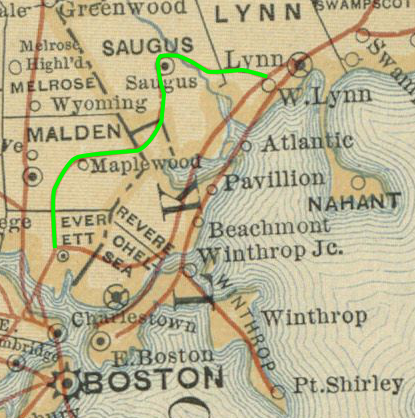
- 1887 map with Saugus Branch highlighted in green

Overview
- Status: Ceased operation
- Owner: Saugus Branch Railroad Co. (1848–1855); Eastern Railroad (1855–1890); Boston & Maine Railroad (1890–1958)
- Locale: Everett, Malden, Revere, Saugus, and Lynn
- Termini: Everett Junction; West Lynn
- Stations: 18

Service
- Operator(s): Eastern (1853–1884); Boston & Maine (1884–1958)

History
- Opened: 1853
- Closed: 1958

Technical
- Line length: 9.5 mi (15.3 km)
- Track gauge: 4 ft 8 1/2 in (1,435 mm)

The Saugus Branch Railroad (often called the Saugus Branch) was an American rail line that operated passenger service from 1853 to 1958. It serviced the Massachusetts communities of Saugus, Malden, Everett, Revere, and Lynn.

== Beginnings ==
The first proposal for a railroad through Saugus came from a group led by George Peabody, who pushed for a railroad from East Boston to Salem over the Saugus marshes. The plan was opposed by Saugonians, as the owners of mills located on the Saugus River feared that a proposed drawbridge over the river would interfere with ships that loaded and unloaded cargo at their wharves. In 1836, the Massachusetts General Court granted the Eastern Railroad a charter to build the Boston to Salem railroad.

In an effort to tap into its competitor's market, the Boston & Maine Railroad petitioned the Massachusetts General Court in 1845 for a charter to build a railroad from Malden to Salem through Saugus, Lynnfield, and South Danvers. The plan was not approved.

In 1846, Joshua Webster proposed a railroad line from Saugus to Malden that would connect with the Boston & Maine Railroad in Malden. Eastern countered by proposing a line from Lynn to Saugus Center. In 1848 the legislature approved Webster's plan and granted his group^{1} a charter for the Saugus Branch Railroad Co.

Before construction began, the route was extended to Lynn Common and altered to include the Saugus neighborhood of Sweetser's Corner (now known as Cliftondale) and the Malden neighborhood of East Malden (now known as Linden). Construction began in 1850, but dragged along due to a lack of funds.

Eastern believed that this new route would cost it half of its revenues because it would provide direct access to Boston, which Eastern did not offer (Eastern patrons were to transfer to ferries at East Boston). To overcome this challenge, Eastern's directors chose to purchase stock in the Saugus Branch Railroad Co. at the inflated price of $80 a share. On April 30, 1852, the Eastern Railroad Co. purchased all the rights of the Saugus Branch and assumed its operations. In October 1852, Gardiner Greene Hubbard succeeded Webster as the president of the Saugus Branch Railroad Co.

== Passenger service ==
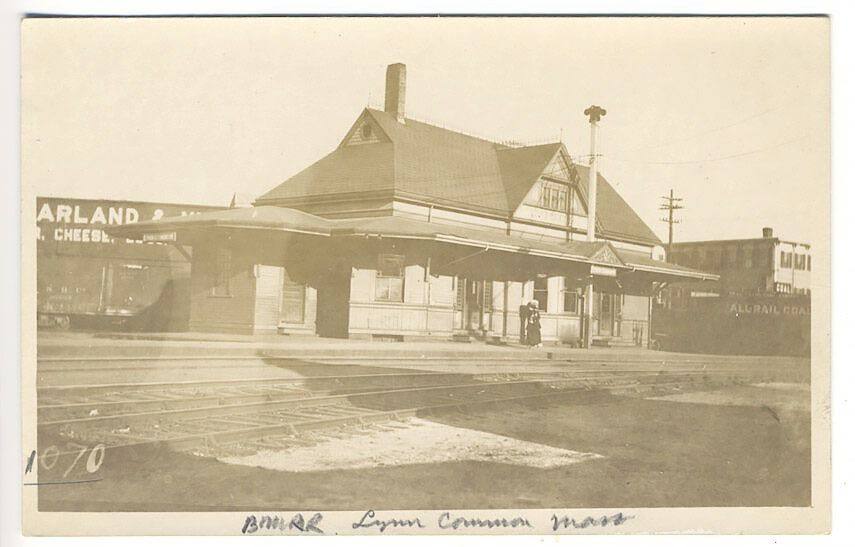
Lynn Common station on an early postcard

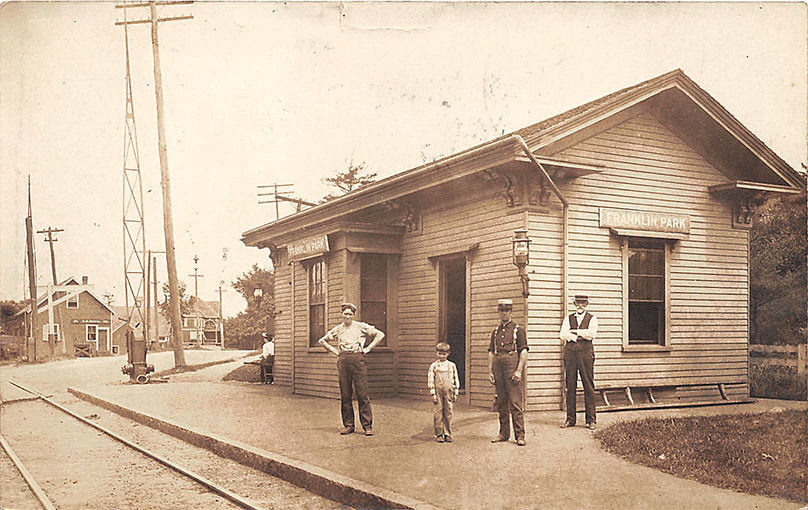
Franklin Park station in 1907

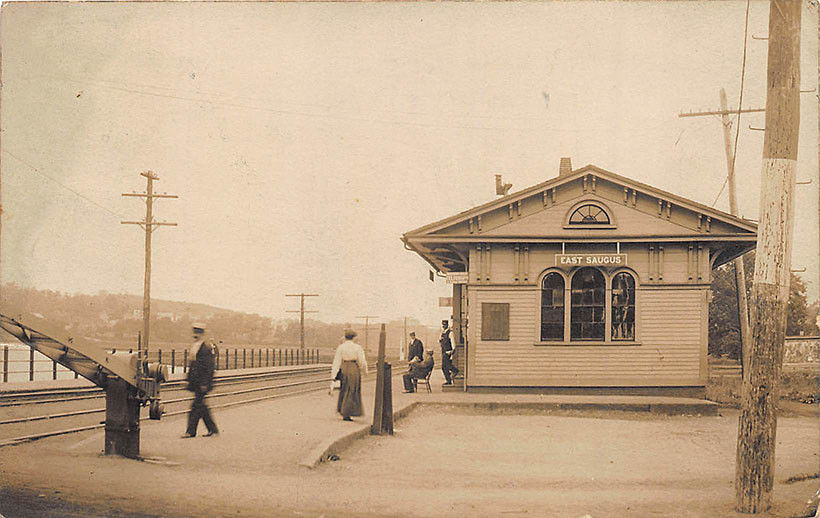
East Saugus station in 1910

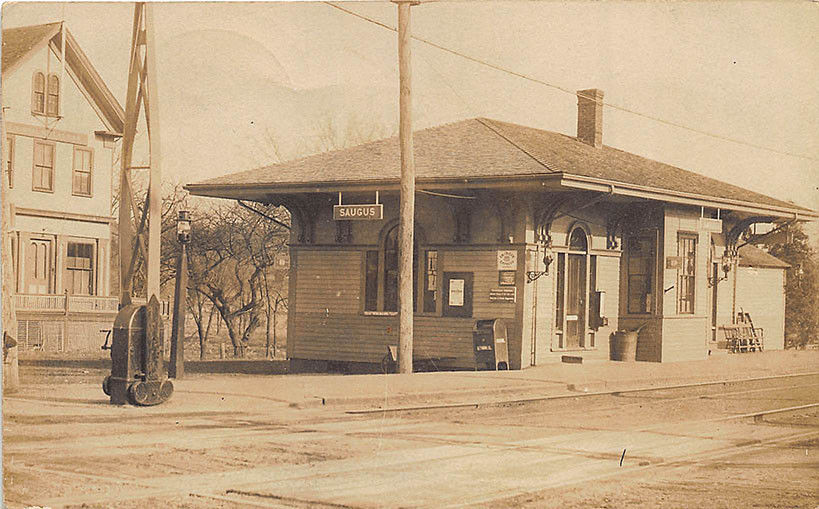
Saugus station

On February 1, 1853, the Saugus Branch opened for passengers. Andrews Breed served as the Saugus Branch's first superintendent. During the early days of the Saugus Branch, four trains a day were run from Lynn Common to Edgeworth in Malden with stops in East Saugus, Saugus Center, Cliftondale, East Malden (later Linden), and Maplewood. On April 10, 1854, the original 8.4 mile route was extended to the Grand Junction line in South Malden (now Everett) and to West Lynn, where it connected with Eastern's main line. This new line gave Eastern its first direct route into Boston as well as an alternate route. The connection with the B&M at Malden was also abandoned, though a short stub was used as an industrial siding by the B&M. In 1855, the Saugus Branch Railroad Co. was consolidated into the Eastern Railroad Co. For the remainder of its life, Lynn was the terminus for most Saugus Branch trains, though a limited number continued to Salem until World War I.

Historian Francis B. C. Bradlee would describe the Saugus Branch as "one of the few fortunate investments of the Eastern" as it gave it access to the growing suburbs of Boston. He also wrote that "until the coming of the electric trolley cars connecting with the Elevated Railroad, it was probably one of the best paying stretches of railroad in New England". By 1869, there were fourteen passenger trips a day.

During the 1870s, Eastern was plagued by a series of accidents. the most notable being the Great Revere Train Wreck of 1871. In 1884 the Boston & Maine leased Eastern and in 1890 it consolidated Eastern into its system. Once B&M took control, the Saugus Branch underwent improvements, including telegraphs for dispatching train orders and turning the line into a double track.

During the 1890s, passenger service on the Saugus branch peaked. In 1893, there were 36 trips per day on the Saugus Branch. Use of the Saugus Branch in Malden slowly declined after the opening of the Boston Elevated Railway (also known as the El) in 1901. Business in the Lynn and Saugus segments was not as affected. In 1919 the El was extended to Everett and the Saugus Branch was considered for the expansion from Everett to Malden. At a legislative hearing on the issue, the B&M opposed using the Saugus Branch because it had a freight load of 5,000 cars per year and the El wanted to purchase only the Malden segment, not the entire branch.

In 1919, the number of passenger trips had fallen to sixteen a day. By the mid-1920s passenger service on the Saugus Branch decreased to twelve trips per day. The service declined even more during the Great Depression, with only three inbound trains and six outbound trains run. During World War II, use of the passenger service increased due to gasoline rationing. However, once the war was over, use once again declined. On July 29, 1948, B&M petitioned the Massachusetts Department of Public Utilities (D.P.U.) to discontinue all passenger service on the Saugus Branch. B&M reported that expenses for the Saugus Branch were $115,145 while annual passenger revenue was only $48,029. The D.P.U. rejected the petition on November 18, 1949, finding that the railroad did not show that there was a lack of public interest in maintaining the Saugus Branch. Although the branch was saved, by 1954 there were only two morning trips to Boston and two returns trips during the evening.

In 1956, the B&M ended all steam operations and began using Budd Rail Diesel Cars (also known as Buddliners or RDCs). However, the new railcars were not heavy enough to trip the signals on the Saugus Branch.

In September 1957, B&M once again petitioned the D.P.U. for permission to end passenger service on the Saugus Branch, citing extensive losses. An Essex County-wide opposition movement formed as three hundred or so commuters still used the line. In December a formal hearing was held in which both sides presented their case. Saugus Town Moderator and Essex County Commissioner C. F. Nelson Pratt was the most forceful opponent of the change and hyperbolically stated during the hearing that area residents would be forced to use "dog sleds" for winter commuting. On April 18, 1958, the DPU approved the B&M's petition. On May 16, 1958, the Saugus Branch saw its final scheduled passenger train. At the time, only 300 daily commuters used the two daily round trips.

=== Stations ===
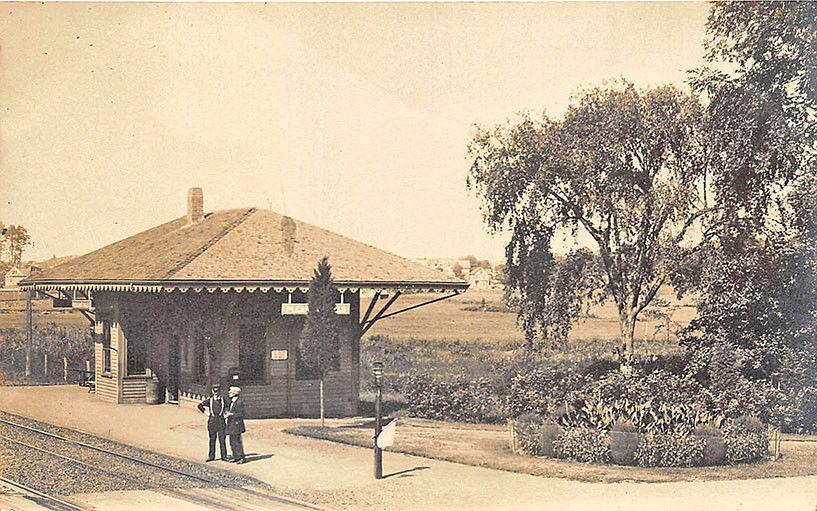
Pleasant Hills station

The Saugus Branch had seventeen stations; all but Everett Junction remained in service until 1958.

- West Lynn, located in Lynn on Commercial Street at the junction with the Eastern main line.
- Lynn Common, located in Lynn on Western Avenue.
- Raddin's, located in Lynn at Summer Street and Raddin Grove Avenue.
- East Saugus, located on the Lynn/Saugus border at Lincoln Avenue.
- Saugus, located in Saugus on Central Street. One of two stations still standing.
- Pleasant Hills, located in Saugus on Adams Avenue.
- Cliftondale, located in Saugus at 5 Eustis Street. The name Cliftondale is believed to have originated with Saugus Branch president Joshua Webster. Cliftondale later replaced Sweester's Corner as the popular name for this neighborhood. One of two stations still standing.
- Franklin Park, located in Revere on Salem Street, just outside Saugus.
- Linden, located in Malden on Lynn Street near Beach Street.
- Broadway, located in Malden on Broadway near Eastern Avenue.
- Maplewood, located in Malden on Maplewood Street near Waite Street. The name Maplewood comes from the hundreds of maple trees Joshua Webster planted on the railroad's property.
- Faulkner, located in Malden on Faulkner Street.
- Malden Center (also known as Malden), located in Malden on Ferry Street. Not to be confused with the MBTA station of the same name or the Malden Station on Summer Street that now serves as a restaurant.
- Edgeworth, located in Malden off Medford Street, near Pearl Street. It was the terminus of the Saugus Branch from its launch in 1853 to 1854, when the Eastern Railroad successfully petitioned the legislature to have the B&M station removed from their line.
- Bell Rock, located in Malden at the foot of Converse Avenue.
- West Everett, located in Everett, originally on Waters Avenue, but moved to the foot of Prescott Street in 1882.
- West Street, located on West Street in Everett.
- Everett Junction, located in Everett at the Revere Beach Parkway and Broadway. Formerly known as South Malden Junction.

The stations of the Saugus Branch were not considered to be architecturally significant or even physically attractive. In 1933, the Malden News described them as "the most mousey, dilapidated, antique stations to be found this side of the land of the Hottentots".

== Later use ==
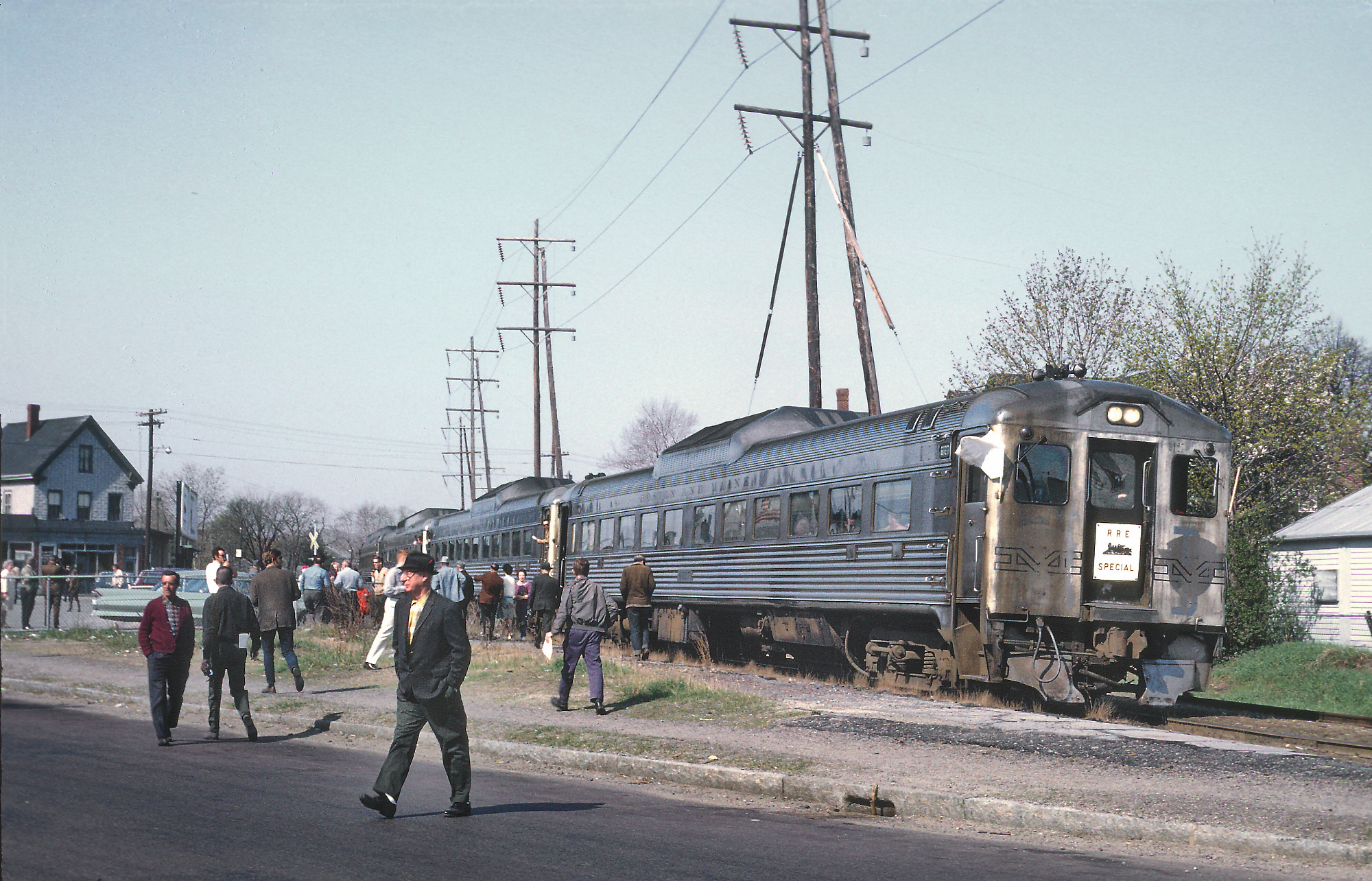
Railroad Enthusiasts trip the Saugus Branch on April 27, 1969

After passenger service was ended, the semaphore signals were removed and the stations were sold. The line was converted to a single-track operation and still used for freight until 1993. Hopper cars delivered road salt to the state's storage area in Revere. Occasional deliveries were made to Eastern Industrial Oil Products in Saugus. In 1968 and 1969, the line was used to transport gravel from Bow, New Hampshire to Revere during construction of roadbeds for the expansion of the Northeast Expressway. Between April and November 1968, there were four trips a day from Bow to the construction site with each train carrying 48 or 60 cars. In the spring of 1969, construction resumed with two trips per day. A total of 3.5 million cubic yards of gravel were transported to the site. Construction was completed on May 27, 1969, although the new expressway (intended to become part of Interstate 95 in Massachusetts) was never finished, being cancelled due to regional opposition.

On April 27, 1969, the New England division of Railroad Enthusiasts ran the North Shore Rail Ramble, a day-trip over freight lines formerly used by passenger trains, including the Saugus Branch.

The Chelsea fire of October 14, 1973 caused the B&M's mainline to be blocked by firefighting equipment. To restore service to the North Shore, the B&M detoured its commuter service over the Saugus Branch.

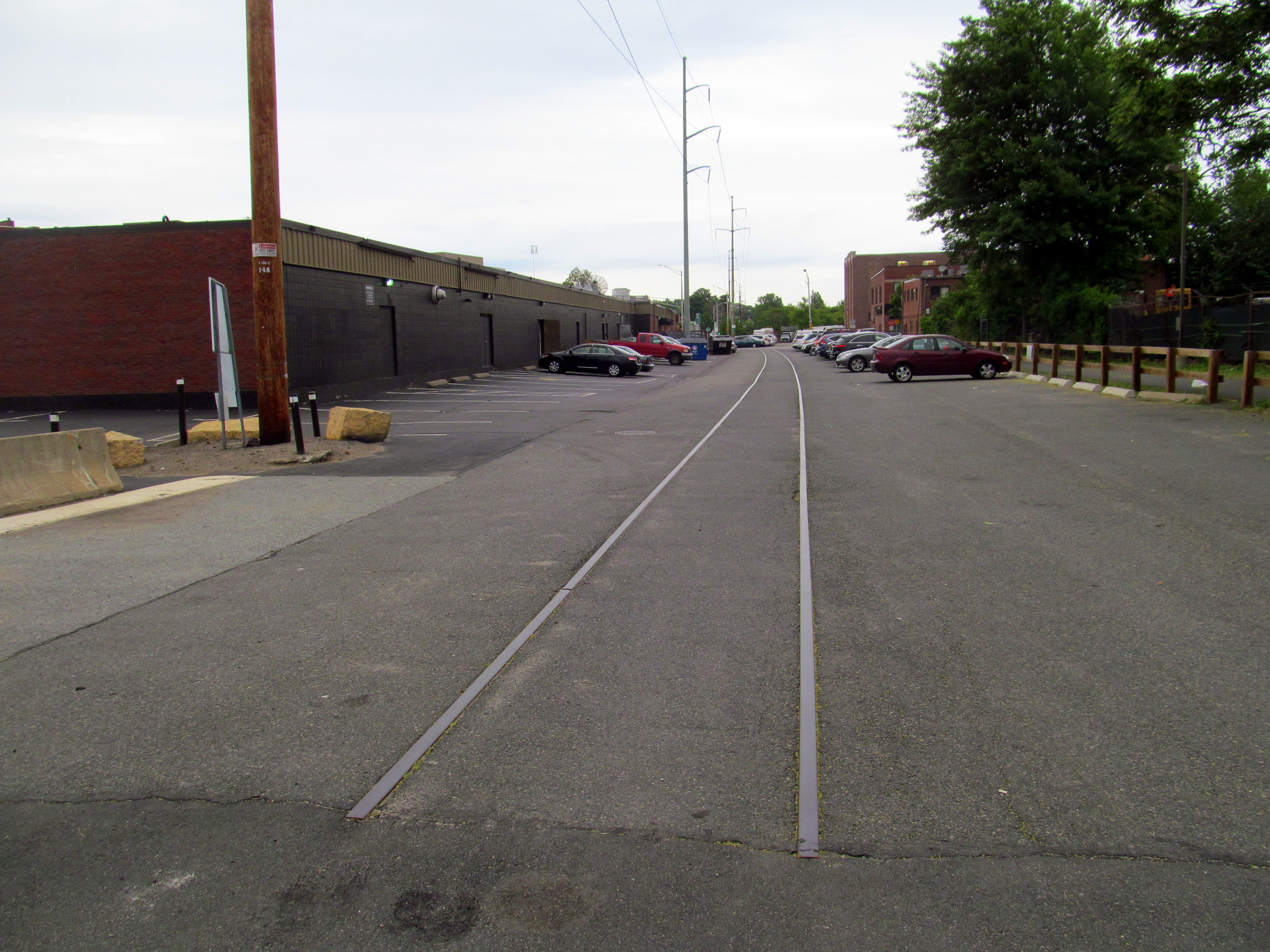
Saugus Branch rails in a Malden parking lot in 2015

On December 27, 1976, the Massachusetts Bay Transportation Authority purchased the remaining B&M commuter assets, including rolling stock and the four active northside lines (save for the lower Haverhill Line, purchased three years earlier for the Haymarket North Extension). Included in the sale were also a number of branch lines no longer used for passenger service, including the Saugus Branch, to be landbanked for possible future service.

The reactivation of the Saugus Branch was considered during the MBTA's North Shore Transit Improvements project in the 2000s, as reactivation would allow for the continued operation of MBTA Commuter Rail service as well as new rapid transit service between Revere and Salem. The North Shore Transit Improvements Project-Major Investment Study concluded that the Saugus Branch plan provided the MBTA with an option to accommodate a rapid transit system while preserving commuter rail service north of Salem, by rerouting commuter trains over the Saugus Branch and converting the Eastern Route mainline into a Blue Line branch at least as far as Lynn. However, the plan was deemed infeasible for several reasons. Unlike the Eastern Route, the Saugus Branch is curvy; it would require 15 to 20 extra minutes for commuter trains to travel, leaving them no longer time-competitive with driving. The section of the Newburyport/Rockport Line south of Salem is one of the busiest segments of mainline railroad in Massachusetts; diverting as many as 60 trains per day would pose significant environmental, social, and physical impacts to the communities along the Saugus Branch. Additionally, encroachment since 1958 would make the restoration of double track difficult, and prevent the addition of a multi-use trail.

== Northern Strand Community Trail ==
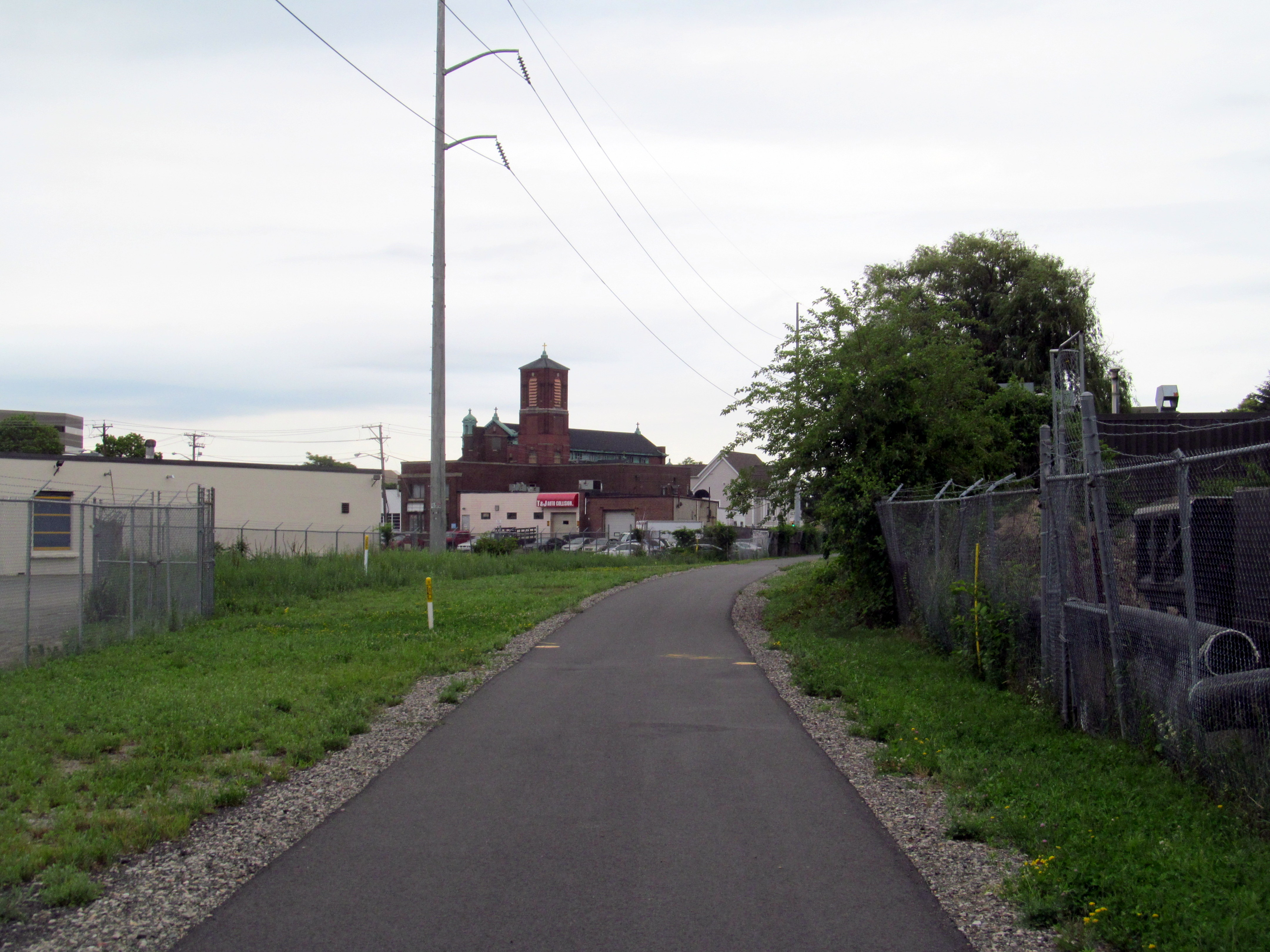
The Northern Strand Community Trail in Malden in 2015

The Saugus Branch line will soon be the route of Northern Strand Community Trail, a 9-mile bicycle path and walking trail that will run through Everett, Malden, Revere, Saugus, and Lynn. On July 13, 2013, the trail entered the final stage of construction.

== In literature ==
The Saugus Branch mentioned in and is part of the title of Elliot Paul's 1947 memoir Linden on the Saugus Branch.

The Saugus Branch is mentioned in Samuel McChord Crothers' By the Christmas Fire.

== Notes ==
1. The charter was granted to Webster, Edward Pranker, George W. Raddin, William Parker, James Eaton, and Gilbert Haven.
