= Edward Pranker =

English-American textile manufacturer (1792–1865)

Edward Pranker (1792–1865) was an English-American textile manufacturer who owned the Pranker Mills in Saugus, Massachusetts.

== Early life and business ==
Pranker was born in 1792 in Wilton, Wiltshire. In 1820 he emigrated to the United States. He engaged in the manufacturing of woolen goods in North Andover, Massachusetts until 1832 or 1833, when he moved to Salem, New Hampshire. He would eventually sell his Salem operation to his business partner.

== Pranker Mills ==
In 1838, Pranker purchased an abandoned mill in Saugus, Massachusetts. He renovated the mill and installed new machinery. At his mill, Pranker engaged in the manufacturing of flannel and bed sheets. Although the conditions of the wool business in general were extremely poor during the mill's first years of operation, the business was a success. In 1840, he was able to pay off the bond on the property. By 1846, Pranker's business had grown so much that he had to build a second mill. Also in 1846, Pranker enlarged a dam on the Saugus River by two feet, which raised the water level of a pond that bears his name. In 1857, Pranker, his son George Pranker, and John Armitage incorporated the Edward Pranker & Co. textile firm. Also that year, Pranker had frame buildings constructed for wool pulling and sheepskin tanning. In 1860 he built another mill on the opposite side of the road. Pranker remained involved with the business until his death in 1865.

In addition to textile manufacturing, Pranker was also one of the founders of the Saugus Branch Railroad.
