= Swampscott station =

Rail station in Swampscott, Massachusetts, US

Swampscott
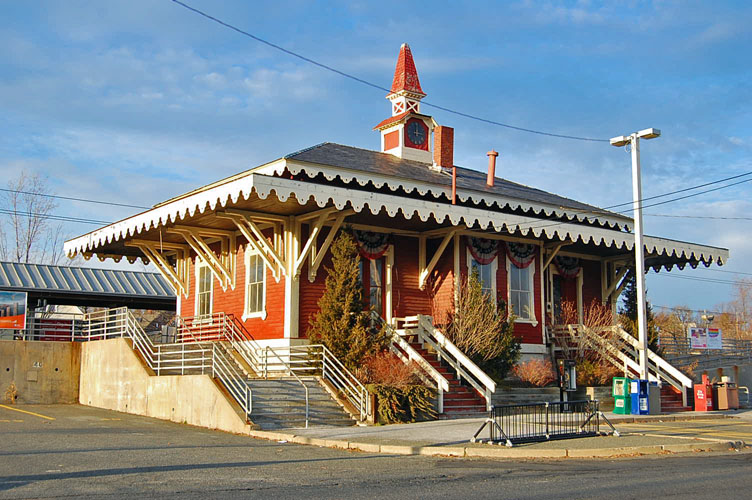
- The 1868-built Swampscott station in 2008

General information
- Location: 10 Railroad Avenue; Swampscott, Massachusetts
- Line: Eastern Route
- Platforms: 2 side platforms
- Tracks: 2

Construction
- Parking: 131 spaces
- Accessible: yes

Other information
- Fare zone: 3

History
- Opened: 1836 (original station)
- Rebuilt: 1868 (current station); 1997 (renovation)

Passengers
- 2024: 737 daily boardings

Services
Preceding station	MBTA	Following station
Lynn toward North Station	Newburyport/Rockport Line	Salem toward Newburyport or Rockport
- Swampscott Railroad Depot
- U.S. National Register of Historic Places
- Interactive map of Swampscott Railroad Depot
- Location: Swampscott, Massachusetts, USA
- Coordinates: 42°28′25″N 70°55′21″W
- Built: 1868
- Architect: Cram, George W.; Eastern RR
- Architectural style: Stick/Eastlake
- NRHP reference No.: 98001106
- Added to NRHP: August 28, 1998
Location

Swampscott station is a historic railroad station in Swampscott, Massachusetts. Located in the southwest portion of Swampscott near the Lynn border, it serves the MBTA Commuter Rail Newburyport/Rockport Line. The historic Stick/Eastlake-style depot building, was originally built in 1868 for the Eastern Railroad, but is no longer in use. The location still serves as an accessible MBTA Commuter Rail stop and park-and-ride location for Swampscott and adjoining Marblehead. The building was added to the National Register of Historic Places in 1998 as Swampscott Railroad Depot.

== History ==
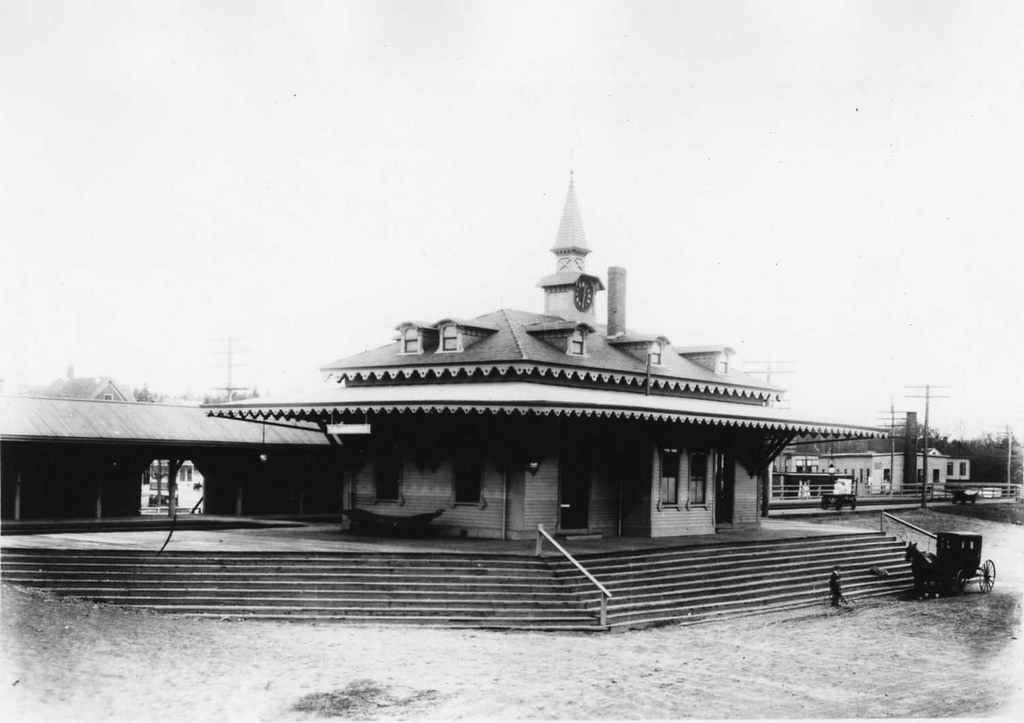
Swampscott station around 1900

The existing station building was originally built in 1868 for the Eastern Railroad; it was designed by George W. Cram, a Boston housewright. The ticket office in the station building closed on February 22, 1952.

On February 28, 1956, a southbound Salem–Boston commuter train crashed into the rear of a stopped Portsmouth–Boston local train just north of the station during a snowstorm. The collision, blamed on the engineer operating at unsafe speeds for the conditions, killed 13 people and injured 283.

By 1977, the station building was used by the Jaycees. The structure was renovated by a group of locals in the 1980s to save it from demolition, but the work was temporary. In 1997, a town committee raised $15,000 to restore the exterior to its original condition, but no interior work was done. On August 28, 1998 it was listed on the National Register of Historic Places.

In 2005, the town attempted to sell the station to a developer, but negotiations stalled in 2006. In 2010, the town again began soliciting proposals for reuse; however, the station has not received proper interior renovations, making reuse difficult. A December 2012 town report advocated for mixed-use development at the station, as well as a pedestrian crossing between the platforms. In 2012, Swampscott station was signed as "Stanton Station" for use in the 2013 film Grown Ups 2.

=== Rail trail ===
In 2004, a town report proposed various transportation improvements, including improving pedestrian and bicycle access to the station from other areas in the town. This included the construction of a mixed-use path on the former Swampscott Branch right-of-way. Service on the Swampscott Branch, which diverged just north of the station, was discontinued in 1959 as the Boston & Maine Railroad shed unprofitable branch lines. The northern section in Marblehead was previously converted to part of the Marblehead Rail Trail, which runs along the former Marblehead Branch to South Salem. In 2012, the town drafted an eminent domain claim to obtain part of the right-of-way near the station from National Grid, who was not opposed to the trail but had much stricter requirements to allow conversion.

== See also ==
- National Register of Historic Places listings in Essex County, Massachusetts
