= John Armitage (manufacturer) =

Scottish-American textile businessman and politician

Member of the Massachusetts House of Representatives for the 20th Essex District
- In office 1870–1870
- Preceded by: James Hewes
- Succeeded by: Jacob B. Calley

Personal details
- Born: August 20, 1812 Jedburgh
- Died: 1893 (aged 80 or 81) Saugus, Massachusetts
- Resting place: Riverside Cemetery; Saugus, Massachusetts
- Spouse: Nancy Goodhue (1838-1893; his death)
- Occupation: Textile manufacturer

John Armitage (1812–1893) was a Scottish-American textile manufacturer and politician.

== Personal life ==
Armitage was born on August 20, 1812, in Jedburgh. In 1838 he married Nancy Goodhue. They had ten children, seven of whom survived into adulthood. In 1865 the Armitages had a large estate constructed on five acres of land on Summer Street in Saugus.

== Business career ==
Armitage worked in the woolen business for many years as a laborer, spinner, and weaver before becoming a partner in Edward Pranker & Co. in 1857. In 1860, the company built a two-story, 125 by 60 foot, mill opposite their existing mill that contained four sets of wool manufacturing equipment. Armitage remained with the company until Pranker's death in 1865. He was also a director of the Saugus Mutual Fire Insurance Company.

== Politics ==
Armitage held various political offices in Saugus. In 1870 he represented the 20th Essex District, which comprised the towns of Saugus, Lynnfield, Middleton, and Topsfield.
