= Swampscott train wreck =

1956 railway incident in Massachusetts, United States

Details
- Date: February 28, 1956 (70 years ago); 8:10 am
- Location: Swampscott, Massachusetts
- Coordinates: 42°28′38″N 70°55′05″W
- Country: U.S.
- Operator: Boston and Maine Railroad
- Incident type: Rear-end collision between moving train and stopped train
- Cause: Operation at unsafe speed

Statistics
- Trains: 2
- Deaths: 13
- Injured: 283

The Swampscott train wreck occurred on February 28, 1956, in Swampscott, Massachusetts when a Danvers–Boston commuter train crashed into the rear of a stopped Portsmouth–Boston local train just north of the station during a snowstorm. The collision, blamed on the engineer operating at unsafe speeds for the conditions, killed 13 people and injured 283.

== Accident ==
On the morning of February 28, 1956, Train 214 departed from Portsmouth, New Hampshire, for Boston. The diesel locomotive was scheduled to depart Portsmouth at 6:40 a.m. and make 10 stops before arriving in Boston at 8:14 a.m. However, due to a blizzard and power-failure problems, Train 214 had made three unscheduled stops, the final of which occurred just short of the Swampscott station. Due to the snow, the engineer was unable to read the track signals and he stopped the train to use a signal phone 200 yards (180 m) down the track to call the Lynn signal tower to ask about the signal indication.

Train 2406, a Buddliner, was scheduled to depart Danvers, Massachusetts, at 7:13 a.m. and make four or five stops before arriving in Boston at 8:33 a.m.

At 8:10 a.m., Train 2406, which was traveling from Salem, Massachusetts, at a speed of roughly 50 miles per hour (80 km/h), crashed into the back of the stationary Train 214. There were 1,000 passengers on the two trains at the time of the accident. 11 passengers and the engineer and fireman of Train 2406 were killed and 71 passengers from both trains were hospitalized. Most of the deceased were traveling in the lead car of Train 2406, which had its roof and one side torn off. The cars were so badly mangled it took over six hours to free all of the trapped passengers. Over 800 police, fire, civil defense, and Red Cross workers were at the scene, with police from as far as 20 miles (32 km) away responding. A first-aid station was set up in a nearby lumber yard and garage and the Swampscott fire station was used as a temporary morgue. The deceased were transported via a moving van that had been passing the scene of the accident.

At 9:45 a.m., around 100 of the survivors of the Swampscott train wreck were injured in a second wreck when one of the trains they were traveling in collided with a stalled train also carrying survivors. However, because the train was traveling very slowly at the time of the collision, there were no fatalities and only one serious injury.

== Investigation ==
The accident was investigated by the Boston and Maine Railroad, the Interstate Commerce Commission (ICC), and the Massachusetts Department of Public Utilities (DPU). It was the ICC's first investigation into a railroad accident since the 1953 Pennsylvania Railroad train wreck. The ICC and DPU chose to hold joint hearings into the accident.

The Boston and Maine Railroad found the engineer of Train 2406 to blame for the accident. He had passed through two warning signals and passed a flagman from Train 214 prior to the accident. If he was unable to see these signals due to the storm, the operating rules of the railroad required him to stop the train.

The Interstate Commerce Commission's investigation found no mechanical issues with the Buddliner and determined the train shouldn't have been traveling that fast.

== See also ==
- List of disasters in Massachusetts by death toll
