= Northern Strand Community Trail =

Public Trail in northeast Massachusetts

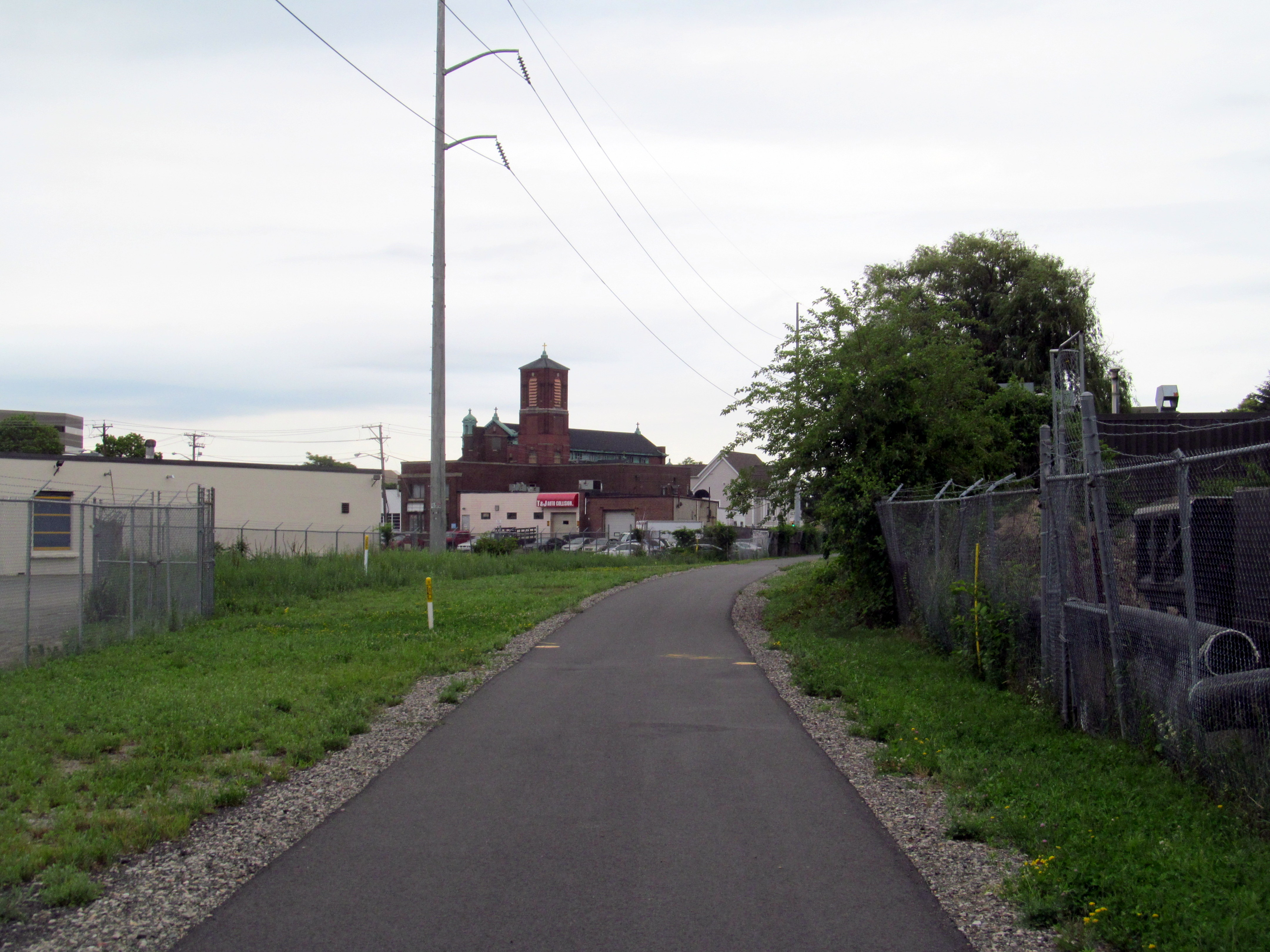
The trail in Malden in June 2015

The Northern Strand Community Trail, also known as the Bike to the Sea Trail, is a 10-mile public-use path project, including a rail trail portion, which connects the cities of Everett, Malden, Revere, Saugus, and Lynn, along the former Saugus Branch Railroad of the Boston & Maine Railroad and other shared-use roads. The trail is part of the East Coast Greenway, a project planning to connect almost 3,000 miles of trail from Calais, Maine to Key West, Florida. The path has been planned by Bike to the Sea, a non-profit cycling advocacy group, with help from the surrounding cities.

== History ==
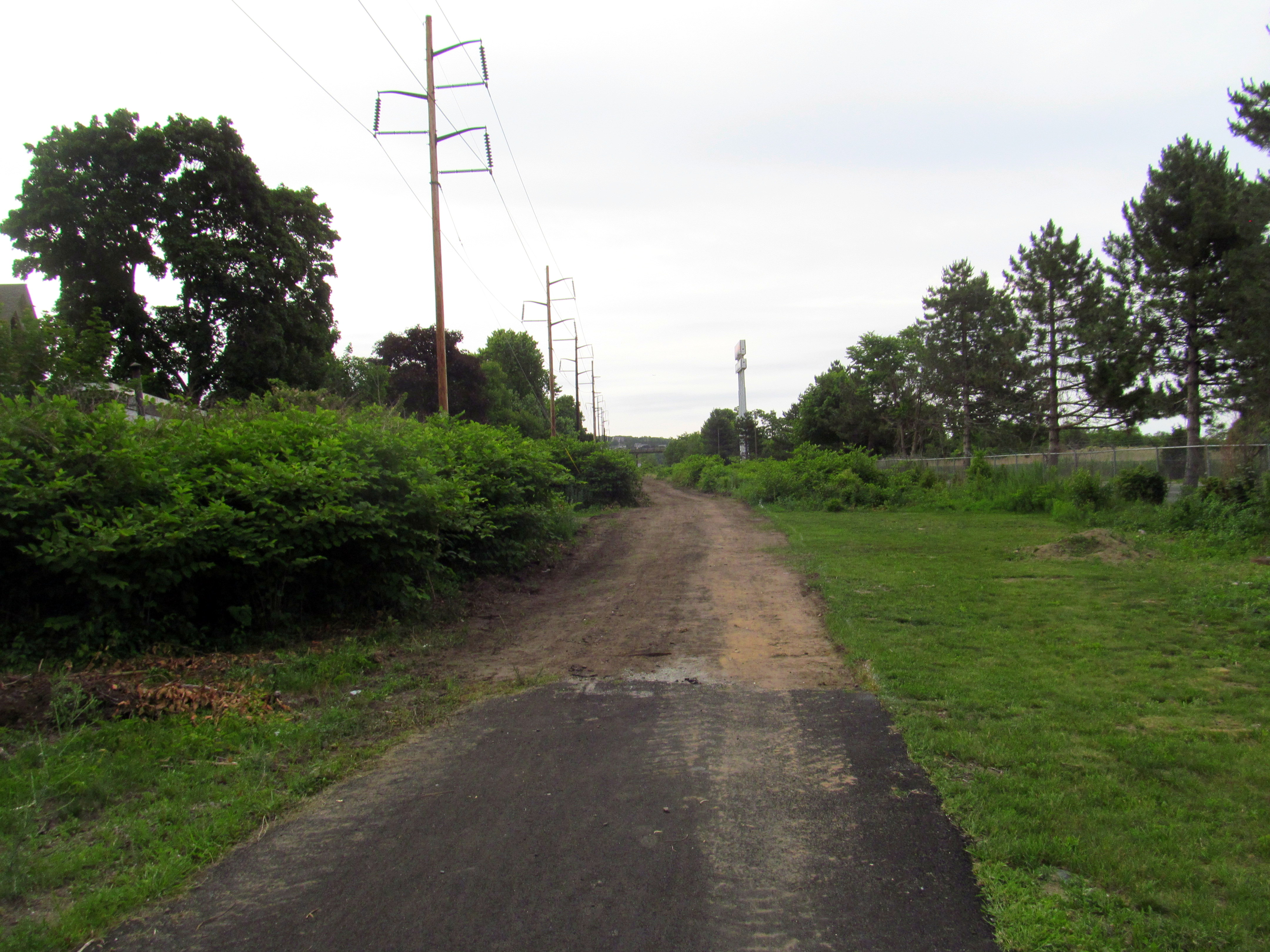
The trail at the Malden/Revere border in June 2015

The trail primarily runs along the Saugus Branch Railroad, a former branch line of the Boston and Maine Railroad. The trail's right of way is leased from the Massachusetts Bay Transportation Authority for 99 years by the respective cities the trail passes through. Like many nearby rail-trails, these leases include a reversion clause should the right of way be deemed more useful for other transportation uses.

The Everett and Malden sections of the trail were opened with a granular recycled asphalt surface in summer 2012 and paved with an asphalt surface in August 2013. Iron Horse Preservation completed the surfacing of the Saugus section of the trail with gravel. The Revere portion of the trail opened to the public with a recycled asphalt surface in Summer 2015.

The state committed $1.5 million in February 2018 to complete design of a Lynn section. A $13.7 million construction contract was awarded in February 2020 with the goal of finishing a Lynn portion of the trail, and extending the southern terminus of the trail south through Everett to the Mystic river. The West Lynn section opened on November 19, 2021.

In September 2020, the governor of Massachusetts announced the Shared Streets & Spaces Emergency Grant Program to mitigate the COVID-19 pandemic would grant $150,000 to the city of Swampscott to build a linear park on abandoned rail bed to connect to the existing Northern Strand in Lynn to the south and the Marblehead Rail Trail to the north (which continues as the Salem Parkway Multi-Use Path).

Plans presented on November 17, 2021, call for additional expansion of the trail through downtown Lynn to Nahant. A separated / protected trail facility is planned, to run from Western Avenue in Lynn to the Lynn & Nahant shoreline. The state awarded $263,000 for right-of-way acquisition in 2022.

At the southern end, construction of a pedestrian and bicycle bridge to Draw 7 Park in Assembly Square is expected to last from 2026 to 2029.
