= Eastern Railroad =

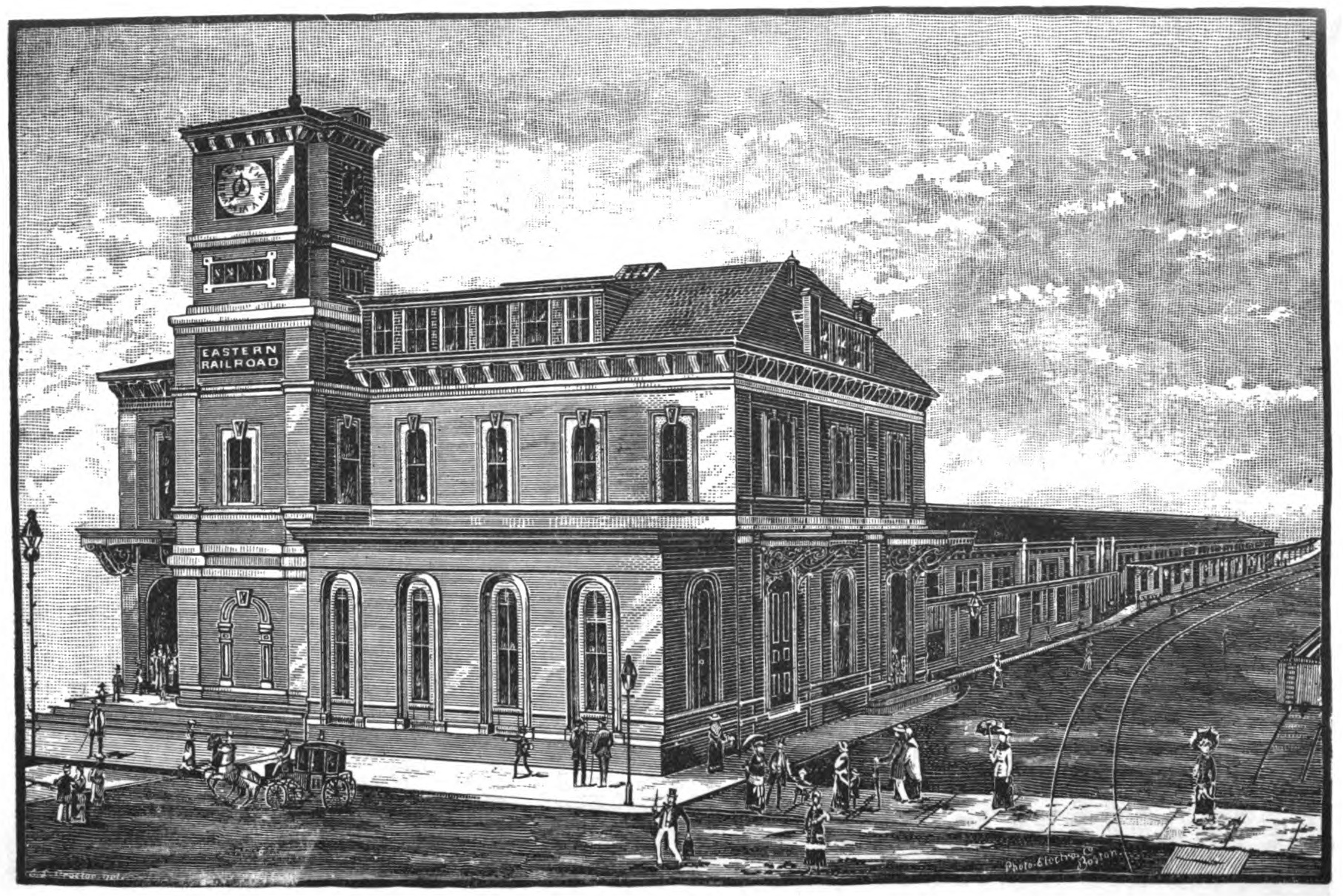
- Eastern Railroad Depot, Causeway Street, Boston, in 1883

Overview
- Headquarters: Boston, Massachusetts
- Locale: New England
- Dates of operation: 1836–1884
- Successor: Boston and Maine Railroad

The Eastern Railroad was a railroad connecting Boston, Massachusetts to Portland, Maine. Throughout its history, it competed with the Boston and Maine Railroad for service between the two cities, until the Boston & Maine put an end to the competition by leasing the Eastern in December 1884. Much of the railroad's main line in Massachusetts is used by the MBTA's Newburyport/Rockport commuter rail line, and some unused parts of its right-of-way have been converted to rail trails.

== Origins and construction ==
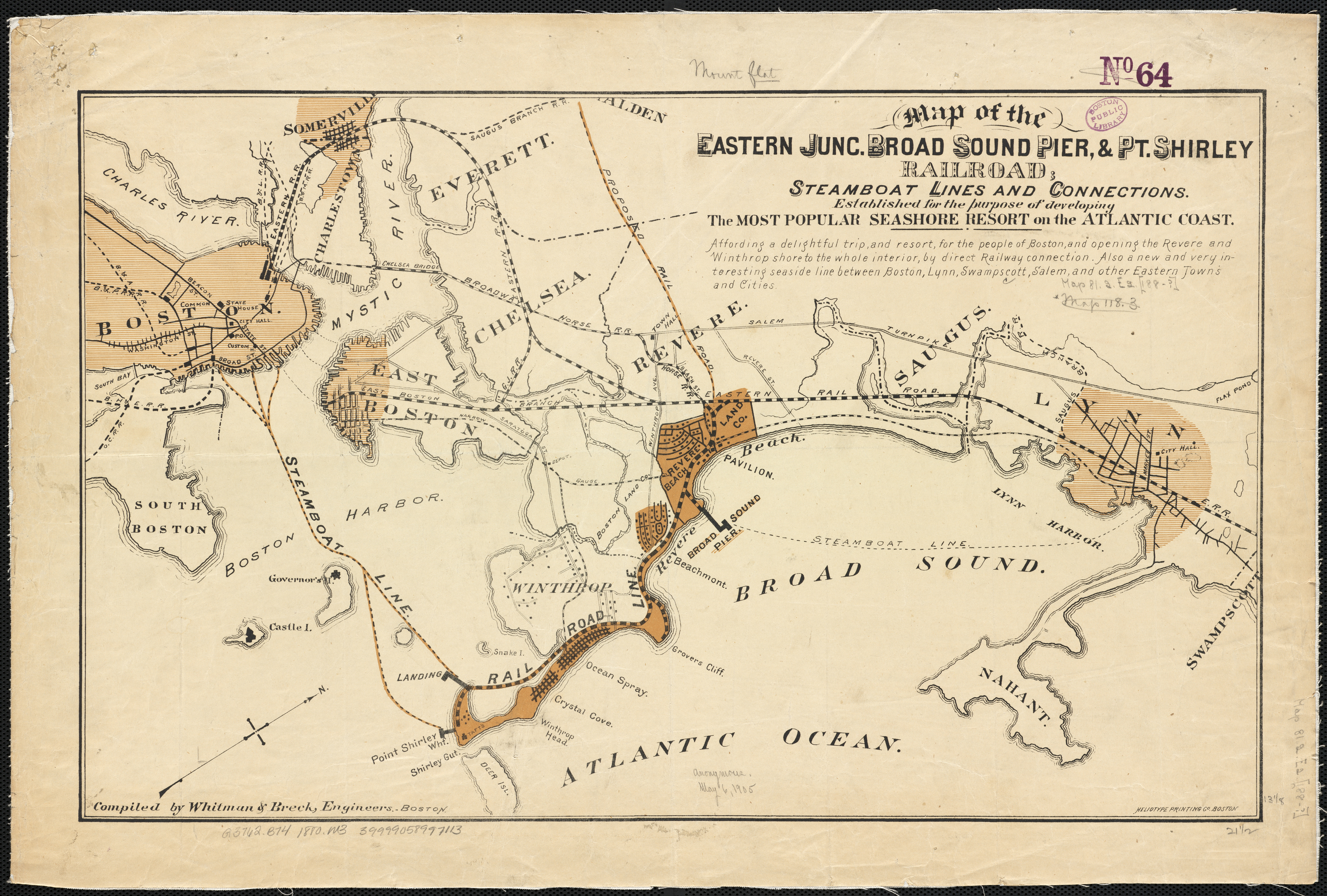
1880 plan for the Eastern Junction, Broad Sound Pier, and Point Shirley Railroad. This map shows Eastern's tracks from Lynn into East Boston, as well as the Grand Junction tracks from East Boston to downtown Boston and the Chelsea cut-off between the two routes.

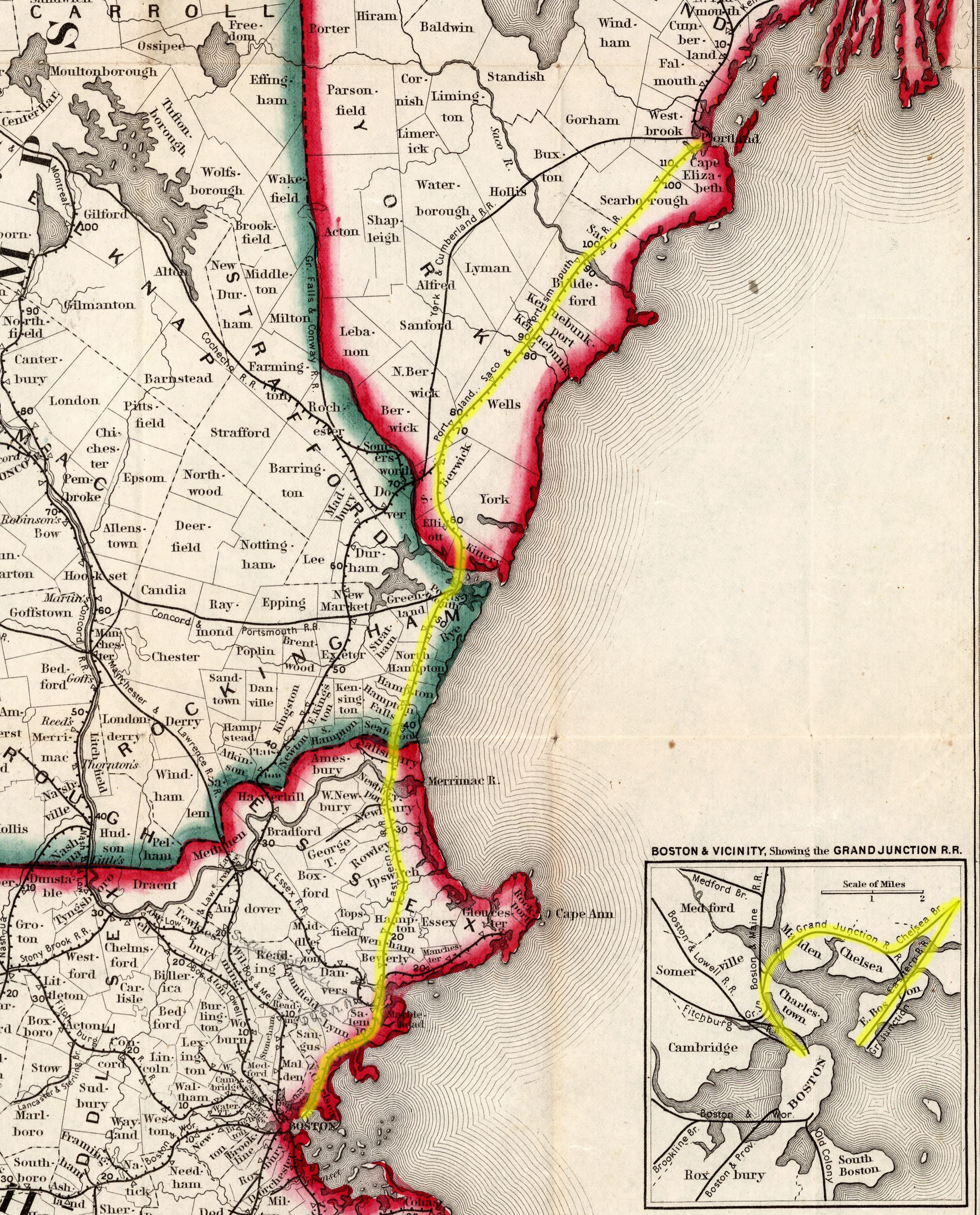
1849 railroad map, with Eastern Railroad main line highlighted in yellow

The Eastern Railroad Company of Massachusetts was first chartered on April 14, 1836. The line followed the coastline, in contrast to the Boston & Maine's inland route through Massachusetts, and it served North Shore cities such as Lynn, Salem, Beverly, and Newburyport. In keeping with its coastal route, the Eastern Railroad chose to place its Boston terminus in East Boston, a short ferry ride from downtown Boston, rather than building tracks around Chelsea Creek, the Boston Inner Harbor, and the Mystic River into the city.

Construction on the railroad began in August 1837 after state loans and a change of route were approved in April. The first stretch to be built was from East Boston to Salem (13 mi or 21 km), completed August 27, 1838. An extension to Ipswich (12 mi or 19 km) was completed on December 18, 1839, followed by an extension to Newburyport (9 mi or 14 km) on August 28, 1840, and to the New Hampshire state line (10 mi or 16 km) on November 9, 1840. A branch line to Marblehead opened on December 10, 1839, followed by a branch line to Gloucester in 1847 and a branch line to Amesbury in 1848. In 1861, the Gloucester branch was extended to Rockport. On August 31, 1846, the Eastern leased the Essex Branch Railroad for 5 years, and in 1865 it bought the branch outright.

The railroad's short segment through New Hampshire was chartered as a separate corporation by the New Hampshire legislature on June 18, 1836. Construction on the New Hampshire segment began in 1839 and was completed on November 9, 1840. On February 18, 1840 the Eastern Railroad of New Hampshire was leased to the Eastern Railroad of Massachusetts for a period of 99 years.

By 1843, the Eastern entered into an agreement with the Boston & Maine to share the Portland, Saco and Portsmouth Railroad's tracks in Maine, which allowed both railroads to begin providing Boston-to-Portland service. On April 28, 1847, the Eastern and the Boston & Maine co-leased the Portland, Saco & Portsmouth for a period of 99 years.

== Competition and decline ==
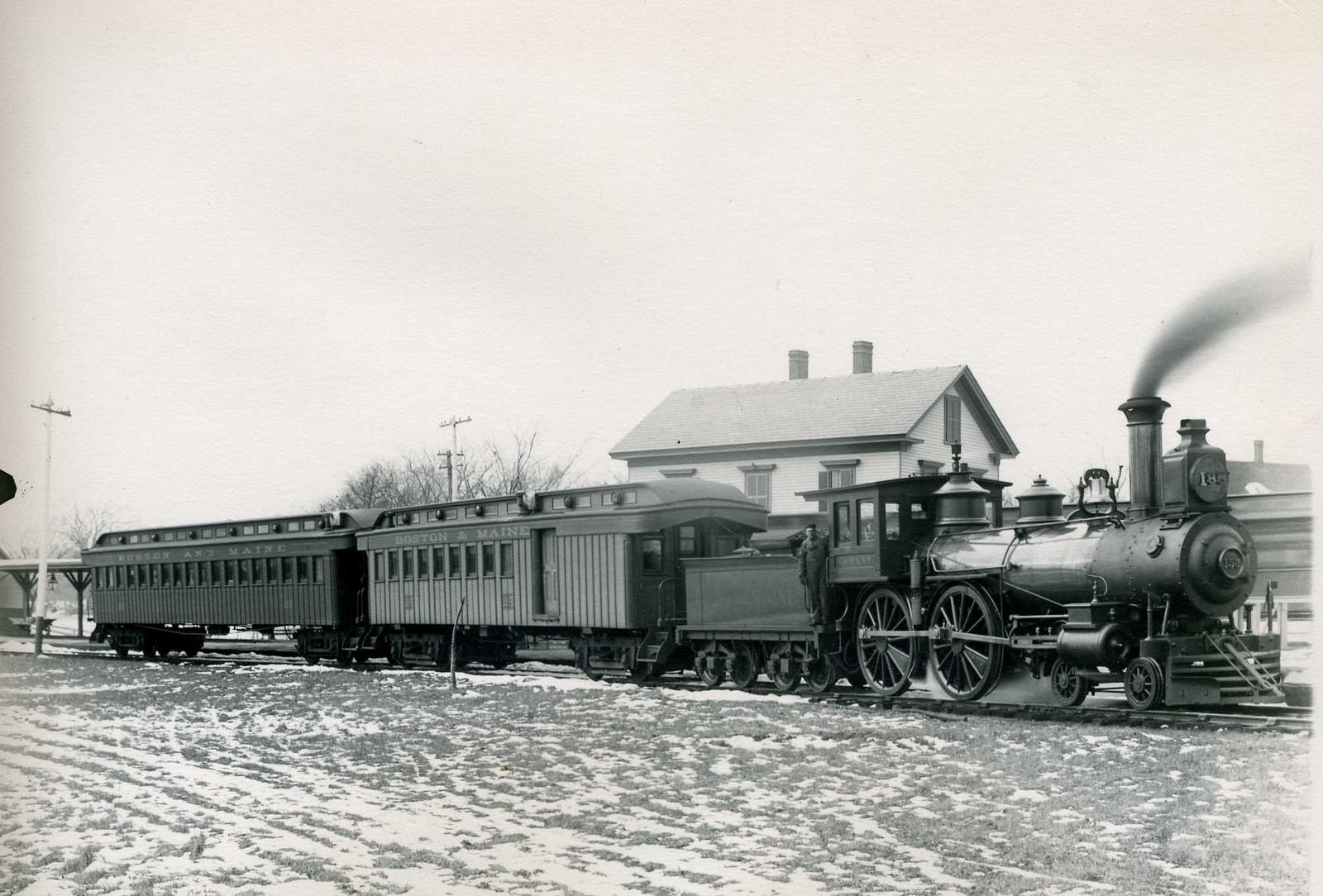
Eastern Railroad locomotive #53, operated by the Boston & Maine as the Nahant, at Wenham in January 1892

By the 1850s, the Eastern was experiencing difficulties because of the out-of-the-way location of its East Boston terminal. In 1845, the competing Boston & Maine Railroad had completed its own tracks into Boston so it would no longer have to use the Boston and Lowell Railroad's tracks. It also built a terminal in downtown Boston just north of Haymarket.

Several independent railroads sought to take advantage of the situation by building branch lines that would connect the Eastern Railroad's North Shore tracks with the Boston & Maine line going into the city. In 1850, the South Reading Branch Railroad opened, connecting the Eastern at Salem to the Boston & Maine at Wakefield, and in 1853, the Saugus Branch Railroad opened, connecting the Eastern at Lynn to the Boston & Maine at Malden. The Eastern bought the South Reading Branch Railroad in 1851 and the Saugus Branch Railroad in 1866.

The Eastern Railroad was finally able to offer service to downtown Boston when it leased the Grand Junction Railroad in 1852. The Grand Junction was a short line chartered in 1847 that connected the East Boston waterfront to the Boston & Maine, Boston & Lowell, and Fitchburg railroads in East Somerville, and it was eventually extended to connect to the Boston and Worcester Railroad in Allston. After leasing the Grand Junction, the Eastern built a cut-off from the Grand Junction to its own tracks in Chelsea and built a terminal in downtown Boston, approximately on the site of the present North Station. It also disconnected the Saugus Branch from the Boston & Maine at Medford, redirecting it south to the Grand Junction in Everett. In 1866, the Boston & Worcester bought the Grand Junction, but allowed the Eastern to keep its track rights for the sections it used as part of its main line.

In the 1870s, the Eastern expanded its service in New Hampshire. It leased the Portsmouth, Great Falls and Conway Railroad for 60 years on January 6, 1872, the Wolfeborough Railroad for 68 years on August 14, 1872, and the Portsmouth and Dover Railroad for 50 years on February 1, 1874.

On August 14, 1872, the Eastern leased the Newburyport City Railroad for 20 years. In 1872, Eastern also bought the Portland, Saco, and Portsmouth Railroad outright. In 1881, the Chelsea Beach Railroad was founded, and it was leased by the Eastern on July 2 of the same year.

On December 23, 1883, the competition between the Eastern Railroad and the Boston & Maine ended when the Boston & Maine leased the Eastern for 54 years. On May 9, 1890, the Boston & Maine purchased the Eastern outright, dissolving the company. The Boston & Maine incorporated the Eastern's tracks into its Portland Division as an alternative route to Maine and for continued service to the North Shore.

In 1893, North Station was opened in downtown Boston as a union station, consolidating under one roof the Boston terminals of four different railroads: the Eastern, the Boston & Maine, the Boston & Lowell (which was also controlled by the Boston & Maine), and the Fitchburg Railroad (which the Boston & Maine bought in 1900). And in 1905, the Grand Junction and Eastern Railroads combined their East Boston terminals.

== Incidents ==
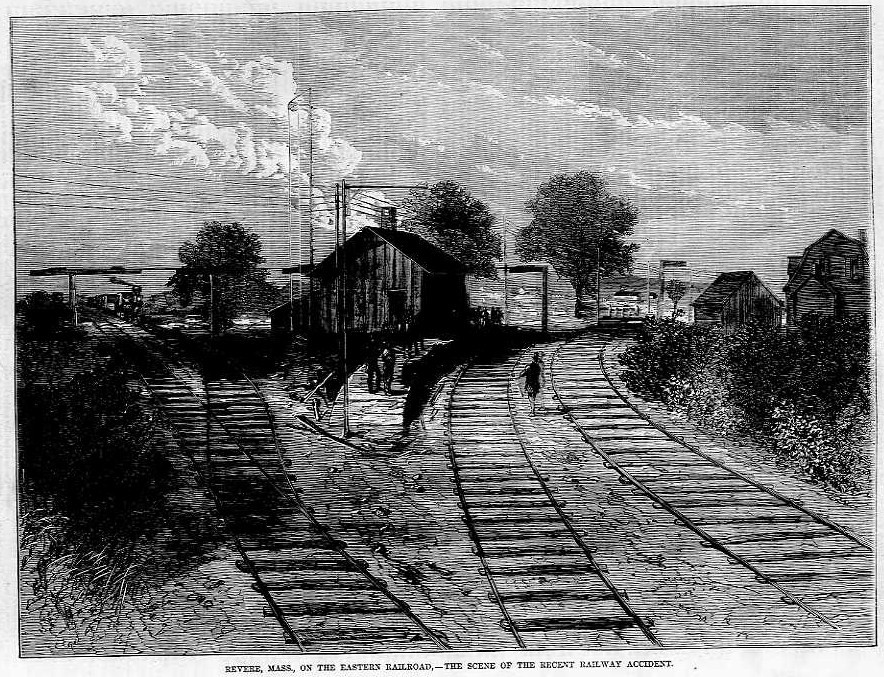
Woodcut of the Revere station, made shortly after the 1871 accident

On September 28, 1841, noted abolitionist Frederick Douglass and James N. Buffum (later mayor of Lynn) were forcibly ejected from a train at Lynn station after Douglass refused to sit in the segregated "Jim Crow car" in an early protest against the racial discrimination by the railroad. Fearing additional incidents, railroad superintendent Stephen A. Chase ordered that trains not stop at Lynn for several days. The actions by Douglass sparked further protests in Massachusetts against the discriminatory policies of the Eastern and other railroads.

On November 3, 1848, an accident occurred in Salem, Massachusetts. A southbound train heading for Marblehead missed an unattended switch and was routed onto the wrong track, into the path of a train heading north from Lynn to Salem. The two engines collided head-on. A total of 6 people were killed on the Marblehead train, and about 40 people were injured in the wreck. The Salem-bound train was carrying a party of Whigs, and the Marblehead-bound train was carrying a party of Democrats who were campaigning for the 1848 presidential election that would take place four days later.

On August 26, 1871, a series of dispatching errors allowed the Portland Express to collide with the rear of a stalled local train in Revere, telescoping the rear cars of the stopped train. Coal-oil lamps ignited the wreckage, and 29 died while 57 were injured. Several prominent Boston citizens were killed, bringing national publicity to the accident. It remains the deadliest railroad accident in Massachusetts history.

== Stations ==
=== Portland Division Eastern Mainline ===
Milepost	State	Town / City	Station	Location	Notes
0.00	MA	Boston	North Station		
1.48	MA	Somerville	East Somerville		
3.20	MA	Everett	Everett		
3.75	MA	Everett	East Everett		
4.59	MA	Chelsea	Chelsea		
5.76	MA	Chelsea	Forbes		
6.23	MA	Revere	Revere		
9.67	MA	Lynn	River Works		
10.07	MA	Lynn	West Lynn		Junction with Saugus Branch
11.61	MA	Lynn	Lynn		
12.27	MA	Lynn	East Lynn		
12.80	MA	Swampscott	Swampscott		Junction with Swampscott Branch
16.32	MA	Salem	Salem		Junction with Marblehead Branch
18.33	MA	Beverly	Beverly		
19.07	MA	Beverly	United Shoe Machinery Company		
20.84	MA	Beverly	North Beverly		
22.74	MA	Hamilton	Hamilton and Wenham		Junction with Essex Branch
27.76	MA	Ipswich	Ipswich		
31.13	MA	Rowley	Rowley		
34.44	MA	Newbury	Newbury		
37.27	MA	Newburyport	Newburyport		
39.32	MA	Salisbury	Salisbury		
41.47	NH	Seabrook	Atlantic		
42.66	NH	Seabrook	Seabrook		
44.36	NH	Hampton Falls	Hampton Falls		
46.52	NH	Hampton	Hampton		
48.69	NH	North Hampton	North Hampton		
51.40	NH	Greenland	Breakfast Hill		
56.91	NH	Portsmouth	Portsmouth		
57.70	ME	Kittery	Kittery Junction		Junction with York Harbor and Beach Railroad Company
63.23	ME	Eliot	Eliot		
67.45	ME	South Berwick	Jewett		
69.94	ME	South Berwick	Agamenticus		
74.68	ME	North Berwick	North Berwick		
79.93	ME	Wells	Highpine		
82.39	ME	Wells	Chicks		
85.18	ME	Kennebunk	West Kennebunk		
93.63	ME	Biddeford	Biddeford		
94.83	ME	Saco	Saco		
100.12	ME	Scarborough	West Scarboro		
102.65	ME	Scarborough	Oak Hill		
104.84	ME	Scarborough	Rigby		Junction with Portland Western Division Mainline
108.46	ME	Portland	Portland		

== Current status ==
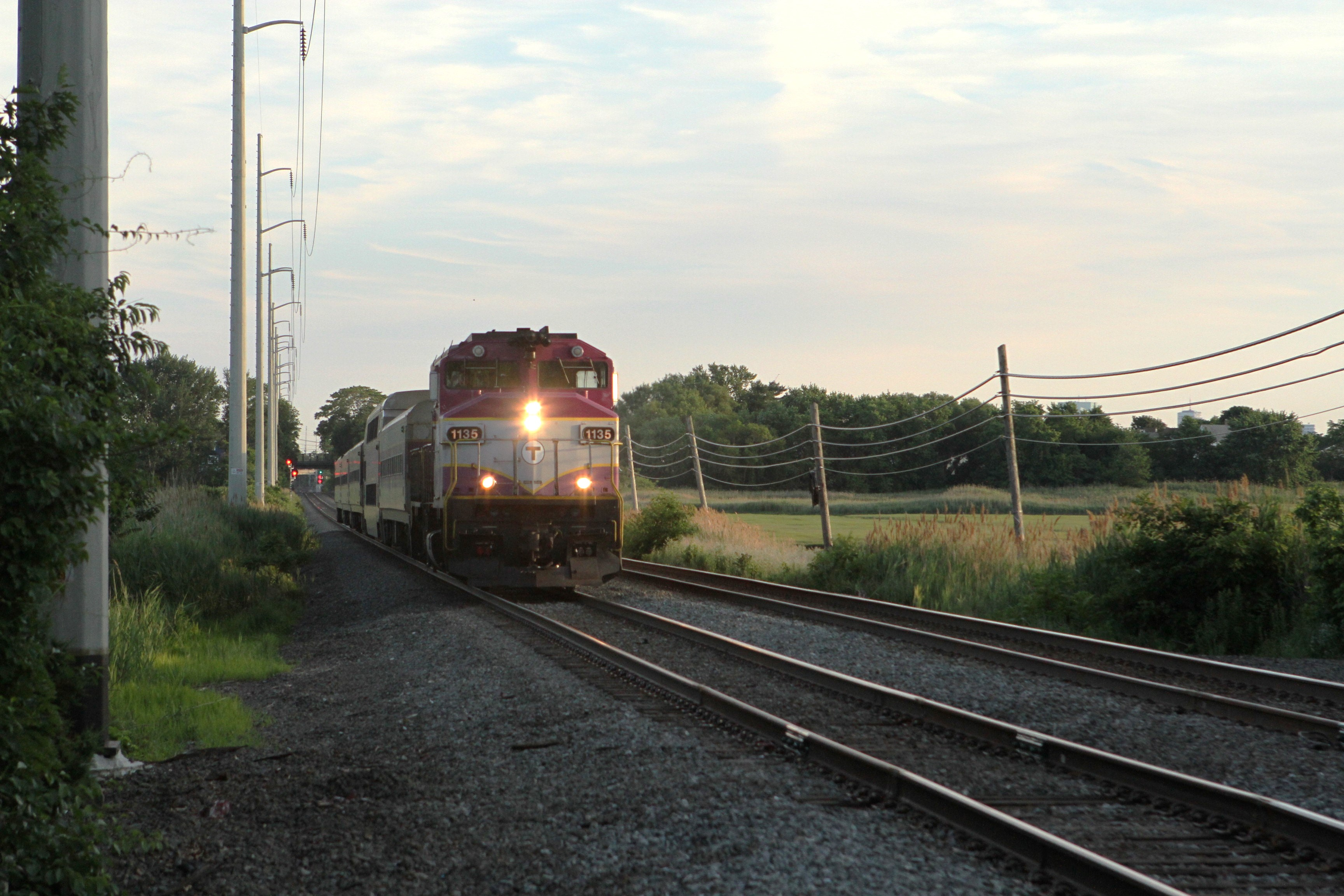
MBTA train on the Eastern Route in 2022

In 1976, the Massachusetts Bay Transportation Authority (MBTA) acquired most of the B&M's lines in eastern Massachusetts. This included the Eastern Railroad's main line (the Eastern Route) between Boston and the New Hampshire border, the Gloucester Branch, and the Saugus Branch. The Eastern Route (between Boston and southern Newburyport) and the Gloucester Branch are used by the Newburyport/Rockport Line of the MBTA Commuter Rail system.

Portions of the former Portsmouth, Great Falls and Conway Railroad, once operated by the Eastern Railroad and later run as the Conway Branch of the Boston & Maine, are in active service as the heritage Conway Scenic Railroad.

Some unused parts of the former Eastern Railroad have been converted into rail trails, including the Eastern Trail in Maine, the Clipper City Rail Trail in Newburyport, the Marblehead Rail Trail in Marblehead, and the Old Eastern Marsh Rail Trail in Salisbury, Massachusetts. In August 2019, New Hampshire purchased 9.6 miles (15.4 km) from Hampton to Portsmouth for $5 million for use as a rail trail, which opened in 2024. The Newburyport City Branch between Parker Street and Water Street, abandoned in 1971, was converted to Phase II of the Clipper City Rail Trail in 2019. In July 2020, the state awarded $100,000 for construction of an additional 1,200-foot (370 m) section north of Water Street.
