= Winchester Highlands station =

Former railway station in Massachusetts, US

Winchester Highlands
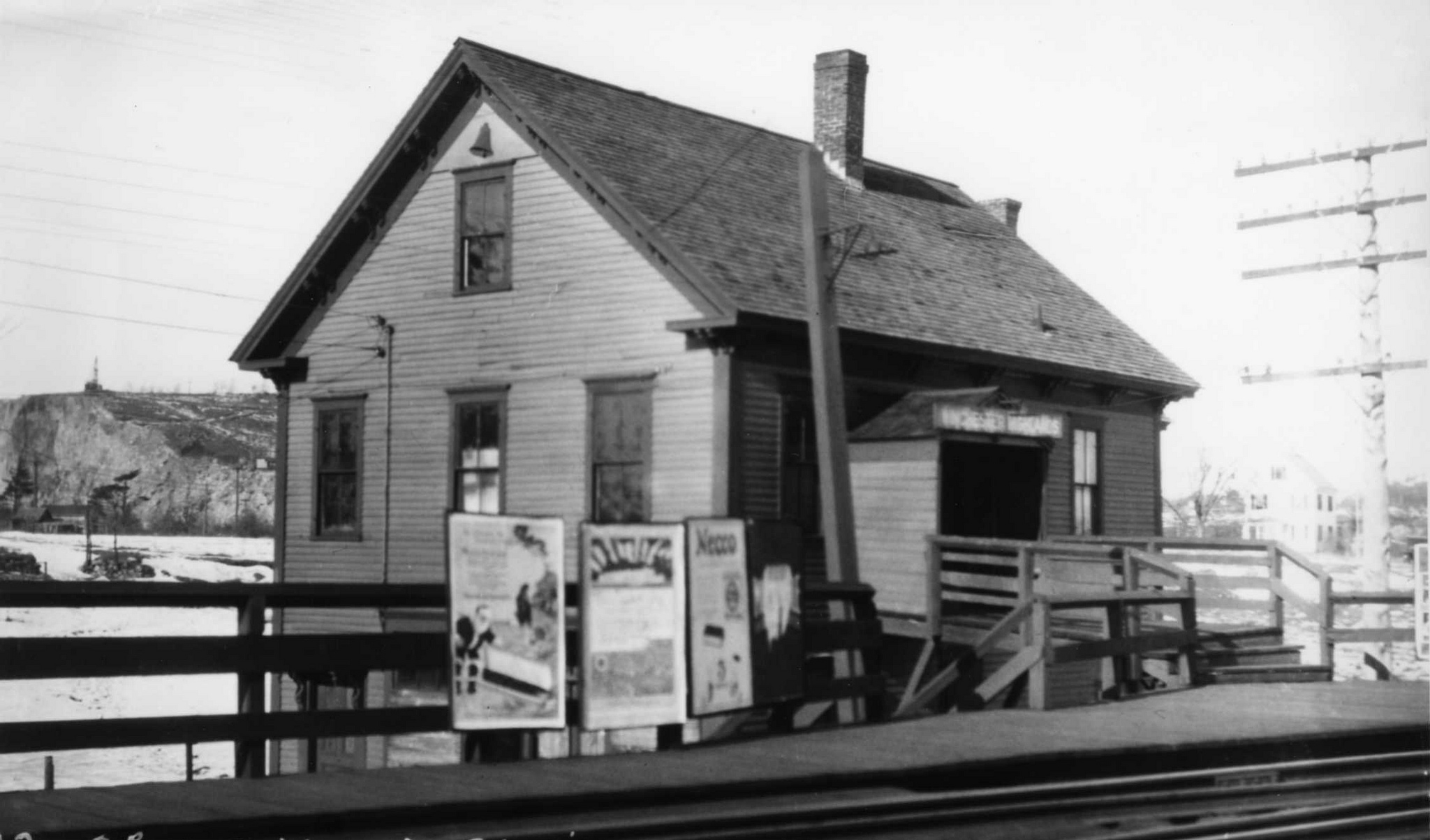
- Winchester Highlands station around 1915

General information
- Location: Cross Street, Winchester, Massachusetts
- Coordinates: 42.46772°N 71.13154°W
- Line: New Hampshire Main Line
- Platforms: 1 side platform
- Tracks: 2

History
- Opened: Before 1864
- Closed: May 30, 1978
- Rebuilt: 1877, 1943
- Former names: North Winchester

Passengers
- 1972: 13 daily boardings

Former services
Preceding station	MBTA	Following station
Wilmington toward Lowell	Lowell Line limited service	Winchester Center toward North Station
Preceding station	Boston and Maine Railroad	Following station
Montvale toward Concord, NH	Boston – Concord, NH	Winchester toward Boston
Location

Winchester Highlands station was an MBTA Commuter Rail Lowell Line station located at Cross Street in the northern part of Winchester, Massachusetts. It originally opened in the mid-19th century under the Boston and Lowell Railroad (B&L) as a flag stop called North Winchester. In 1877, a local real estate developer constructed a new station building, which was renamed Winchester Highlands. The B&L became part of the Boston and Maine Railroad (B&M) in 1887. Service to the station gradually decreased in the 20th century, and the depot was replaced by a wooden shelter around 1943. The Massachusetts Bay Transportation Authority (MBTA) began subsidizing service on the line in 1965. Winchester Highlands and two other stations with low ridership were closed by the MBTA in May 1978.

== History ==
=== Boston and Lowell Railroad ===
The Boston and Lowell Railroad (B&L) opened between its namesake cities in 1835. Most intermediate stations were added by 1850, though some were added later when demand arose. North Winchester station, a flag stop with a smaller wooden shelter, was opened by 1864. North Winchester was a tiny village with just 14 houses at that time, and the station was not always listed in timetables. The shelter was on the west side of the tracks just south of Cross Street.

In the 1870s, residents of Winchester Highlands petitioned the B&L for a new station building, but the railroad was not willing to bear the cost. Aaron C. Bell, a local real estate developer, constructed a two-story house on the west side of the tracks north of Cross Street. The upper level served as the station (as the tracks were on an embankment); the lower level housed the station agent and his family. The station was built on land belonging to Eli Cooper, who had been the engineer of the first train to run on the B&L. It was believed to be the only privately owned railroad station on the line.

Bell affixed a gilded wooden bell emblem engraved with the 1877 construction date to the station. It was dedicated on December 31, 1877, at which time the station was renamed as Winchester Highlands. Despite the name change, the station was still commonly known as North Winchester into the 1880s. A church prayer group (which later became the Second Congregational Church of Winchester) held meetings in the station from 1881 until their own chapel was completed in 1887. The original shelter was extant until at least 1889.

=== Boston and Maine Railroad ===
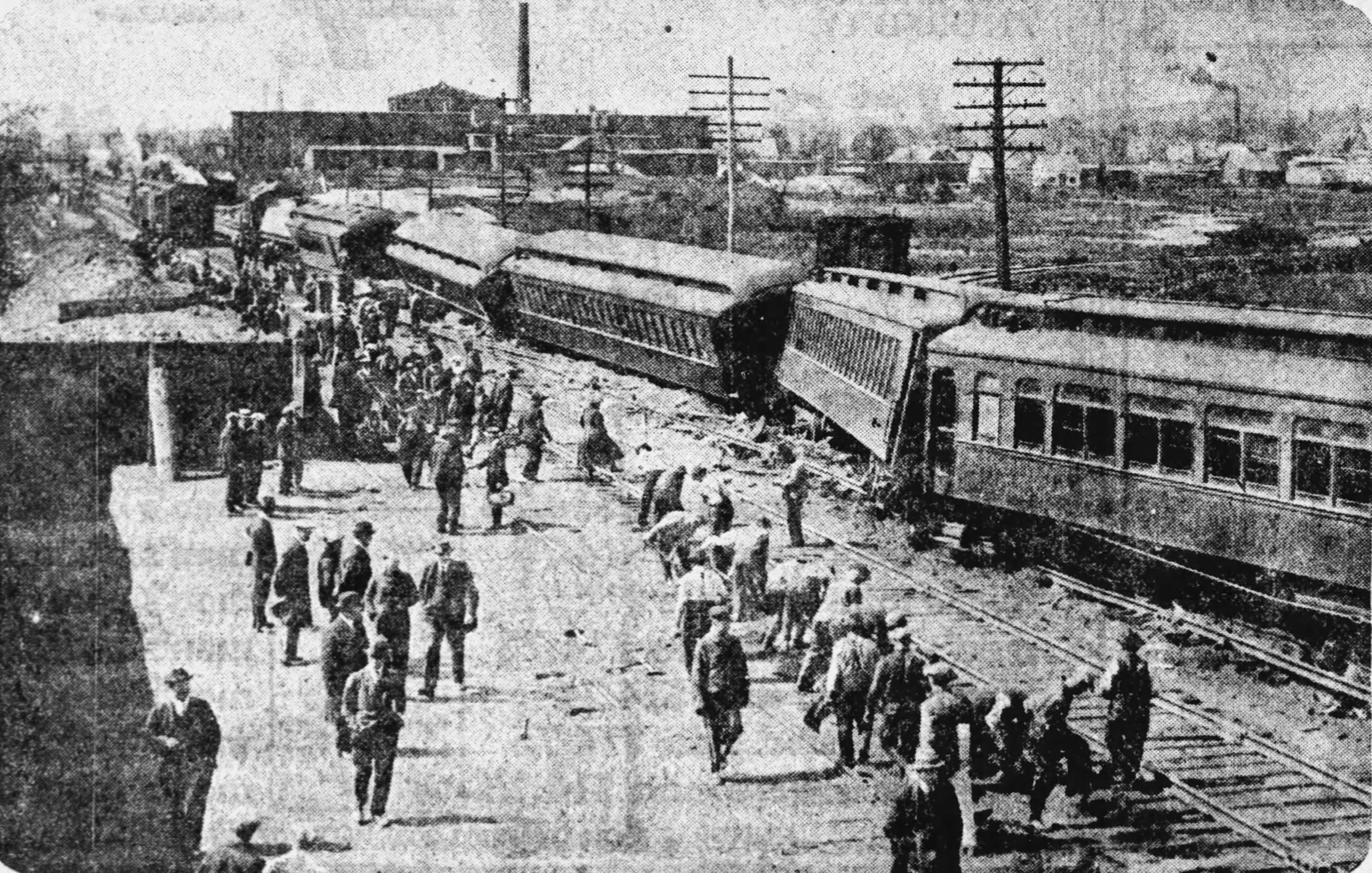
The aftermath of the 1923 derailment

The B&L became part of the Boston and Maine Railroad (B&M) in 1887 as its Southern Division. Most local service was routed over the nearby Woburn Loop after its 1885 completion, so Winchester Highlands station only saw limited service. It was served by six daily round trips in 1917 (mostly peak-hour Stoneham Branch and Wilmington locals), with a slight reduction by 1929. Twenty-four passengers were injured when a southbound train from Concord derailed near the station on May 23, 1923. The train's consist of newer steel cars, rather than older wooden cars, was credited with preventing deaths.

The bell was torn off the building by a storm in January 1935. It was brought to the office of a local newspaper, and later presented to the Winchester Historical Society. The bridge over Cross Street adjacent to the station was rebuilt in 1939. The station building was replaced with a small shelter around 1943 to reduce the B&M tax bill. The old building was demolished. Stoneham Branch service ended on May 18, 1958, after which Winchester Highlands was served by Lowell trains. Service continued to decline during the mid-20th century: 4 round trips in 1946, 2 1/2 in 1952 (two southbound trains and three northbound trains), and 1 1/2 in 1957.

=== MBTA ===
The B&M sold the Winchester Highlands station lot, as well as the Winchester and Wedgemere station buildings, in 1964. The Massachusetts Bay Transportation Authority (MBTA) was created that year to subsidize suburban commuter rail service. Subsidies for a number of B&M lines, including the Southern Division service as far as Wilmington, began on January 18, 1965. Subsidies for all Lowell service began on June 28; it became the Lowell Line of the MBTA Commuter Rail system. In 1967, the MBTA proposed to modernize Winchester Highlands as a park and ride facility.

Cross Street station had just 13 daily boardings in a 1972 count; all walked to the station, as no parking was available. By that time, only a single inbound trip and two outbound trips were scheduled to stop at Winchester Highlands. In July 1976, the MBTA removed the deteriorated outbound platform and stairs. The agency warned that unless the town paid to repair the station – a cost estimated at $12,125 (equivalent to $52,000 in 2024) – the station might be closed. Outbound trains ceased to stop later that year, leaving just the single inbound stop.

The B&M commuter rail assets were purchased by the MBTA on December 27, 1976. The peak-hour-only stops at Winchester Highlands on the Lowell Line plus Clematis Brook and Beaver Brook on the South Acton Line were discontinued on May 30, 1978, due to low ridership. At the time, all three stations had three or fewer boardings per day. The shelter built in 1943 is no longer extant.
