= Lechmere Warehouse station =

Former train station in Woburn, Massachusetts

Lechmere Warehouse
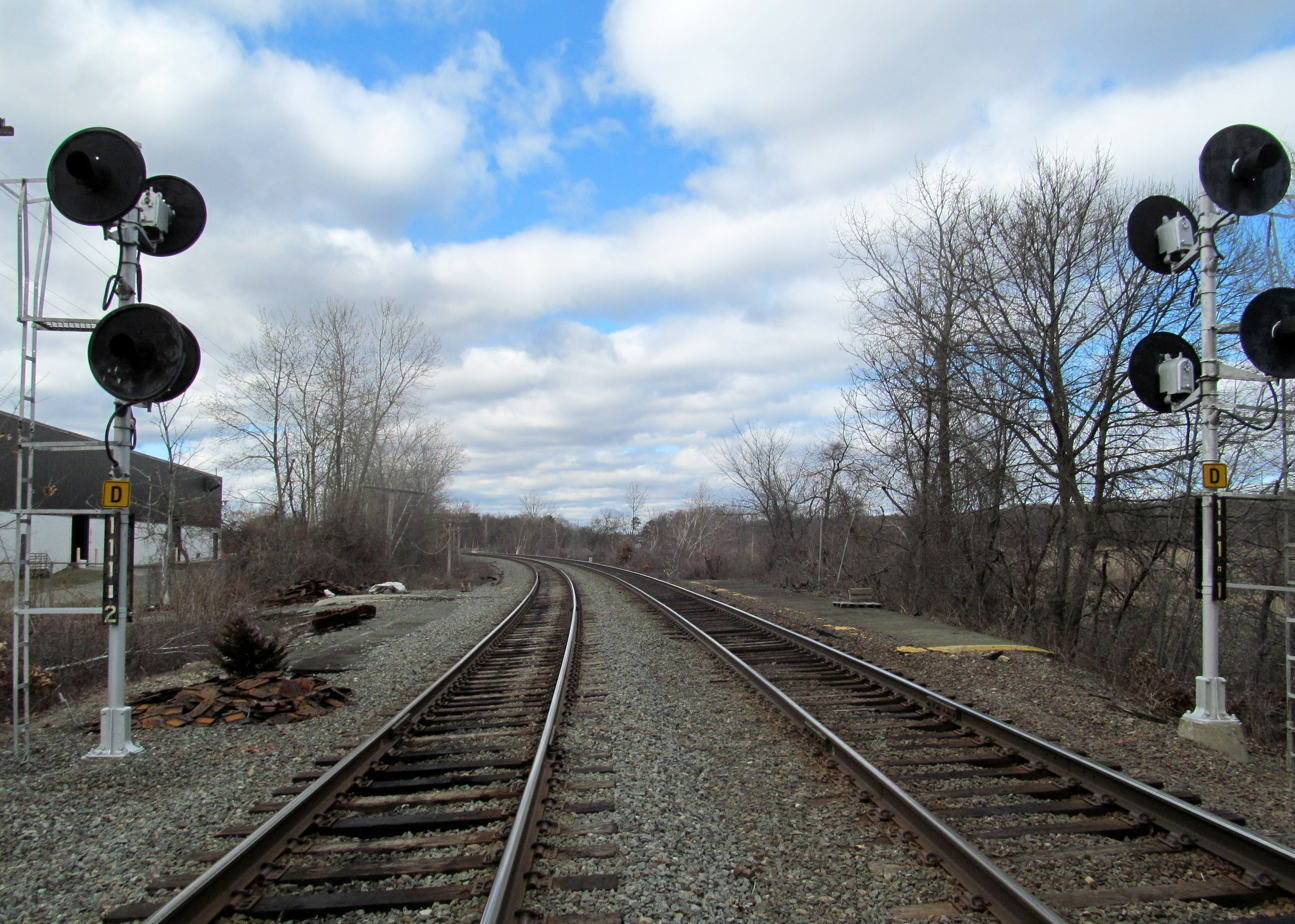
- The abandoned platforms of the station in 2017

General information
- Location: 225 Wildwood Avenue; Woburn, Massachusetts
- Coordinates: 42.49312°N 71.13333°W
- Line: New Hampshire Main Line
- Platforms: 2 side platforms
- Tracks: 2

History
- Opened: 1979
- Closed: c.1997

Passengers
- 1983: 17 daily

Former services
Preceding station	MBTA	Following station
Winchester Center toward Lowell	Lowell Line limited service	Mishawum toward Lowell
Location

Lechmere Warehouse was a railroad stop in Woburn, Massachusetts. It served the Lowell Line of the MBTA Commuter Rail system. The station, located in northwestern Woburn away from the residential areas, primarily served reverse commuters working at the adjacent warehouse of the Lechmere department store. It was a flag stop, with certain northbound stops during the morning rush and southbound trains during the evening rush stopping on request.

== History ==
The station opened in 1979 and consisted of two low platforms about 60 feet (18 m) long serving the line's two tracks. The station was never heavily used; in 1983, it had just 17 daily riders. The stop was discontinued circa 1997, when the Lechmere stores closed as parent company Montgomery Ward underwent bankruptcy. The platforms are still extant.
