= West Medford station =

Railway station in Medford, Massachusetts

West Medford
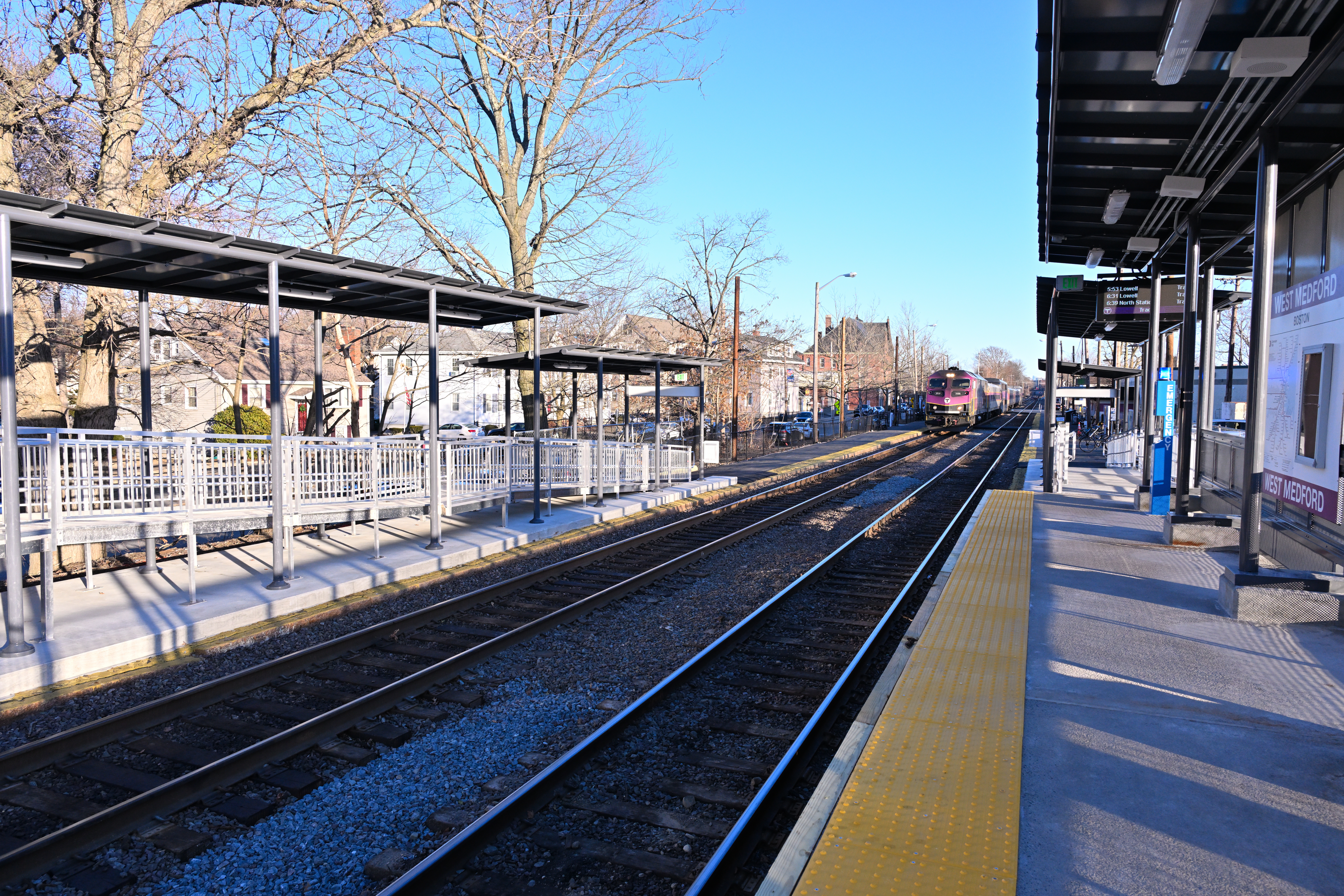
- An outbound train arriving at West Medford in 2025

General information
- Location: 481 High Street; Medford, Massachusetts
- Coordinates: 42.4218°N 71.13332°W
- Line: New Hampshire Main Line
- Platforms: 2 side platforms
- Tracks: 2
- Connections: MBTA bus: 94, 95

Construction
- Parking: 30 spaces
- Accessible: Yes

Other information
- Fare zone: 1A

Passengers
- 2024: 415 daily boardings

Services
Preceding station	MBTA	Following station
Wedgemere toward Lowell	Lowell Line	North Station Terminus
Former services
Preceding station	MBTA	Following station
Wedgemere toward Haverhill	Haverhill Line Limited service	North Station Terminus
Preceding station	Boston and Maine Railroad	Following station
Wedgemere toward Concord, NH	Boston – Concord, NH	Medford Hillside toward Boston
Location

West Medford station is an MBTA Commuter Rail station located at West Medford Square in Medford, Massachusetts. It is served by the Lowell Line. The station has low-level platforms with mini-high platforms for accessibility.

== History ==
=== Early history ===
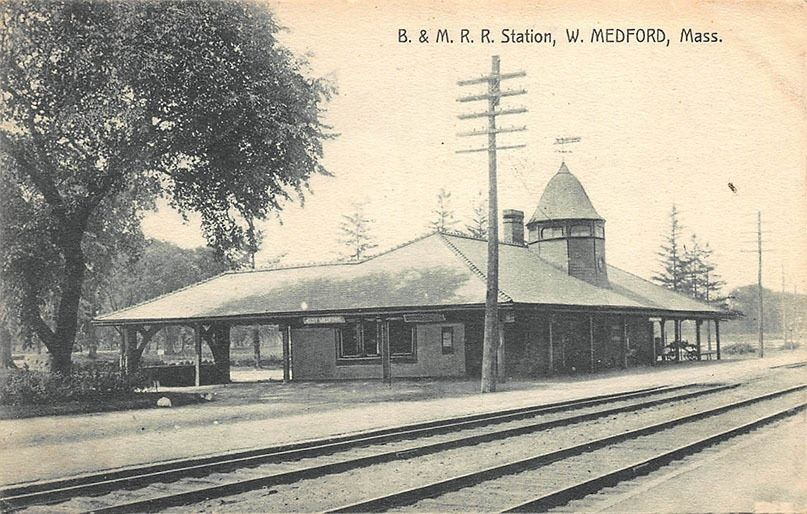
West Medford station in 1909

When the original Boston and Lowell Railroad (B&L) was laid out in the 1830s, West Medford was mostly farmland. The route of the new railroad (one of the oldest railroads in North America) was built on land acquired from Peter Chardon Brooks, who sold a strip for the right-of-way plus a parcel for the station on High Street. Medford Gates station was open by 1838. The name reflected the large gates built to warn passerby about the grade crossing. The Boston and Maine Railroad (B&M) opened its Medford branch to Medford Square in 1847; the B&L station was renamed West Medford in the early 1850s. A new station building was constructed in 1854.

The adjacent High Street grade crossing, and the Canal Street crossing 0.2 miles (0.32 km) southeast, are the only grade crossings on the line south of Wilmington. Elimination of the High Street crossing was considered in 1932, but not implemented. The depot structure, built in 1886, was demolished in the 1960s. The decorative weathervane from the roof of the station was acquired by the Henry Ford Museum in Dearborn, Michigan in the 1950s.

=== MBTA era ===
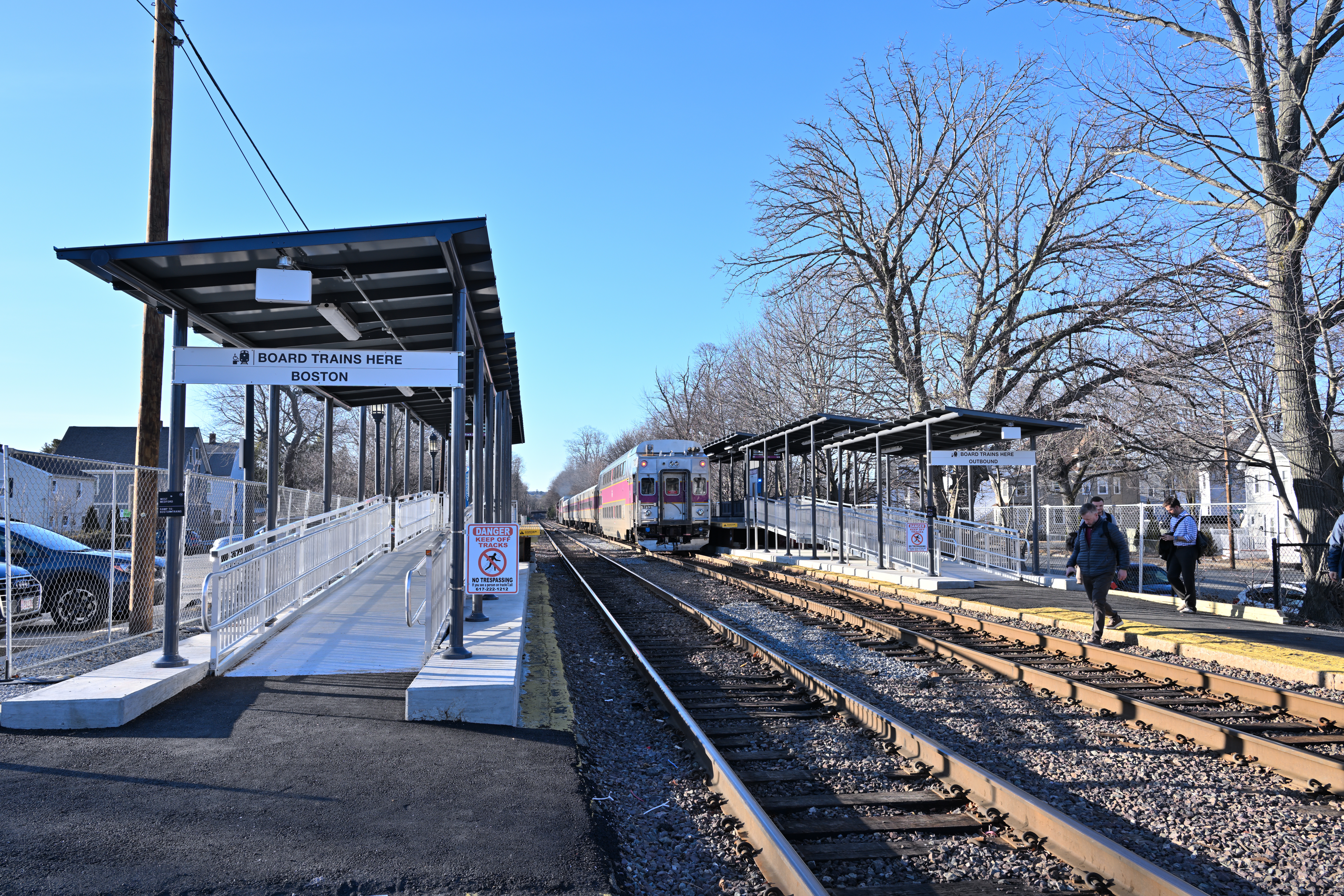
Accessible mini-high platforms that opened in March 2025

Until December 2020, a small number of Haverhill Line trains ran via the Wildcat Branch and the inner Lowell Line, making stops including West Medford. This routing was resumed in April 2021, with the trains no longer making the intermediate stops. Until May 2023, West Medford and Wedgemere were flag stops outside of weekday peak hours. Effective May 22, 2023, they were made regular scheduled stops at all times.

In 2019, the MBTA listed West Medford as a "Tier I" accessibility priority. In 2024, the MBTA tested a temporary freestanding accessible platform design at Beverly Depot. These platforms do not require alterations to the existing platforms, thus skirting federal rules requiring full accessibility renovations when stations are modified, and were intended to provide interim accessibility at lower cost pending full reconstruction. West Medford was one of the first four non-accessible stations to be modified with the temporary platforms, with construction beginning in 2024. The mini-high platforms opened on March 10, 2025.
