= Winchester Center station =

Train station in Winchester, Massachusetts, US

Winchester Center
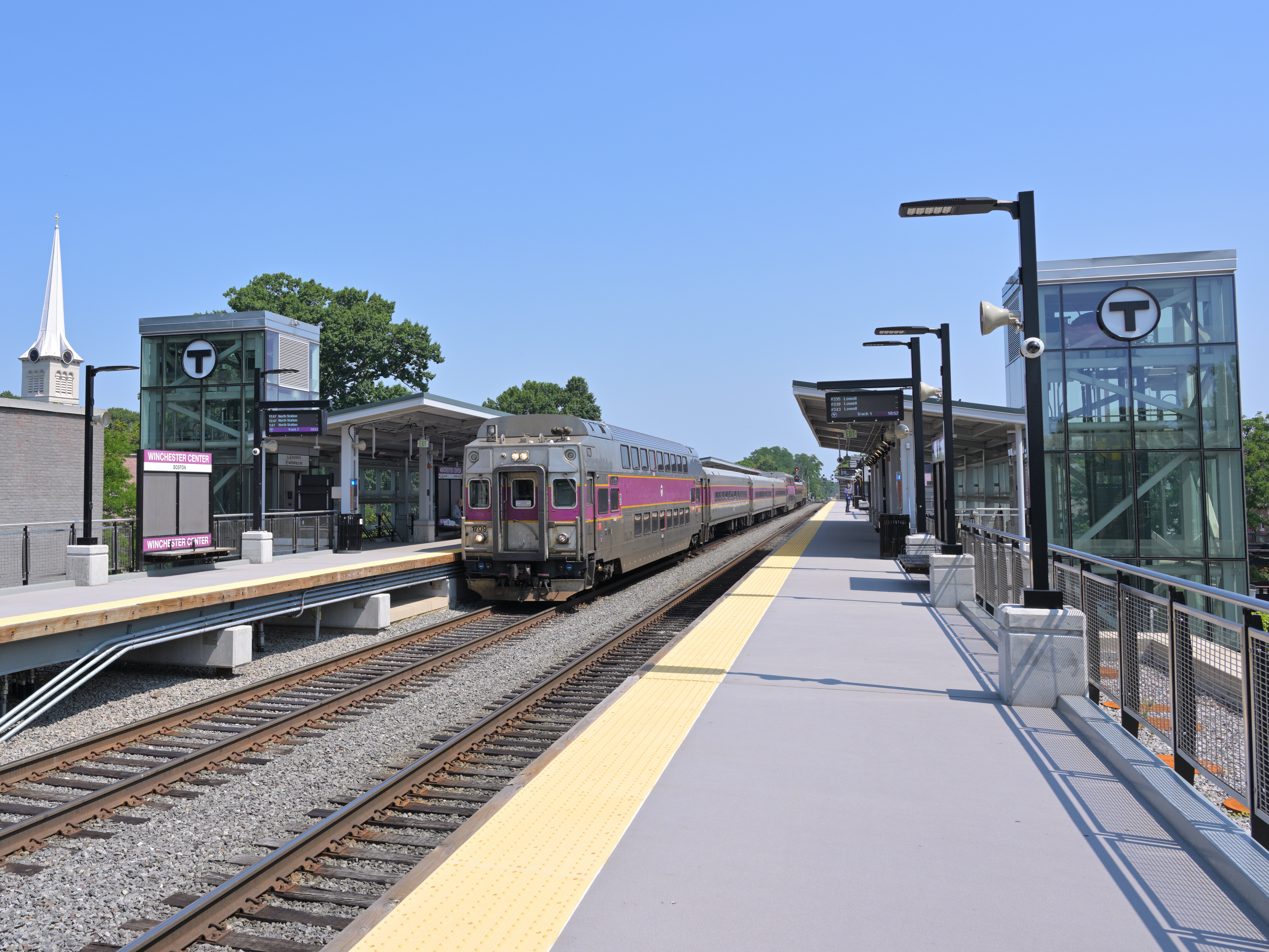
- An inbound train at the station in 2026

General information
- Location: 29 Waterfield Road; Winchester, Massachusetts
- Coordinates: 42.4516°N 71.1378°W
- Line: New Hampshire Main Line
- Platforms: 2 side platforms
- Tracks: 2
- Connections: MBTA bus: 134

Construction
- Parking: 237 spaces (town permit required)
- Cycle facilities: 27 spaces
- Accessible: Yes

Other information
- Fare zone: 1

History
- Opened: c. 1835–1838
- Rebuilt: 1955–1957; December 2021–June 2025

Passengers
- 2024: 115 daily boardings

Services
Preceding station	MBTA	Following station
Mishawum toward Lowell	Lowell Line	Wedgemere toward North Station
Former services
Preceding station	MBTA	Following station
Anderson/Woburn toward Haverhill	Haverhill Line limited service, pre-2020	Wedgemere toward North Station
Cross Street closed 1981 toward Woburn	Lowell Line Woburn Branch	Wedgemere toward North Station
Preceding station	Boston and Maine Railroad	Following station
Winchester Highlands via mainline toward Concord, NH	Boston – Concord, NH	Wedgemere toward Boston
Cross Street via Woburn Loop toward Concord, NH	Boston – Concord, NH	Wedgemere toward Boston
Location

Winchester Center station is a MBTA Commuter Rail station in Winchester, Massachusetts, served by the Lowell Line. The station is located on a viaduct in downtown Winchester, with two accessible side platforms serving the line's two tracks. The station was temporarily closed on January 8, 2021 due to structural deterioration. The first portion of the rebuilt station opened on October 1, 2024, while the remaining portion opened on June 3, 2025.

== History ==
=== Early history ===
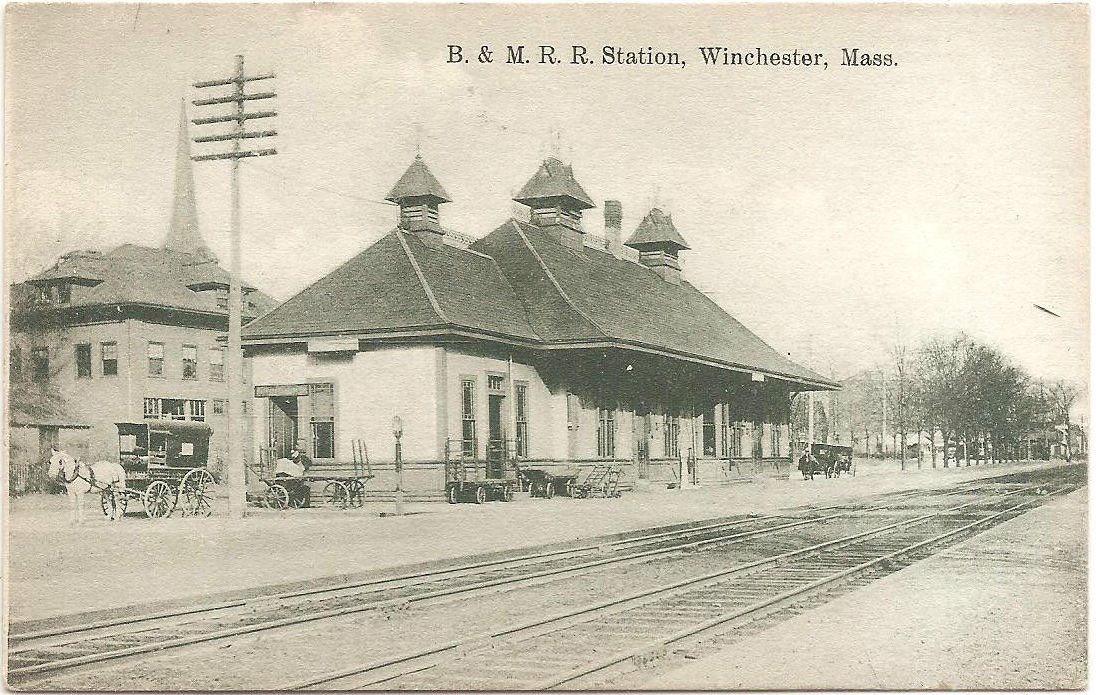
Circa-1910 postcard of Winchester station

The Boston and Lowell Railroad opened between its namesake cities in 1835; local stops were added soon after. Woburn Gates station – later Winchester – was open by 1838. By the 1840s, service on the line was suitable for commuting to Boston. Elimination of the grade crossing at Winchester was considered in 1903 and 1906, and again in 1915. The 1915 proposal called for the tracks to be lowered by 4 feet (1.2 m) and the streets to be raised by 17 feet (5.2 m). The B&M installed bike racks at the station in 1942 in an effort to reduce parking needs.

In the early 1950s, the B&M began planning a project to raise the tracks of the New Hampshire Main Line and the southern end of the Woburn Branch for a mile through Winchester, eliminating troublesome grade crossings downtown. Construction began in 1955; boxy two-story brick stations opened at Wedgemere and Winchester Center in 1957.

Until 1981, the Woburn Branch diverged from the main line just north of the Winchester Center platforms. A short stub is still in place.

=== Repair work ===
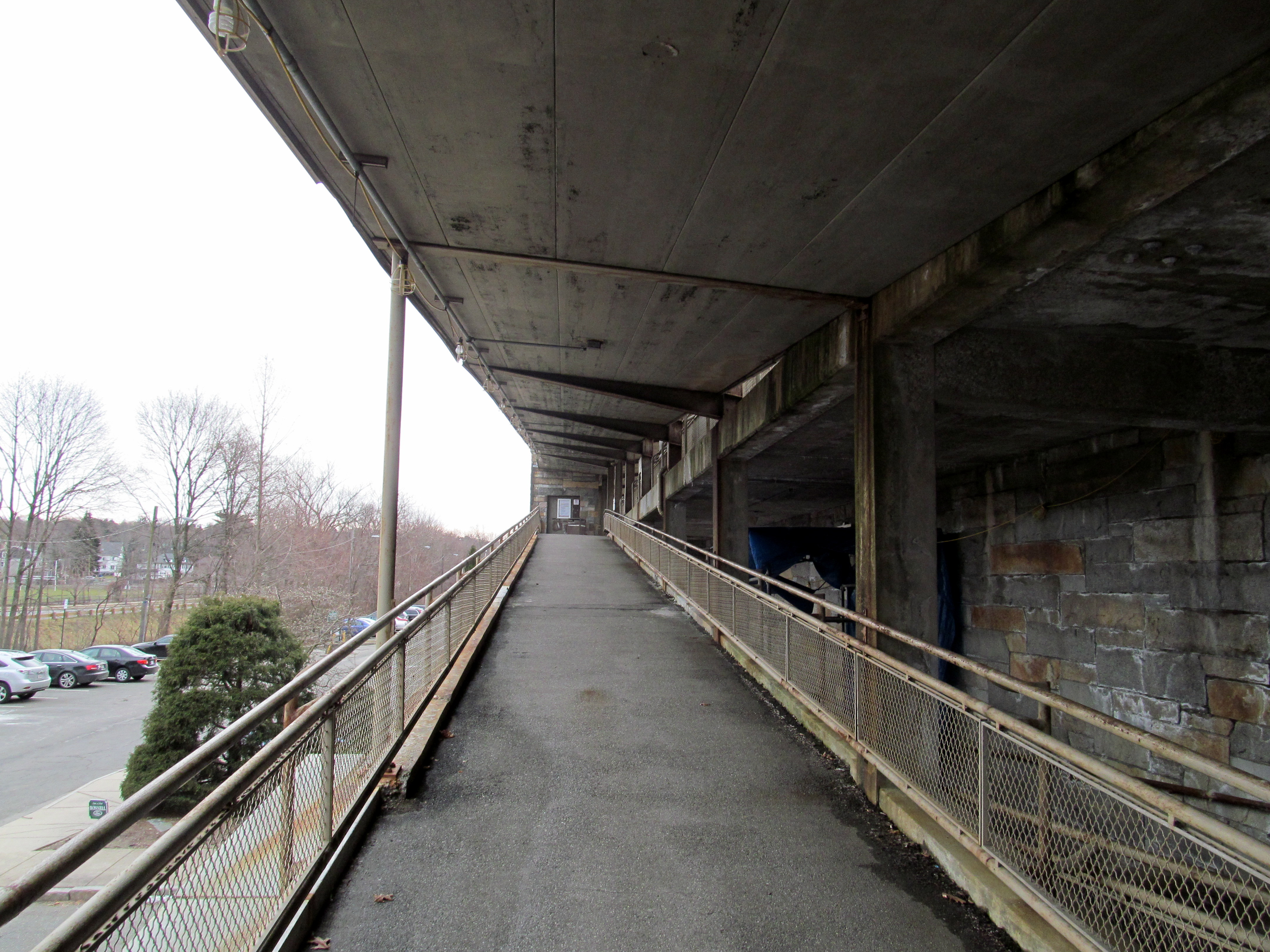
One of the ramps to the inbound platform in January 2013, showing water damage to concrete and metal structures

Winchester Center station had not been substantially renovated since the viaduct was completed in 1957. In September 2008, the MBTA approved $1.4 million in platform and ramps repairs, as well as electrical and lighting work, at the station. The work was completed in 2010; the MBTA intended to renovate the station before the 5-year life of the platform patches was reached.

On July 7, 2015, the Winchester Department of Public Works discovered a hole in the inbound platform, which prompted the closure of the northern 500 feet (150 m) of the platform and one ramp due to concrete deterioration. One ramp and the remaining section of the platform remained open for service. The MBTA planned to make temporary repairs before the end of the year. Further repairs were made in 2017 to support the platforms and ramps.

Until December 2020, a small number of Haverhill Line trains ran via the Wildcat Branch and the inner Lowell Line, making stops including Winchester Center. This routing was resumed in April 2021, with the trains no longer making the intermediate stops.

=== Reconstruction ===
==== Planning ====
The MBTA made renovations to the station to repair water damage and make it fully accessible. The station design was advanced to 15% in December 2011; Jacobs Engineering was then chosen as the contractor for final design in June 2012. Funding issues prevented this design work from beginning until 2013. It was later determined that the mini-high platforms of the 15% design were not sufficient for state accessibility requirements, and that full-length high-level platforms would be required. The town objected to simply changing the design to accommodate these platforms.

After several iterations, a new 15% design was reached in December 2015. The rebuilt station will have 724-foot (221 m)-long high-level platforms; although shorter than the 800-foot (240 m) MBTA standard, they will still be able to platform 9 cars. A gauntlet track may be installed to allow CSX Transportation freight trains to pass. A new interlocking may be built south of the station, which will allow greater flexibility during construction and allow the retirement of the former Woburn Branch interlocking north of the station after completion. Although early designs called for replacement of existing ramps, the new 15% design added two redundant elevators at the southern end of each platform. The 1957-built station was originally to be demolished to make room for the elevators and staircases. The northern ramp to the outbound platform will be moved north of the adjacent rotary; the northern inbound ramp will be rebuilt at its present location south of the rotary, with the possibility of an additional ramp north of the rotary in the future.

Design of the station was then expected to be completed by the end of 2016, with the $25.8 million construction beginning in 2017. By October 2016, bidding was expected to begin that December. The MBTA designated $34 million in funding in 2016, but the projected cost rose to $54 million by 2018. By late 2019, the total project budget was $49.9 million: $7.3 million for design and $42.5 million for construction. By May 2020, the MBTA expected to begin construction in fall 2020, with completion in spring 2023. However, the project was put on hold in 2020 due to budgetary issues caused by the COVID-19 pandemic.

==== Construction ====
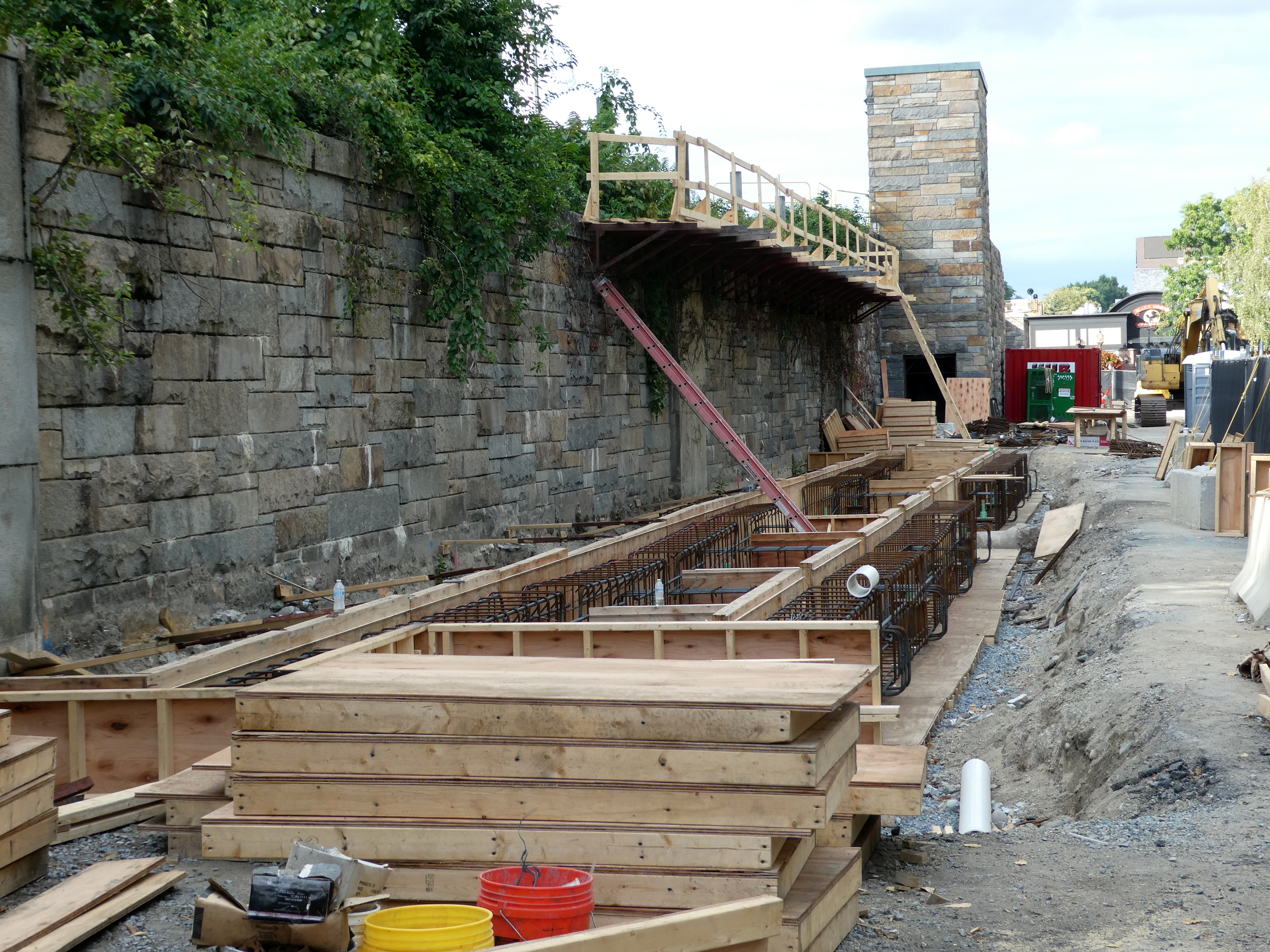
Construction of the new station in September 2022

The station was closed effective January 8, 2021 due to deterioration. On January 11, the MBTA reinstated funding for the project due to the closure. The MBTA received a demolition permit on January 25. Demolition of the ramps was completed in June 2021. A $47.6 million construction contract was approved on October 27, 2021. The 28-month construction phase began in December 2021. Site preparation began in March 2022. Demolition of the remaining platforms and ramps took place in May and June 2022. Some demolition and utility work lasted through the remainder of 2022.

A formal groundbreaking ceremony was held on June 30, 2022. Construction was 25% complete by December 2022 and 30% complete by June 2023, with completion expected in April 2024. Work was delayed by plumbing code compliance issues, supply chain issues, and reduced work windows due to a September–November 2023 diversion of Haverhill Line service over the Lowell Line. By November 2023, the new station was 40% complete. The southern portion of the new station, including 320 feet (98 m) of each platform, was expected to open in July 2024; the remaining portion was expected to open in October 2024. On March 25, 2024, weekday midday service was reduced to accommodate Winchester Center reconstruction and other construction work.

In June 2024, the schedule was delayed to a partial opening in late September and full opening in December. The first portion was planned to reopen on September 30, 2024. However, delays in the completion of the elevator work resulted in the reopening date being pushed back a day to October 1. By December 2024, construction was 80% complete. The town and the MBTA clashed in 2025 over mitigation measures, including whether the MBTA would repave a parking lot, and over extensions for a construction easement. Regular midday service on the Lowell Line resumed on June 2, 2025; the remaining portion of the platforms opened on June 3. A ribbon-cutting ceremony was held on July 16.

As of 2024, transit oriented development with 56 residential units is planned to replace the MBTA-owned and town-owned surface parking lots on the south side of Waterfield Street.
