= North Billerica station =

Train station in Billerica, Massachusetts, US

North Billerica
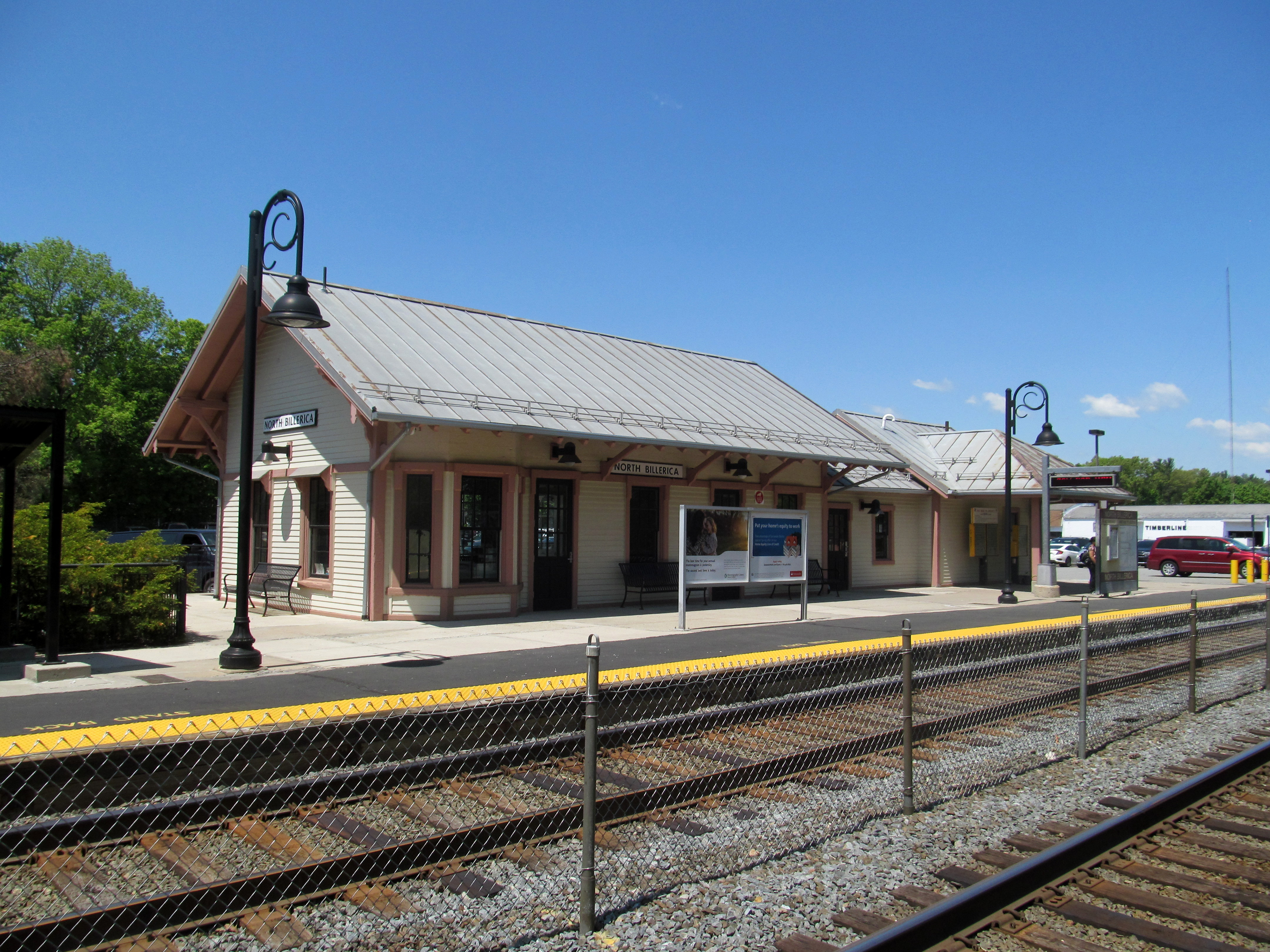
- The 1867-constructed station building at North Billerica in 2016

General information
- Location: Ruggles Street at Station Street; Billerica, Massachusetts
- Coordinates: 42.59328°N 71.28104°W
- Line: New Hampshire Route Main Line
- Platforms: 2 side platforms
- Tracks: 2
- Connections: LRTA: 3, 13

Construction
- Parking: 541 spaces ($4.00 fee)
- Cycle facilities: 14 spaces
- Accessible: Yes

Other information
- Fare zone: 5

History
- Opened: 1830s
- Rebuilt: 1867, 1998

Passengers
- 2024: 604 daily boardings

Services
Preceding station	MBTA	Following station
Lowell Terminus	Lowell Line	Wilmington toward North Station
Former services
Preceding station	Boston and Maine Railroad	Following station
South Lowell toward Concord, NH	Boston – Concord, NH	East Billerica toward Boston
South Lowell toward Lowell	Lexington Branch	Nasons toward Boston
Location

North Billerica station is an MBTA Commuter Rail station in Billerica, Massachusetts. It serves the Lowell Line, and is located in the North Billerica village. The depot building, built in 1867, was renovated, expanded, and returned to station use in 1998. The station has mini-high platforms for accessibility.

== History ==
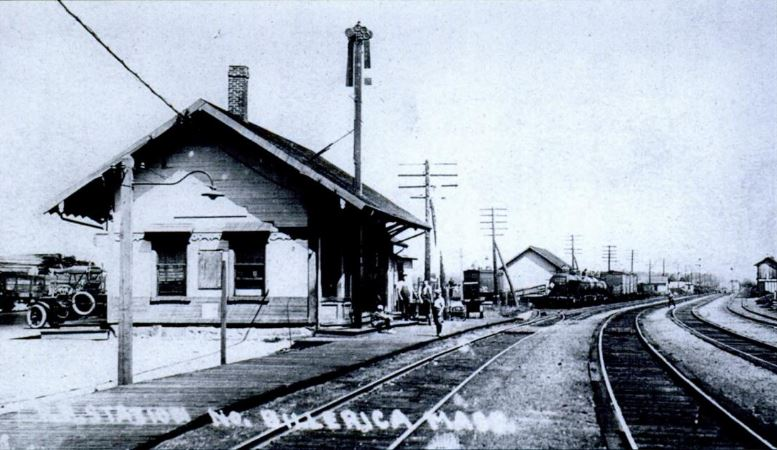
North Billerica station in 1920

Billerica Mills station – later North Billerica – was open by 1838. It served as a flag stop on the Boston and Lowell Railroad's main line and was the north terminal of the narrow gauge Billerica and Bedford Railroad (B&B). In 1998, the North Billerica Depot underwent extensive renovations as part of the Massachusetts Bay Transportation Authority's efforts to restore and expand its Billerica commuter rail stop. The new depot and train station were rededicated on October 30, 1998.

On January 23, 2015, several people were injured when the retractable edge of the outbound platform collapsed while passengers were deboarding. Both mini-high platforms were taken out of service for a number of months, with portable lifts used until the mini-high platforms were returned to service.
