= Wedgemere station =

Railway station in Winchester, Massachusetts, US

Wedgemere
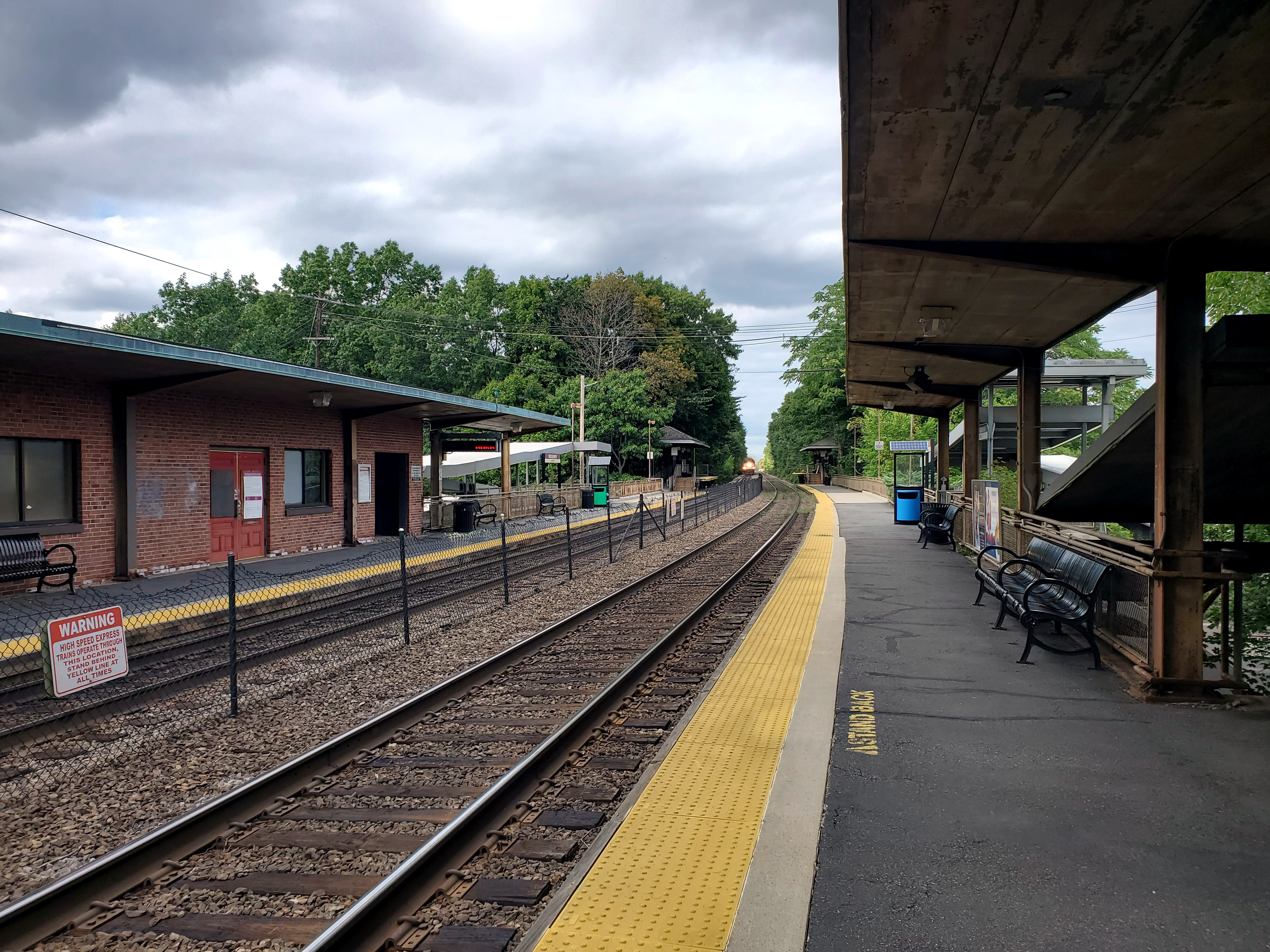
- Wedgemere station in September 2022

General information
- Location: 25 Mystic Valley Parkway; Winchester, Massachusetts
- Coordinates: 42.4445°N 71.1405°W
- Line: New Hampshire Main Line
- Platforms: 2 side platforms
- Tracks: 2

Construction
- Parking: 103 spaces (town permit required)
- Accessible: Yes

Other information
- Fare zone: 1

History
- Opened: 1840s
- Rebuilt: 1955–1957; 2011–February 1, 2013

Passengers
- 2024: 346 daily boardings

Services
Preceding station	MBTA	Following station
Winchester Center toward Lowell	Lowell Line	West Medford toward North Station
Former services
Preceding station	MBTA	Following station
Winchester Center toward Haverhill	Haverhill Line limited service	West Medford toward North Station
Preceding station	Boston and Maine Railroad	Following station
Winchester toward Concord, NH	Boston – Concord, NH	West Medford toward Boston
Location

Wedgemere station is an MBTA Commuter Rail station in the southeast portion of Winchester, Massachusetts, served by the Lowell Line. The station has two side platforms serving the line's two elevated tracks. The 1957-built station building, largely unused, is adjacent to the inbound platform. After several years of work, the station was made fully accessible in February 2013.

== History ==
=== Boston and Lowell Railroad ===
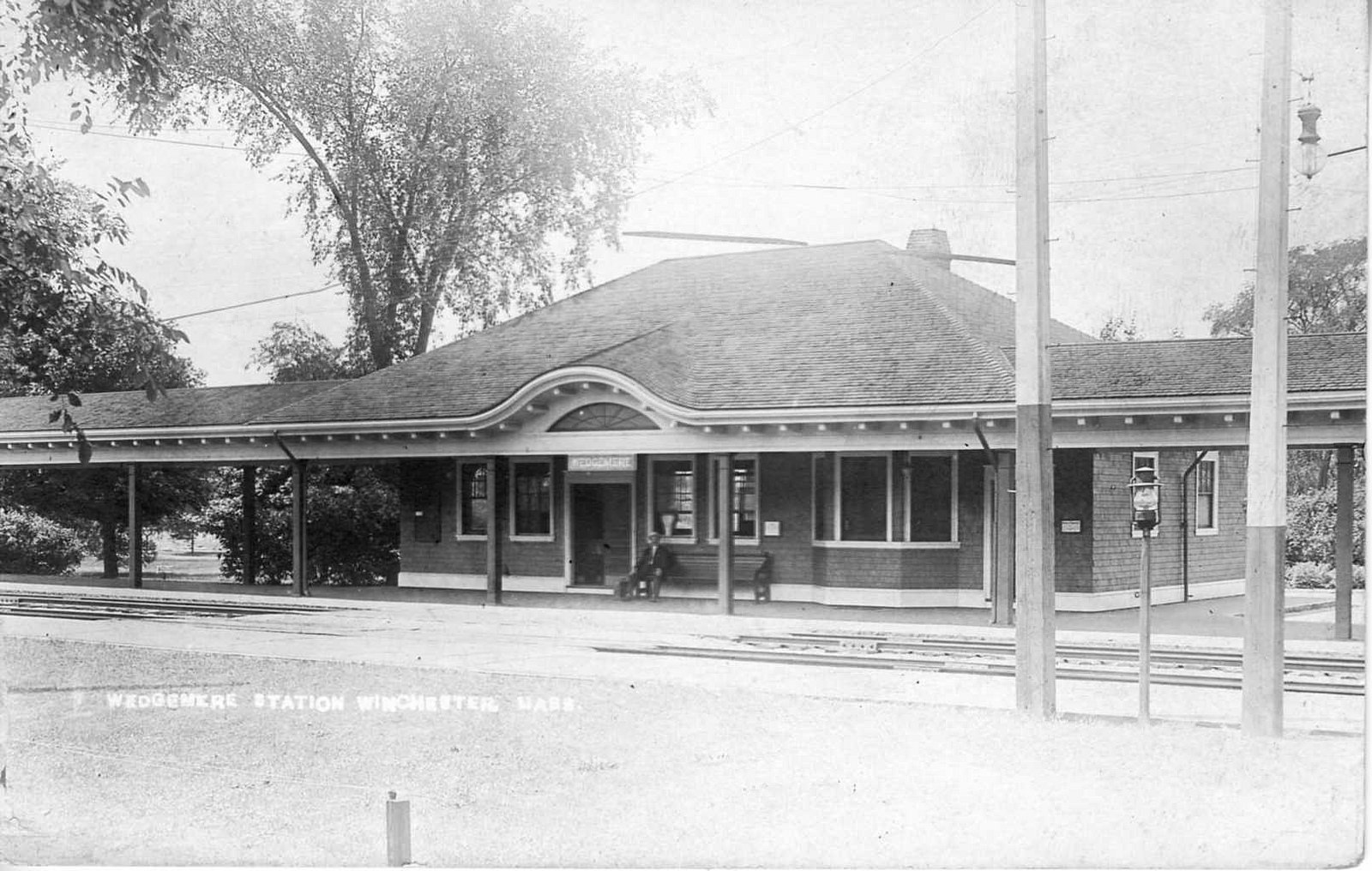
Wedgemere station around 1910

The Boston and Lowell Railroad (B&L) opened to Lowell on June 24, 1835. Many of the present stations on the line opened soon after; the B&L opened Bacon's Factory station (soon renamed Bacon's Bridge) at Bacon Street in northwestern Medford by 1846. (That section of Medford became part of Winchester in 1851.) The nearby stone arch bridge over the Aberjona River was destroyed by an ice jam during spring runoff in 1852. The station was soon renamed Symmes Bridge, then renamed Mystic in 1858. After 1887, the B&L was leased to its former rival, the Boston and Maine Railroad, as its New Hampshire Main Line.

=== Boston & Maine ===
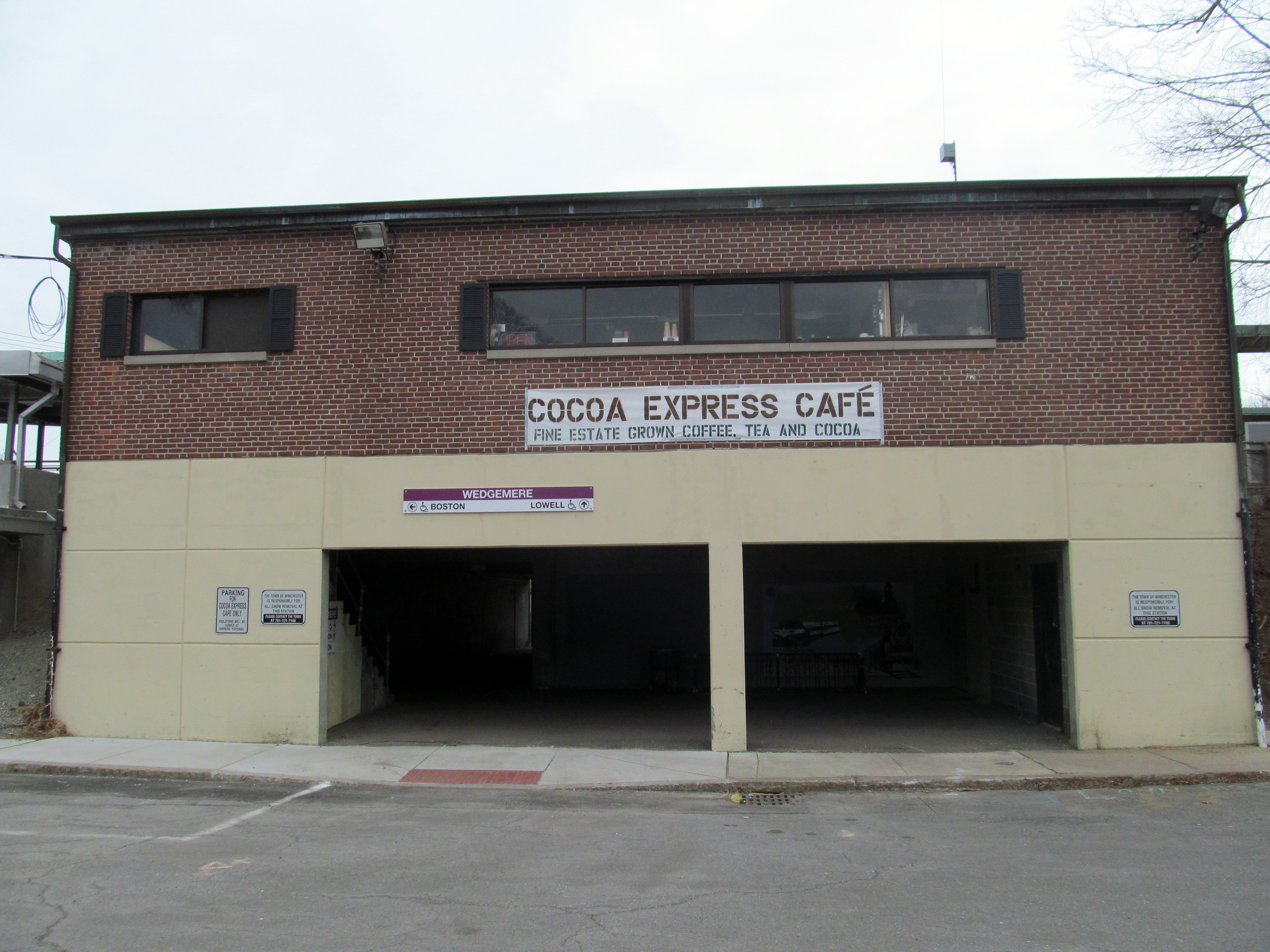
The 1957-built station hosted a coffee shop for 6 years

By the end of the 19th century, the station was known by its modern name, Wedgemere, after the surrounding neighborhood, and had a small station building on the east (outbound) side of the tracks. In the early 1900s, the B&M built a larger station building with an extended canopy on the west side of the tracks, which served for the next half-century.

In the early 1950s, the B&M began planning a project to raise the tracks of the New Hampshire Main and the southern end of the Woburn Branch for a mile through Winchester, eliminating troublesome grade crossings downtown. Construction began in 1955; boxy two-story brick stations opened at Wedgemere and Winchester Center in 1957. The ticket office in the new station was closed in 1960 after just three years in service; thereafter, passengers bought tickets on the train. The station building hosted a coffee shop from 2008 to 2014.

=== MBTA era and accessibility ===
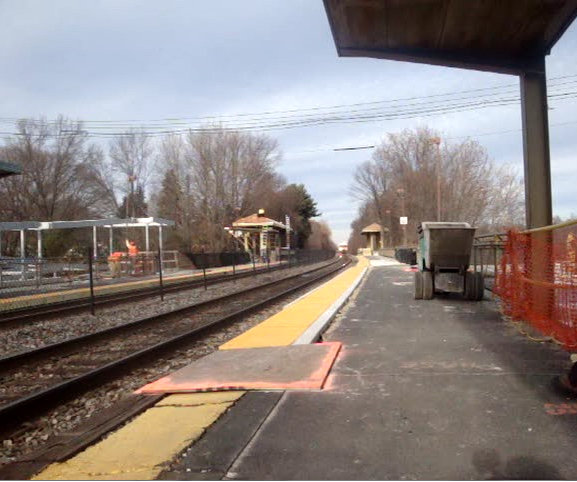
Construction work in February 2012

From the introduction of Massachusetts Bay Transportation Authority (MBTA) funding in 1965 until the mid-2000s, Wedgemere station remained essentially static. The Americans with Disabilities Act of 1990 required transit agencies to make certain stations handicapped accessible. A number of high-ridership stations on the MBTA Commuter Rail system were upgraded, but due to its relatively low ridership, Wedgemere was not chosen as a key station for upgrades. Wedgemere had older low-level platforms, and access from the street was via stairs only. Beginning in 2008, a local family lobbied the MBTA to make the station accessible; in July 2009, the Federal Transit Administration granted the MBTA permission to build mini-high platforms. (Full-length high level platforms would not have been possible because the Lowell Line is a designated freight corridor; full-length platforms cause operational difficulties with freight trains. Wedgemere does not have room for a dedicated freight passing track like Anderson RTC.) In February 2010, the MBTA announced that $2 million in federal stimulus funds had been allotted to the project, part of a grant that also funded construction of the John W. Olver Transit Center and repairs to the Red Line tunnels between Harvard and Alewife. The work was then intended to be finished by the end of 2010.

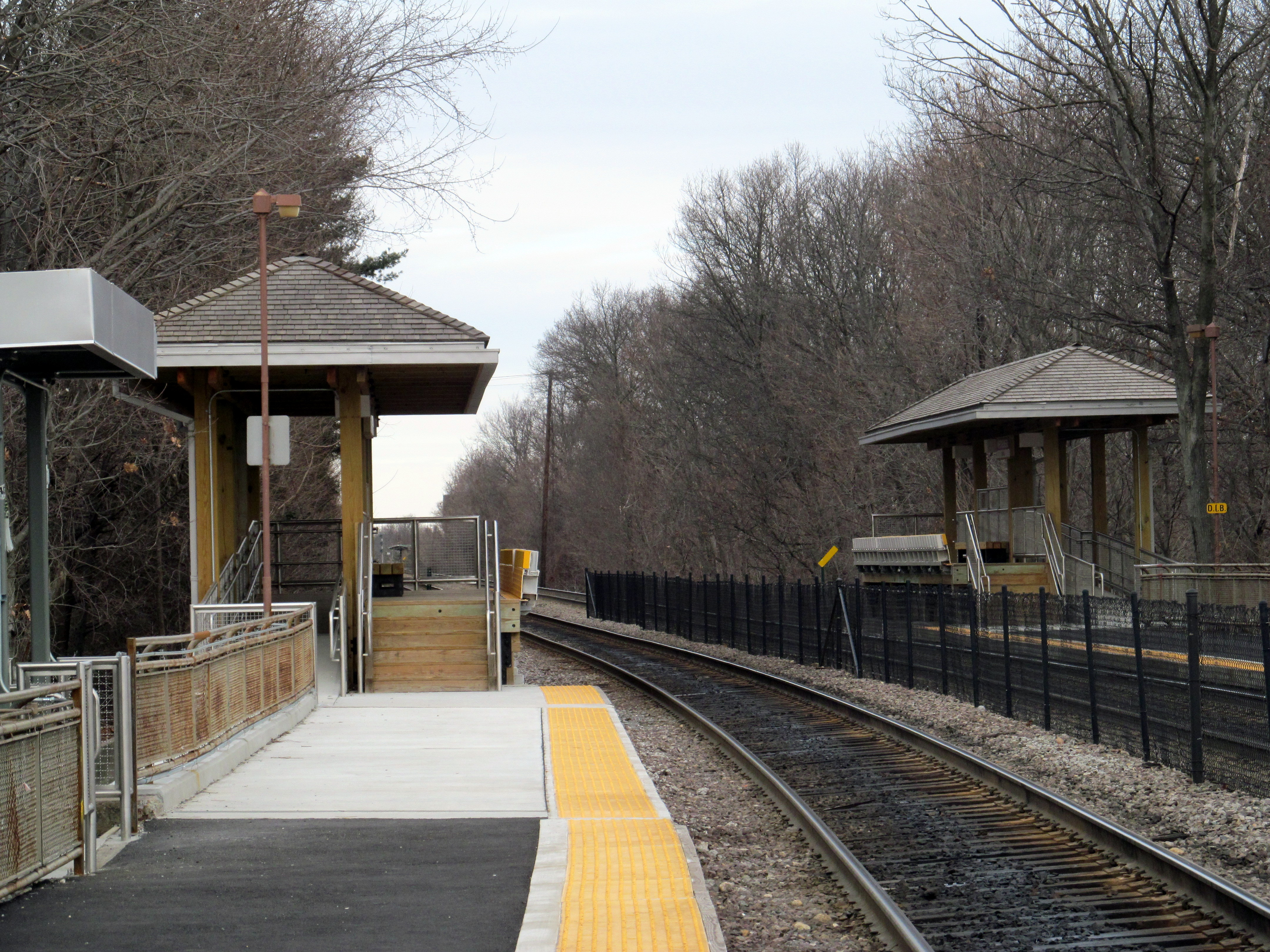
Completed mini-high platforms in January 2013

After delays due to concerns over nearby wetlands and the appearance of the ramps from street level, the Town of Winchester granted approval in March 2011. In April 2011, the MBTA began soliciting bids for the primary construction work on the station, worth $1.525 million. The scope of work included construction of the mini-high platforms and ramps from street level, as well as adding lighting, rehabilitating the low level platforms, and creating accessible parking spaces. After bids came in higher than expected, a $2.503 million contract was awarded in July 2011 with notice to proceed in August.

Construction was to be completed in mid-September 2011 ahead of the October deadline for stimulus funds, but a problem with town permitting in early September delayed the completion of the project. Construction resumed in November. The mini-high platforms, ramps, and new parking spaces opened on February 1, 2013, making the station fully accessible. Finishing work on platform reconstruction, lighting, and landscaping lasted the spring of 2013, culminating in a reopening ceremony in June.

Until December 2020, a small number of Haverhill Line trains ran via the Wildcat Branch and the inner Lowell Line, making stops including Wedgemere. This routing was resumed in April 2021, with the trains no longer making the intermediate stops. Until May 2023, West Medford and Wedgemere were flag stops outside of weekday peak hours. Effective May 22, 2023, they were made regular scheduled stops at all times.
