= Lowell Line =

MBTA Commuter Rail line

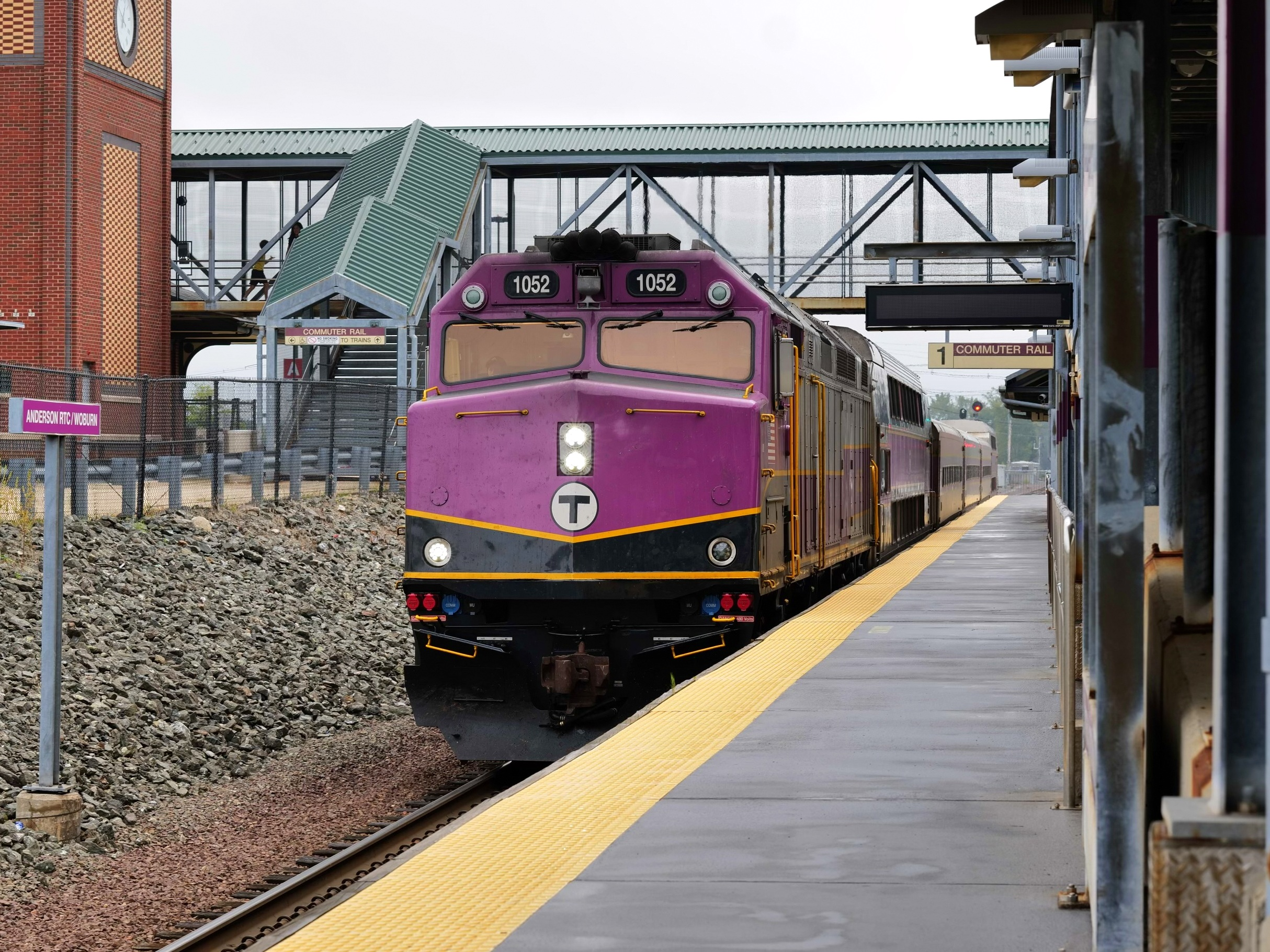
- An outbound train arriving at Anderson RTC in 2023

Overview
- Status: Operational
- Owner: Massachusetts Bay Transportation Authority
- Locale: Northeastern Massachusetts
- Termini: Lowell; North Station
- Stations: 9

Service
- Type: Commuter rail
- System: MBTA Commuter Rail
- Train number(s): 3001-3046 (weekdays); 3501-3518 (weekends)
- Operator: Keolis North America
- Daily ridership: 6,297 (2024) (October 2022)

History
- Opened: 1835 (Boston and Lowell Railroad)

Technical
- Line length: 25.4 miles (40.9 km)
- Num of tracks: 2
- Track gauge: 4 ft 8 1/2 in (1,435 mm)

The Lowell Line is a commuter rail service of the MBTA Commuter Rail system, running north–south between Boston and Lowell, Massachusetts. It is 25.4 miles (40.9 km) long, with nine stations including the terminals at North Station and Lowell station. All stations are accessible except for Mishawum, which has been indefinitely closed since 2020.

Lowell Line service runs on the New Hampshire Main Line, originally built as the Boston and Lowell Railroad in 1835. It was leased by the Boston and Maine Railroad in 1887. Local service operated between Boston and Concord, New Hampshire, with most trains using the Woburn Loop until 1959. The final Concord service ended in 1967 during the transition to Massachusetts Bay Transportation Authority subsidization, leaving Lowell–Boston and Woburn–Boston service. Concord service briefly resumed in 1980–81; Woburn service ended in 1981.

== History ==
=== Boston and Lowell Railroad ===
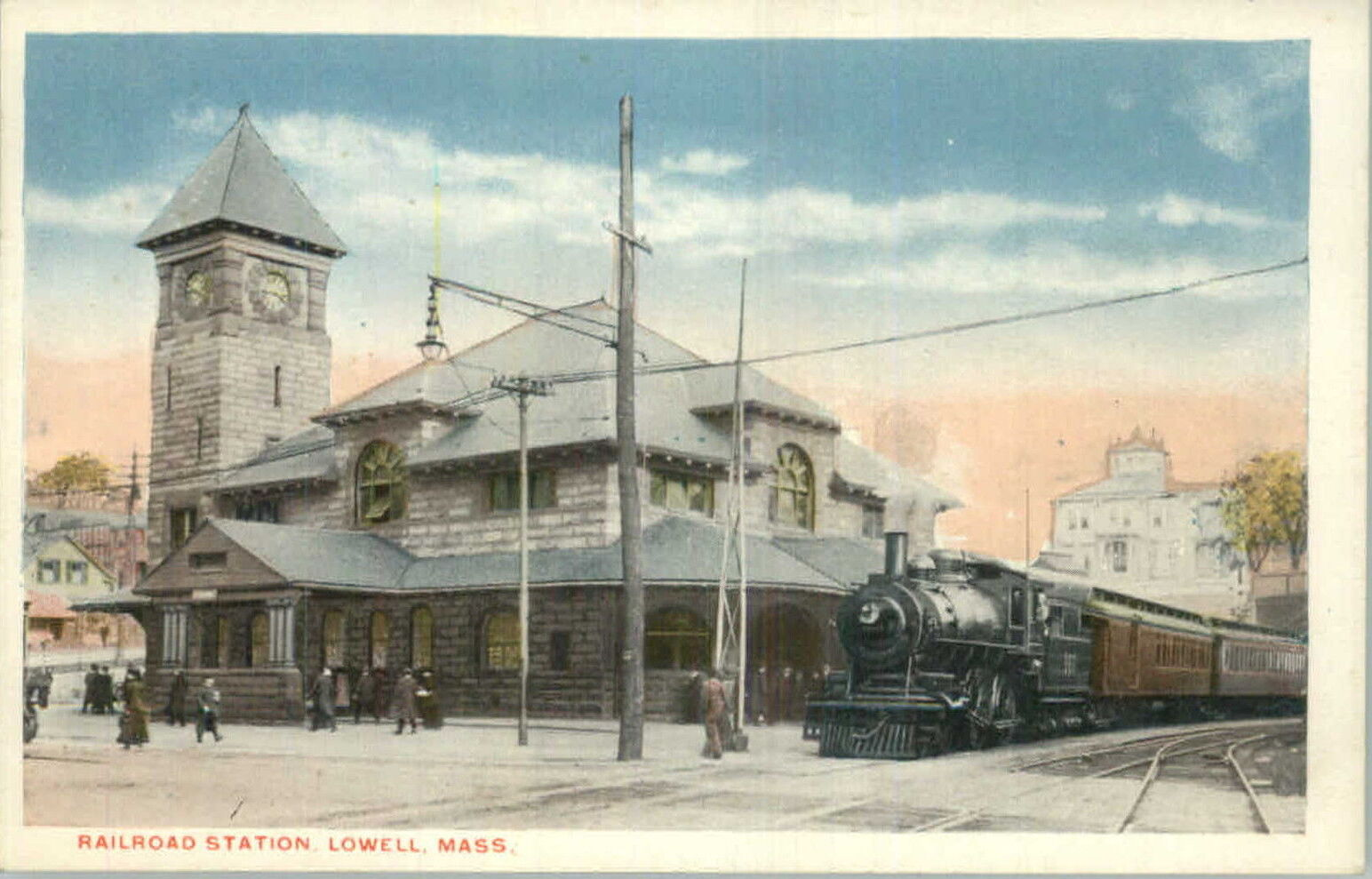
Early-20th-century postcard of a train at Lowell Union Station

The Boston and Lowell Railroad started freight operations in 1835, with traffic from the Lowell mills to the Boston port. Demand for the express passenger service exceeded expectations, and in 1842 local service was added as well. The line north of Lowell was first owned by the Boston, Concord & Montreal Railroad, which was chartered in 1844. Trackage was completed as far as Wells River, Vermont, in 1853. The Boston & Maine Railroad (B&M) acquired the railroad in 1895. The line served as the route for Boston to Montreal service during the Golden Age of Rail (roughly 1880 to 1940). The Ambassador, the train from Boston's North Station to Montreal, ran through Concord, New Hampshire, along this line until 1966. This line, along with the New Englander, via Concord, White River Junction, Montpelier, ran through the northwestern section of Vermont prior to entering Quebec, Canada. The Alouette and Red Wing trains travelled to Montreal via Concord, Plymouth, Wells River and Newport in northeastern Vermont prior to entering Quebec. (The route via Wells River, St. Johnsbury and Newport was the more direct route of the two itineraries.) For this itinerary the Montreal route was marketed as an Air-line railroad.

Service cuts effective May 18, 1958, included the end of Stoneham Branch service and the closure of Medford Hillside, Tufts College, and North Somerville stations. Further cuts on June 14, 1959, ended service north of Woburn on the Woburn Loop; trains for points north were rerouted via the mainline to the east. Boston–Lowell local service was halved to seven daily round trips; Tyngsboro, Bleachery, and South Wilmington stations were closed. B&M passenger service to Boston on the line was shortened from Concord, New Hampshire, to Lowell in 1967.

=== MBTA era ===
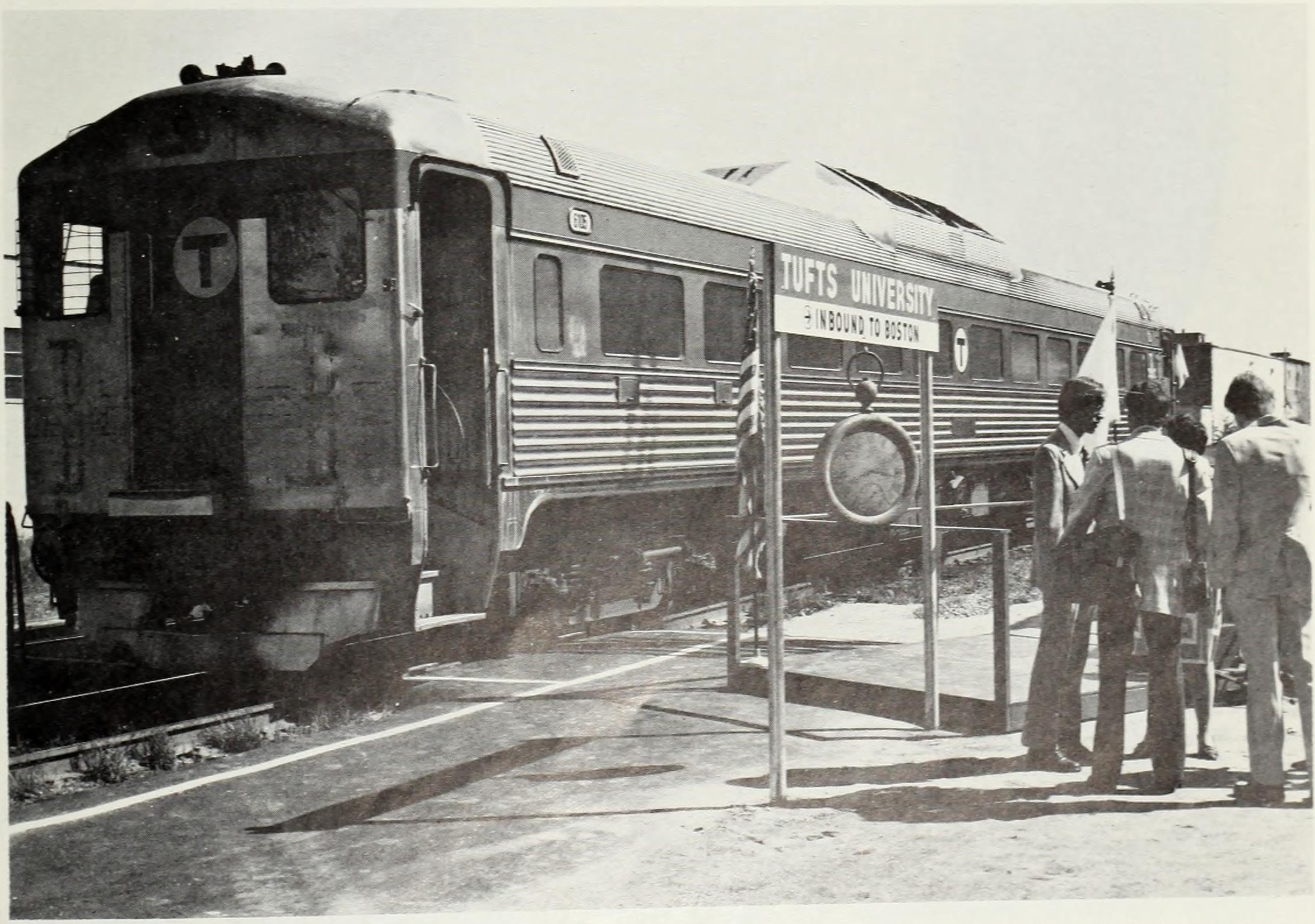
A train at Tufts University station in 1977

In 1973, the MBTA bought the Lowell line, along with the Haverhill and all other local Greater Boston passenger lines. Along with the sale, the B&M contracted to run the passenger service on the Lowell line for the MBTA. After bankruptcy, the B&M continued to run and fulfill its commuter rail contract under the protection of the United States Bankruptcy Court, in the hopes that a reorganization could make it profitable again. It emerged from the court's protection when newly formed Guilford Transportation Industries (GTI) purchased it in 1983.

For approximately thirteen months in 1980–81, daily passenger service was provided to Concord. Two round-trips were operated on each weekday and one on weekend days. Originally, there were intermediate stops in Manchester and Nashua. A stop in Merrimack was added later. Service was discontinued when federal funding was withdrawn.

Anderson Regional Transportation Center opened on April 28, 2001, replacing Mishawum as the Lowell Line's primary park-and-ride station for Route 128. Mishawum was reduced to limited reverse-peak service. On December 15, 2001, the Amtrak Downeaster began operating over the line south of Wilmington. In October 2006, the MBTA added four short turn round trips that terminated at Anderson RTC. The line was shut down on weekends in July through September 2017 for the installation of Positive Train Control equipment in order to meet a 2020 federal deadline.

=== 2020s ===
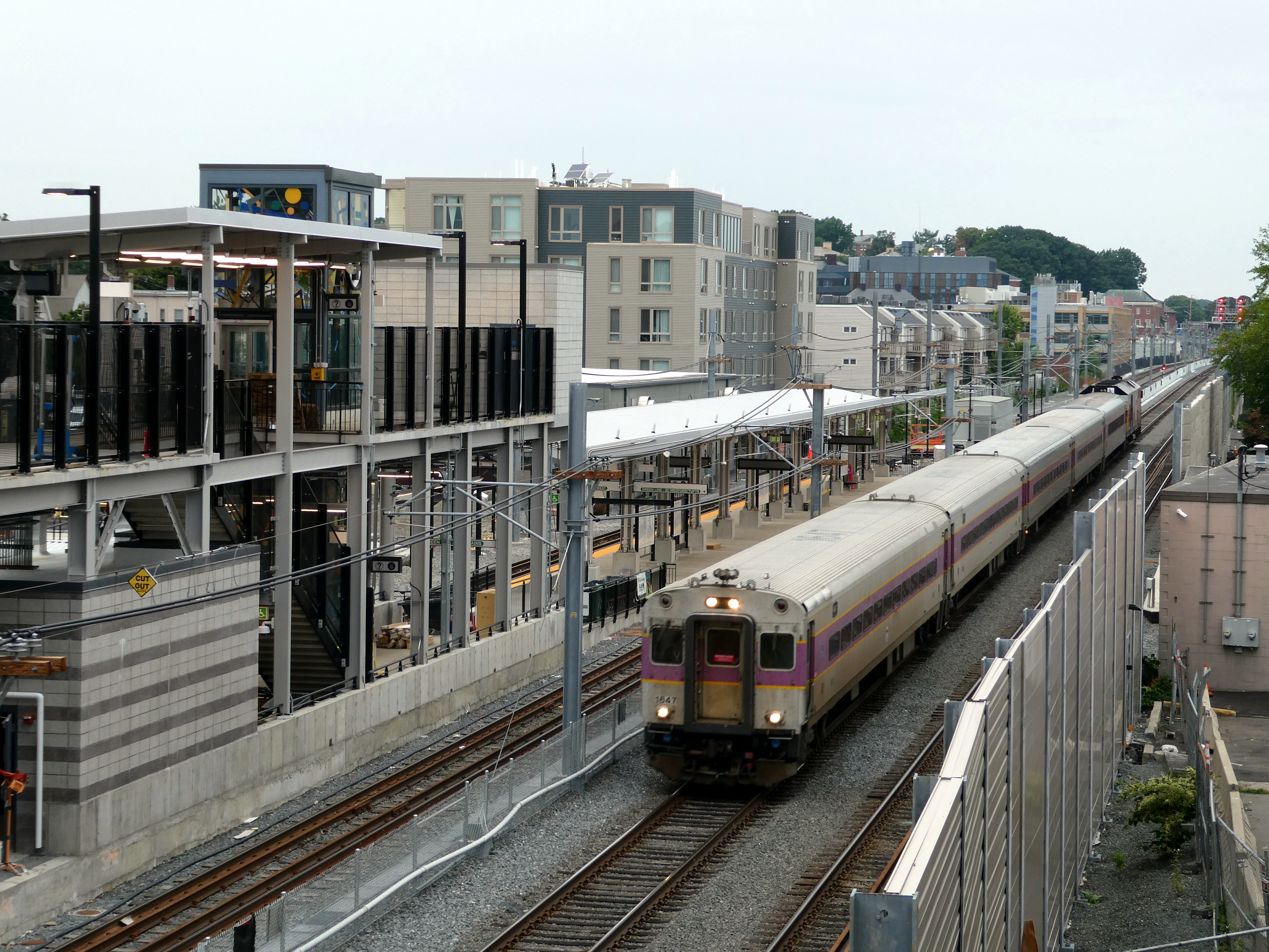
Lowell Line train passing the nearly-complete Ball Square station in September 2022

Substantially reduced schedules due to the COVID-19 pandemic were in effect from March 16 to June 23, 2020, and from December 14, 2020, to April 5, 2021. On January 23, 2021, reduced schedules went into place with no weekend service on seven lines, including the Lowell Line. Weekend service on the seven lines resumed on July 3, 2021. Until December 2020, a small number of Haverhill Line trains ran via the Wildcat Branch and the inner Lowell Line, making stops between Anderson/Woburn and West Medford. Some Haverhill Line trains resumed using this routing on April 5, 2021, but no longer make stops on the Lowell Line.

By February 2022, the line had 21 1/2 round trips on weekdays and nine on weekends. By October 2022, the line had 6,485 daily riders – 59% of pre-COVID ridership. In June 2022, the MBTA indicated it was considering improvements to a siding in Woburn, which would have allowed 30-minute headways between Boston and Anderson/Woburn by 2024. The Medford Branch of the Green Line Extension, which opened on December 12, 2022, runs along the Lowell Line through Somerville and part of Medford. There are five Green Line stations on the branch, but no additional commuter rail stops were added.

From September 9 to November 5, 2023, all outer Haverhill Line service was routed over the Wildcat Branch during signal work on the inner part of the Haverhill Line. The diverted trains stopped only at Anderson/Woburn. On March 25, 2024, weekday midday service was reduced to two-hour headways to accommodate construction including reconstruction of Winchester Center station, fiber optic cable work, and replacement of a bridge on the High Line in the Inner Belt District. From May 20 to September 29, 2024, weekday midday inbound Haverhill Line trains were temporarily routed over the Wildcat Branch during construction work on the inner Haverhill Line, again stopping only at Anderson/Woburn. Regular midday service on the Lowell Line resumed on June 2, 2025.

=== Proposed expansion to New Hampshire ===
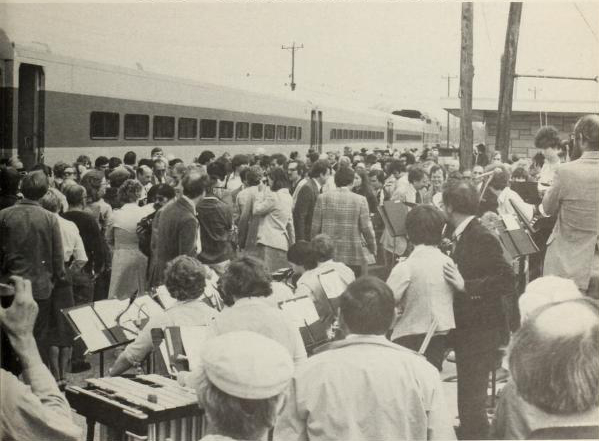
An MBTA demonstration train at Concord, New Hampshire, in 1979

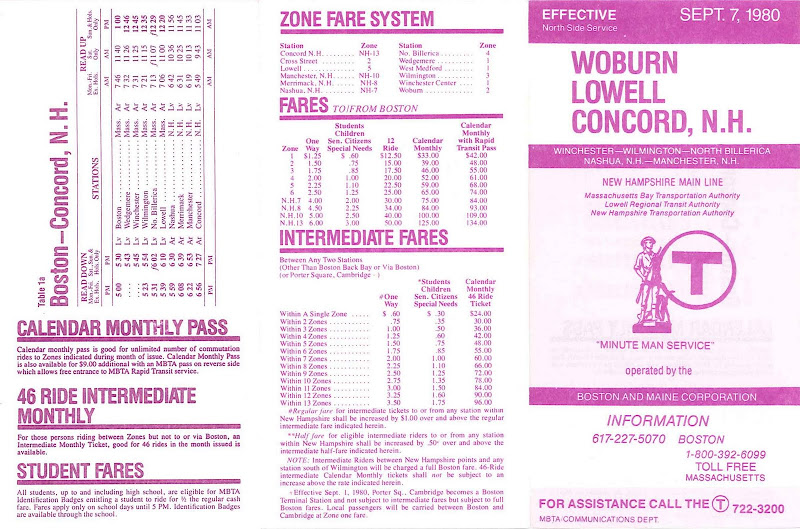
For a time in 1980-81, some MBTA Commuter Rail trains routed on the New Hampshire Main ran as far up as Concord.

MBTA Commuter Rail service connecting Concord, Manchester and Nashua from the Lowell Line used to exist in New Hampshire until subsidies were ceased in 1967. The service came back in 1980 for a quick 13 month return, but the program grant was cut by the Reagan administration in 1981, and commuter rail service has remained not available. In October 2010, the New Hampshire Department of Transportation (NHDOT) received a $2.24 million federal grant to study an extension of the Lowell Line to Concord. In January 2011, a bill was introduced into the New Hampshire legislature to end the proposed extension and give up a potential $4.1 million grant into its planning. The MBTA acquired trackage rights from Pan Am in May 2011 as part of a larger transaction.

The project was estimated to cost $246 million in a 2014 NHDOT report. Extending service to NH was projected to provide an expected 34 trains a day to Nashua and 16 a day to Manchester, connecting commuters from Nashua to Boston as low as 54 minutes and commuters from Manchester to Boston in as low as 1 hour and 25 minutes with 3,120 passengers a day. Proponents of the extension see expanded rail services as a link to Boston’s growing economy while opponents consider the project to be extraneous and expensive.

In December 2020, a $5.5 million contract was awarded to AECOM for preliminary engineering and design work, environmental and public engagement services, and final design, for the project to extend MBTA commuter rail service to southern New Hampshire. The project called for the extension of the Lowell Line up through Nashua and Manchester along an existing rail alignment. The proposed expansion would include four new stops: South Nashua, Crown Street in Nashua, Bedford, and Manchester. In January 2022, the Manchester Board of Mayor and Aldermen approved the location for new facilities to house layover trains adjacent to the Manchester Transit Authority facilities.

By autumn 2022, the study was being carried out by AECOM and the State of New Hampshire to design and make a financial plan for the project by 2023. In December 2022, the New Hampshire Executive Council voted to cease state funding for an extension of the AECOM study; the study reported an updated project cost of $782 million. As of 2026, corridor planning for the extension has been indefinitely postponed.

== Operations ==
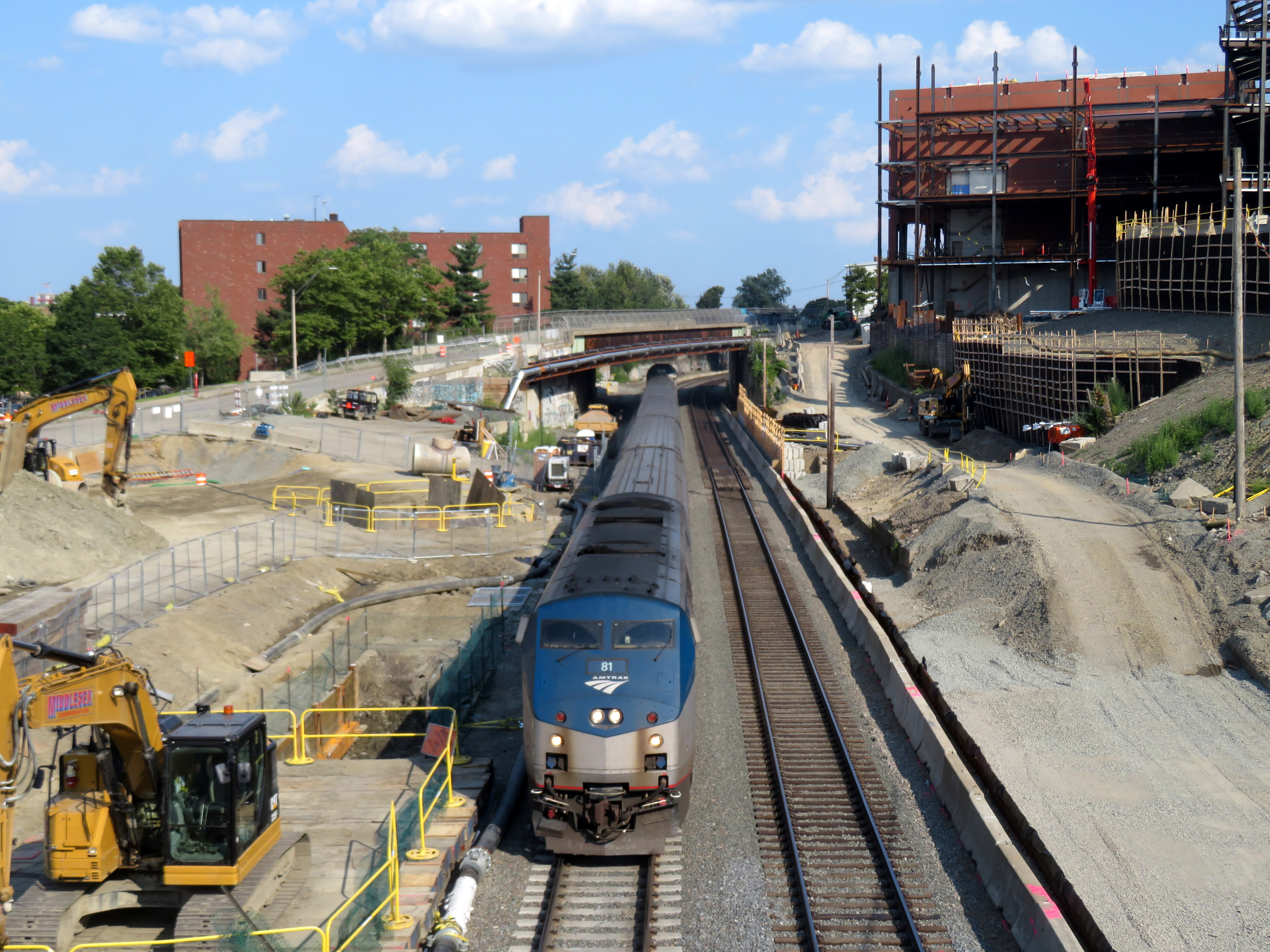
A Downeaster train in Somerville

=== Track speeds ===
North of Wilmington, the line is authorized for a maximum of 60 miles per hour (97 km/h). South of Wilmington, the line has an unusual asymmetrical speed limit. The northbound track supports up to 70 miles per hour (110 km/h) where curvature allows, while the southbound track has a maximum of 60 miles per hour (97 km/h). Additional speed restrictions are in place at Wilmington, through the grade crossings in West Medford, and in the North Station terminal area.

=== Other services ===
Amtrak's Downeaster service to Maine, along with some Haverhill Line express trains, run on the Lowell Line from North Station to Wilmington, then follow the Wildcat Branch to the Haverhill Line. This routing is used to avoid the inner Haverhill Line, which has a number of single-track sections.

The line is the designated freight clearance route into Boston from the north; all stations with high-level platforms must either have mini-high platforms or a freight passing track. Pan Am Railways runs freight on the line, including local freights based out of Lawrence Yard and DOBO (a Dover to Boston through freight).

== Station listing ==
State	Fare zone	Location	Miles (km)	Station	Connections and notes
MA	1A	Boston	0.0 (0.0)	North Station	Amtrak: Downeaster; MBTA Commuter Rail: Fitchburg Line, Haverhill Line, Newburyport/Rockport Line; MBTA subway: Orange Line, Green Line (D and E branches); MBTA bus: 4 EZRide; MBTA ferry: F10; Seaport Ferry
MA	1A	Somerville	0.8 (1.3)	Boston Engine Terminal	Flag stop for MBTA employees only
MA	1A	Medford	4.0 (6.4)	Tufts University	Open September 1977 to October 1979
MA	1A	Medford	5.5 (8.9)	West Medford	MBTA bus: 94, 95
MA	1	Winchester	7.3 (11.7)	Wedgemere	
MA	1	Winchester	7.8 (12.6)	Winchester Center	MBTA bus: 134; Former junction with Woburn Branch (closed 1981)
MA		Winchester	9.0 (14.5)	Winchester Highlands	Closed June 1978
MA		Woburn	10.5 (16.9)	Walnut Hill	Closed January 18, 1965
MA		Woburn	10.9 (17.5)	Lechmere Warehouse	Open 1979 to 1996
MA	2	Woburn	11.6 (18.7)	Mishawum	Flag stop with limited reverse commute service. Indefinitely closed on December 14, 2020.
MA	2	Woburn	12.7 (20.4)	Anderson/Woburn	Amtrak: Downeaster; Logan Express
MA	3	Wilmington	15.2 (24.5)	Wilmington	LRTA: 12, 21; Junction with the Wildcat Branch
MA		Wilmington	17.0 (27.4)	Silver Lake	Closed January 18, 1965
MA		Billerica	19.2 (30.9)	East Billerica	Closed January 18, 1965
MA	5	Billerica	21.8 (35.1)	North Billerica	LRTA: 3, 13
MA	6	Lowell	25.5 (41.0)	Lowell	LRTA: 1, 2, 3, 4, 5, 6, 7, 8, 9, 10, 11, 12, 13, 14, 15, 16, 17, 18, 19, 20; MVRTA: 24
MA		Chelmsford	28.7 (46.2)	North Chelmsford	Closed June 30, 1967
NH		Nashua	39.0 (62.8)	Nashua	Closed June 30, 1967; open from January 28, 1980 to March 1, 1981
NH		Merrimack	46.1 (74.2)	Merrimack	Open from April 1980 to March 1, 1981
NH		Manchester	55.5 (89.3)	Manchester	Closed June 30, 1967; open from January 28, 1980 to March 1, 1981
NH		Concord	73.3 (118.0)	Concord	Closed June 30, 1967; open from January 28, 1980 to March 1, 1981
Closed station

=== Woburn Branch ===
Location	Miles (km)	Station	Connections and notes
Winchester	7.8 (12.6)	Winchester Center	Junction with mainline
Woburn	9.0 (14.5)	Cross Street	Closed February 1, 1981
Woburn	9.8 (15.8)	Woburn	Closed February 1, 1981
Closed station
