= Winchester, Massachusetts =

- Town
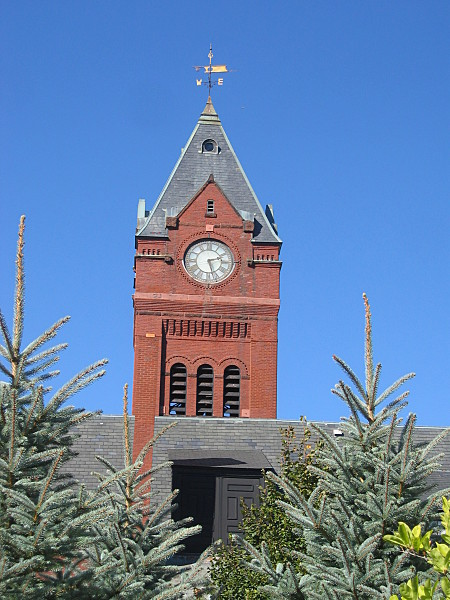
- Winchester Town Hall

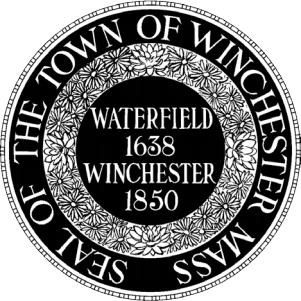
- Seal

- Location in Middlesex County in Massachusetts
- Coordinates: 42°27′08″N 71°08′15″W
- Country: United States
- State: Massachusetts
- County: Middlesex
- Region: New England
- Settled: 1640
- Incorporated: 1850
- Named for: William P. Winchester

Government
  - Type: Representative town meeting
  - Town Manager: Christopher Senior

Area
  - Total: 6.3 sq mi (16.3 km^{2})
  - Land: 6.0 sq mi (15.6 km^{2})
  - Water: 0.23 sq mi (0.6 km^{2})
- Elevation: 62 ft (19 m)

Population (2020)
  - Total: 22,970
  - Density: 3,813/sq mi (1,472.4/km^{2})
- Time zone: UTC−5 (Eastern)
  - Summer (DST): UTC−4 (Eastern)
- ZIP Code: 01890
- Area code: 339 / 781
- FIPS code: 25-80510
- GNIS feature ID: 0618247
- Website: winchester.us

Winchester is a town in Middlesex County, Massachusetts, United States, located 8.2 miles (13.2 km) north of downtown Boston as part of the Greater Boston metropolitan area. It is also one of the wealthiest municipalities in Massachusetts. The population was 22,970 at the 2020 United States Census.

== History ==
Native Americans inhabited the area that would become Winchester for thousands of years prior to European colonization of the Americas. At the time of contact, the area was inhabited by the Naumkeag people, from whom the land that would become Winchester was purchased for the settlement of Charlestown in 1639.

From the 17th century until the middle of the 19th century, parts of Arlington, Medford, Cambridge, and Woburn comprised what is now Winchester. In the early years of the settlement, the area was informally known as Waterfield, a reference to its many ponds and to the river, which divided the central village. In its second century, the area was referred to as Black Horse Village, after the busy tavern and inn at its center. The movement toward incorporation of what, by this time, was called South Woburn may have been caused by the rise of the Whig Party in Massachusetts.^{[Elaboration needed]}

=== 19th and 20th centuries ===
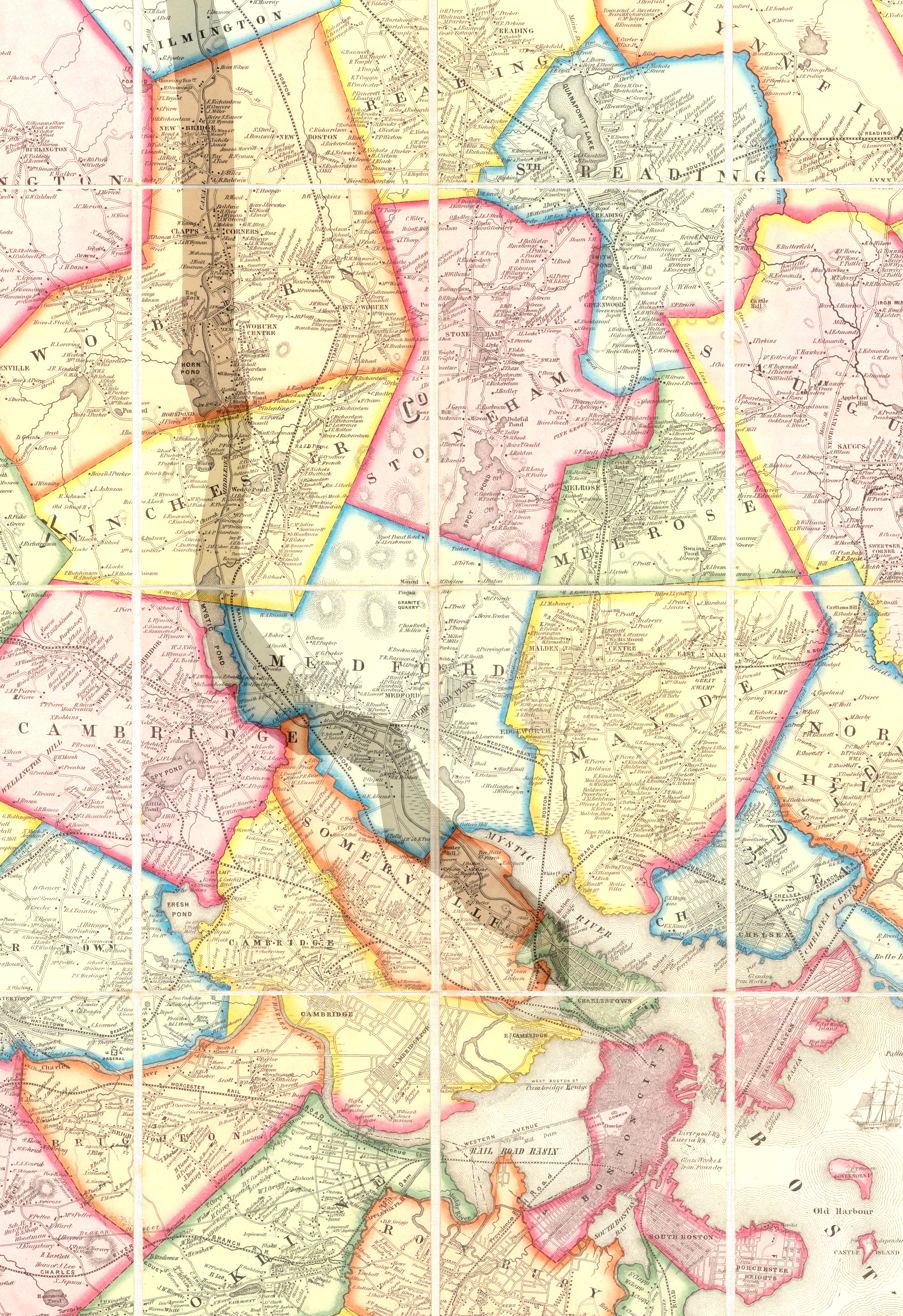
1852 map of Boston area showing Winchester and the Middlesex Canal

The town's early growth paralleled improvements in transportation. Prior to incorporation, the Middlesex Canal, linking the Merrimack River to Boston, was completed through what was then Waterfield. It flourished from 1803 to 1836, until the Boston and Lowell Railroad completed a line that neatly split the town and provided it with two stations. Able to deliver passengers as well as goods, the railroad soon superseded the canal and spurred more people to move to the area. The first church was built in 1840, the Post Office followed in 1841, and soon after incorporation town schools were started. Industries small and large followed, including the Beggs and Cobb tannery and the Winn Watch Hand factory, which would operate well into the 20th century.

By the time of the Civil War, to which Winchester lent many citizens, the need for a town water supply became apparent. Engineers convinced a skeptical public to fund a dam in the highlands to the east of town. The structure blocked the creek that flowed from the Middlesex Fells and produced the first of three reservoirs that continue to provide water today.

In the early 20th century, growth continued swiftly as Winchester evolved from its agrarian and industrial roots into the bedroom community it is today. A rich mix of immigrants—the Irish in the northern and eastern neighborhoods, small numbers of African-Americans who flocked to the New Hope Baptist Church in the highlands, and later Italians who came to work in the westside farms while living in the "Plains" to the east—complemented Winchester's Yankee forebears.

== Geography ==
According to the United States Census Bureau, the town has a total area of 6.3 square miles (16.3 km^{2}), of which 6.0 square miles (15.6 km^{2}) is land and 0.2 square miles (0.6 km^{2}) is water. The total area is 3.97% water.

The town is roughly bisected by a central valley, which is the remnant of the original course of the Merrimack River. After glacial debris effectively rerouted the Merrimack north to its current location, all that remained of its original course through present day Winchester is the Aberjona River and the several ponds it feeds en route to the Mystic Lakes on Winchester's southern border.

On its eastern third, the valley rises steeply into the wooded hills of the Middlesex Fells Reservation, in which lie the North, Middle, and South Reservoirs. The western edge of the valley yields to Arlington and Lexington heights, and the boundaries with those two towns. To the north, the town's longest border is shared with Woburn.

Winchester has several major bodies of water, including the Mystic Lakes, Wedge Pond, Winter Pond, and the Aberjona River, as well as several minor bodies of water such as Sucker Brook and Sachem Swamp.

Winchester borders the towns of Woburn, Stoneham, Medford, Arlington, and Lexington.

== Demographics ==
Historical population
| Year | Pop. | ±% |
|---|---|---|
| 1850 | 1,353 | — |
| 1860 | 1,937 | +43.2% |
| 1870 | 2,645 | +36.6% |
| 1880 | 3,802 | +43.7% |
| 1890 | 4,861 | +27.9% |
| 1900 | 7,248 | +49.1% |
| 1910 | 9,309 | +28.4% |
| 1920 | 10,485 | +12.6% |
| 1930 | 12,719 | +21.3% |
| 1940 | 15,081 | +18.6% |
| 1950 | 15,509 | +2.8% |
| 1960 | 19,376 | +24.9% |
| 1970 | 22,269 | +14.9% |
| 1980 | 20,701 | −7.0% |
| 1990 | 20,267 | −2.1% |
| 2000 | 20,810 | +2.7% |
| 2010 | 21,374 | +2.7% |
| 2020 | 22,970 | +7.5% |
| 2024* | 23,953 | +4.3% |
* = population estimate. Source: United States census records and Population Estimates Program data.

As of the census of 2010, there were 21,382 people, 7,647 households, and 5,785 families residing in the town. The population density was 3,394.6 inhabitants per square mile (1,310.7/km^{2}). There were 7,988 housing units at an average density of 1,267.9 per square mile (489.5/km^{2}). The racial makeup of the town was 87.1% White, 9.3% Asian, 1.0% African American, 0.1% Native American, 0.04% Pacific Islander, 0.4% from other races, and 2.0% from two or more races. Hispanic or Latino people of any race were 1.9% of the population.

There were 7,647 households, of which 40.5% had children under the age of 18 living with them, 65.7% were married couples living together, 7.6% had a female householder with no husband present, and 24.3% were non-families. 21.8% of all households were made up of individuals, and 11.1% had someone living alone who was 65 years of age or older. The average household size was 2.75 and the average family size was 3.26.

In the town, the population was spread out, with 28.7% under the age of 18 and 16.2% over the age of 65. The median age was 42.7 years. The population was 52.3% female and 47.7% male.

According to a 2008 estimate, the median income for a household in the town was $125,952, and the median income for a family was $200,000+. Males had a median income of $100,000+ versus $70,847 for females. The per capita income for the town was $68,479. The median home value was $838,420, compared to a U.S. average of $180,000. About 1.3% of families and 2.6% of the population were below the poverty line, including 3.0% of those under the age of 18 and 2.3% ages 65 or older.

The crime rate in Winchester is below the U.S. average. The most common crime is property crime, with 62 burglaries reported in 2010. Violent crimes are rare, with only five murders and five rapes reported in 10 years.

Winchester was ranked number 86 on the Bloomberg list of America's 100 Richest Places with an average household income of $204,878 in 2016.

== Education ==
=== Public schools ===
Winchester has five elementary schools (Ambrose, Lincoln, Lynch, Muraco, and Vinson-Owen) and one middle school, McCall Middle School.

Considered one of Boston's elite public high schools, Winchester High School was founded in 1850; at the time, it was part of present-day Lincoln Elementary. Winchester High was rebuilt in a different area in 1972, then renovated in 2017.

Winchester public schools have achieved superior performances on the MCAS exams since their inception, and the district is consistently ranked by editorial reviews such as Boston Magazine as one of the best in Massachusetts.

The Winchester High School sports teams were known as the "Sachems", a term that refers to people who have been appointed to represent a (native) nation in a meeting of a confederacy council. However, the mascot was removed in 2020 due to its offensive and stereotypical nature. Their sports teams are now known as the "Red and Black", referring to the school's colors.

For the 2018–2019 school year, Winchester public schools and Winchester Recreation developed the WRAP-AROUND program. This program was designed to provide supervision for students who are dropped at school early or who need to stay at school later, and to assist families with the school start time change for the next fall. Wrap-around care is offered at all five elementary schools for students in grades K–5, both before and after school.

The teams practice and host home games at Knowlton Field. The Winchester Sports Foundation raises money through donations to maintain sports programs in the town, give financial support, make sports programs accessible to all classes, meet costs of program expenses, and preserve and promote the level of WHS sports programs.

=== Private schools ===
Founded in the 1942, the Children's Own School is among the earlier surviving Montessori schools in the United States. The building it occupies, a former farmhouse, is considered locally historic. The school's founder, Dorothy Gove, was an acquaintance of Maria Montessori, giving her a firsthand opportunity to learn the Montessori concept of learning. Today the school operates as a private, non-religious, Montessori school for children of ages two to six, with classes of up to 20 children. Children's Own School is located at 86 Main Street in Winchester.

Winchester has two parent-led cooperative nursery schools: Neighborhood Cooperative Nursery School and Winchester Cooperative Nursery School. The Methodist church, Winchester Recreation Department, and Creative Corner also offer preschool classes.

St. Mary's School is a parochial school of St. Mary's Parish. The school opened in 1914 and has over 200 students in grades Pre-K through 5. The school building also serves as the Sunday school for the parish during Sunday services. The church is listed on the National Register of Historic Places.

Acera School is a small private school founded in 2010 in Melrose, which moved to Winchester in 2013. It offers K–8 education in small multi-age classrooms.

Established in 2004, the Winchester School of Chinese Culture is a non-profit organization whose mission is to teach the language and traditional culture of China through classroom instructions, the arts, and cultural events. The school offers a K–8 weekend program at now Vinson-Owen elementary school following the recent reconstruction of Lynch Elementary , after-school programs at Winchester Unitarian Church, Winchester First Congregational Church, and at Lotus Academy summer program, and a private K-6 elementary school called Lotus Academy at 162R Washington St.

== Transportation ==
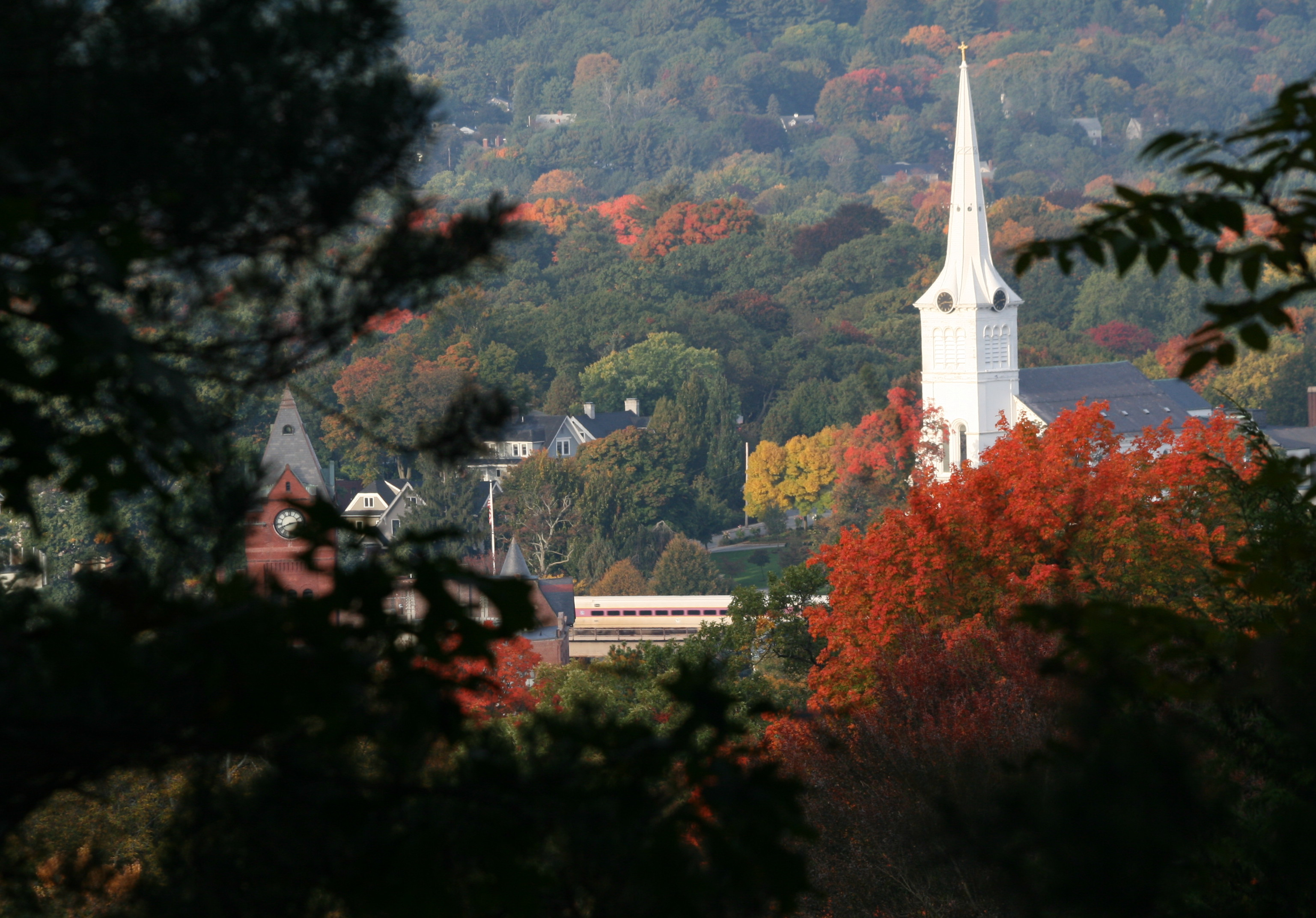
Train at the Winchester MBTA station in October 2008, between the Town Hall and the First Congregational Church.

Winchester has two "Zone 1" stops on the MBTA Commuter Rail Lowell Line: Wedgemere and Winchester Center. The stops are within easy walking distance of one another. The Lowell Line runs from Lowell to Boston's North Station, where one can connect with the "T", Boston's subway system. Nearby Anderson Regional Transportation Center off I-93 (Commerce Way exit) holds a stop for Amtrak's Downeaster train, going through New Hampshire, and terminating in Brunswick, Maine. While this train runs through Winchester, it does not stop at either of the town's two train stations.

There are bus lines going through Winchester to nearby communities such as Medford, Arlington, and Cambridge. Bus route No. 134 runs between North Woburn and Wellington Station on the Massachusetts Bay Transportation Authority's (MBTA) Orange Line in Medford. Bus route No. 350 runs from the Burlington Mall to Alewife station in Cambridge on the MBTA's Red Line. A commuter express bus runs from Cummings Park in Woburn to Boston during rush hours. Anderson Regional Transportation Center also has the Logan Express shuttle bus service to Boston's Logan Airport every 30 minutes, and a paid shuttle service to Manchester New Hampshire Airport (reservations required in advance)

== Winchester today ==
In December 2010 Winchester was among 18 Massachusetts communities to earn the "Green Community" designation by the Massachusetts Department of Energy Resources (bringing the total number of green communities in the state up to 53). In 2011 Winchester was selected as one of four communities to participate in the Massachusetts Clean Energy Center (MassCEC) Solarize MASS pilot program. The program provided incentives to home owners to install rooftop solar electric systems. During that year, 35 residents contracted to have solar systems installed, resulting in 165 kW of solar installations. Most recently, in July 2014, Winchester received a $250,000 Green Communities Grant, which helped to offset the cost of installing 1668 cobra-head LED street lights. It is estimated that the LED streetlight conversion may potentially reduce the town's electricity costs by $50,000 each year.

Across the Main Street bypass from the high school sits the Jenks Community Center, which offers programs for seniors and other age groups. Wedge Pond, home to Borggaard Beach and Splash Park, is a popular swimming spot, which is continually monitored to ensure safe water quality levels. And every year, as for over a century, thousands of fans attend the annual Thanksgiving Day football contest between Winchester High School and its long-time traditional rival, Woburn.

Several private entities provide recreational opportunities for local townsfolk. Founded in 1900 as a canoe club, the Winchester Boat Club serves locals wishing to sail casually or competitively on the Mystic Lakes. In the summer, it is a popular meeting place for local families and their children. The Winchester Country Club—located in the Myopia Hill neighborhood—offers an 18-hole course open to members and named after the Myopia Club based there in the late 19th century.

== Government and politics ==
In the 1840s, the Whigs sought to split a new jurisdiction away from heavily Democratic Woburn and found enough supporters in the burgeoning village to organize a movement toward incorporation. Representatives of the planned new town selected the name Winchester in recognition of Colonel William P. Winchester of nearby Watertown, who pledged $3,000 toward the construction of the first town hall. Upon the signature of then Governor Briggs, the town of Winchester was officially incorporated on April 30, 1850. Colonel Winchester did not live to visit the town that had honored his family name. He died of typhoid fever within months of its incorporation.

Winchester's town government of selectmen and town meeting members has remained essentially unchanged for most of its existence, until the renaming of the board of selectmen to the select board in 2018. A 1970s survey listed Winchester as "one of the top fifteen suburbs" in the nation.

The town is part of the Massachusetts Senate's 2nd Middlesex district.

In recent years, Winchester has become an increasing stronghold for the Democratic Party, especially in presidential elections.

- In 2008, Winchester voted 59% for Democrat Barack Obama and 39% for Republican John McCain.
- In 2012, Winchester voted 55% for Democrat Barack Obama and 44% for Republican former Massachusetts governor Mitt Romney.
- In 2016, Winchester voted 68% for Democrat Hillary Clinton and 32% for Republican Donald Trump.
- In 2020, Winchester voted 71% for Democrat Joe Biden and 27.5% for Republican Donald Trump.

Below the presidential level, some moderate Republicans have been able to carry Winchester:

- In the 2010 United States Senate special election in Massachusetts, Winchester voted 51% for Republican Scott Brown and 48% for Democrat Martha Coakley.
- In the 2012 United States Senate election, Winchester voted 52% for Republican Scott Brown and 48% for Democrat Elizabeth Warren.
- In the 2018 Massachusetts gubernatorial election, Winchester voted 71% for incumbent Republican Charlie Baker and 29% for Democrat Jay Gonzalez.

=== Town services ===
Town services include full-time police and fire departments, the Winchester Board of Health, the Town Clerk, the Post Office, Water and Sewer Department, and the Public Works Department.

Winchester does not offer curbside trash collection. Residents must get an annual permit and use the "Transfer Station" to dispose of their trash and for recycling.

Winchester also has a Chamber of Commerce located on the platform of the Winchester Center station of the MBTA Commuter Rail.

== Points of interest ==
- Middlesex Fells Reservation
- Wright-Locke Farm
- John Mason House
- Sanborn House
- Griffin Museum of Photography
- Capt. Josiah Locke House

== Sister city ==
Winchester is the sister city of St. Germain-en-Laye, France.

== Notable people ==
- Lars Ahlfors (1907–1996), mathematician and Fields Medalist
- Joe Bellino, Heisman Trophy-winning football player at the United States Naval Academy
- Bob Bigelow, retired NBA basketball player
- Fischer Black (1938–1995), mathematician and economist
- Ray Bonneville, musician
- Robert A. Brown (born 1951), president of Boston University
- Anthony Carrigan, actor
- John Cazale, actor, played Fredo in The Godfather
- Allan McLeod Cormack (1924–1998), one of the recipients of the 1979 Nobel Prize in Physiology or Medicine
- Kieran Corr, All-American football player at Harvard University
- John M. Corse, general; hero of Southern campaigns in the Civil War
- Bill Cummings, philanthropist and real estate magnate
- Glen Doherty, former United States Navy SEAL and CIA contractor killed during the 2012 Benghazi attack of the US embassy; portrayed by Toby Stephens in 13 Hours: The Secret Soldiers of Benghazi
- Janet Doub Erickson, co-founder of the Blockhouse of Boston, artist, and author; her grandfather William McIntosh was Winchester's first chief of police
- Edward Everett (1794–1865), president of Harvard University, governor of Massachusetts, and ambassador to Britain
- Jon Favreau, speechwriter for President Barack Obama
- Vic Fazio, member of the United States House of Representatives from California 1979–1999, chair of the House Democratic Caucus 1995–1999
- Vic Firth, musician, creator of Vic Firth drumsticks
- Edward Gelsthorpe (1923–2009), marketing executive known as "Cranapple Ed" for his best-known product launch
- Edwin Ginn (until 1914), founder of Ginn and Company, Athenaeum Press, and World Peace Foundation
- Arthur Griffin (1903–2001), photographer and founder of Griffin Museum of Photography
- Brian A. Joyce, politician and lawyer
- Brian Keefe, professional basketball coach
- Kim Khazei, anchorwoman, WHDH-TV
- Kofi Kingston, ring name of Kofi Nahaje Sarkodie-Mensah, professional wrestler
- Corey Kluber, Major League Baseball pitcher
- Louise Le Baron (née Shepherd), contralto
- Ed Leslie, former WWF wrestler, and some-time tag team partner of fellow wrestler Hulk Hogan
- Jason Lewis, legislator serving in the Massachusetts House of Representatives
- Yo-Yo Ma, cellist and composer
- Julia Marino, American-raised Paraguayan freestyle skiing athlete and the first Winter Olympian to represent Paraguay
- Pedro Martínez, Major League Baseball pitcher
- Stephanie McCaffrey, professional soccer player for the Boston Breakers and the United States Women's National Team
- Samuel W. McCall, ten-time United States congressman and three-time governor of Massachusetts
- Mark A. Milley, chairman of the Joint Chiefs of Staff
- Glen Murray, NHL player for the Boston Bruins
- Laurence Owen, national skating champion whose career was cut short by the plane crash that wiped out the national team in 1961
- Mike Pagliarulo, ex-pro baseball player for the Minnesota Twins and New York Yankees
- Jay Pandolfo, NHL player
- Harry Parker, Olympic rower/coach and current coach of Harvard crew
- Louise Pearce (1885–1959), pathologist
- Rand Pecknold, Quinnipiac men's ice hockey coach and 500-game winner in NCAA ice hockey
- Richard Phillips, merchant mariner who served as captain of the MV Maersk Alabama during its hijacking by Somali pirates in April 2009; portrayed by Tom Hanks in the 2013 film Captain Phillips
- Bjorn Poonen (born 1968), mathematician
- John Quinlan, champion bodybuilder and professional wrestler
- Paul Reid, journalist and author, co-author of The Last Lion: Winston Spencer Churchill
- Hartley Rogers, Jr. (1926–2015), mathematician
- Alicia Sacramone, ten-time Gymnastics World Championships medalist and 2008 Olympic silver medalist
- Ed Sandford, forward for the Boston Bruins, and briefly captain of the team
- Richard R. Schrock, one of the recipients of the 2005 Nobel Prize in Chemistry
- Claude Shannon (1916–2001), mathematician, electrical engineer, and "father of information theory"
- Conor Sheary, professional ice hockey player
- Harry Sinden, former GM and coach of the Boston Bruins
- Whitney Smith, founder of the North American Vexillological Association and designer of the flag of Guyana
- Pitirim Sorokin, Russian-American sociologist and an academic and political activist in Russia
- Dan Spang, professional ice hockey defenseman
- Richard Stoltzman, clarinetist
- Max Tegmark (born 1967), cosmologist
- Maribel Vinson, nine-time national champion figure skater
- Brad Whitford, guitarist with Aerosmith
- Brian Wilson, baseball relief pitcher

== General references ==
- History of Winchester, Massachusetts by H. S. Chapman and Bruce W. Stone (1936, 1975)
- Ladies Home Journal, Aug. 1975
