= Lowell station =

Transit station in Lowell, Massachusetts, US

Lowell
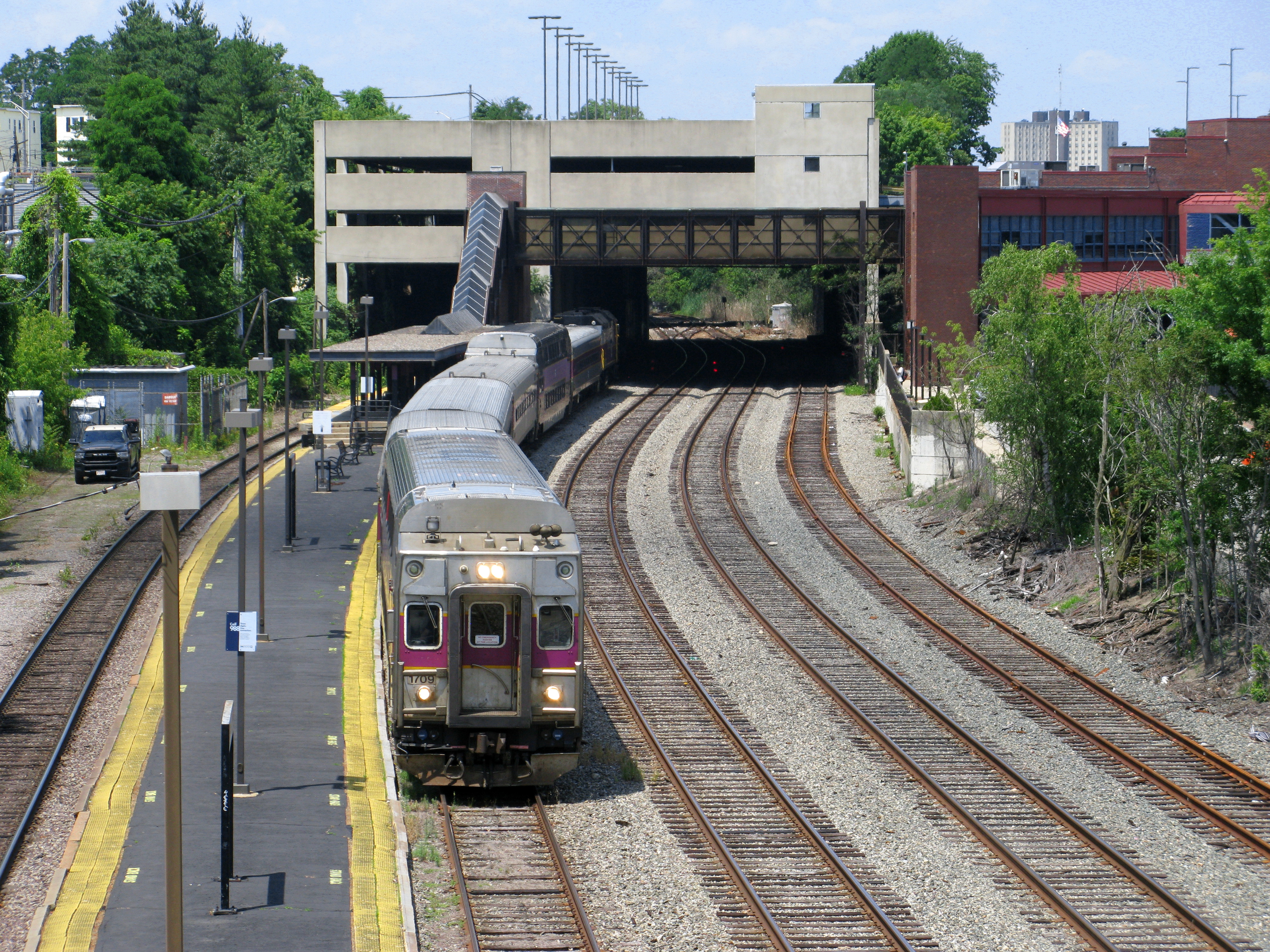
- A Lowell Line train at the station in 2026

General information
- Location: 101 Thorndike Street (Route 3A); Lowell, Massachusetts
- Coordinates: 42.6366°N 71.3148°W
- Owner: Lowell Regional Transit Authority
- Line: New Hampshire Route Main Line
- Platforms: 1 island platform
- Tracks: 5
- Connections: LRTA: 1, 2, 3, 4, 5, 6, 7, 8, 9, 10, 11, 12, 13, 14, 15, 16, 17, 18, 19, 20; MVRTA: 24

Construction
- Parking: 695 spaces ($8.00 fee)
- Cycle facilities: 18 spaces
- Accessible: Yes

Other information
- Fare zone: 6 (MBTA)

History
- Rebuilt: 1983

Passengers
- 2024: 977 daily boardings

Services
Preceding station	MBTA	Following station
Terminus	Lowell Line	North Billerica toward North Station
Former services
Preceding station	MBTA	Following station
Nashua toward Concord	Lowell Line	North Billerica toward North Station
Preceding station	Boston and Maine Railroad	Following station
Middlesex toward Concord, NH	Boston – Concord, NH	Bleachery toward Boston
Terminus	Lexington Branch	Bleachery toward Boston
Middlesex toward Worcester	Worcester – Lowell	Terminus
Preceding station	New York, New Haven and Hartford Railroad	Following station
Chelmsford toward Framingham	Framingham–Lowell	Terminus
Location

Lowell station, officially the Charles A. Gallagher Transit Terminal, is an intermodal transit station in Lowell, Massachusetts. It is located off Thorndike Street (Route 3A) near the end of the Lowell Connector south of downtown Lowell. The station is the northern terminal of the MBTA Commuter Rail Lowell Line, with three garages for park and ride purposes. The adjacent Robert B. Kennedy Bus Transfer Center is the hub for Lowell Regional Transit Authority local bus service. The station complex is accessible, with elevators connecting the station building to the rail platform.

== History ==
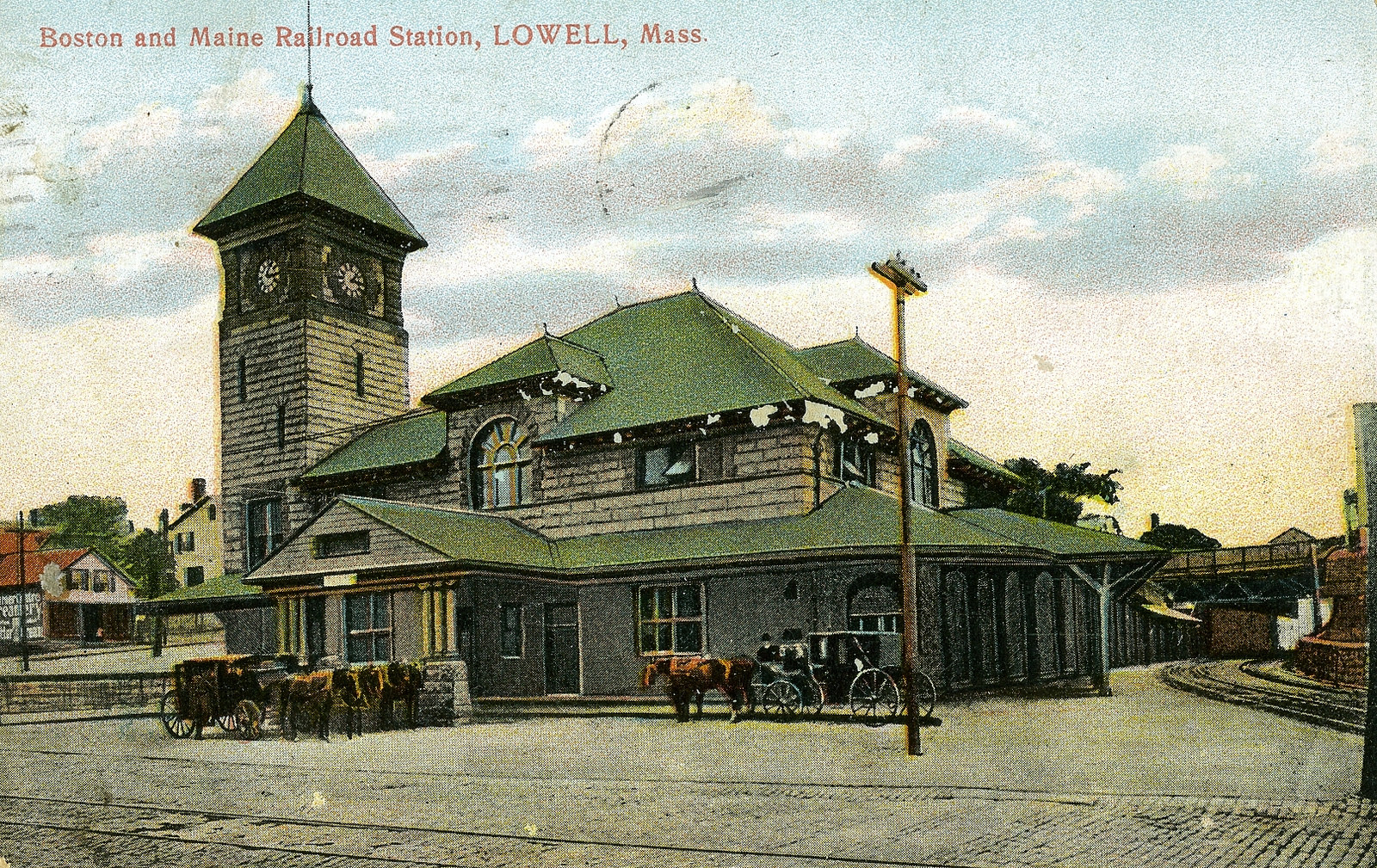
Union Station, Lowell's main railroad station from 1894 to the 1950s

The Boston and Lowell Railroad (B&L) opened to Lowell in 1835, with a station downtown near Merrimack Street. The Nashua and Lowell Railroad opened in 1838. Union Station was opened at Middlesex Street in 1848 so that through trains did not have to back into the downtown station. It was also used by the Lowell and Lawrence Railroad (opened 1848), Salem and Lowell Railroad (opened 1850), and Framingham and Lowell Railroad (opened 1870). All except the Framingham and Lowell were under control of the B&L from 1858 onwards. The original downtown station was replaced in 1853 by Merrimack Street station, which also held city offices and the Huntington Hall auditorium.

The Lowell and Andover Railroad was opened by B&L rival Boston and Maine Railroad (B&M) in 1874. It did not connect with the B&L system, instead following the east bank of the Concord River to Central Street station, which was located at Central Street and Green Street. The B&M acquired the B&L in 1887 and constructed a new Union Station at the same site in 1894. B&M trains switched from Central Street station to Union Station the next year. Merrimack Street station was closed in 1905, leaving only Union Station.

As well as local service, Union Station was also a stop for intercity service. Most of these trains were jointly operated by the B&M and connecting railroads. They included Boston–Montreal services (Alouette, Ambassador, New Englander, Red Wing) and New York City–Maine services (Bar Harbor Express, Down Easter, East Wind, State of Maine). Montreal and Maine service ended by 1960, leaving just Boston–Lowell commuter service plus limited New Hampshire service (which ended in 1967).

Union Station was demolished in the 1950s for a road construction project. A small station was constructed about 1/4 mile (0.40 km) to the south. The Charles A. Gallagher Transit Terminal opened in 1983 at that site. It included a brick station building, a parking garage, and a footbridge to an island platform. A second parking garage was added in the 1990s. In 2005, the Robert B. Kennedy Bus Transfer Center opened at the Gallagher Terminal as a new hub for all LRTA bus routes. A third parking garage located over the tracks opened around that time.

Both elevators at the station were out of service from April 8 to June 1, 2026, for repairs. Accessible van service operated between North Billerica and Lowell during the outage.
