= Salem station (MBTA) =

Rail station in Salem, Massachusetts, US

Salem
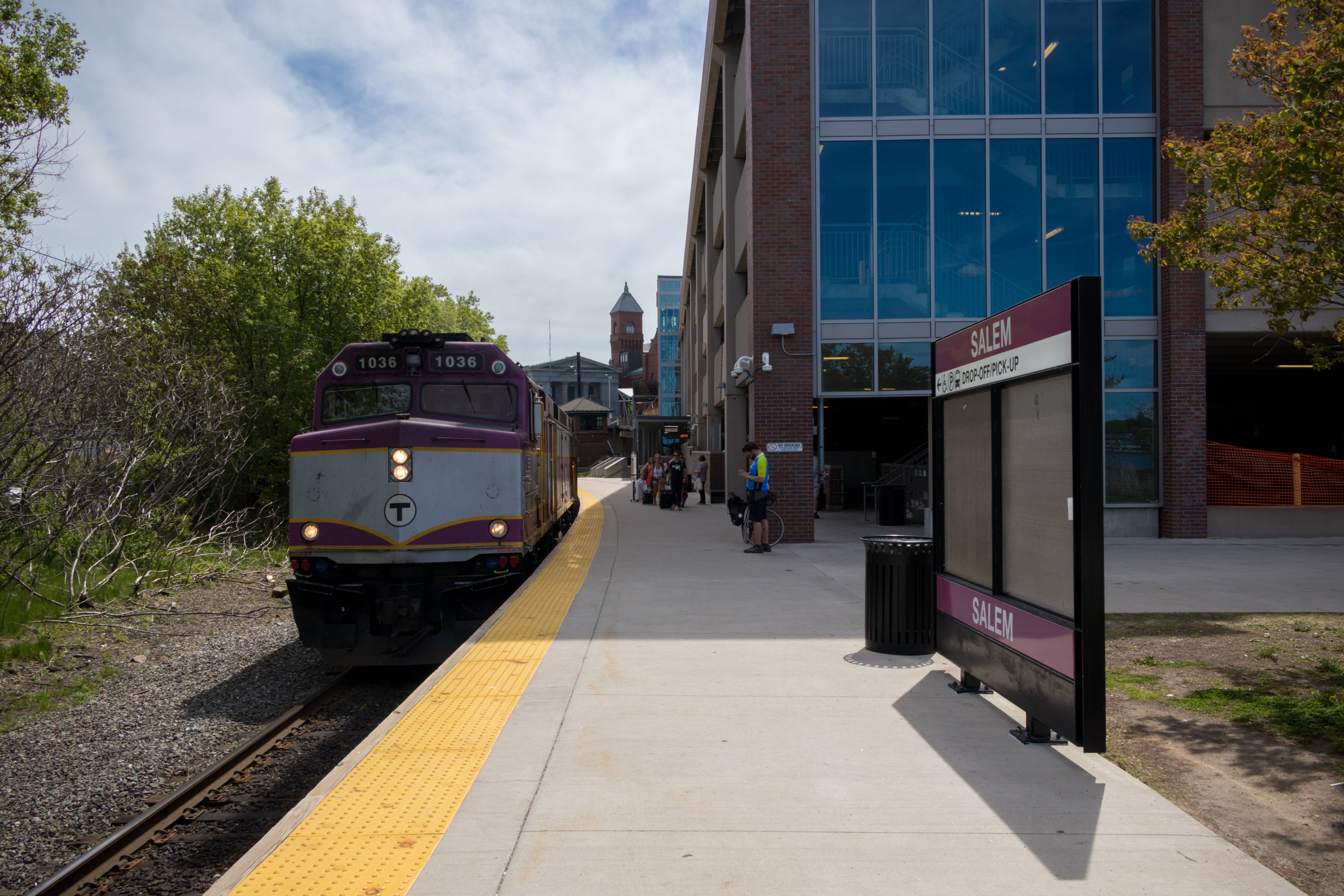
- The platform and garage at Salem station in 2022

General information
- Location: 252 Bridge Street (Route 107); Salem, Massachusetts
- Coordinates: 42°31′30″N 70°53′45″W
- Lines: Eastern Route, Peabody Branch
- Platforms: 1 side platform
- Tracks: 1
- Connections: MBTA bus: 435, 450, 450W, 451, 455, 456

Construction
- Parking: 700 spaces ($5.00 daily)
- Cycle facilities: 100+ spaces ("Pedal and Park" bicycle cage)
- Accessible: Yes

Other information
- Fare zone: 3

History
- Opened: August 27, 1838
- Rebuilt: December 1, 1847; August 1, 1958; August 10, 1987; October 24, 2014

Passengers
- 2024: 1,739 daily boardings

Services
Preceding station	MBTA	Following station
Swampscott toward North Station	Newburyport/Rockport Line	Beverly toward Newburyport or Rockport
Former services
Preceding station	Boston and Maine Railroad	Following station
Swampscott toward Boston	Eastern Route	Beverly toward Portland
Location

Salem station is an MBTA Commuter Rail station served by the Newburyport/Rockport Line. The station is located off Bridge Street (Route 107) near its interchange with North Street (Route 114) at the north end of downtown Salem, Massachusetts. The station has a single accessible full-length high-level platform serving the single track of the Eastern Route. Just south of the station is the Salem Tunnel, which carries the line under Washington Street. Salem is a major park and ride center, with a 700-space parking garage, as well as an MBTA bus terminal. It is the busiest commuter rail station in the MBTA system outside of the central Boston stations, with an average of 2,326 daily boardings in a 2018 count.

The Eastern Railroad opened between Salem and East Boston in August 1838. The first passenger accommodations were a ticket office and waiting room inside a warehouse; a wooden station was soon built. An extension to Ipswich (including the Salem Tunnel) and a branch to Marblehead opened in December 1839. In December 1847, the railroad opened a massive castle-like stone station designed by Gridley James Fox Bryant. The opening of the Essex Railroad in 1847, followed by the South Reading Branch Railroad and the Salem and Lowell Railroad in 1850, made Salem a major railroad junction. A yard with a roundhouse and coaling tower was built in the wye between the Eastern and the Essex. The Boston and Maine Railroad (B&M) controlled the Eastern and the other lines meeting at Salem by 1887.

In the late 1940s, the B&M and the state began a three-part project to eliminate grade crossings in the downtown area. Overpasses for Bridge Street and North Street, the former acting as an extension of the tunnel, were completed in the early 1950s. The B&M began demolition of the station in October 1954 to make way for a southward expansion of the tunnel to eliminate the last two grade crossings. The extended tunnel opened in August 1958 along with a new station, which had platforms in the trench south of the tunnel and a brick station building at street level. Service on the branch lines connecting to Salem declined in the 20th century, with the final branch service to Marblehead ending in 1959. In January 1965, the 1964-formed Massachusetts Bay Transportation Authority (MBTA) began subsidizing some B&M suburban service, including the Eastern Route.

After a fire destroyed the bridge to Beverly in November 1984, the former rail yard at the north end of the tunnel was used as a temporary station to connect to buses, which replaced the northern branches of the line until December 1985. In August 1987, as part of a larger project to improve the line, the MBTA opened an accessible permanent station at the site, replacing the non-accessible station to the south. After years of planning, construction of the parking garage and new platform began in June 2013. The garage and part of the platform opened in October 2014, with construction continuing into 2015. Proposals by the MBTA and the city of Peabody have called for passenger service to be restored from Salem to Peabody and Danvers.

== Station layout ==
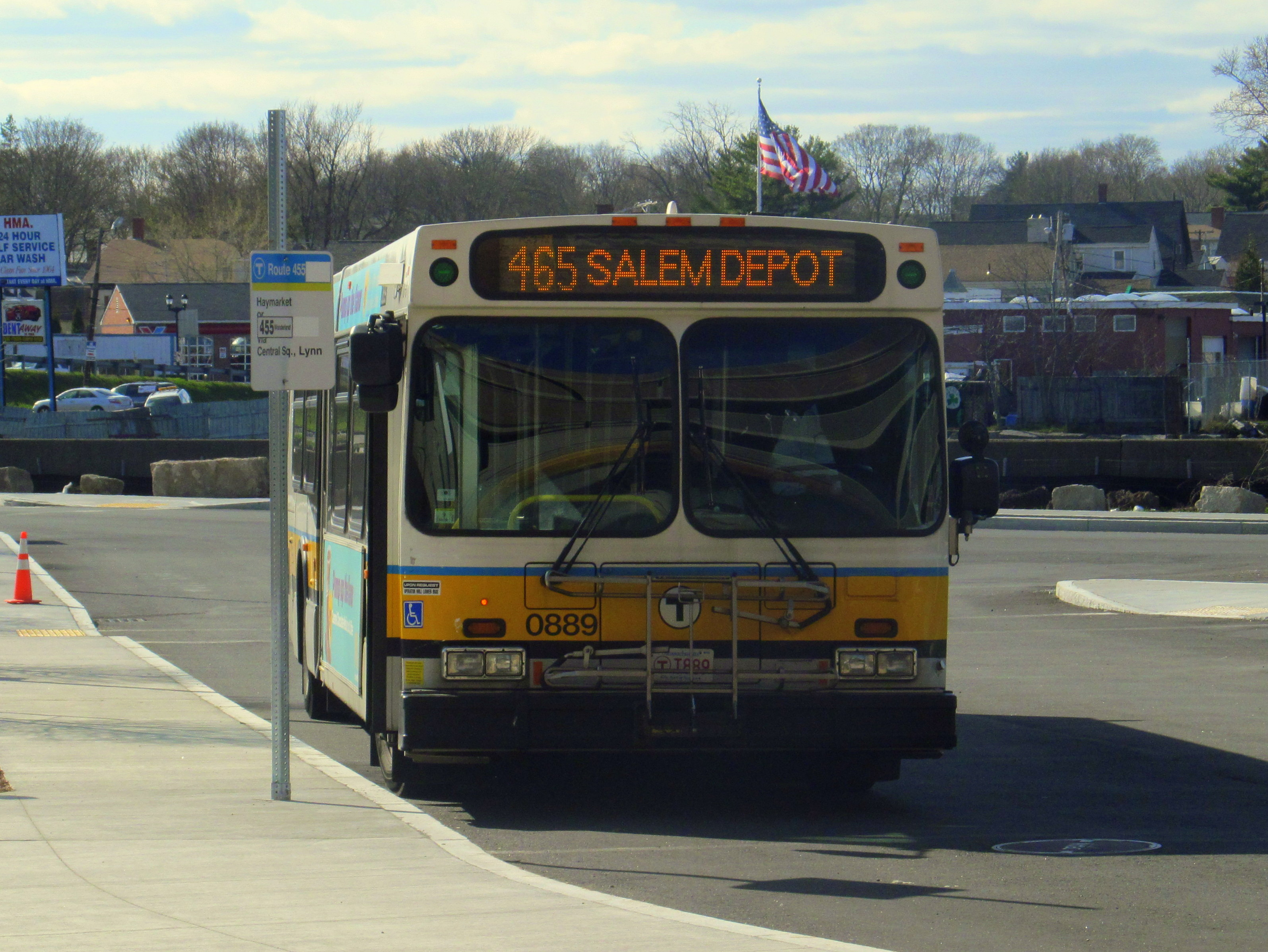
A route 465 bus at Salem in April 2015

The station is located on a triangular plot of land at the north end of downtown Salem, bordered by Bridge Street (Route 107) on the south, the MBTA track on the east, and the North River on the northwest. The station is fully accessible; a curved 800-foot (240 m)-long high-level side platform serves the single track of the Eastern Route on which the Newburyport/Rockport Line runs. Just south of the station, the track enters the 0.4-mile (0.64 km)-long Salem Tunnel, which runs under Washington Street through the downtown area. A preserved interlocking tower is located near the tunnel portal.

The eastern half of the site is occupied by a 700-space, five-story parking garage. A bicycle cage and passenger waiting room are located on the first floor of the garage. A footbridge connects the garage and platform to Bridge Street. The western half of the site includes a surface parking lot, a kiss-and-ride lane, a busway and taxi lane, and an access road from Bridge Street. The single track of the freight-only Peabody Branch parallels the river on the northwest.

Salem serves as a terminal for several MBTA bus routes – 435, 450, 450W, 451, 455, and 456 – serving Salem, Danvers, Peabody, and Beverly.

== History ==
=== First station ===
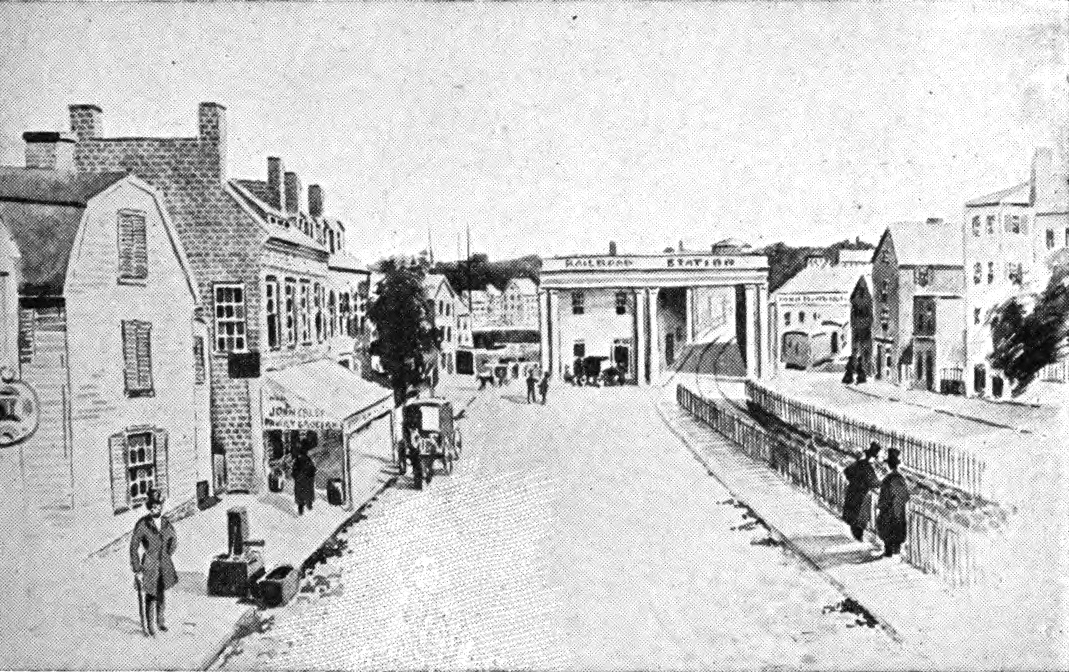
A drawing of the first station in Salem

After the railroads from Boston to Lowell, Worcester, and Providence were chartered in 1830 and 1831, railroads to other surrounding cities including Newburyport and Portsmouth were soon proposed. The Eastern Railroad was chartered on April 14, 1836. Work began at East Boston in late 1836; construction was slowed by the Panic of 1837 and did not reach Salem until 1838.

Service from Salem to East Boston began on August 27, 1838, with fares half that of competing stagecoaches. A wooden train shed was built at Salem; since it was not certain whether the line would be extended, the shed was closed at the north end. Passenger accommodations were initially limited to a ticket office and waiting room in a nearby warehouse. A wooden station similar to those at Lynn and East Boston was soon constructed near Norman Street, with bells imported from Spanish churches. The two-story station had three pairs of columns mimicking a Greek temple, a common style for the earliest stations in the northeast United States. Within days of opening, the line was already seeing commuter traffic from Salem, and it has been a heavily used commuter stop since.

With the railroad receiving more traffic than expected, a branch line from Salem to Marblehead opened on December 10, 1839, replacing a stagecoach connection from Marblehead station on the mainline. Salem was the terminus of the Eastern Railroad until December 18, 1839, when the extension to Ipswich opened as the first phase of the line's completion to Portsmouth, New Hampshire. The extension to Ipswich included a 718-foot (219 m) tunnel under Washington Street in Salem - one of the nation's first railroad tunnels. At the time, it was among the largest granite structures in New England. The unlit tunnel was "happily known as the 'Kissing-Bridge' of this route, and the locale of more than one bright osculatory poem."

=== Second station ===
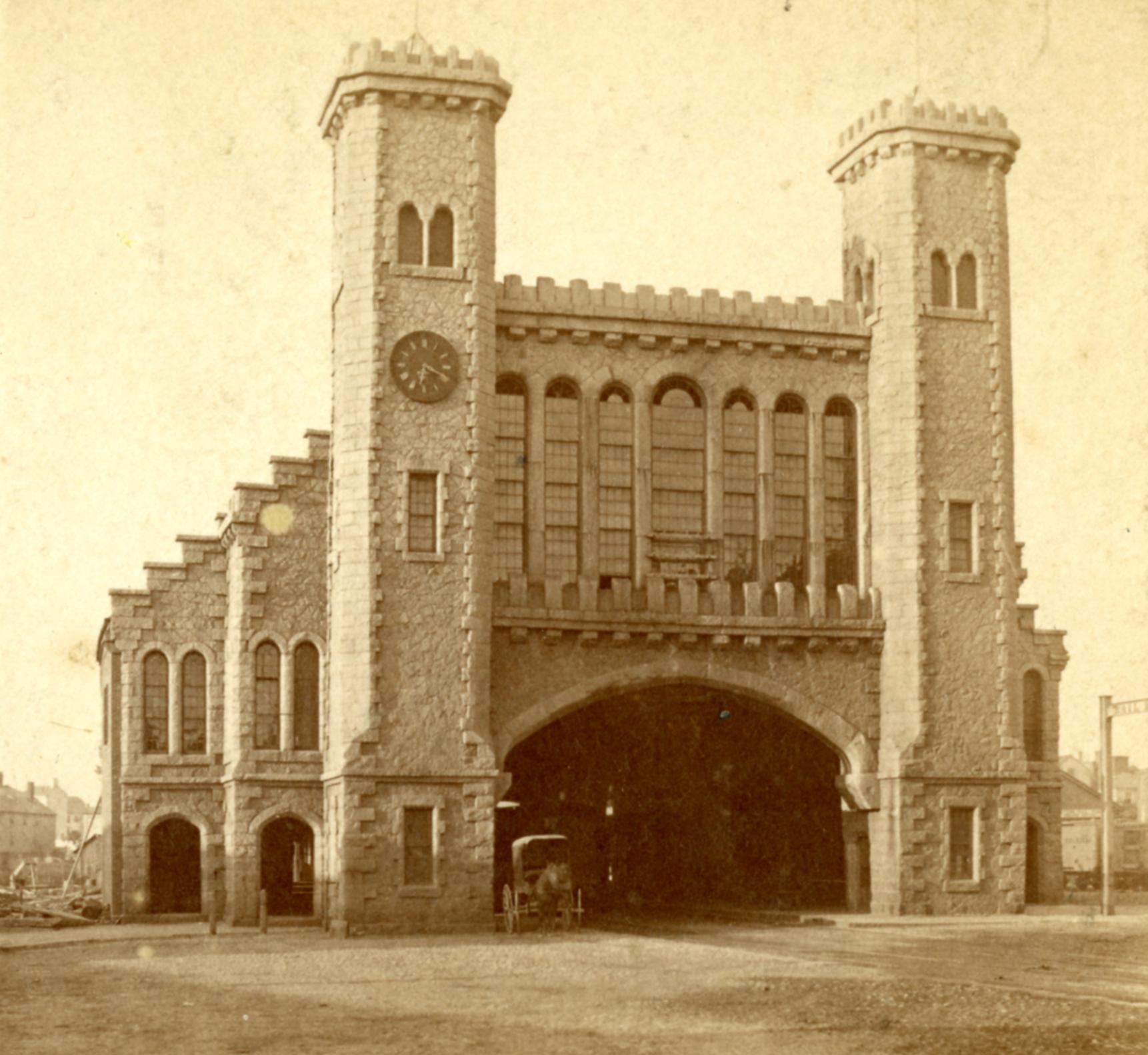
The 1847-built station in 1873

On June 16, 1846, the Eastern Railroad stockholders authorized the sale of $450,000 of new stock to fund various branch lines plus new depots at Salem and Lynn. Gridley James Fox Bryant designed a massive stone structure, one of his first major commissions. Eastern president D.A. Neal requested the style after being inspired by a similar station - possibly English, possibly the 1844-built Leipzig Thüringer Bahnhof - during a European trip. The Washington Street side of the new station had two towers, resembling those of a medieval castle, flanking a granite archway which spanned three tracks. The wooden trainshed was constructed to the south, partially on piers over the South River (which was not filled until the 1880s). A massive sea wall was built to protect the station from flooding. The station opened on December 1, 1847. In 1851, Nathaniel Hawthorne described the station in The House of the Seven Gables:

...they now found themselves passing beneath the arched entrance of a large structure of gray stone. Within, there was a spacious breadth, and an airy height from floor to roof, now partially filled with smoke and steam, which eddied voluminously upward, and formed a mimic cloud-region over their heads.

Map of lines and stations in Salem

The first 5 miles (8.0 km) of the Essex Railroad from Salem west to Danvers opened on January 19, 1847, with a wye connecting to the Eastern Railroad at the north end of the tunnel, and the remainder to North Andover in 1848. The South Reading Branch Railroad and the Salem and Lowell Railroad (a subsidiary of the Lawrence and Lowell Railroad) opened in 1850 and used the Essex's tracks between Peabody and Salem. The South Reading Branch was built to compete with the Eastern for Boston-Salem traffic; it connected to the rival Boston and Maine Railroad (B&M) at South Reading (Wakefield Junction). The Salem and Lowell and the South Reading Branch shared a station at the north end of the tunnel rather than using the Eastern's station, even after the Eastern acquired the South Reading Branch in 1851. The Salem and Lowell extended north from the station to the Salem Harbor Branch, which intermittently served a coal port.

With direct connections to most of the major cities of northeastern Massachusetts by 1850, Salem became a major railroad junction. By the 1870s, a roundhouse, coaling tower, and water tank were located inside the wye to serve the three lines from the west. This was expanded into a large repair shop; the roundhouse was later rebuilt with more stalls and access from the south to serve commuter trains. A large freight yard was located south of downtown. Other minor passenger stations were located in Salem at various times: Grove Street, Carltonville, and North Street on the Essex Railroad; Castle Hill (Atlantic) at the junction of the Eastern and the Marblehead Branch; Pickman Park on the Eastern; and Loring Avenue and Forest River on the Marblehead Branch.

On April 7, 1882, a fire resulting from an explosion of a can of fusees destroyed the wooden trainshed, although the granite facade and towers were intact. A wooden replacement was built around the burnt section. On December 2, 1884, the Eastern was acquired by the B&M. When the B&M acquired the Boston and Lowell Railroad (which by then owned the Salem and Lowell) in 1887, it controlled all lines serving Salem. For much of the early 20th century, Salem was the turnback point for a limited number of short turn trains. The tunnel flooded on several occasions, including 1898 and 1927, due to during high tides and storm surges on the North River.

The B&M proposed an electrified four-track tunnel in 1910 as part of plans to quadruple-track and grade-separate the Eastern Route from Boston to Beverly. However, these plans were left unfulfilled after New Haven Railroad control of the B&M ended in 1914; only a section at Lynn was built. In 1921, a Boston engineering firm proposed to extend the tunnel south to the station site, resulting in a two-level Washington Street, and to rebuild the station at the same location.

Railroad traffic began declining after World War I due to competition from streetcars and private automobiles. Passenger service on the South Reading Branch, largely redundant after the B&M consolidation, ended on January 2, 1926. Service on the eastern part of the Salem and Lowell ended in 1932. Passenger service on the Essex was cut back to Salem–Danvers in 1926; that service lasted until massive B&M service cuts on May 18, 1958. Marblehead service was halved to one daily round trip during the 1958 cuts, and cut entirely on June 14, 1959. For a brief period, Portsmouth trains were combined with Rockport trains at Salem.

=== New tunnel and station ===
Map of the various station locations and tunnel segments

By the 1940s, the grade crossings at Norman Street and Mill Street bracketing the depot, plus Bridge Street (Route 107) and North Street (Route 114) nearby, had long been a nuisance and hazard in the busy downtown. A plan to lengthen the tunnel and demolish the station received Works Progress Administration funds in 1938, but it was not enacted. In 1949, then-mayor Joseph B. Harrington called the crossings "the worst hazard in any city in the United States." Construction of a $2.5 million overpass to carry Bridge Street over the railroad was begun in 1948 and completed in 1951. It effectively extended the tunnel northwards by 350 feet (110 m), with separate north portals for the Eastern Route mainline and the Danvers Branch (ex-Essex Railroad). A $1.35 million overpass carrying North Street over the Danvers Branch was completed around 1953.

The third part of the project was a $6 million southward extension of the tunnel to Mill Street, for a total length of about 2,170 feet (660 m). The original tunnel was the only remaining single-track section between Boston and Newburyport; despite a push from the mayor, the B&M declined to widen it to two tracks. The B&M decided to demolish the old station over the protests of local preservationists, who wished to see the facade reused as the entrance to an underground station or as a museum. Demolition began on October 22, 1954 and lasted for months. Service through Salem was maintained during the entire project; temporary platforms near the former station were used after demolition.

A 1,500-foot (460 m)-long dike was constructed along the north waterfront to prevent recurrences of the previous North River floods. (Despite this, the tunnel flooded in 1961 and 1976 from broken city water mains.) The north part of the new tunnel was constructed just to the west of the south part of the old tunnel. Beginning in May 1957, the roof of the old tunnel was removed to allow the two to be connected. Trains began using the new tunnel and station on August 1, 1958, though construction was not yet complete. Located south of Mill Street, the station had two 800-foot (240 m)-long side platforms in the trench at the southern portal of the new tunnel. A 36-by-136-foot (11 m × 41 m) one-story brick station building was constructed on the west side of the tracks. Stairs connected the platforms to a footbridge behind the station building, as well as to Mill Street. The former station area was paved over as Riley Plaza, named after Medal of Honor recipient John Phillip Riley, with some 400 parking spaces. A three-day celebration was held on June 5–7, 1959 to celebrate the completion of the project. The lengthy construction, during which many business on Washington Street were difficult to reach, resulted in at least 17 of them going bankrupt; however, business increased soon after the project was completed.

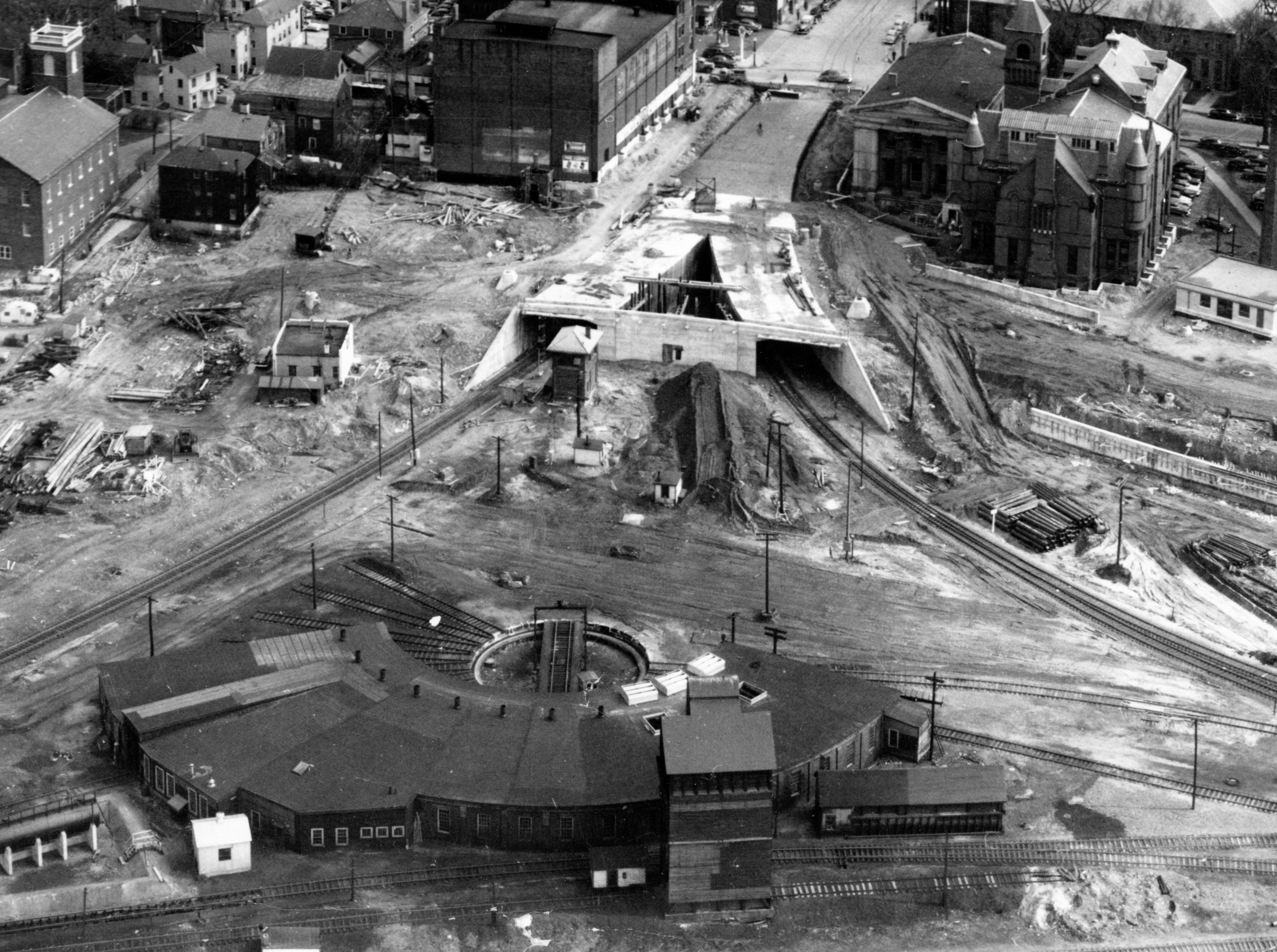
Bridge Street overpass construction and the roundhouse, 1951

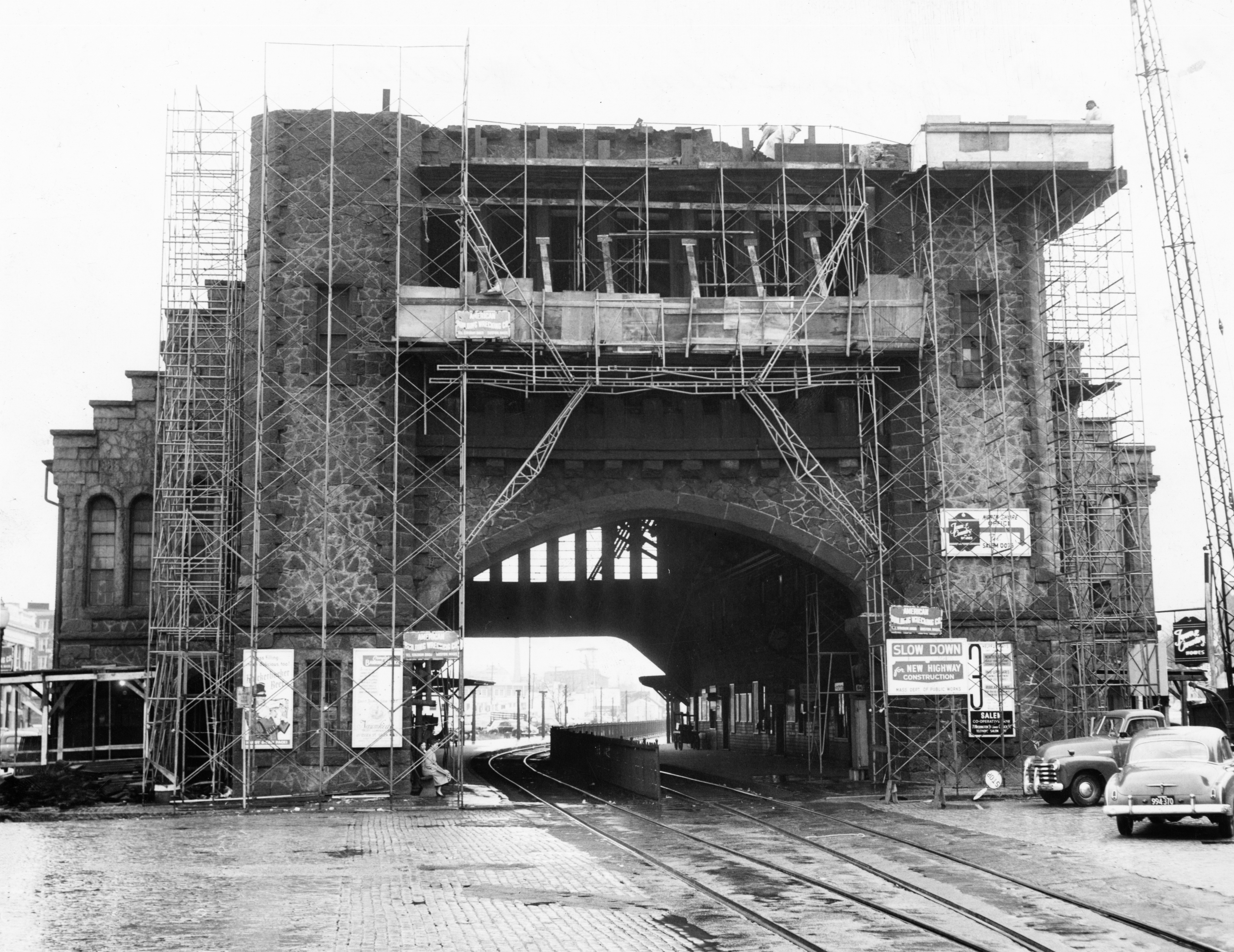
Demolition of the station, 1954

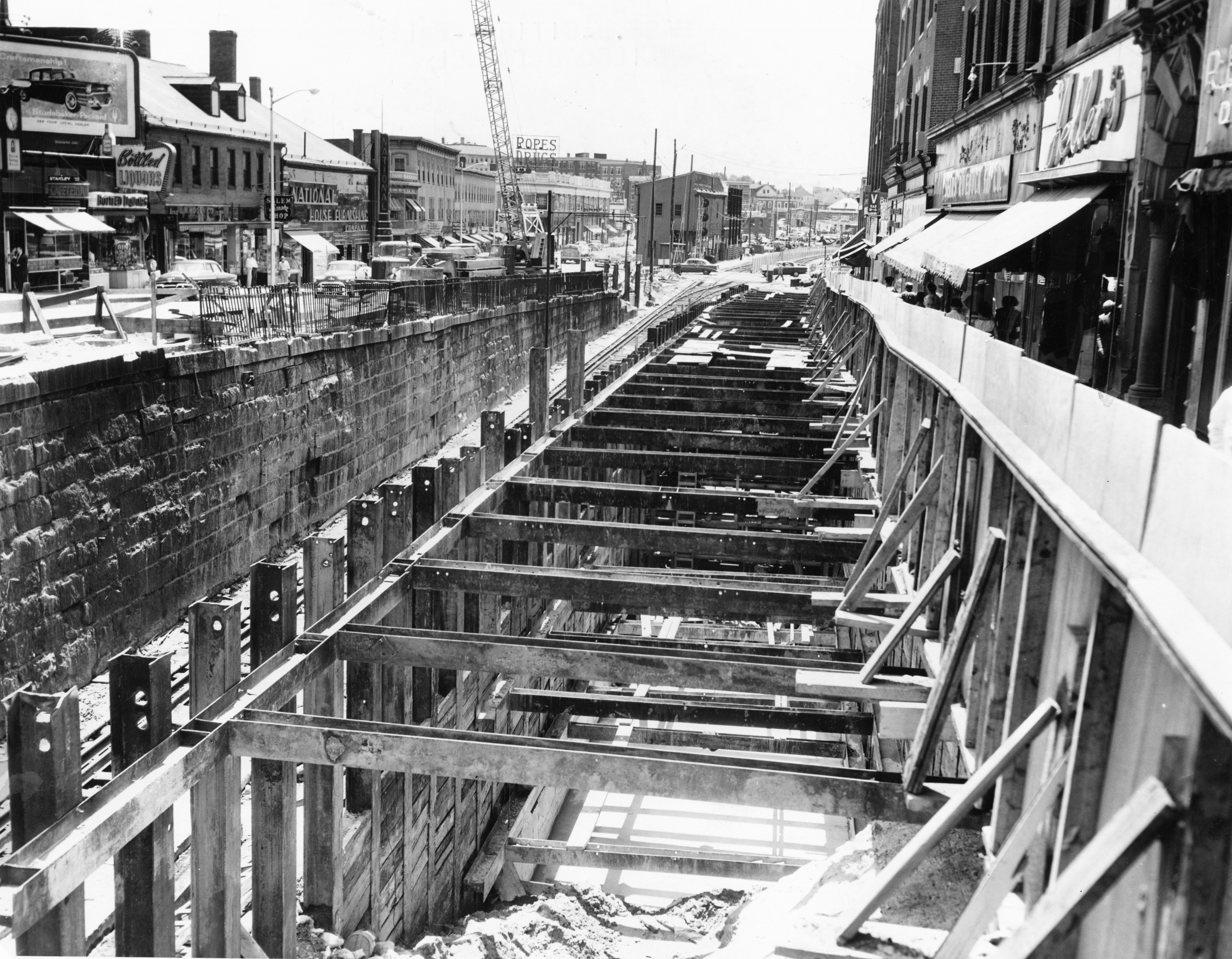
Tunnel expansion construction, 1957

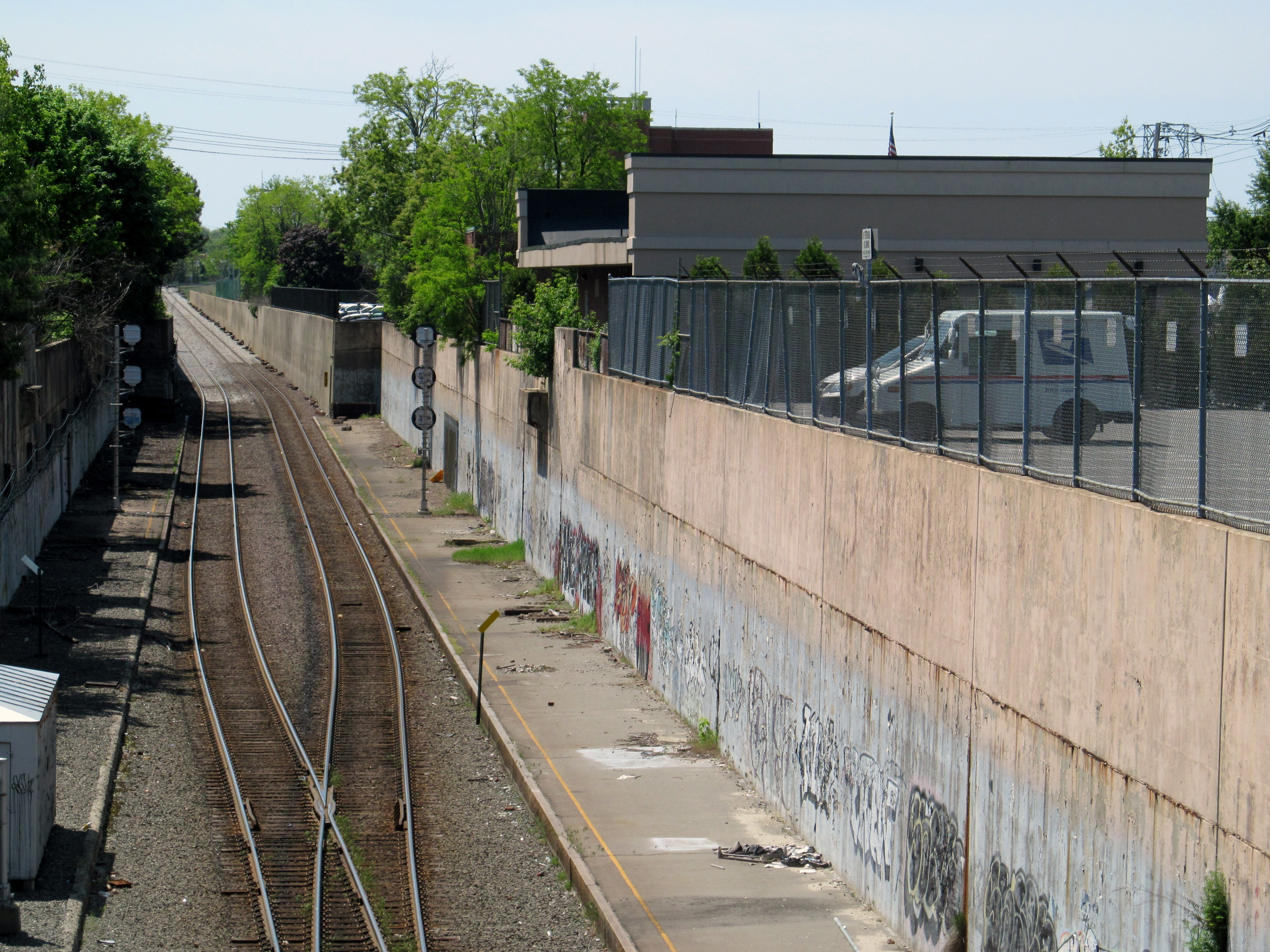
Abandoned platforms and reused station building, 2012

=== MBTA era ===
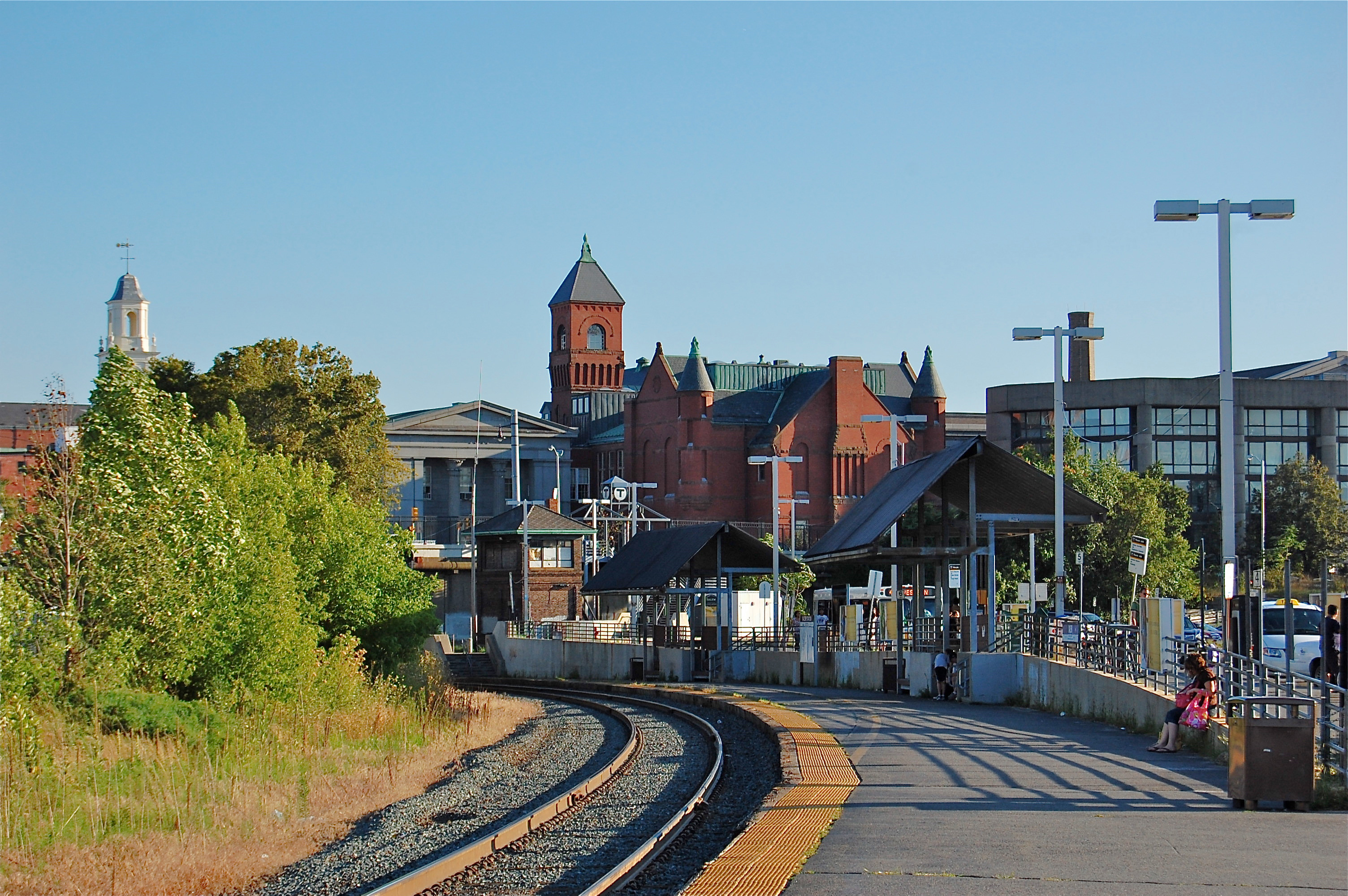
The 1987-built station viewed in 2010

The Massachusetts Bay Transportation Authority (MBTA) was formed in August 1964 to subsidize suburban commuter rail service. On January 18, 1965, the MBTA began subsidizing service on the Eastern Route through Salem to Hamilton/Wenham and Manchester. (These were extended to Ipswich and Rockport that June.) On December 27, 1976, the MBTA bought the B&M commuter rail lines and equipment, including the Eastern Route. The line became known as the Ipswich/Rockport Line (after the 1998 resumption of service to Newburyport, the Newburyport/Rockport Line).

Because the newer tunnel was less tall than the original, the B&M was forced to move certain high freight cars over the Danvers Branch and the Topsfield Branch. This was the case until November 16, 1984, when a fire destroyed the wooden railroad bridge over the Danvers River between Salem and Beverly. The MBTA constructed a temporary station over the weekend in the former B&M yard at North Street; 280 parking spots were added. Shuttle buses serving Ipswich met curtailed Boston–Salem trains there; shuttle buses from Beverly (serving Rockport–Beverly shuttle trains) met trains at Thorndike Street near the bridge. On January 7, 1985, Rockport shuttle trains were discontinued and all bus/train connections were made at North Street. Passenger service to Beverly and beyond over the new bridge began on December 1, 1985. However, freight service was not resumed over the new bridge. Until 2023, Pan Am Railways operated limited local freight service through Salem via the tunnel, using the ex-Essex and ex-South Reading to reach the Rousselot Plant in Peabody.

In 1984, the MBTA began a $160 million project to rebuild the Rockport and Ipswich lines. A new Salem station was constructed at the north end of the tunnel where the temporary station had been. It included a mini-high platform which made the station accessible. (The old station, located in a trench, would have been difficult to retrofit for accessibility.) The new station, with 235 dedicated parking spaces, opened on August 10, 1987. Bus routes that previously terminated in downtown Salem were extended to the new station that September. The old station building remains extant; its exterior was heavily modified in 2003 for use as a restaurant, and it was converted to a private school in 2006.

==== Garage ====
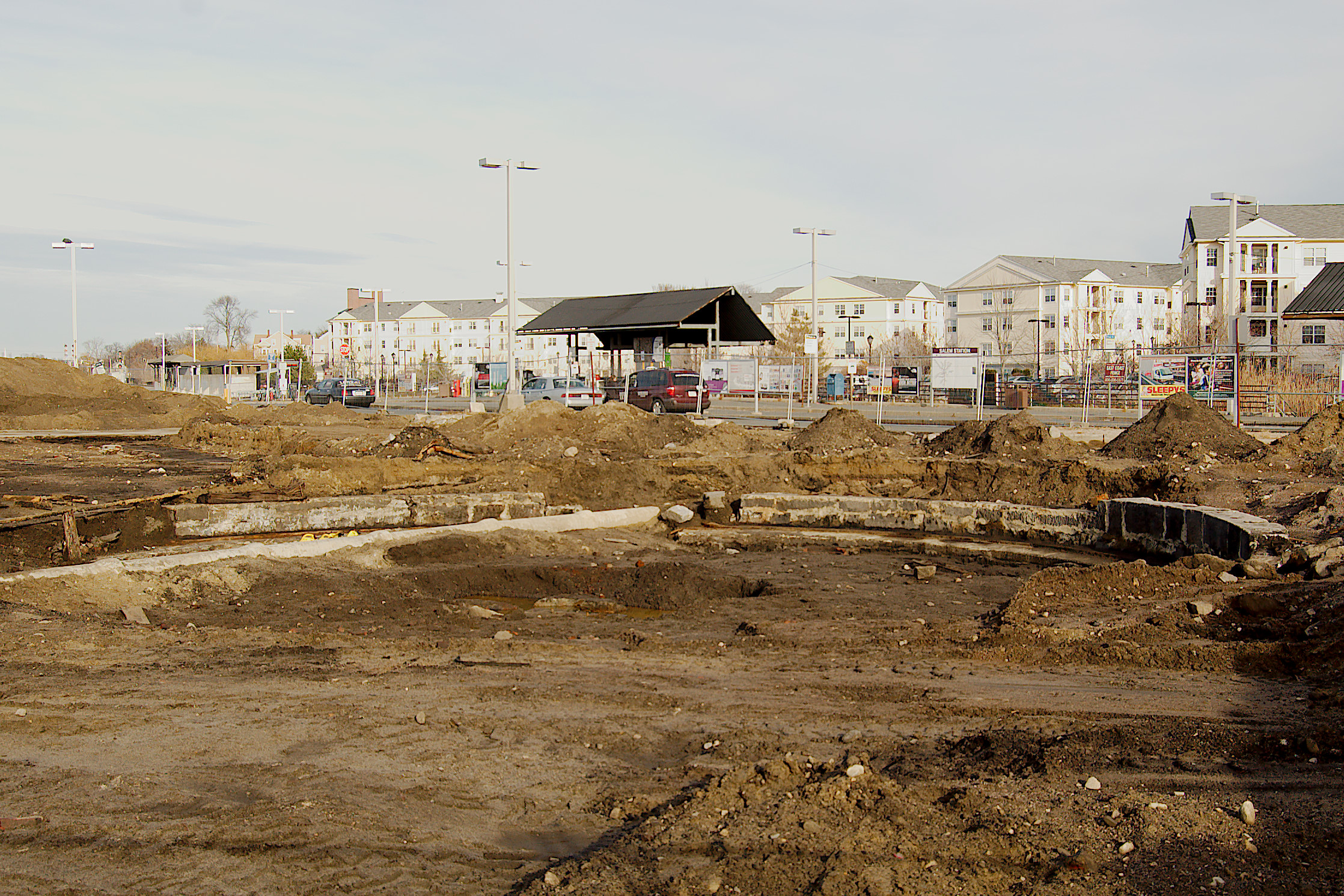
The turntable foundation with the 1987-built shelter in the background in December 2012

Parking was formerly available in a 340-space surface lot adjacent to the platform, which filled before the end of morning rush hour. The MBTA first considered the construction of a parking garage in August 1988 and advertised for a design contractor in October 1995. In October 1997, Salem was again identified as a possible site for a parking garage. The project was cancelled in 1998 because of concerns by the city about the design. In 2003, the MBTA again began studying construction of a parking garage. In 2004, Salem was ranked as one of three highest-priority parking expansions on the system. Funding for the garage was committed in October 2009.

As part of environmental mitigation for increased urban auto traffic enabled by the Big Dig, the state was required to add 1,000 parking spaces to MBTA stations by the end of 2011. Garages at Salem and Beverly Depot were originally to fill this requirement, but when it became clear that neither would be finished in 2011, additional parking at Wonderland, Woodland, Savin Hill, the Quincy ferry terminal, and a surface lot at Beverly Depot were used to satisfy it. However, planning continued for a garage and new platform at Salem. Funding was provided by the Federal Transit Administration ($3.6 million), the Massachusetts Department of Capital Asset Management ($3 million to reserve 150 spaces for the Essex County Courthouse), the City of Salem, the Commonwealth of Massachusetts, and the MBTA. Planners initially considered a garage of up to 750 spaces; after various changes, the five-story garage was built with 714 spaces.

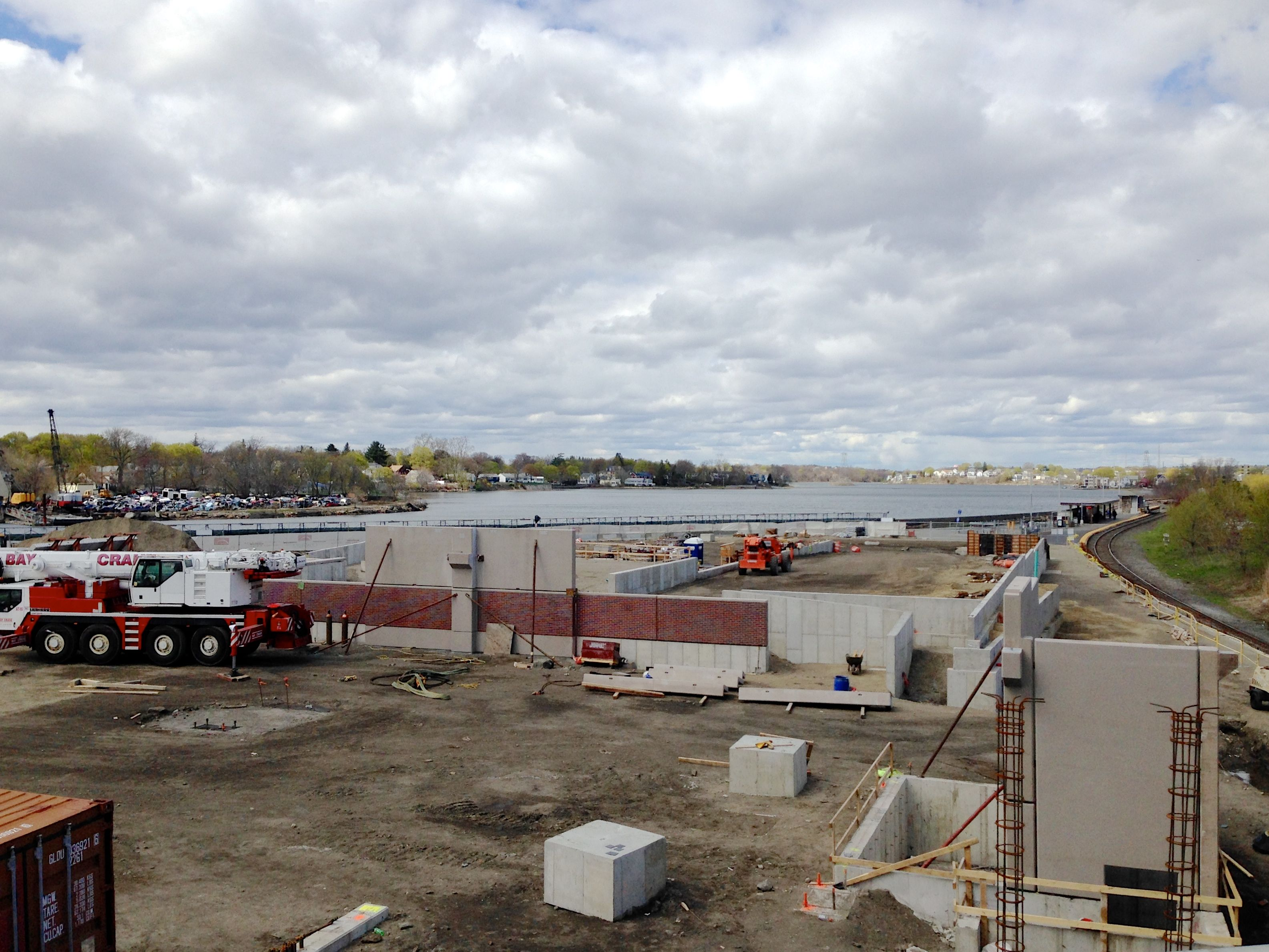
Foundation work in May 2014

Major planning was completed in 2012, with community input leading to the addition of brick facades to match local architecture, as well as an indoor waiting room. On August 24, 2012, the Massachusetts Executive Office of Environmental Affairs granted the MBTA an exemption to the mandatory Environmental Impact Assessment, as the project was to be built entirely over an existing parking lot and was thus unlikely to have negative environmental effects. Besides the garage, the project included the construction of a standard 800-foot (240 m)-long high-level platform for faster and fully accessible level boarding, as well as rehabilitation of the 1900-built interlocking tower. The project was originally to cost $37 million, but increased to $44.5 million due to changes mandated by new earthquake codes, the brick facades, and a roof for the pedestrian walkway.

In early 2012, engineers found the remains of the roundhouse using ground penetrating radar while examining the site in preparation for the new parking garage. In November 2012, the MBTA closed part of the existing parking lot to excavate the remains, as required by the state Historical Commission. The Historical Commission unearthed the roundhouse foundation in early December 2012. A $32.5 million construction contract was awarded on December 8, 2012. The parking lot closed on July 20, 2013 for construction; a free lot opened later at the nearby former Universal Steel. A groundbreaking ceremony was held on September 13, 2013.

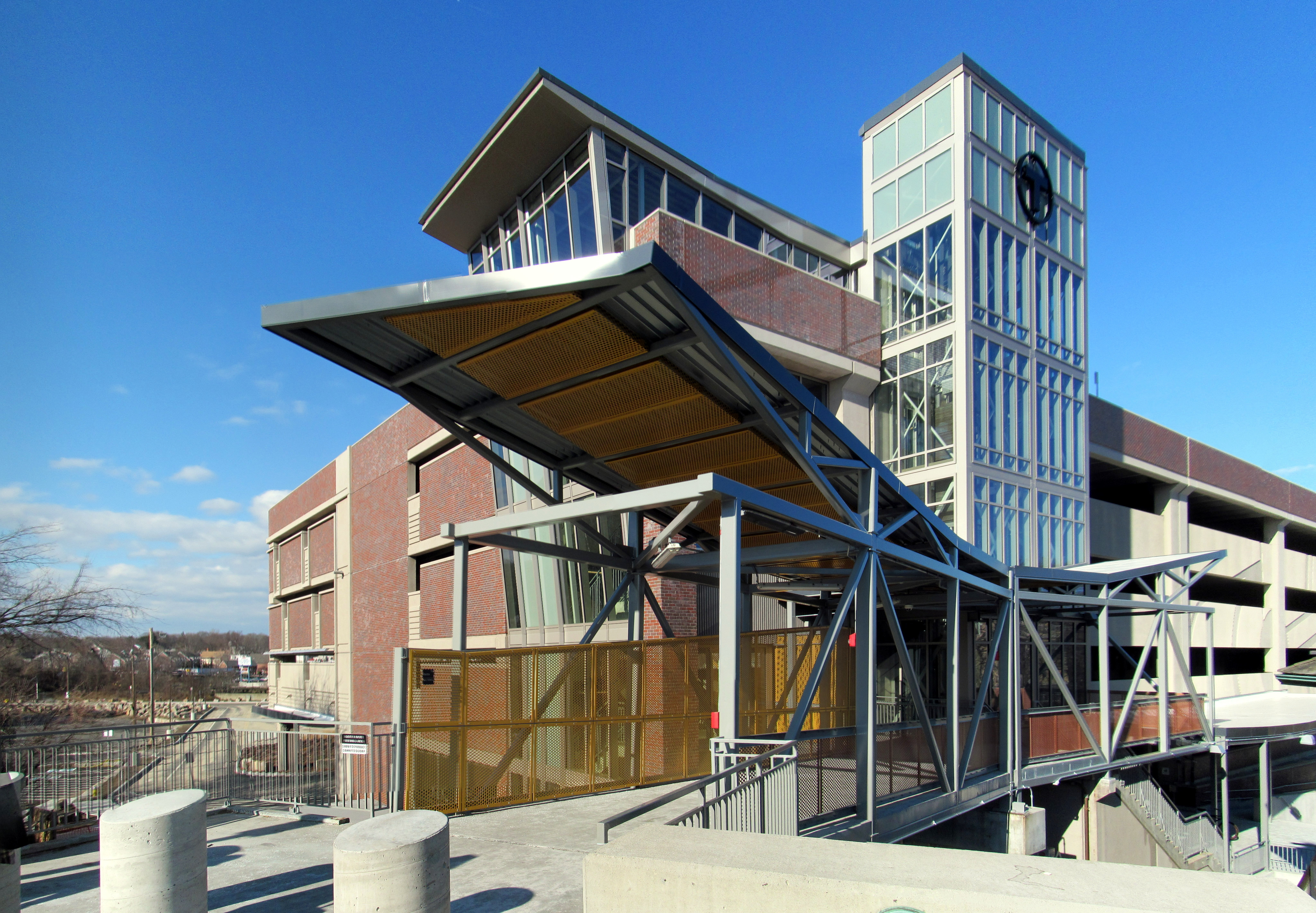
The footbridge to the finished garage in 2016

After several months of foundation work, construction of the garage itself began in May 2014. The garage and the first section of the high-level platform opened on October 24, 2014. A ribbon-cutting ceremony was held on November 17, 2014. Remaining work on the project - including the north half of the platform, the bus loop, passenger drop-off areas, traffic lights, and bike paths - lasted into the first half of 2015. In January 2015, a "Pedal and Park" secure bike cage with racks for at least 100 bikes opened. This was the first such installation at an MBTA station without rapid transit service.

By September 2015, the Salem garage was averaging 413 cars on weekdays. The Bridge Street lot reopened on October 16, 2015. The high-level platform was replaced in segments in May and June 2016, as some parts been built with a higher cross slope than the ADA allows. The rework was done at the contractor's expense, as the MBTA's plans specified the correct lower slope. The waiting room had a tendency to flood during severe rains, a problem which the MBTA and the contractor began fixing in 2016 by adding a glass panel and new caulking.

According to a 2018 ridership count, Salem is the busiest commuter rail station in the MBTA system outside of the central Boston stations, with an average of 2,326 daily boardings. Although parking demand at Salem is high, approximately half of riders walk or bike to the station from nearby neighborhoods. Before the garage project, access via the footbridge at Washington Street was inconvenient for many of these passengers, particularly those coming from areas northwest of the station via North Street and southwest via Bridge Street. Reaching the station from these areas or an off-street lot along Bridge Street often involved crossing at an unsignalised crosswalk with poor visibility around a curve. Unofficial trails paralleling the two streets from the parking lot entrance were used by many pedestrians, but these routes were not accessible and involved trespassing on private land and/or the lightly used freight tracks. Following a 2013 city study that recommended constructing sidewalks and gated track crossings along these desire lines to enhance pedestrian access, accessible track crossings were installed on both sides on North Street to allow pedestrians to avoid the bridge. However, an official pedestrian route following the unofficial path north of the platform to the nearby Jefferson at Salem Station development was ruled out in March 2013 due to safety concerns, as it would have crossed the much busier mainline track.

Salem is ordinarily a major tourist destination during the weeks preceding Halloween; the MBTA operates additional weekend service to Salem during October to accommodate demand. In 2020, to discourage crowding during the COVID-19 pandemic, this extra service was not run; most outbound trains did not stop at Salem for two weekends in late October. The additional service was resumed in October 2021. Service on the inner portion of the Newburyport/Rockport Line was suspended for several periods in March–September 2022 to accommodate signal work on the line.

==== Future ====
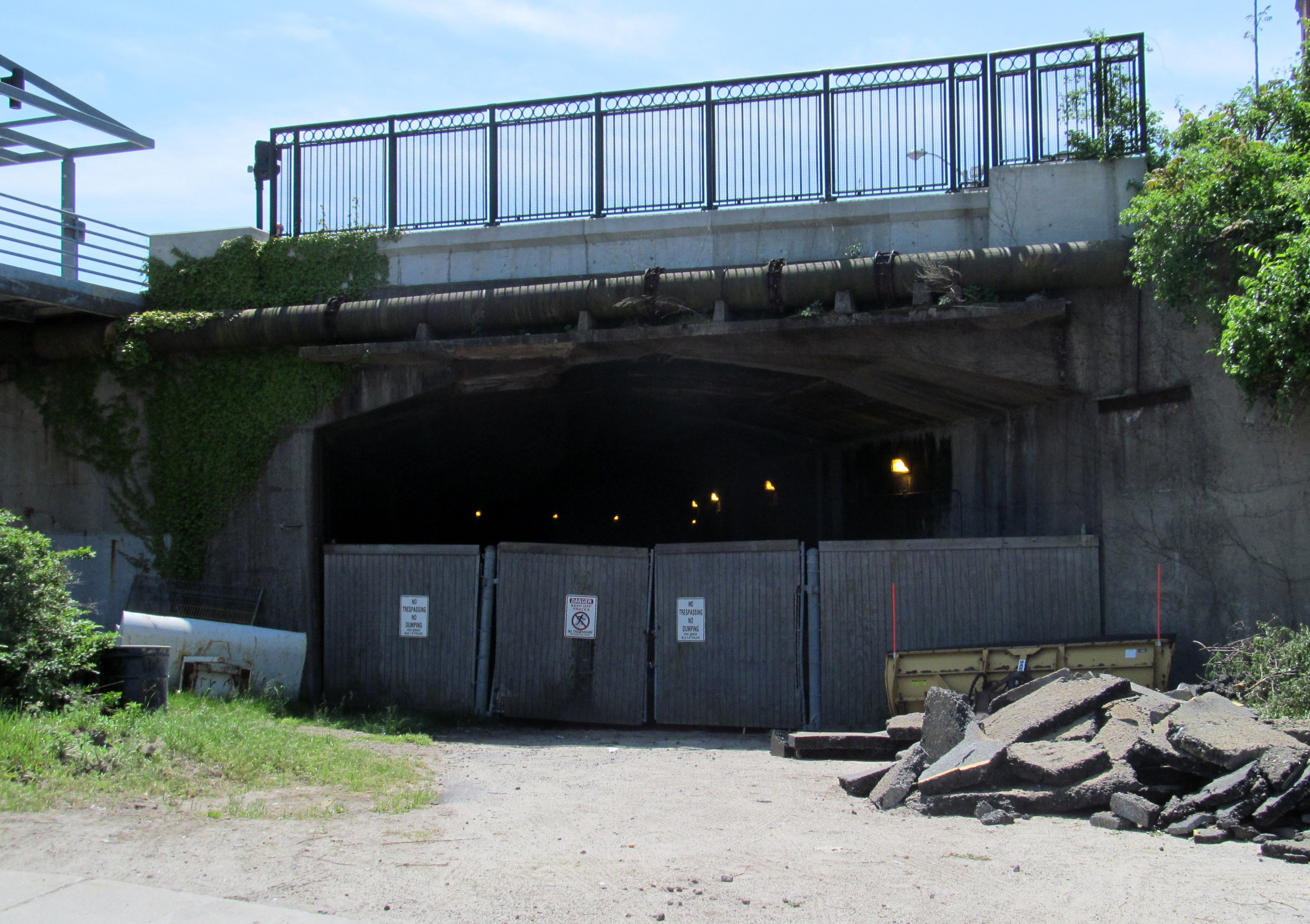
The unused tunnel portal in 2012

The MBTA has contemplated adding a branch line from Salem through Peabody, terminating near the Northshore Mall or the Danversport area of Danvers. While the right of way to Peabody would be shared with existing freight service, the routes beyond that involve restoring tracks on the Salem and Lawrence Railroad or the Essex Railroad, both of which have been unused for decades. In 2004, the MBTA classified the branch line as a "Medium Term" proposal with an 11-to-20-year time frame for implementation. In comparison, the new parking garage and rehabilitation of the current station were classed "Short Term" and were completed in 2014.

The former branch portal created by the 1951-built overpass is still intact. An easement for the connection to the Danvers Branch was maintained in early designs for the garage, but may have been obstructed by the garage as built. A 2018 study of rail service to Peabody called for a Salem–Peabody shuttle service, requiring passengers to transfer at Salem for service to Boston. As of 2024, a residential transit oriented development is planned to replace the remaining surface parking lot bordering Bridge Street.
