= South Reading Branch Railroad =

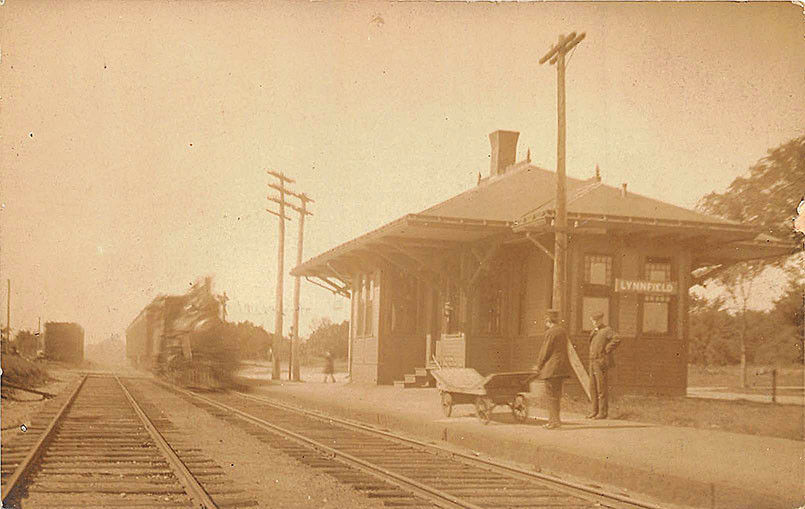
- Lynnfield station on the South Reading Branch

Overview
- Other name(s): Wakefield Branch
- Status: Defunct
- Locale: Massachusetts
- Termini: Peabody; Wakefield

Service
- Type: Heavy rail
- Operator(s): South Reading Branch Railroad (1850-1851); Eastern Railroad (1851-1884); Boston and Maine Railroad (1884-1964) (Note: Last passenger train in 1959.); Boston and Maine Corporation (1964-1983) (Note: Freight service only.); Pan Am Railways (1983-2023)

History
- Opened: 1850
- Closed: 1925 (Peabody to Wakefield); 1959 (Lynnfield to Boston)

Technical
- Line length: 8 mi (13 km)
- Track gauge: 1,435 mm (4 ft 8 1/2 in) standard gauge

The South Reading Branch Railroad or just South Reading Railroad (later Wakefield Branch) was a short line railroad that ran from Wakefield, Massachusetts to Peabody, Massachusetts. Its origins began sometime in 1850 when the railroad was named after the town of South Reading before its name change to Wakefield in 1868. By the time Boston and Maine took over the railroad in 1884, the line had already become obsolete due to competing branches. Boston and Maine eventually halted passenger service in 1925 by abandoning 8 miles of track between Peabody and Lynnfield. The tracks of the former Wakefield branch continued to operate from Lynnfield to Boston until 1959 when passenger service ended. The remaining tracks were then used for freight service from Salem through Peabody Square to South Peabody to serve industrial parks until October 2023.

== History ==
Map

In 1848, a group of investors from Salem and Danvers were granted a charter to build a railroad line from South Reading to South Danvers. The line took two years to build and opened for business in 1850 and opened up another Boston to Salem route as it was given trackage rights to Salem on the Essex Railroad.

The Boston to Salem route had long been monopolized by the Eastern Railroad and when the South Reading line was opened, it took quite a bit of the business away with lower fares and the fact that passengers had a direct link to downtown Boston via the Boston and Maine Railroad, the Eastern's most heated rival. Whereas the Eastern had to ferry their passengers from East Boston across the harbor to get to and from Boston, many passengers preferred to take the B&M to Wakefield and go to Salem via the South Reading.

In 1851, the Eastern Railroad, fearing that the B&M would take over the South Reading, in self-defense took over the line at steep cost. The Massachusetts State Legislature for years forced the Eastern to keep the Boston-to-Salem route open via the South Reading even after the Eastern had leased the Grand Junction Railroad in order to provide service directly into downtown Boston.

In 1868, South Reading became Wakefield and South Danvers changed to Peabody. The line was then renamed the Wakefield Branch.

When the B&M took over the Eastern RR in December 1884, the South Reading line became obsolete as the B&M had other lines that went to Salem via the Newburyport Branch and the former Boston and Lowell Railroad branch line, the Salem and Lowell Railroad.

In 1925, the B&M received permission to abandon the line and the tracks were removed from Wakefield Center (where the line split from the Newburyport Branch) to Peabody.

== Current status ==
In the 1950s, part of the abandoned right-of-way became part of Massachusetts Route 128/Interstate 95 in the Montrose section of Wakefield. In 1965, the first two miles of the line were rebuilt between Peabody and South Peabody to service a new industrial park. Freight service was recently suspended due to closing of factory in Peabody, which was the branch's only customer. CSX Transportation has freight rights on this line. Portions of the right-of-way in Lynnfield and Wakefield are still traceable.

== Gallery ==
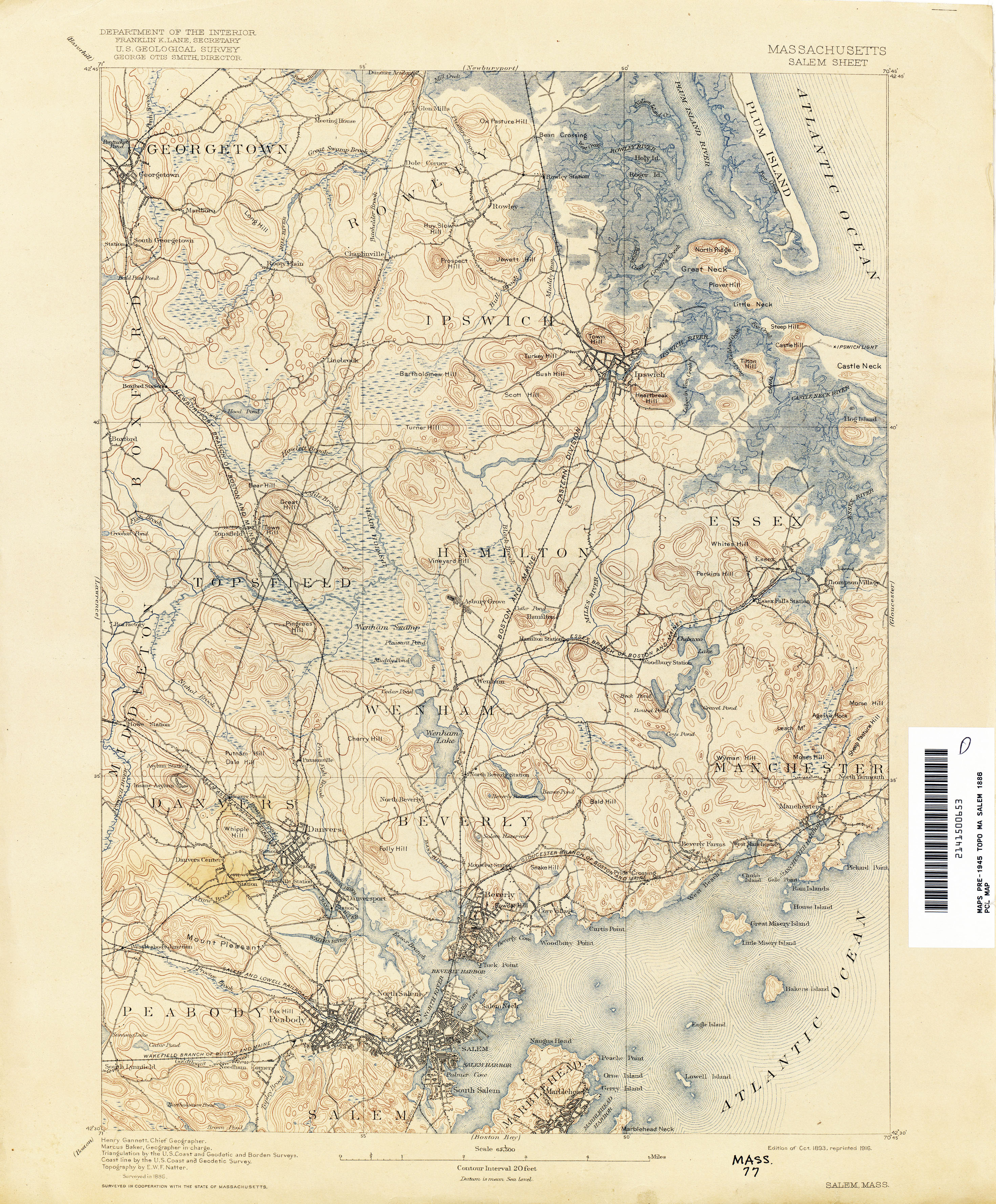
"Wakefield Branch of Boston and Maine" in 1886 (bottom left of map),

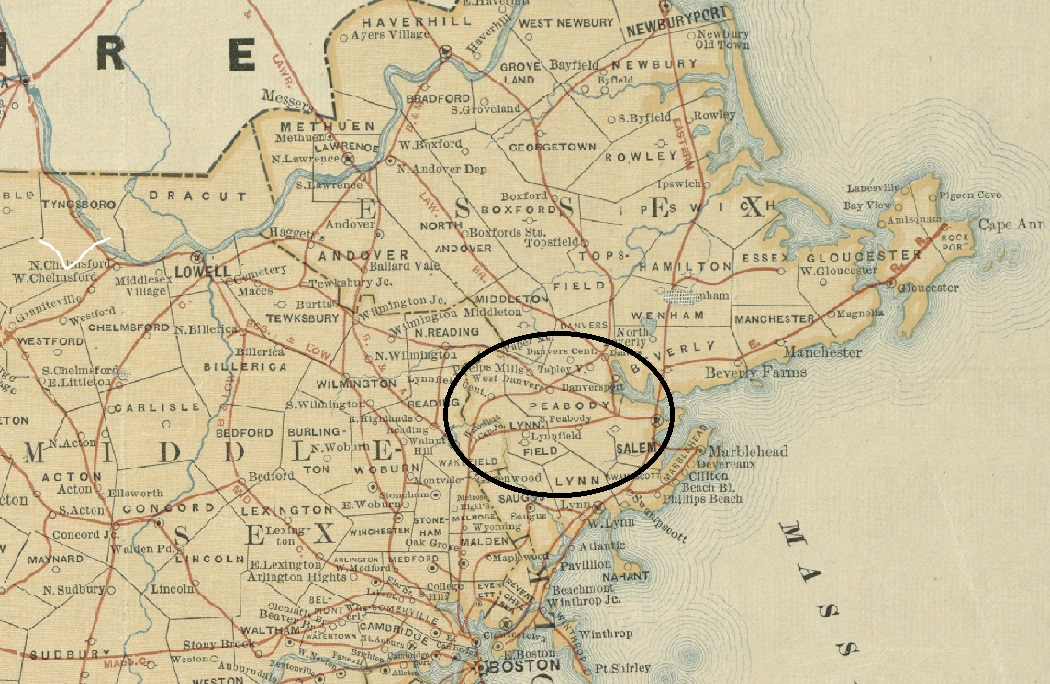
Wakefield Branch in 1887 (circled),

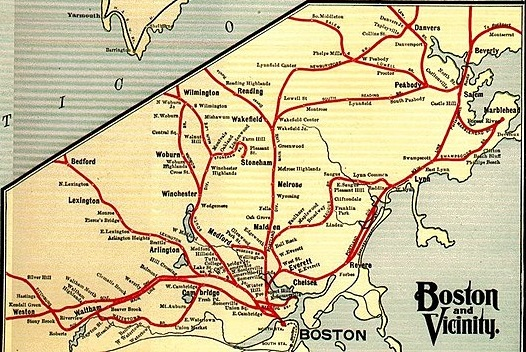
Boston and Maine Railroad map from 1916, the "Wakefield Branch" is under the word "PEABODY".

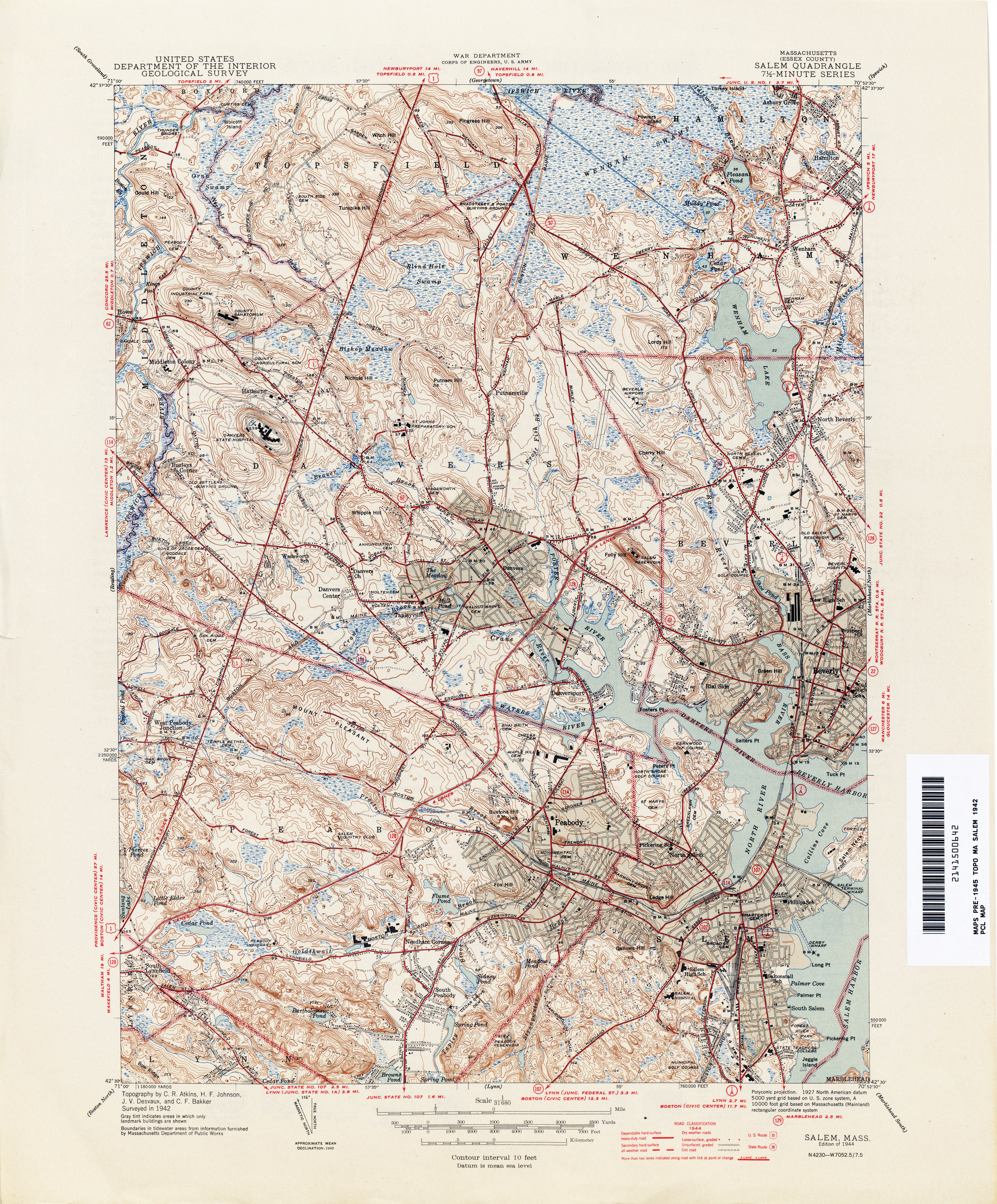
Topographic map from 1942 showing the remains of the Wakefield Branch, the Salem layover is visible next to "Bridge Street".

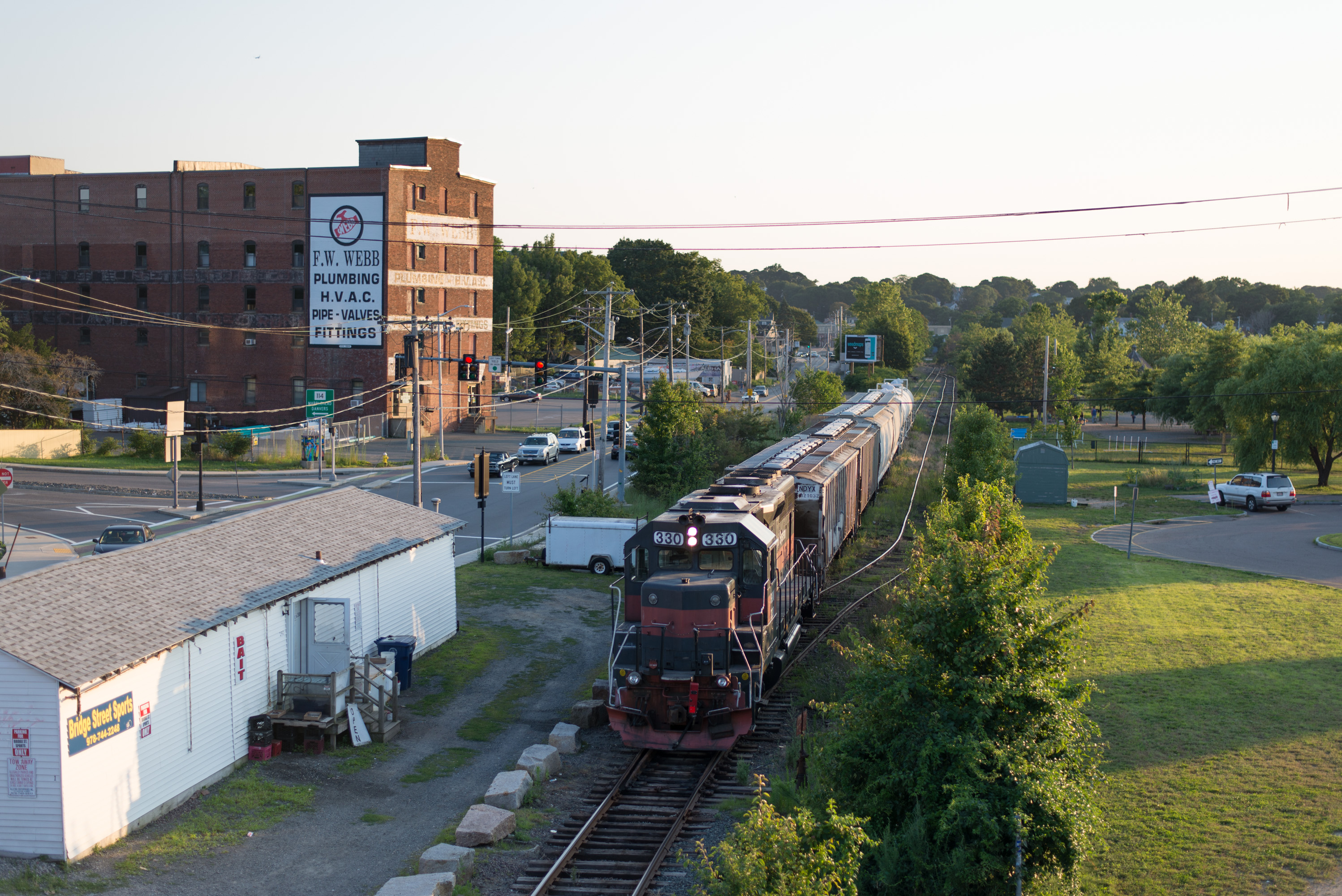
2017 picture of a Pan AM freight train in the remains of the Salem layover.

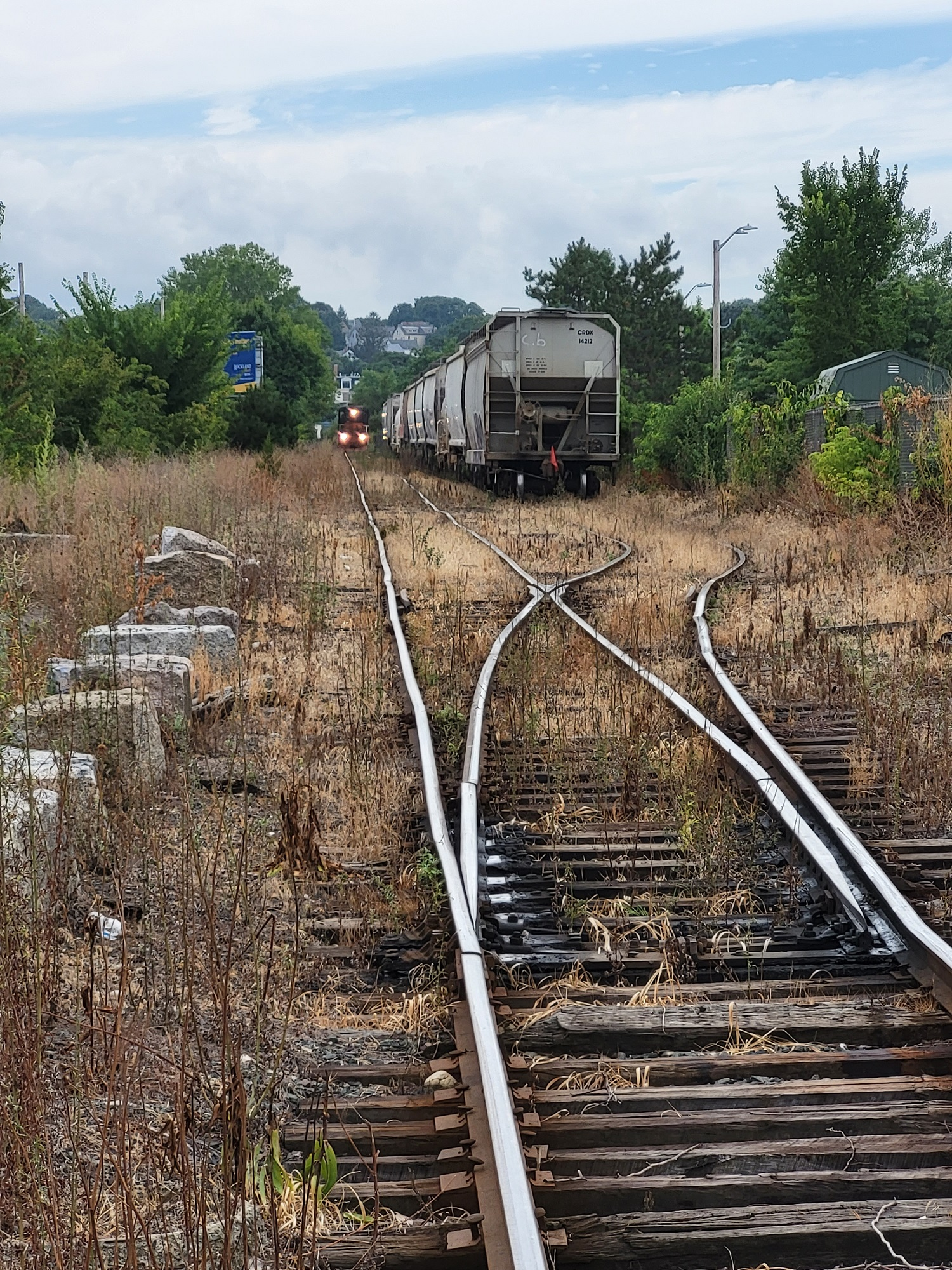
2022 picture of the former layover, the track on the right was used to switch directions.

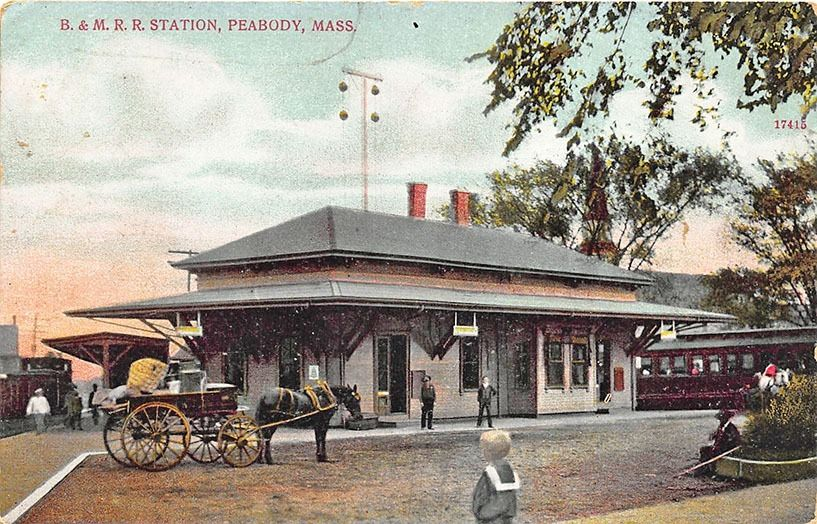
Peabody station in 1908.

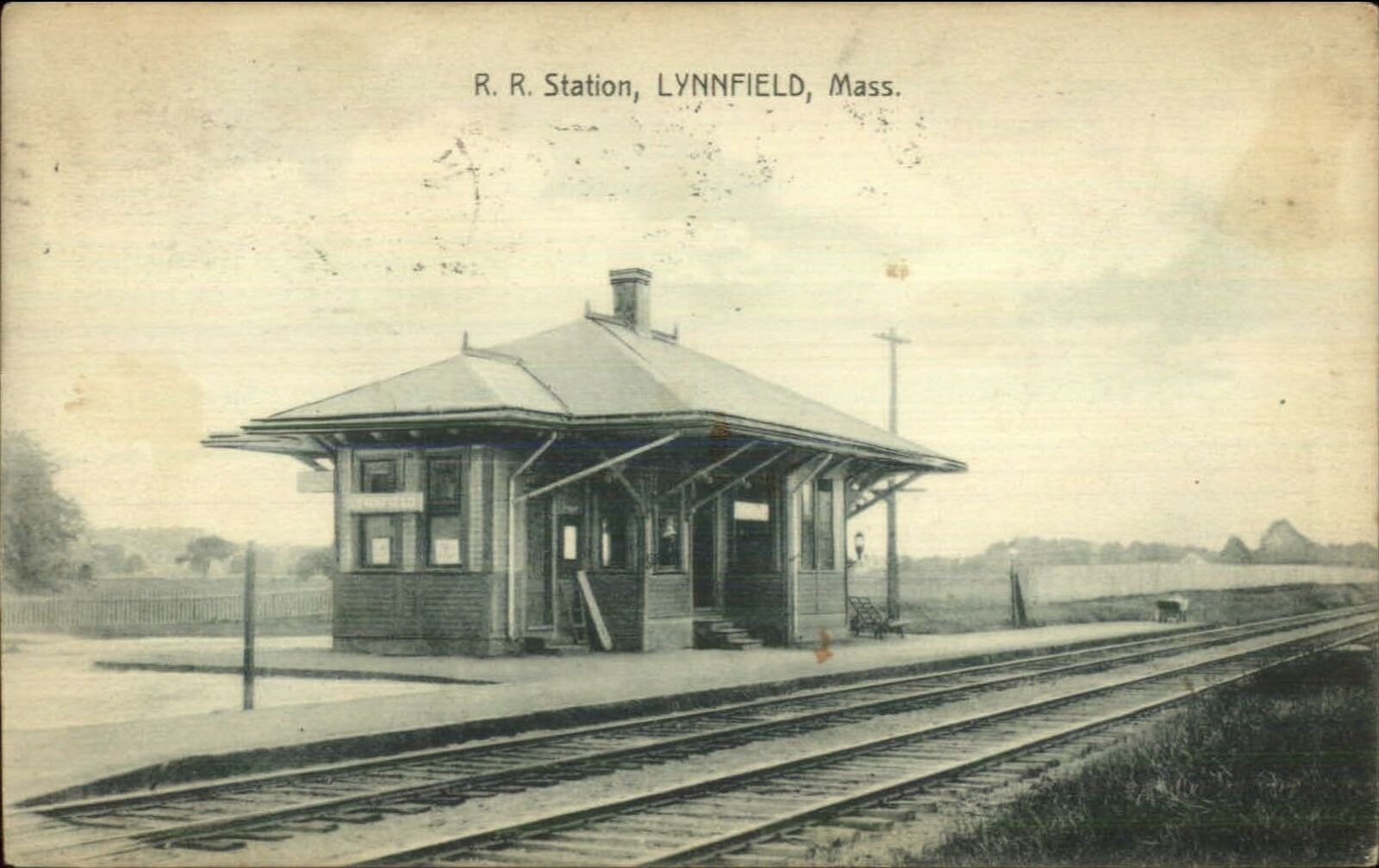
Lynnfield station in 1911.

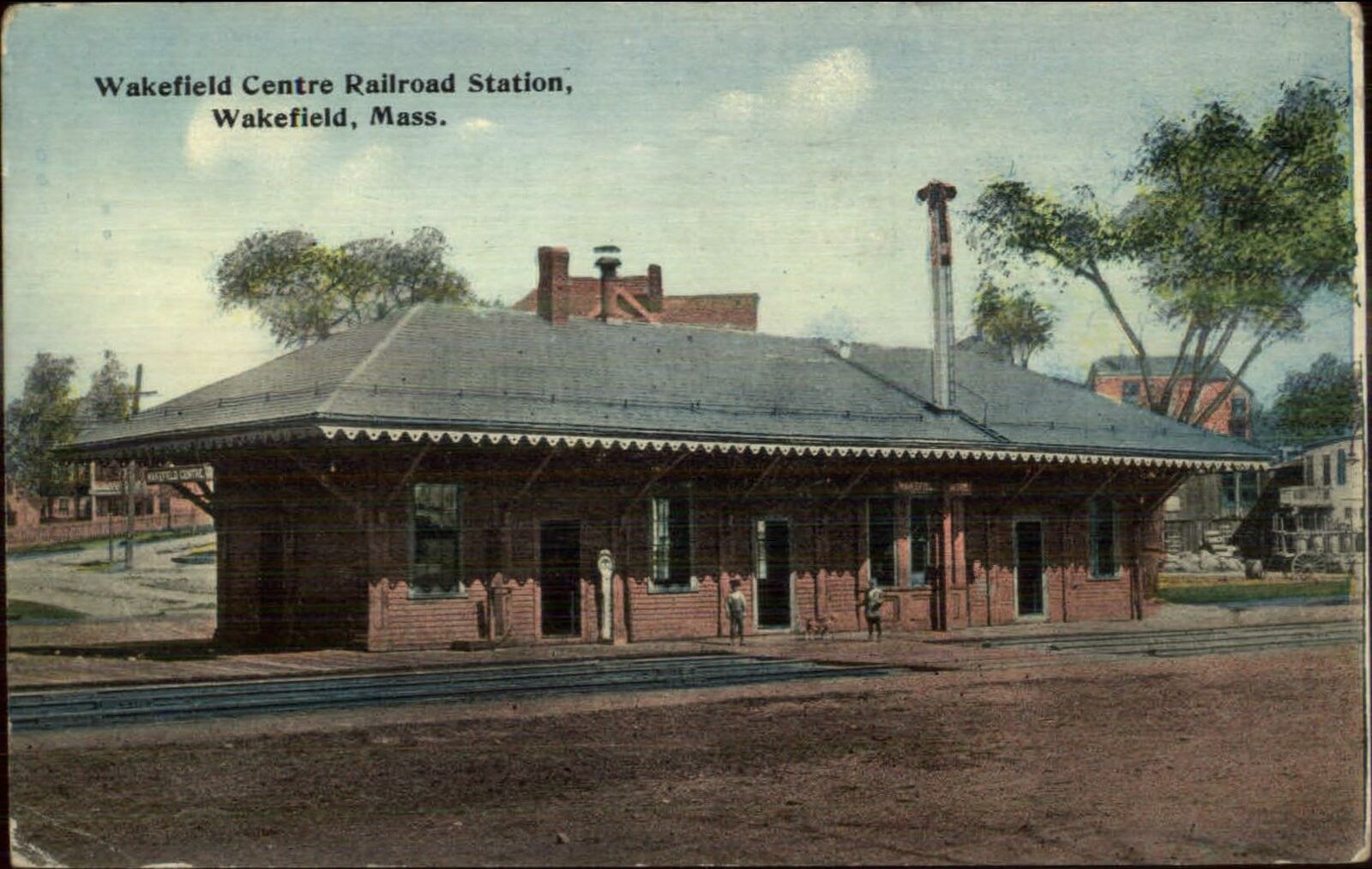
Wakefield Centre station in 1913.

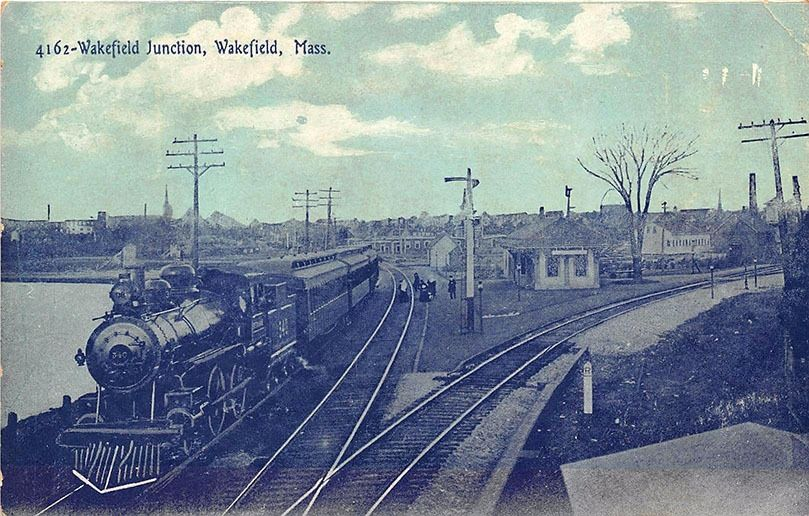
Wakefield Junction station in 1913, the Wakefield branch to Peabody is the track on the right.

== See also ==
- Bay State Street Railway
- Eastern Massachusetts Street Railway
- Newburyport Railroad
- Salem and Lowell Railroad
- Saugus Branch Railroad
