= Essex Railroad =

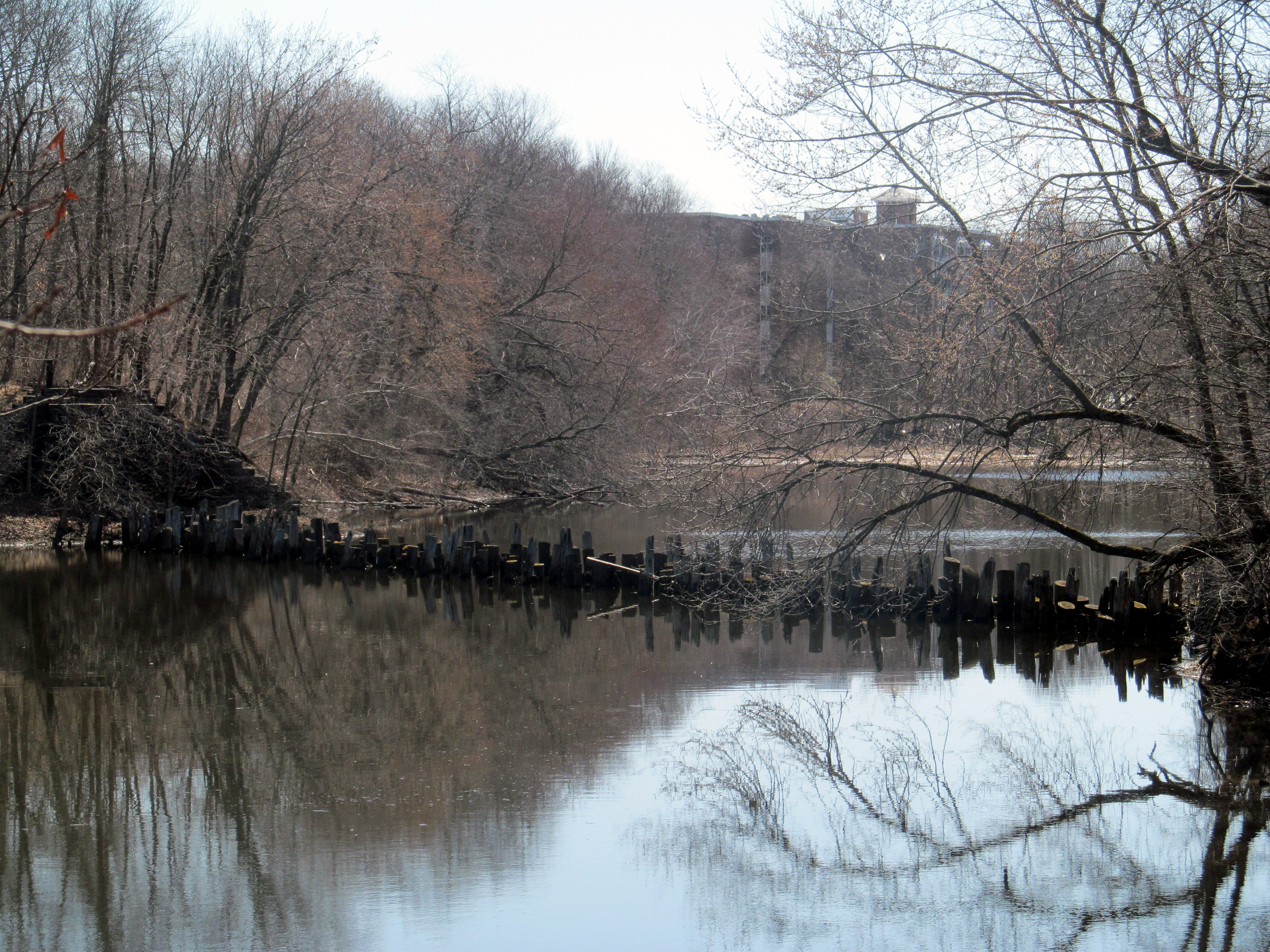
- Remains of the former Essex Railroad bridge across Sutton Pond in North Andover (2015)

Overview
- Other name(s): Lawrence Branch
- Status: Defunct
- Locale: Massachusetts
- Termini: Salem; North Andover

Service
- Type: Heavy rail
- Operator(s): Eastern Railroad (1847-1884); Boston and Maine Railroad (1884-1958)

History
- Opened: 1847
- Closed: 1927 (Salem to Lawrence); 1958 (Salem to Danvers Junction)

Technical
- Track gauge: 1,435 mm (4 ft 8 1/2 in) standard gauge

The Essex Railroad (later known as the Lawrence Branch of the Eastern Railroad) was an American railroad in Essex County, Massachusetts that connected Salem to Lawrence.

== History ==
Map

In the mid-19th century, Mayor Stephen C. Phillips was an "outspoken promoter" for railroad development in Salem. Phillips was anxious to make his city the port of entry for both Lawrence, and Lowell which caused him to lobby furiously for the cause. The "Essex Railroad Company" was chartered by an act of Legislature passed on March 7, 1846. Two days later, the City of Salem formally granted the "Essex Railroad Company" an act of incorporation (with backing from the Eastern Railroad). This granted the construction of a railroad from Salem through to South and North Danvers, Middleton, and North Andover. It would also connect a proposed new city in Methuen which later became Lawrence. Civil engineer Charles S. Storrow approached and counseled Phillips on the subject in April 1847. Storrow reassured him that a railroad to Lawrence would "recapture what Salem had lost".

By the beginning of 1847, the first 2 miles (3.2 km) of track were completed from Salem to Peabody (then called South Danvers). The route was operated by the Eastern while the track to North Andover was constructed. In 1850, two new lines, the South Reading Branch Railroad and the Salem and Lowell Railroad, rented this stretch to give the Essex badly needed revenue.

By September 1848, the Essex was completed to the Boston and Maine Railroad's main line in North Andover, and it was given trackage rights to Lawrence and South Lawrence over the B&M.

From the beginning, the Essex operation was under-capitalized, and it was soon in financial trouble. Operations were suspended three times. The first shut down was in April 1849, and the line remained closed for a year. The line reopened in the spring of 1850, but financial problems halted operations again by the fall. In October 1851, the Essex entered into a lease agreement with the Eastern, and the line was reopened and run as the Eastern's Lawrence Branch.

When the Eastern was absorbed by the B&M in 1884, Essex County was a dense network of rail lines through sparsely populated areas. The B&M could not justify keeping all these branch lines open. Freight service on the Essex had all but disappeared by 1925, and passenger service had lost riders to the trolley lines running through Danvers and Middleton. The only services on the line that were still strong were the passenger service for Lawrence factory workers commuting to North Andover and the freight service between Salem and Danvers Junction, where the Essex met the Newburyport Branch.

In 1927, the B&M abandoned the line between Stevens Station in North Andover and Danvers Junction. The line continued to operate until Stevens Mills closed in the 1960s and freight service to the North Andover Machine Shop ended in 1981. The line was formally abandoned later that year. Commuter service between Danvers Junction and Salem picked up and remained strong until 1958, when passenger service stopped. In 1985, the Waters River Bridge caught fire and took the line out of service. Customers north of the bridge were serviced via the Newburyport branch until all service on that line was suspended around 2000. The line between Peabody Square and Salem remained open for freight and the MBTA had preliminary plans to reopen passenger service between Salem and Danvers Junction, replacing the old bridge to gain access to Danvers. A connecting segment at Route 1 is planned to open in 2024.
