= Newburyport Railroad =

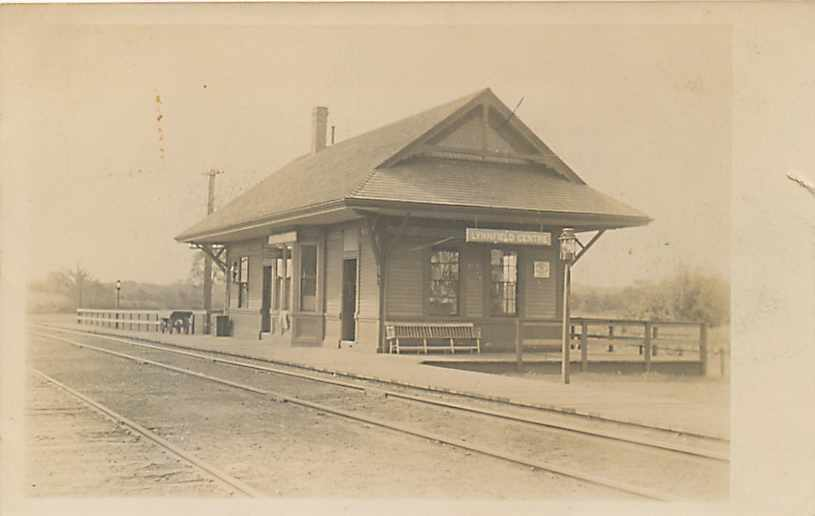
- Lynnfield Center station on the Newburyport Railroad

Overview
- Status: Defunct
- Locale: Massachusetts
- Termini: Newburyport, Massachusetts; Wakefield, Massachusetts

Service
- Operator(s): Newburyport and Bradford Railroad (1849-1855) Danvers and Georgetown Railroad (1853-1855); Newburyport Railroad (1855-1860); Boston and Maine Railroad (1855-1982) Guilford Rail System (1983-2001)

Technical
- Line length: 29.97 mi (48.23 km)
- Track gauge: 1,435 mm (4 ft 8 1/2 in) standard gauge

The Newburyport Railroad (later known as the Newburyport Branch of the Boston and Maine Railroad) was a railroad that came about from the merger of three small rail companies into one rail line to compete with the Eastern Railroad for service between Newburyport and Boston, Massachusetts. The Newburyport Railroad ran from Newburyport to Wakefield, Massachusetts, where it connected with the Boston and Maine (B&M) for service into Boston.

== History ==
Map

The first company that would later become part of the Newburyport Railroad was the Newburyport and Bradford Railroad, incorporated on March 11, 1846. It opened a line from Newburyport on the Eastern to Georgetown in 1849 and extended it west to the B&M at Bradford (now part of Haverhill) in 1851.

The second company, the Danvers and Georgetown Railroad, was organized on May 7, 1851 and began work in April 1853 on a line running from the Newburyport Railroad at Georgetown south to Danvers on the Essex Railroad.

The third company, the Danvers Railroad, was incorporated on March 15, 1852, and began construction in August 1853 on a line from Danvers southwest to the South Reading Branch Railroad and the B&M in Wakefield.

On October 23, 1854, the entire line from Newburyport to Wakefield was complete. On February 22, 1855, the first two companies merged to form the Newburyport Railroad, which operated the section from Newburyport to Danvers. The B&M operated the section from Danvers to Wakefield, and in 1860, it leased the Newburyport Railroad, taking over operations on the entire line and running it as its Newburyport Branch. On October 30, 1906, the B&M bought the line outright.

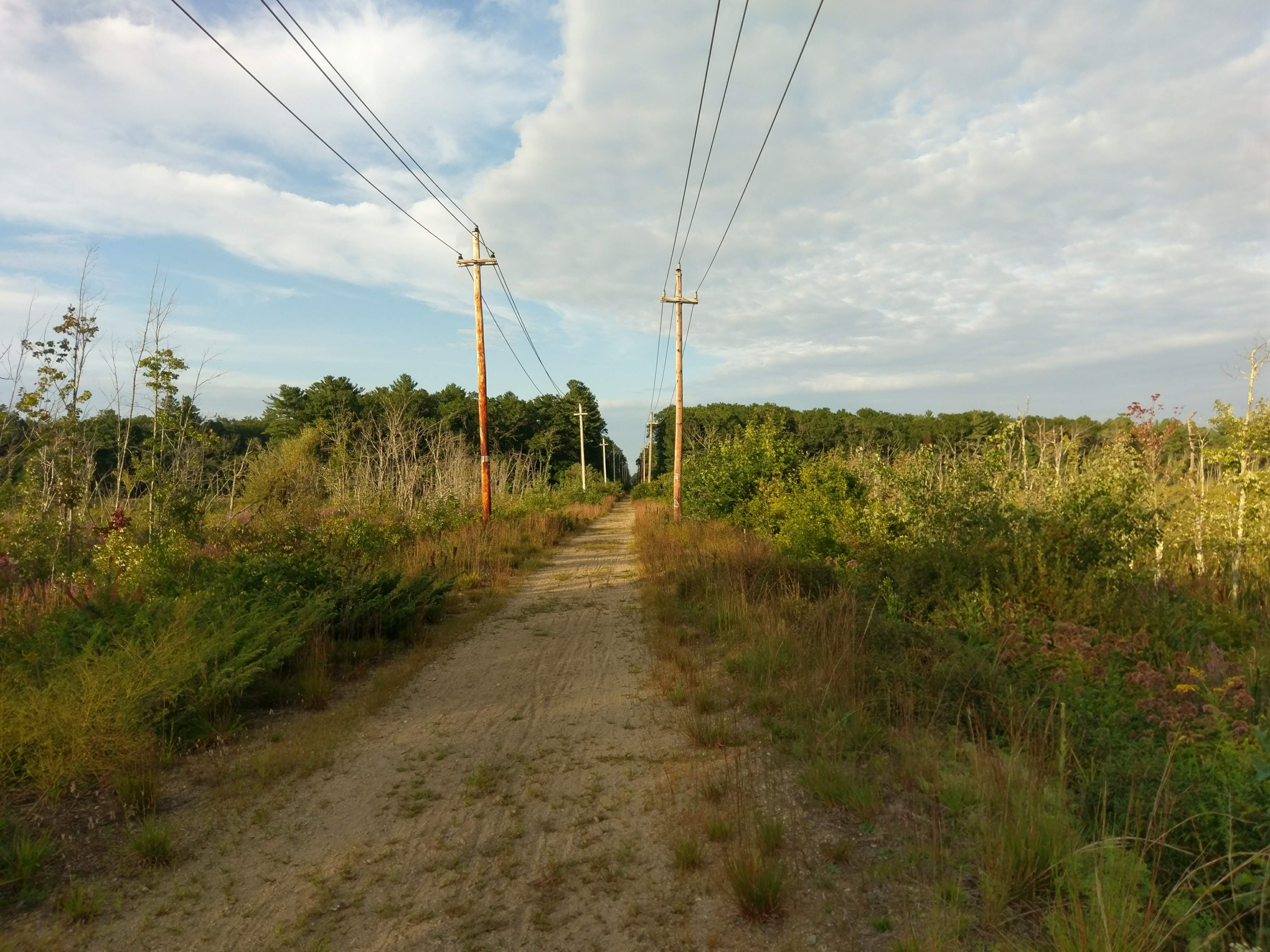
The former right-of-way in Georgetown in 2018

After World War I, the Newburyport Branch experienced a decline in ridership, and in 1924, the B&M tried to end service, but passenger and industry protest kept it open. Reduced service, with some stations closed, began in 1925. In 1940, the B&M successfully applied to close the line between Newburyport and Topsfield, and service ended there in December 1941. The following year it abandoned the line between Georgetown and the paper mill in Bradford, servicing the paper mill from the B&M main line instead. In 1950, passenger travel ceased between Topsfield and Danvers, and in 1959, all passenger travel on the line came to an end.

In 1976, the B&M sold the section from Wakefield Junction to Topsfield to the Massachusetts Bay Transportation Authority. In 1981, the section between Topsfield and Danvers was abandoned. Freight service continued on the section between Wakefield and Danvers until about 2001. The line served freight customers on the former Essex Railroad until a fire destroyed the Waters River Bridge, preventing freight traffic from continuing to Salem.

The portion of the abandoned right-of-way from Peabody to Newburyport is being converted to rail trails, which are part of the Border to Boston Trail. $122,000 in state funds for design of the Boxford section was awarded in 2022. A 4.4-mile (7.1 km) Wakefield-Lynnfield Rail Trail is also planned.
