= Salem and Lowell Railroad =

Railroad in Massachusetts

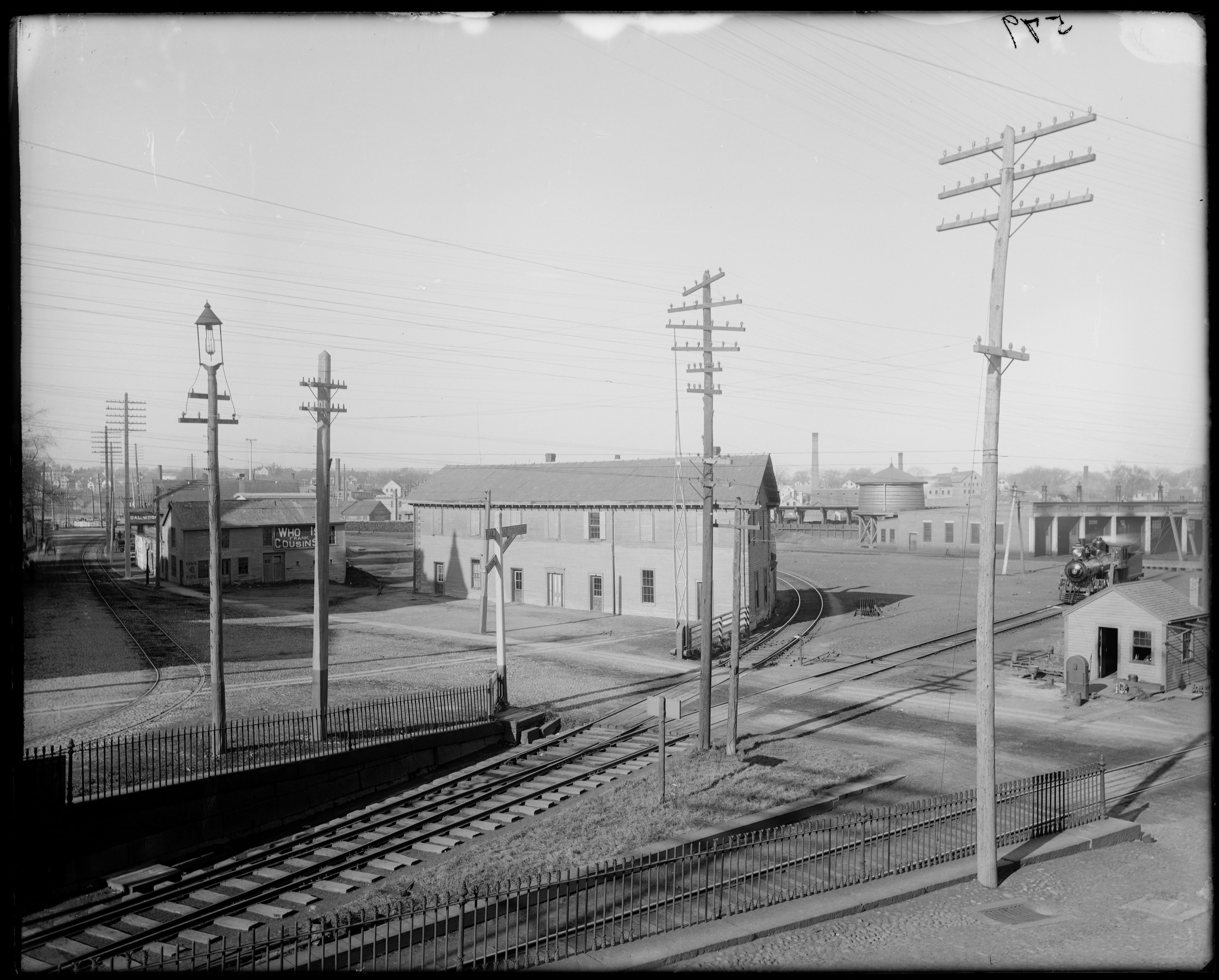
- The Salem and Lowell Railroad's station in Salem, Massachusetts, in the late 19th century. This station was demolished in 1912.

Overview
- Dates of operation: 1850–1879
- Successor: Boston and Lowell Railroad

Technical
- Track gauge: 4 ft 8 1/2 in (1,435 mm) standard gauge
- Length: 18 miles (29 km) (including Salem Harbor Branch, not including trackage rights)

The Salem and Lowell Railroad, chartered in 1848, was a railroad in Massachusetts that connected the towns of Peabody (near Salem) and Tewksbury (near Lowell). The company connected to other railroads at both ends to provide service to its two namesake cities - the Lowell and Lawrence Railroad at Tewksbury Junction, and the Essex Railroad at Peabody. Construction was completed in 1850, with train operations contracted to the Lowell and Lawrence until 1858, when the Boston and Lowell Railroad took over both companies. In 1887, the Boston and Maine Railroad took over the Boston and Lowell and became the new operator of the Salem and Lowell. The line gradually declined in importance from the start of the 20th century, and was progressively abandoned from 1925 onwards. The last trains ran on the route in 1980, and the remainder of the route formally abandoned in 1987. Parts of the right of way are now a rail-trail.

== Founding and construction ==
The Salem and Lowell Railroad was chartered in 1848 to connect its namesake cities. However, the route did not directly reach either Salem or Lowell, instead connecting to other railroads at each end of the line near the two cities. In Peabody, the Salem and Lowell connected with the Essex Railroad which had an existing line on the final two miles (3.2 km) to Salem; in Tewksbury, the Salem and Lowell met the Lowell and Lawrence Railroad, itself under construction at the time, for the remaining six miles (9.7 km) to Lowell. The company was formally incorporated on May 30, 1849, in Lawrence. Construction began in 1849, with grading of the route completed by May 1850. Following the installation of the tracks, the railroad ran its inaugural trains on August 1, 1850. Besides its main line, the Salem and Lowell also built a two mile (3.2 km) long branch to Salem Harbor. The Salem Harbor Branch was connected to the rest of the Salem and Lowell system by trackage rights over the Essex Railroad.

== Operating history ==
Upon opening, the Salem and Lowell awarded the Lowell and Lawrence a contract to operate its line; the Salem and Lowell Railroad never operated its own trains. Even before opening, plans began for the railroad to transport significant amounts of grain and flour from Salem, which were highly in demand in Lowell. The line passed to the Boston and Lowell Railroad (B&L) in 1858, which had decided to lease both it and the Lowell and Lawrence as part of its strategy to compete with the Boston and Maine Railroad (B&M). Under the B&L, Salem became a significant port for the import of coal, much of which travelled over the Salem and Lowell to reach interior parts of New England. In 1871, the B&L paid $468,000 to purchase a majority of the Salem and Lowell's shares and take direct control of the company. The Salem and Lowell Railroad agreed to sell its assets to the Boston and Lowell on April 16, 1879, ending its existence as a separate company.

The railroad was the site of a derailment on November 10, 1883, when a passenger train bound for Salem struck a cow on the tracks and derailed. The first reports of the accident claimed that "the entire train went off the track" and "the engineer was probably fatally injured." However, the Boston Evening Transcript reported that in reality only the locomotive derailed, with the engineer slightly hurt and no passengers harmed, and that "The first reports of the accident were greatly exaggerated."

The B&L's long time rival B&M leased its competitor in 1887, inheriting the Salem and Lowell as well. The route gained a significant new customer in Peabody, the Essex Trap Rock and Construction Company, which began construction in 1905 and connected to the line with several spur tracks. On the rest of the line, traffic generally declined from the start of the 20th century. The first part of the line to be discontinued was the 4-mile (6.4 km) segment between Tewksbury Junction and Wilmington Junction, which duplicated other B&M lines. This segment, which generated almost zero traffic for the Boston and Maine, saw its last trains in August 1924, followed by formal abandonment in late 1925. Passenger train service was cancelled on the entire line in September 1932, and freight service was cut back further to North Reading in May 1935. This portion of the line saw very little traffic and was abandoned in 1939 beyond a point half a mile (0.8 km) west of South Middleton where the furthest remaining rail served customers were located. In 1962, the eastern end of the line from Peabody to West Peabody was also abandoned, leaving only the spur to South Middleton and the Salem Harbor Branch. The latter was abandoned as well around 1970. The remaining tracks to South Middleton served some customers, and connected to another B&M line in South Peabody. This remnant of the Salem and Lowell saw its final train service in 1980, and with its abandonment in 1987 no active portions of the line remained.

== Post-railroad use ==
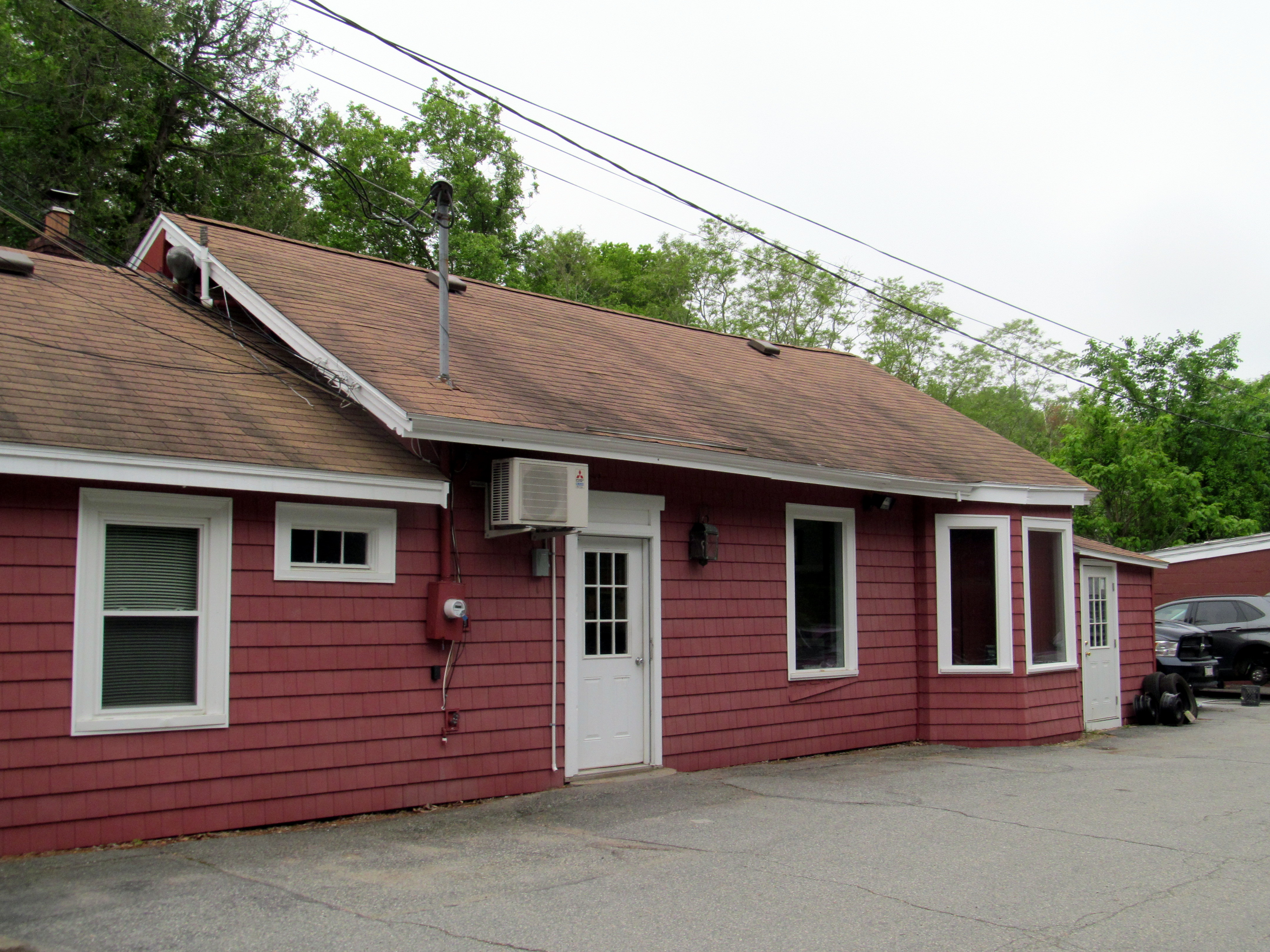
The Salem and Lowell freight station in North Reading survives today

The section in Lynnfield and Peabody was later converted to the Independence Greenway. In July 2020, the state awarded $45,000 for a feasibility study of a trail on the right-of-way in North Reading along with the design of a bridge over Route 1 in Peabody. $500,000 for design of an extension of the Peabody segment was awarded in 2022.
