= Middlesex Fells Reservation Parkways =

Parkways in Greater Boston, Massachusetts

- U.S. National Register of Historic Places
- U.S. Historic district
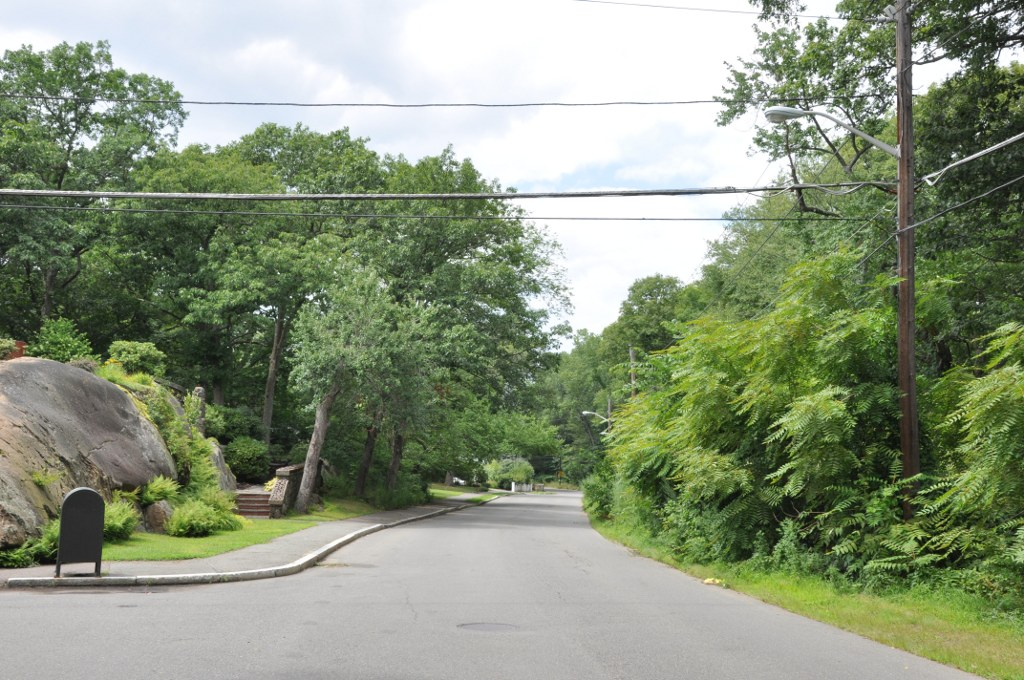
- East Border Road in Malden

- Location within Massachusetts Location within the United States
- Location: Malden, Medford, Melrose, Stoneham, and Winchester in Massachusetts
- Coordinates: 42°26′43″N 71°6′10″W
- Built: 1896
- Architect: Eliot, Charles; Olmsted Brothers
- MPS: Metropolitan Park System of Greater Boston MPS
- NRHP reference No.: 02001749
- Added to NRHP: February 4, 2003

The Middlesex Fells Reservation Parkways are the roadways within and bordering on the Middlesex Fells Reservation, a state park in the northern suburbs of Boston, Massachusetts, United States. The park includes portions of the towns of Malden, Medford, Melrose, Stoneham, and Winchester. The roads inside the park and around its perimeter have been listed on the National Register of Historic Places. Other portions of some of the roads are covered by more than one listing in the national register; see Fellsway Connector Parkways and Middlesex Fells Reservoirs Historic District.

The Middlesex Fells Reservation is one of the oldest and largest of the parks in the Metropolitan Park System of Greater Boston. The reservation was created in 1894 with a gift of 450 hectares (1,100 acres) of land from The Trustees of Reservations to the Metropolitan Parks Commission, predecessor organization to the Metropolitan District Commission and today's Massachusetts Department of Conservation and Recreation (DCR). By 1897 the park had been expanded to some 3,000 acres (1,200 ha). This area included some existing roadways, which became internal roadways of the park. The border roads that surround the park followed a principle articulated by landscape designer Charles Eliot, who was instrumental in the preservation of the Fells, that such roads clearly delineated the bounds of the park, and provided its neighbors with pleasing views.

== Border parkways ==
The parkways are described here in clockwise order, beginning in the south. These roads are generally two-lane paved roads, about 30 feet (9.1 m) wide, and in some cases briefly pass through portions of the reservation.

=== South Border Road ===
South Border Road runs from Roosevelt Circle, a major interchange including Interstate 93 and Fellsway West (Massachusetts Route 28) in Medford, along the southwestern border of the reservation, northwest into Winchester, where it ends at a junction that includes Highland Avenue, a noncontributing road that borders the reservation on the west, and the Mystic Valley Parkway, a parkway that joins the reservation to the DCR lands of the Mystic River Reservation. There are small, mostly unpaved, parking areas on the reservation side of the road providing access to trails. There is a small dead-end spur of the road that resulted from the construction of I-93, and there is a roughly 1-mile (1.6 km) section which runs inside the reservation as a result of land acquisitions south of the road.

=== Hillcrest Parkway ===
Hillcrest Parkway is a U-shaped road, both of whose ends are on Highland Avenue in Winchester. The parkway is, at 4,000 feet (1,200 m), one of the shorter parkways in the system. The west side of the parkway (the inside of the U) consists of residential properties, most of which were developed in the early 20th century; the reservation is to the east. This roadway, which does not generally carry through traffic, is only 24 feet (7.3 m) wide and is unstriped. There is a scenic view of the North Reservoir near its northern end. The Near this point there was formerly a junction with a North Border Road, which has been fragmented and rerouted in part by the construction of I-93 and partially converted to hiking trails, and is not considered part of the National Register listing.

=== South Street and Pond Street ===
South Street runs from Main Street in Stoneham, at its junction with a newer section of North Border Road, for about 0.25 miles (0.40 km) east-southeast to a point where it merges into Pond Street. There is a grassy area, including a parking area, that provides fine views of Spot Pond, along this stretch of road. A non-park portion of Pond Street extends north toward the center of Stoneham, while the parkway section extends south into the interior of the park, flanking the eastern shore of Spot Pond. At its junction with Woodland Road it runs eastward to a junction with Fellsway East and the Lynn Fells Parkway, the latter a connecting parkway joining the Fells to the Breakheart Reservation. The section along the pond is four lanes wide, with opposing travel lanes separated by a wide grassy median.

=== Fellsway East ===
The northernmost section of Fellsway East runs either within or on the border of the Fells. From the junction with Pond Street in Stoneham, it runs south, forming a small miter (triangular) junction with Ravine Road, before passing, shortly afterward entering Melrose. After it passes Washington Street, a municipal road heading southeast, it passes through a heavily wooded section of the park before reaching its junction with the East Border Road in Malden. The roadway continues south from this junction as a connecting parkway.

=== East Border Road ===
East Border Road runs west from its junction with Summer Street, a Malden municipal street, through the intersection with Fellsway East, along the heavily wooded southern flank of the park, to a junction with Highland Avenue, a municipal street in Medford. A short stretch of Highland runs north along the park border to a circular intersection with Woodland Road and Elm Street; this stretch of Highland is not part of the National Register listing.

=== Elm Street ===
Elm Street continues to follow the southern flank of the park westward from the junction with Woodland Road and East Border Road, running west to a junction with Fellsway West. There is a parking area, with access to Wright's Pond, on this stretch of road.

=== Fellsway West ===
Fellsway West is partly a border parkway and partly internal; the border section of the parkway connects Elm Street to Roosevelt Circle. North of this junction only about 2,000 feet (610 m) of roadway are part of the original parkway design, having been extensively altered by the construction of I-93 along the same corridor. The internal section provides access to some centrally located reservation resources; the historic border section now consists of a one-way stretch of road that runs from the northeast side of Roosevelt Circle, while a modern one-way section runs south from the Elm Street junction, over I-93, to join Roosevelt Circle at the northwest, near the junction with South Border Road.

== Interior parkways ==
The interior parkways (excluding portions of the border roads that run through parts of the reservation) are described roughly from east to west.

=== Ravine Road ===
Ravine Road is a relatively short (3,000-foot (910 m)) roadway connecting Woodland Road in the west to Fellsway East. The roadway is only 28 feet (8.5 m) wide, and is heavily forested on both sides. The ravine for which it is named contains Spot Pond Brook, and lies just to the north, but is not visible from the roadway.

=== Woodland Road ===
Woodland Road is one of the two major north–south parkways through the reservation. It is a four-lane roadway with a grassy median for most of its length, running south from South Street in Stoneham to a junction with Elm Street and Highland Avenue in Medford. Its major intersections are designed as small rotaries, and it provides access to the Spot Pond area, the visitor center at the John Bottume House, and the Metropolitan District Commission Pumping House.

=== Fellsway West ===
The interior reservation parkway portion of Fellsway West runs north from the junction with Elm Street in Medford to a junction with North Border Road and South Street in Stoneham. Because it has been significantly altered by the construction of adjacent I-93, most of this portion of parkway is not included in the National Register listing. The parkway provides access to the most centrally located parking area of the reservation, the Lower Sheepfold lot.

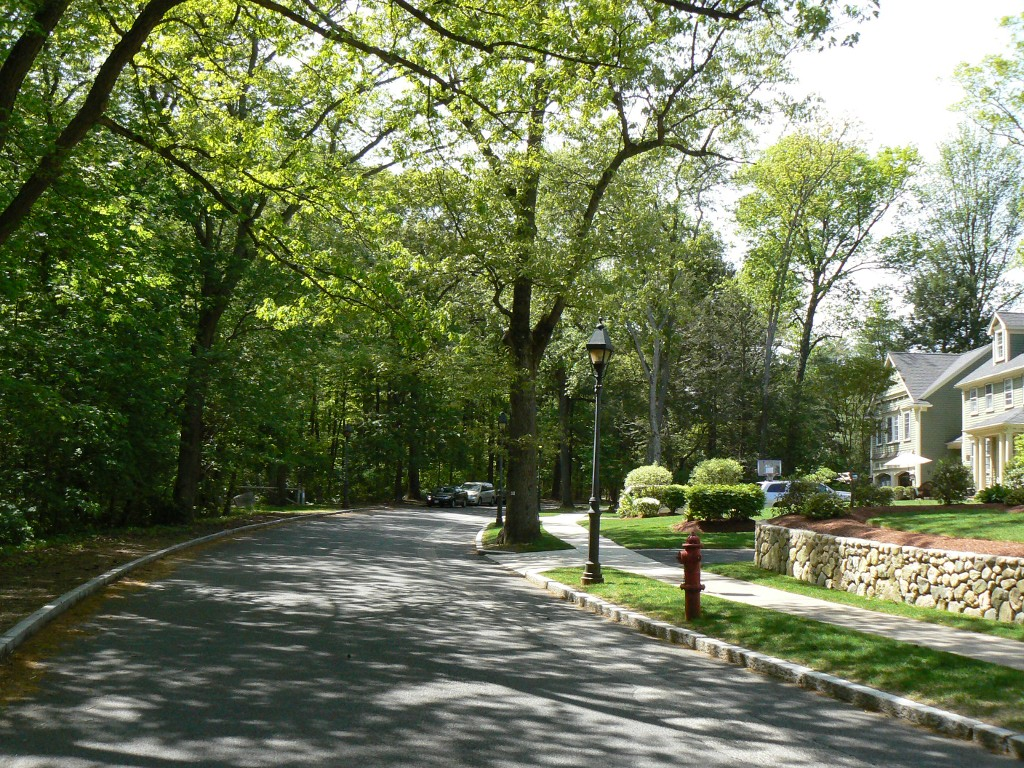
Hillcrest Parkway in Winchester

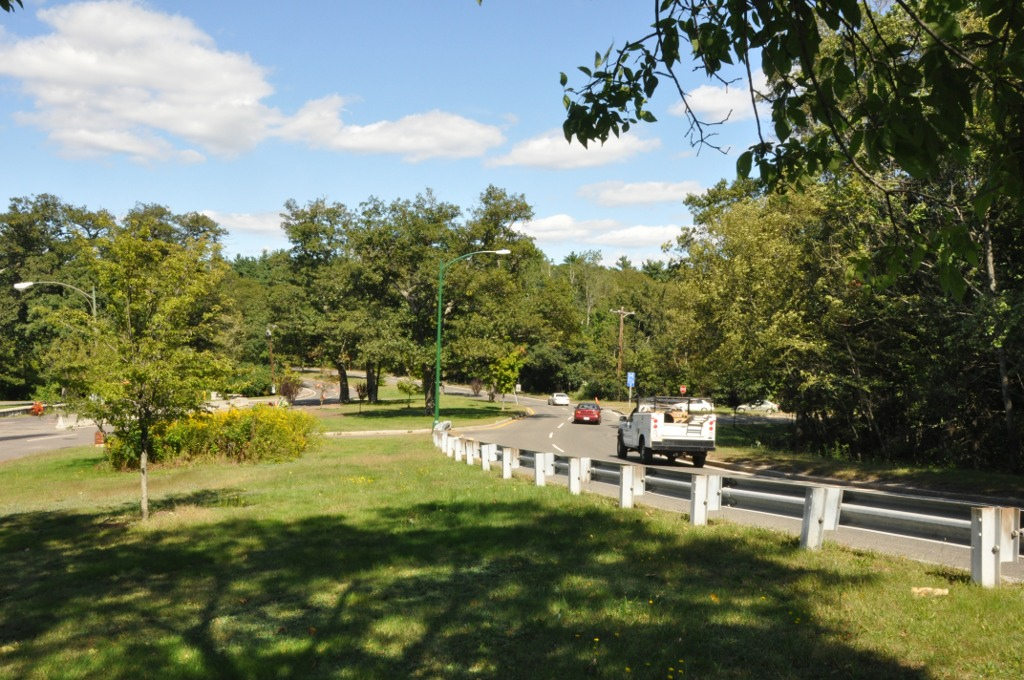
Woodland Road near Ravine Road and the John Bottume House in Stoneham

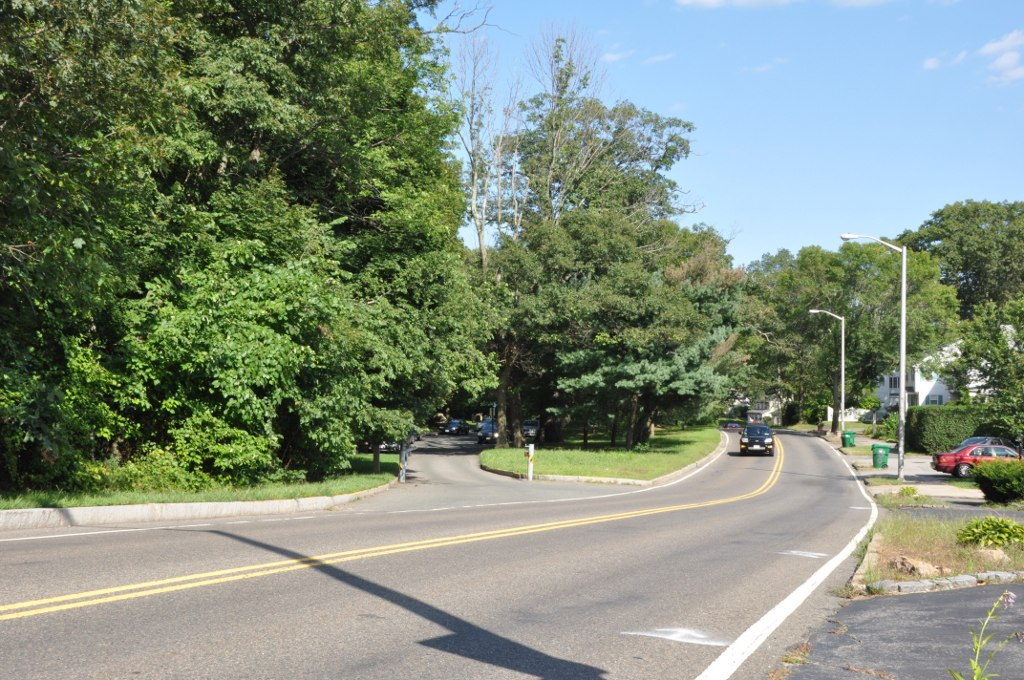
South Border Road in Medford

== See also ==
- Middlesex Fells Reservoirs Historic District
- Fells Connector Parkways, which connect the Middlesex Fells Reservation to the Mystic River Reservation
- Lynn Fells Parkway, which connects the reservation to the Breakheart Reservation
- National Register of Historic Places listings in Middlesex County, Massachusetts
