= Fells Connector Parkways =

Parkways in Greater Boston, Massachusetts

- Fells Connector Parkways, Metropolitan System of Greater Boston
- U.S. National Register of Historic Places
- U.S. Historic district
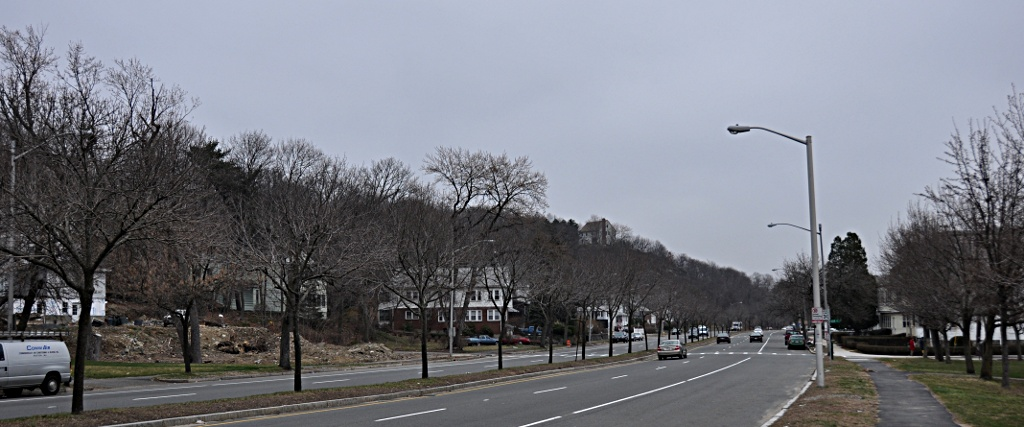
- Fellsway West in Medford

- Location within Massachusetts Location within the United States
- Location: Malden and Medford, Massachusetts
- Coordinates: 42°26′40″N 71°4′45″W
- Built: 1895
- Architect: Eliot, Charles; Olmsted Brothers
- MPS: Metropolitan Park System of Greater Boston MPS
- NRHP reference No.: 03000379
- Added to NRHP: May 9, 2003

The Fells Connector Parkways are a group of historic parkways in the cities of Malden and Medford, Massachusetts, suburbs north of the city of Boston. The three parkways, The Fellsway, Fellsway West, and Fellsway East serve to provide access from the lower portion of the Mystic River Reservation to the Middlesex Fells Reservation. The latter two parkways continue northward, providing access to the interior of the Fells and providing a further connection to Lynn Fells Parkway. Significant portions of these parkways south of the Fells, which were among the first connecting parkways designed to be part of the Metropolitan Park System of Greater Boston by Charles Eliot, were listed on the National Register of Historic Places in 2003.

== Background ==
Following the enactment of authorizing legislation in 1894, the Metropolitan Parks Commission (predecessor to the Metropolitan District Commission (MDC) and today's Massachusetts Department of Conservation and Recreation (DCR)) began working with Charles Eliot to plan a parkway to provide access from Boston to the Middlesex Fells Reservation. This job was made difficult due to the existence of relatively densely populated areas between the Mystic River and the reservation. The plan that the commission and Eliot finally drafted called for an arterial trunk (The Fellsway), which would run north through Medford and Malden, and then split into two branches. Fellsway West would provide access to the promontory point at Pine Hill in Medford (now visible on the west side of Interstate 93) and the western parts of the reservation, while Fellsway East would provide access to Bear's Den Hill in Malden, and points east. These corridors were wide (120-foot (37 m)) rights of way, in order to provide for several modes of transportation: automobile, street car, and pedestrians and cyclists.

== The Fellsway ==
Fellsway
- Location: Somerville–Medford
- Length: 2.2 mi (3.5 km)
- Existed: 1896–present

Land for The Fellsway was acquired in 1896. Its original southern terminus was at Mystic Avenue in Somerville, and was further extended south to Broadway in 1898. The Somerville section of the parkway south of Mystic Avenue later became part of the McGrath Highway, and the intervening section was extensively altered by the construction of I-93. The Fellsway is designated Massachusetts Route 28 for its entire length. From Somerville it crosses the Mystic River into Medford on the Wellington Bridge and soon enters the Wellington Circle interchange, where it joins with Mystic Valley Parkway and Revere Beach Parkway, both designated Massachusetts Route 16. It crosses into Malden near Devir Park, shortly before it ends at the junction with Fellsway West and Fellsway East. The Medford and Malden portions of The Fellsway, including its medians and Wellington Circle, are part of the National Register listing for the Fells Connector Parkways.

Major intersections

The entire route is in Middlesex County.

Location	mi	km	Destinations	Notes
Somerville	0.0	0.0	Route 28 south (McGrath Highway) – Somerville	Route 28 continues south
Somerville	0.0	0.0	I-93 / Route 38 – Boston, Sullivan Square, Medford, Concord, NH	Exit 29 on I-93
Mystic River	0.5	0.80	Wellington Bridge	
Medford	0.8	1.3	Route 16 – Arlington, Watertown, Everett, Revere	Intersection with Mystic Valley and Revere Beach Parkways
Malden	2.2	3.5	Fellsway East to US 1	Route 28 continues north as Fellsway West
1.000 mi = 1.609 km; 1.000 km = 0.621 mi: Route transition

== Fellsway West ==
Fellsway West
- Location: Medford–Stoneham
- Length: 3.6 mi (5.8 km)
- Existed: 1896–present

Portions of the Fellsway West right of way were acquired in 1896; the rest were obtained in 1897. The eastern portion followed an existing alignment along Medford's Valley Street. The road runs west from the northern end of The Fellsway, soon after crossing Massachusetts Route 60 just across the Malden-Medford line in Medford. At Fulton Street the road turns north, paralleling Interstate 93 to Roosevelt Circle, which is where it terminated when completed in 1898. From Roosevelt Circle it continues northward into the Fells, in an extension constructed between 1905 and 1908, and was fully extended to Stoneham in 1931. The section from a point about 2,000 feet (610 m) north of Roosevelt Circle has been extensively altered due to the construction of I-93. Only the section between Fulton Street and The Fellsway is part of the National Register listing for the Fells Connector Parkways; the section immediately north of Roosevelt Circle is included in the Middlesex Fells Reservation Parkways listing. Fellsway West is designated Massachusetts Route 28 for its entire length.

Major intersections

The entire route is in Middlesex County.

Location	mi	km	Destinations	Notes
Malden	0.0	0.0	Route 28 south (Fellsway) / Fellsway East north	No southbound access to Fellsway East
Medford	0.2	0.32	Route 60 – Malden, Revere, Waltham	
Medford	1.0	1.6	I-93 / South Border Road – Boston, Winchester, Concord, NH	Roosevelt Circle; exit 33 on I-93
Stoneham	2.6– 3.3	4.2– 5.3	I-93 south – Boston	Entrance from I-93 north only; exit 34 on I-93
Stoneham	3.6	5.8	Route 28 north / North Border Road to I-93 north – Lawrence, Concord, NH	Route 28 continues north
1.000 mi = 1.609 km; 1.000 km = 0.621 mi: Incomplete access

== Fellsway East ==
Fellsway East
- Location: Malden–Stoneham
- Length: 2.6 mi (4.2 km)
- Existed: 1896–present

Fellsway East runs north from the interchange with The Fellsway and Fellsway West, with its entire length in Malden, Melrose, and Stoneham. The oldest portion runs to East Border Road at the southern edge of the Fells, crossing Massachusetts Route 60 and passing Fellsmere Park. Except for a brief section, it is a broad multilane boulevard with an impressive tree canopy over the northern part, and is the best preserved section of the Fells Connector Parkways. From the junction with East Border Road, it becomes a narrow park road, passing into a heavily wooded section of the Fells Reservation in Melrose. It then becomes a border road, skirting the eastern edge of the reservation in Melrose before reaching its end at a junction with Pond Street and Lynn Fells Parkway in Stoneham. The section of this parkway south of East Border Road is listed as part of the Fellsway Connector Parkways; the northern section is listed as part of the Middlesex Fells Reservation Parkways.

Major intersections

The entire route is in Middlesex County.

Location	mi	km	Destinations	Notes
Malden	0.0	0.0	Route 28 (Fellsway south / Fellsway West north) – Boston, Stoneham	
Malden	0.2	0.32	Pleasant Street (Route 60)	No signage for Route 60
Stoneham	2.6	4.2	Pond Street / Lynn Fells Parkway to I-93 / Route 28 – Spot Pond, Medford	Continues north as Lynn Fells Parkway
1.000 mi = 1.609 km; 1.000 km = 0.621 mi

== Alterations ==
Several significant alterations have been made to these roadways since they were first laid out. Streetcar lines ran all the way along The Fellsway and Fellsway West from 1907 into the 1940s, and eventually reached all the way to Stoneham Square. This service was cut back to run only along the Fellsway, and completely discontinued in the 1950s. The Wellington Bridge, originally a drawbridge, was replaced in 1914. Roosevelt Circle was built (as a surface rotary) in the 1930s to address increasing traffic volume, and was replaced by the present aerial rotary with the construction of I-93 in the late 1950s. Wellington Circle, originally a rotary, was extensively redesigned in 1941 and again in 1956. The southernmost section of the Fellsway was effectively obliterated by the construction of I-93 through Somerville.

== See also ==
- Middlesex Fells Reservoirs Historic District
- Middlesex Fells Reservation Parkways, the parkways bordering and within the Middlesex Fells Reservation
- Mystic Valley Parkway, the parkway of the Mystic River Reservation
- Lynn Fells Parkway, a parkway connecting the Middlesex Fells to the Breakheart Reservation
- Revere Beach Parkway
- National Register of Historic Places listings in Medford, Massachusetts
- National Register of Historic Places listings in Middlesex County, Massachusetts
