= MA-60 =

MA-60 or MA 60 may refer to:

- Massachusetts Route 60, a road in the U.S.
- Xian MA60, a Chinese airliner
