= Massachusetts Route 16 =

Highway in Massachusetts

Route 16
- Route 16 highlighted in red

Route information
- Maintained by MassDOT
- Length: 59.8646 mi (96.3427 km)

Major junctions
- West end: Route 12 / Route 193 in Webster
- I-395 in Webster; Route 146 in Uxbridge; Route 9 in Wellesley; I-95 / Route 128 in Newton; Route 30 / Commonwealth Ave. in Newton; I-90 Toll / Mass Pike in Newton; US 20 in Watertown; US 3 / Route 2 in Cambridge; I-93 in Medford; US 1 in Revere
- East end: Route 1A / Route 60 in Revere

Location
- Country: United States
- State: Massachusetts
- Counties: Worcester, Middlesex, Norfolk, Suffolk

Highway system
- Massachusetts State Highway System; Interstate; US; State
← Route 15	→ Route 17

Route 16 is a 59.8646-mile-long (96.3427 km) east–west state highway in Massachusetts. It begins in the west at an intersection with Route 12 and Route 193 in Webster, just north of the Connecticut state border. It runs in a generally southwest-northeast routing through a number of Boston's suburbs and runs to the west and then north of the city before ending in Revere at an intersection with Route 1A and Route 60.

From Watertown eastward, Route 16 is a multi-lane arterial road, although it is not limited access for any significant length. Segments of Route 16 through this area are also known as the Mystic Valley Parkway, the Alewife Brook Parkway, and the Revere Beach Parkway, among other names.

For a long stretch it runs concurrently with Route 30 (Commonwealth Avenue) in Newton, and this portion of the route serves as a part of the Boston Marathon, from the halfway point to just before Mile 18 and the hills.

== Route description ==
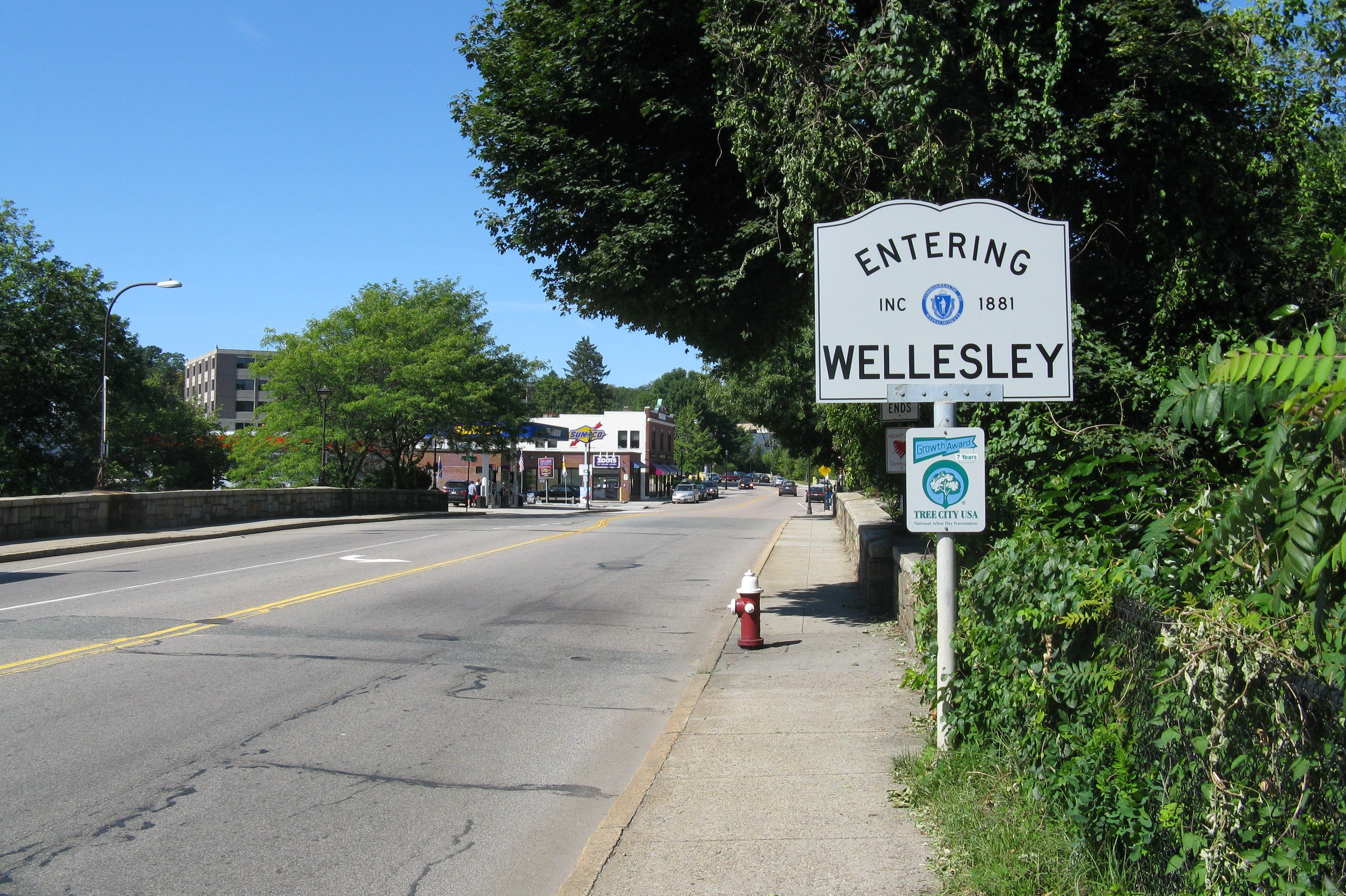
Westbound entering Wellesley

=== Webster to Milford ===
Route 16 begins at Routes 12 and 193, not far from the Connecticut border. In Webster, along the shore of Lake Chaubunagungamaug, it intersects I-395.

After passing I-395, the route continues to the northeast, going through Douglas (with a trip through the Douglas State Forest), the Blackstone River Valley National Heritage Corridor, Uxbridge, Mendon, Hopedale, and Milford, where it crosses the Charles River and then passes beneath I-495 (without access).

=== Milford to Newton ===
From I-495, Route 16 goes northeasterly past Holliston and the Elm Bank Reservation in Sherborn. The road then crosses into Natick, as Eliot Street, while traveling next to the Dover line, and goes through Wellesley (as Washington Street), where Wellesley College and Babson College are located. The route enters Newton and Middlesex County by crossing over the Charles River.

=== Newton to Revere ===
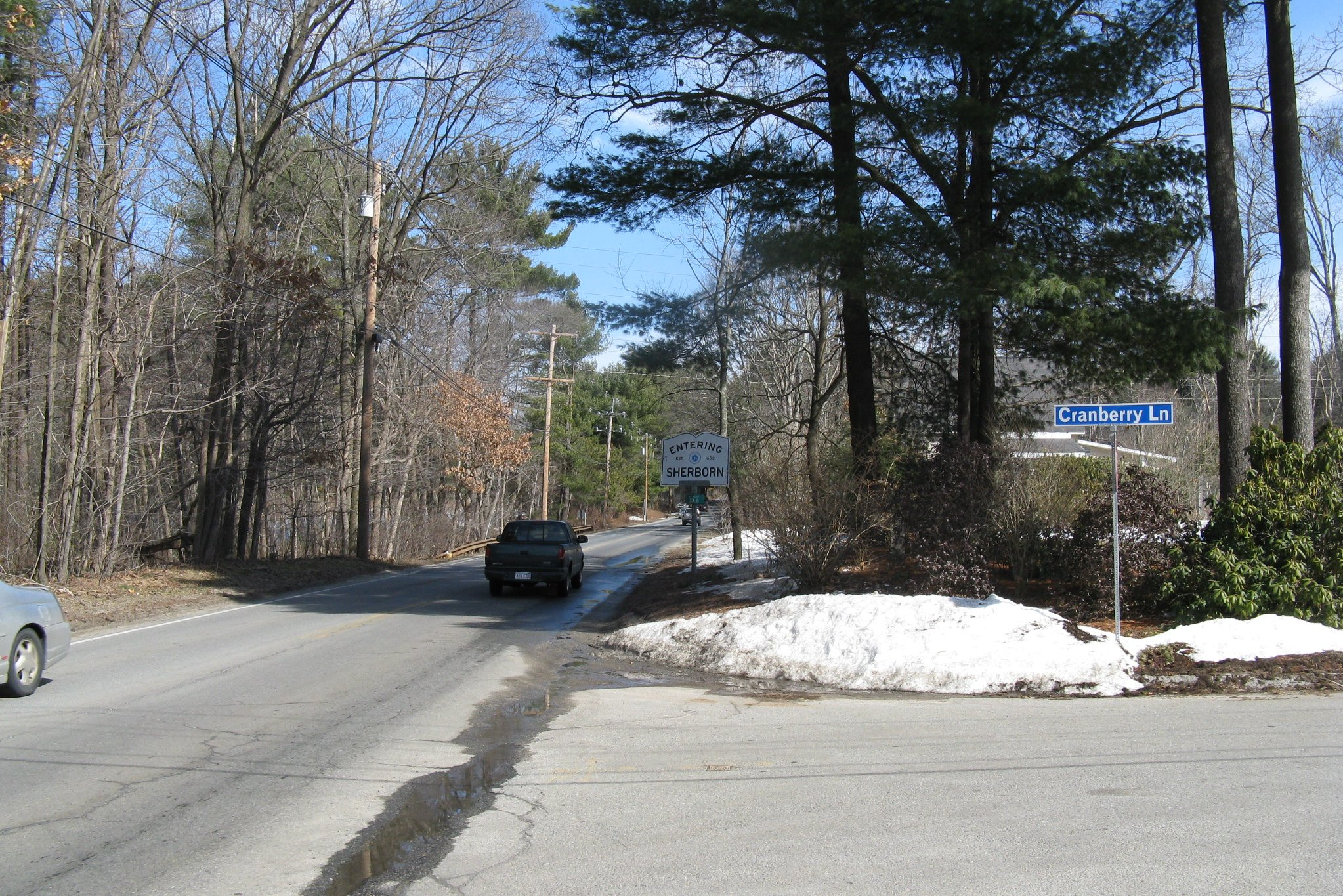
Eastbound entering Sherborn

In Newton Lower Falls, Route 16 crosses (to the north of the Charles River Reservation) Route 128 (Interstate 95) and intersects the west end of Beacon Street before passing Lasell University and crossing Route 30. It later crosses I-90, the Massachusetts Turnpike (known colloquially as the Pike), in West Newton; Pike Exit 125 (old Exit 16) here provides access to and from the east only. After looping around over the interstate (with West Newton's commuter rail station immediately below), it enters Watertown shortly before again crossing the Charles River, and intersects U.S. Route 20 in Watertown Square. Route 16 also contains trolleybuses from Watertown Square station until the intersection with Brattle Street. The route passes by Mount Auburn Cemetery before entering Cambridge. Continuing east, Route 16 joins U.S. Route 3 and Route 2, turning north to pass by Fresh Pond and the large parking garage at the MBTA Alewife Station. From there, Route 2 splits off at the eastern end of the freeway portion of the Concord Turnpike, while Routes 3 and 16 continue north on Alewife Brook Parkway. Route 3 exits west at Massachusetts Avenue, while Route 16 continues north on the parkway into Somerville, meeting up with the Mystic Valley Parkway just south of the Mystic River.

Route 16 follows the Mystic Valley Parkway generally eastward, traveling beside the Mystic River downstream and eventually crossing it into Medford. It soon is joined from the north by Massachusetts Route 38, and shortly after enters a mile long freeway segment, bypassing downtown Medford (after recrossing the river), where Route 38 exits to the south on Main Street. Route 16 then crosses Interstate 93 in a series of ramps that include onramps to the north and south of I-93 from Route 16's eastbound lanes, and a ramp from I-93 southbound to Route 16 east. Route 16 then crosses the Mystic River again, reaching the Wellington Circle junction with Massachusetts Route 28 in Medford. This junction marks the end of the Mystic Valley Parkway and the beginning of the Revere Beach Parkway, on which Route 16 continues eastward, passing the Wellington MBTA station and crossing the Malden River. The route continues east through Everett (where it has an interchange with Massachusetts Route 99) and Chelsea, where it has an interchange with U.S. Route 1 at the border with Revere. The stretch between Wellington Circle and Route 1 is characterized by a fairly dense mixture of residential, industrial, and commercial uses, in contrast to the more residential and park-like settings of the section between Wellington and Route 2.

Continuing eastward from Route 1, eastbound Route 16 enters a second mile-long limited-access segment (while westbound Route 16 continues to have houses and other development along it, which are inaccessible from the eastbound lanes). Route 16 has an interchange with Massachusetts Route 107 at Cronin Park before heading north to a junction with Winthrop Ave, where the Revere Beach Parkway and Massachusetts Route 145 turn right. Route 16 goes a short way further north, before it ends near Revere Beach and the Atlantic Ocean at Timothy J. Mahoney Circle, a junction with Routes 1A and 60 in Revere.

== History ==
Parts of Route 16 were historically maintained by the Metropolitan District Commission (MDC), and while the MDC no longer exists, the parkway portions of the route are still patrolled by the Massachusetts State Police and maintained by the Massachusetts Department of Conservation and Recreation as a remnant of the former MDC jurisdiction.

== Major intersections ==
County	Location	mi	km	Destinations	Notes
Worcester	Webster	0.00	0.00	Route 12 / Route 193 south to Route 197 – Webster, Dudley, Putnam, CT, Oxford	Northern terminus of Route 193 and to Route 197 via south in Dudley
Worcester	Webster	0.20	0.32	I-395 – Norwich, CT, New London, CT, Oxford, Worcester	Exit 3 on I-395; partial cloverleaf interchange; former Route 52
Worcester	Douglas	6.91	11.12	Route 96 south – Harrisville, RI	Northern terminus of Route 96
Worcester	Uxbridge	12.20	19.63	Route 146 – Providence, RI, Sutton, Worcester	Exit 6 on Route 146; diamond interchange
Worcester	Uxbridge	14.40	23.17	Route 122 (King Street) – Worcester, Northbridge, Blackstone	Brief concurrency
Worcester	Milford	21.40	34.44	Route 140 – Bellingham, Upton, Shrewsbury	
Worcester	Milford	22.90	36.85	Route 85 north to I-495 – Hopkinton, Southborough	Southern terminus of Route 85
Worcester	Milford	23.30	37.50	Route 109 east to I-495 – Medway, Dover	Western terminus of Route 109
Middlesex	Holliston	27.30	43.94	Route 126 south – West Medway, Woonsocket, RI	Southern terminus of concurrency with Route 126
Middlesex	Holliston	29.60	47.64	Route 126 north (Concord Street) – Ashland, Framingham	Northern terminus of concurrency with Route 126
Middlesex	Sherborn	33.00	53.11	Route 27 south – Medfield, Walpole	Southern terminus of concurrency with Route 27
Middlesex	Sherborn	33.30	53.59	Route 27 north – Natick, Wayland	Northern terminus of concurrency with Route 27
Norfolk	Wellesley	39.10	62.93	Route 135 west – Framingham, Hopkinton	Western terminus of concurrency with Route 135
Norfolk	Wellesley	39.30	63.25	Route 135 east – Needham, Dedham	Eastern terminus of concurrency with Route 135
Norfolk	Wellesley	40.70	65.50	Route 9 – Brookline, Boston, Framingham Center, Worcester	Partial interchange via Worcester and Grantland Roads
Middlesex	Newton	42.20	67.91	I-95 / Route 128 – Canton, Providence, RI, Portsmouth, NH	Exits 37A-B on I-95; partial cloverleaf interchange
Middlesex	Newton	43.40	69.85	Route 30 (Commonwealth Avenue) – Weston, Framingham, Newton Center, Boston	
Middlesex	Newton	44.00	70.81	I-90 Toll east / Mass Pike east – Boston	Eastbound exit and westbound entrance; exit 125 on I-90 / Mass Pike
Middlesex	Watertown	46.80	75.32	US 20 – Waltham, Brighton	Watertown Square
Middlesex	Cambridge	49.40	79.50	US 3 south / Route 2 east – Boston	Southern terminus of concurrency with US 3 / Route 2
Middlesex	Cambridge	50.70	81.59	Route 2 west (Cambridge Turnpike) – Concord	Northern terminus of concurrency with Route 2
Middlesex	Cambridge	51.10	82.24	US 3 north / Route 2A (Massachusetts Avenue) – Arlington, Winchester, Lexington, Cambridge	Northern terminus of concurrency with US 3
Middlesex	Somerville	52.14	83.91	Mystic Valley Parkway west – Arlington	
Middlesex	Medford	53.00	85.30	Route 38 (College Avenue) – Somerville	
Middlesex	Medford	53.50	86.10	I-93 south – Boston	Eastbound exit and westbound entrance; exit 22 on I-93
Middlesex	Medford	53.50	86.10	I-93 north – Concord, NH	Westbound exit and eastbound entrance; exit 22 on I-93
Middlesex	Medford	53.59	86.24	Powder House Square	
Middlesex	Medford	55.30	89.00	Route 28 (Fellsway) – Somerville, Boston, Malden, Reading	
Middlesex	Everett	56.10	90.28	Route 99 (Broadway) – Malden, Boston	Dual rotary intersection, with Main Street; Sweetser Circle
Suffolk	Revere	58.50	94.15	US 1 north – Saugus, Peabody	Interchange; eastbound exit and westbound entrance
Suffolk	Revere	58.50	94.15	US 1 south – Tobin Bridge, Boston	Interchange; westbound exit and eastbound entrance
Suffolk	Revere	58.80	94.63	Route 107 north – Revere, Chelsea, Lynn	Interchange with Broadway; southern terminus of Route 107
Suffolk	Revere	59.6	95.9	Route 145 south (Revere Beach Parkway) – Revere Beach, Winthrop	Northern terminus of Route 145
Suffolk	Revere	59.8646	96.3427	Route 1A / Route 60 west to US 1 – Revere Beach, Lynn, Malden, New Hampshire, Maine, Sumner Tunnel, Boston	Rotary; eastern terminus of Route 60
1.000 mi = 1.609 km; 1.000 km = 0.621 mi: Concurrency terminus; Electronic toll collection; Incomplete access
