= Lynn Fells Parkway =

Parkway in Greater Boston, Massachusetts

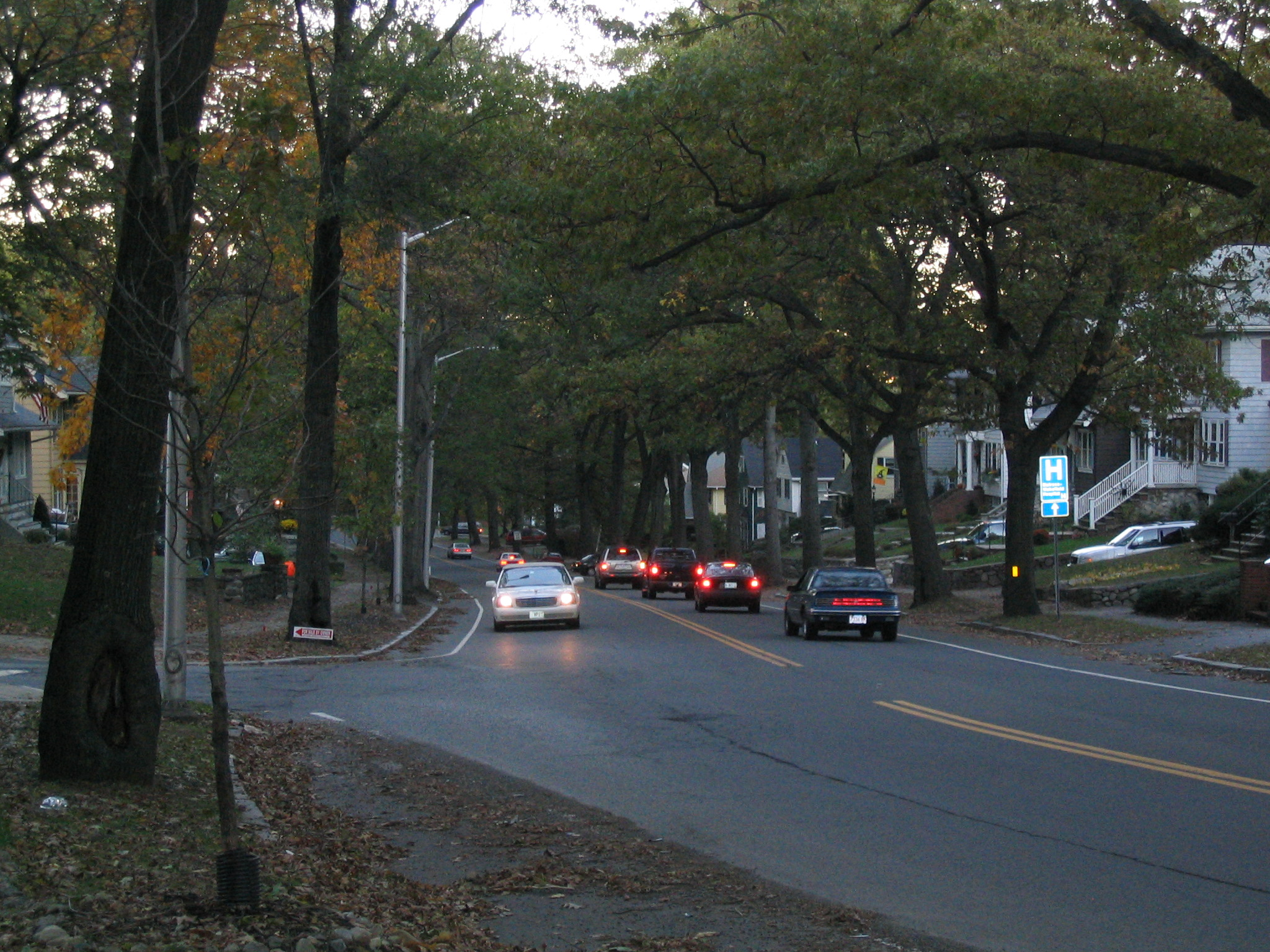
- Lynn Fells Parkway near Warwick Road in Melrose
- Interactive map of Lynn Fells Parkway
- Maintained by: Department of Conservation and Recreation
- Length: 4.0 mi (6.4 km)
- Location: Greater Boston, Massachusetts
- West end: Fellsway East in Stoneham
- East end: US 1 in Saugus
- Lynn Fells Parkway, Metropolitan Park System of Greater Boston
- U.S. National Register of Historic Places
- U.S. Historic district
- Location within Massachusetts Location within the United States
- Location: Melrose, Saugus, and Stoneham, Massachusetts
- MPS: Metropolitan Park System of Greater Boston MPS
- NRHP reference No.: 03000380
- Added to NRHP: May 9, 2003

Lynn Fells Parkway is a parkway in Greater Boston, Massachusetts, in the United States. It is maintained by the Massachusetts Department of Conservation and Recreation. The road runs from the end of Fellsway East in Stoneham, eastward through Melrose, and ends in Saugus at US Route 1. The parkway serves as a connector between the Middlesex Fells Reservation and Breakheart Reservation.

== History ==
The parkway was proposed in 1897 as part of a wide-ranging series of interconnected parkways in the greater Boston area. The original proposal by the Olmsted Brothers landscape design firm was that the parkway would connect the Middlesex Fells to the Lynn Woods Reservation in Lynn, but the full proposal was never implemented. The first portion of the parkway, from the Stoneham-Melrose line to Main Street in Melrose, was built between 1906 and 1908, although a particularly difficult section, built on swampy land near Ell Pond Park, was not completed until 1911. Lack of funding stalled construction of additional sections until 1929, when construction to Route 1 was begun. Plans to continue the parkway to Lynn Woods only advanced as far as acquiring and grading a right of way from Route 1 to Walnut Street, part of which is now taken over by the figure-eight interchange between the two roads.

The Melrose/Saugus portion of the parkway was added to the National Register of Historic Places on May 9, 2003, listed along with other roadways of the Metropolitan Park System of Greater Boston. Contributing elements to the National Register listing, in addition to the roadway, are the tree canopy that shades much of the road, and the 1930 girder bridge that carries railroad tracks over the road between Vinton and Tremont Streets in Melrose.

== Major intersections ==
County	Location	mi	km	Destinations	Notes
Middlesex	Stoneham	0.0	0.0	Fellsway East / Pond Street to Route 28 / I-93 – Spot Pond, Medford	Continues south as Fellsway East
Essex	Saugus	3.8	6.1	US 1 north – Lynnfield, Newburyport	Interchange
Essex	Saugus	4.0	6.4	US 1 south – Boston	
1.000 mi = 1.609 km; 1.000 km = 0.621 mi

== See also ==
- Middlesex Fells Reservation Parkways
- Fells Connector Parkways
- Middlesex Fells Reservoirs Historic District
