= Massachusetts Route 38 =

State highway in Massachusetts, US

Route 38
- Route 38 highlighted in red

Route information
- Maintained by MassDOT
- Length: 26.5 mi (42.6 km)

Major junctions
- South end: Route 99 in Boston
- Route 28 in Somerville; Route 16 in Medford; I-95 / Route 128 in Woburn; I-495 in Tewksbury
- North end: NH 38 in Pelham, NH

Location
- Country: United States
- State: Massachusetts
- Counties: Middlesex, Suffolk

Highway system
- Massachusetts State Highway System; Interstate; US; State
← Route 37	→ Route 39
← Route 3A		→ Route 4
← Route 6A	N.E.	→ Route 7

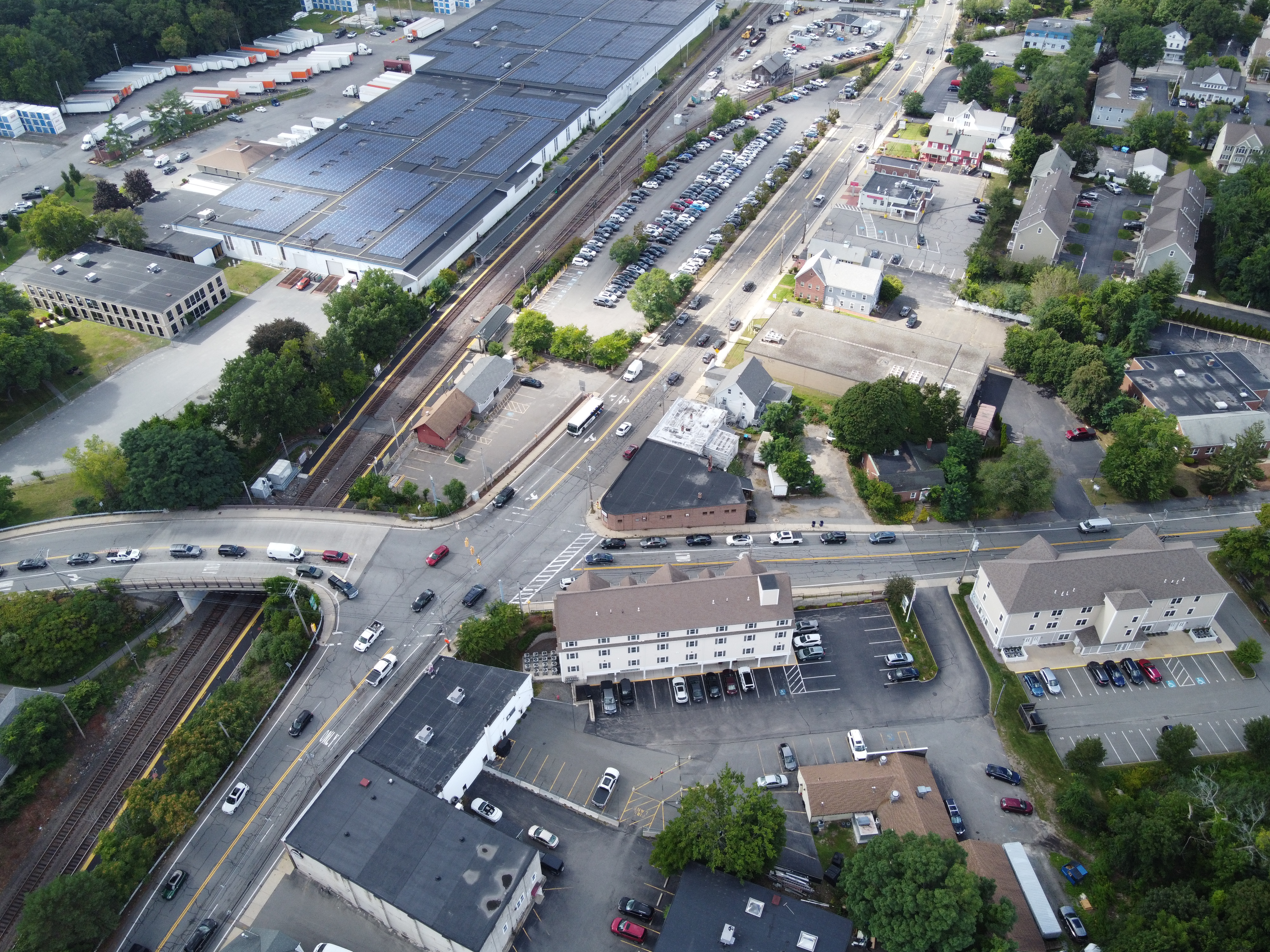
MA route 38 running concurrent with MA route 129 (vertical as pictured) in Wilmington, Massachusetts

Route 38 is a state highway in the U.S. state of Massachusetts, traveling 26.5 miles (42.6 km) from Route 28 in Somerville north via Lowell to the New Hampshire state line in Dracut, where it continues as New Hampshire Route 38 in Pelham, New Hampshire. Although its southern terminus is at Route 28, some signage indicates that Route 38 continues south towards Sullivan Square in Boston.

== History ==

The majority of Route 38 was originally designated as Route 6B in the New England road marking system, an alternate to New England Interstate Route 6. It began at Route 6 somewhere in Cambridge and made its way to present Route 38 in Somerville, running north on much the same alignment as is followed now, with the only real differences in Medford (where it used High Street (Route 60) rather than the Mystic Valley Parkway) and in Winchester center (where it ran via the rotary). In Lowell, Route 6B turned west on current Route 110, ending at the corner of Appleton Street and Gorham Street. (Route 6 came from the south on Gorham and turned west on Appleton; Route 6B came from the east on Appleton.)

In 1927, Route 6 became U.S. Route 3 north of Boston, and Route 6B became Route 3B. By 1928 the alignment in Cambridge was finalized. It began at the north end of the Boston University Bridge, which carried US 3 across the Charles River, and ran east on present Memorial Drive and Land Boulevard before turning north on the Northern Artery (present Route 28) to reach present Route 38 at Mystic Avenue. The whole alignment south of Mystic Avenue was shared with U.S. Route 1 and Route 28.

Between 1929 and 1933, Route 3B was renumbered Route 38. Between 1945 and 1950, it was extended north from Lowell to cross the Merrimack River on Gorham Street, then its present alignment to the newly formed New Hampshire Route 38. The present alignment in Lowell was adopted in or after 1954, when the new bridge across the Merrimack River was built.

By 1937, the concurrency with Route 60 in Medford was removed, and Route 38 was moved to use South Street between Main Street and Winthrop Street. Later it was shifted north to the Mystic Valley Parkway (Route 16) due to South Street becoming one-way eastbound.

In the early 1970s, many routes in the Boston area were renumbered or realigned. Route 38 was simply cut back to its split with Route 28, as it was concurrent with other routes the rest of the way to its southern end, and it was no longer tied to U.S. Route 3. At some point in the 1990s, directional signs were installed showing Route 38 continuing southeast from Route 28 towards Sullivan Square.

By 1989, Route 38 was moved to a short bypass around the rotary in Winchester center. Prior to that, it was coextant with Main Street all the way from the Medford-Winchester line to the Tewksbury-Lowell line. Even north of the Tewksbury-Lowell line, Main Street continues as Rogers Street for exactly one mile before Route 38 splits onto Nesmith Street towards Route 110; Main Street finally ends under the mentioned Rogers Street name around 3,000 feet (910 m) after that split at Lawrence Street in downtown Lowell.

== Major intersections ==
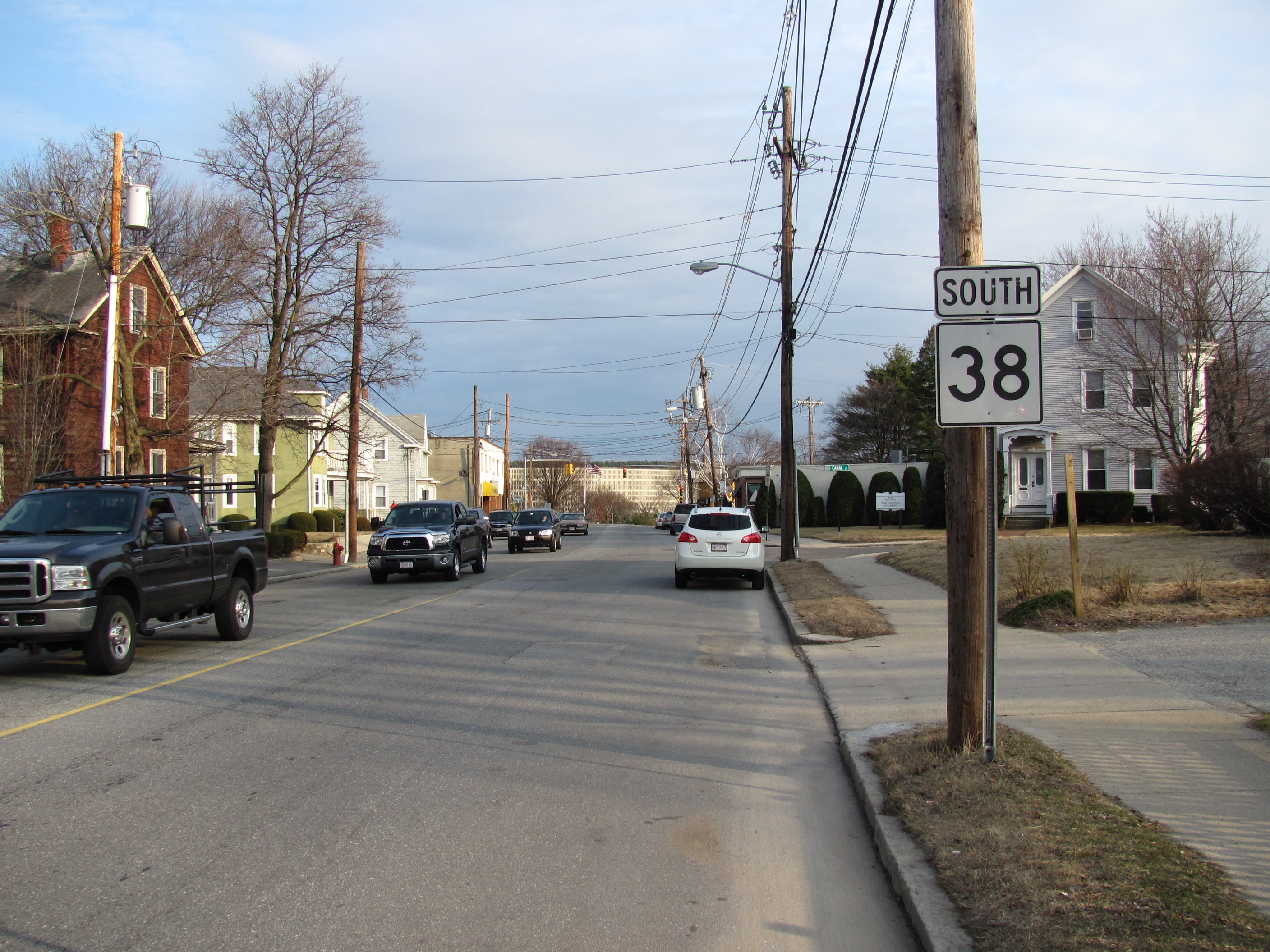
Southbound entering Winchester

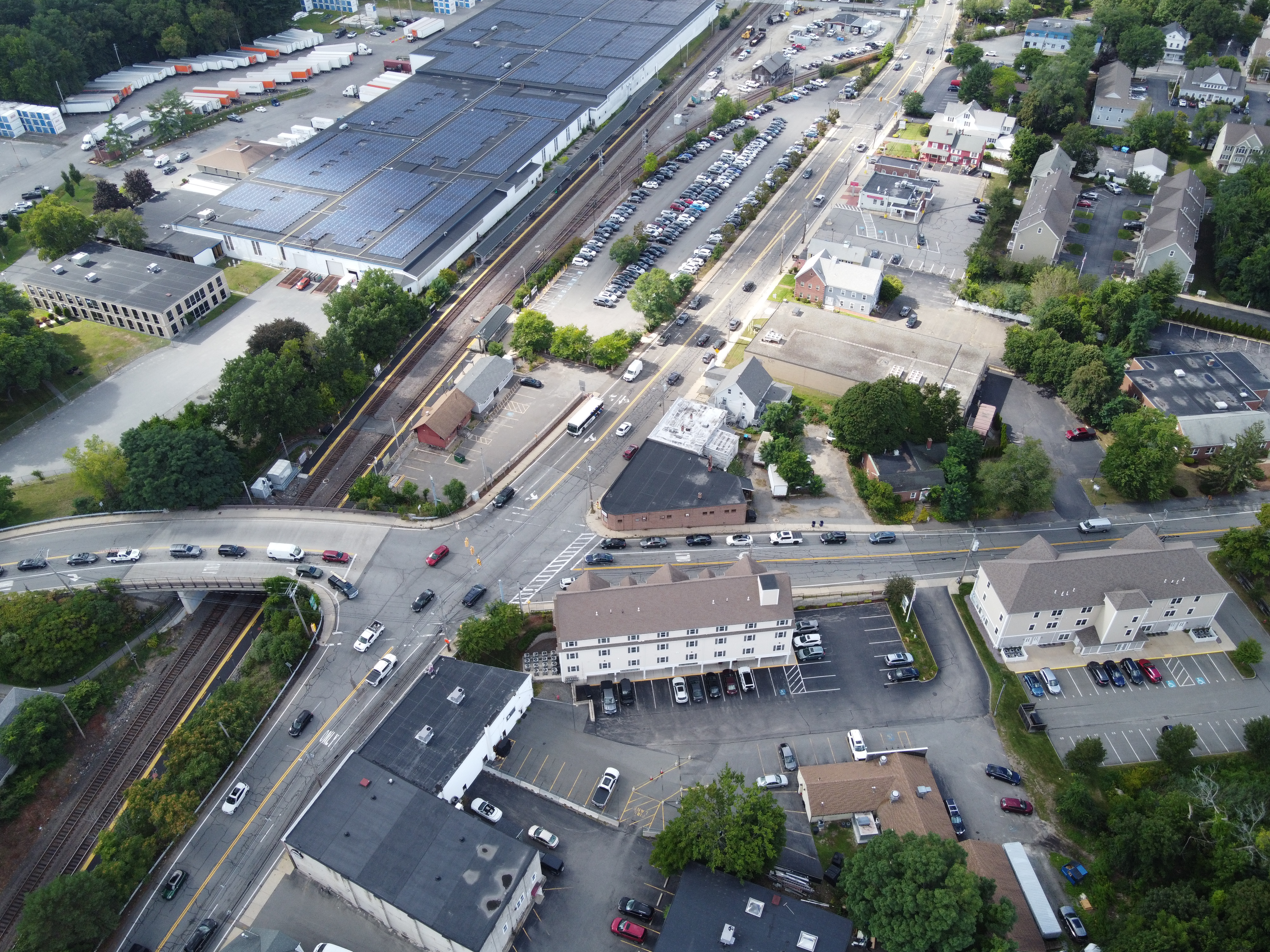
The intersection of MA routes 38 and 129 with MA route 62, located in Wilmington, Massachusetts

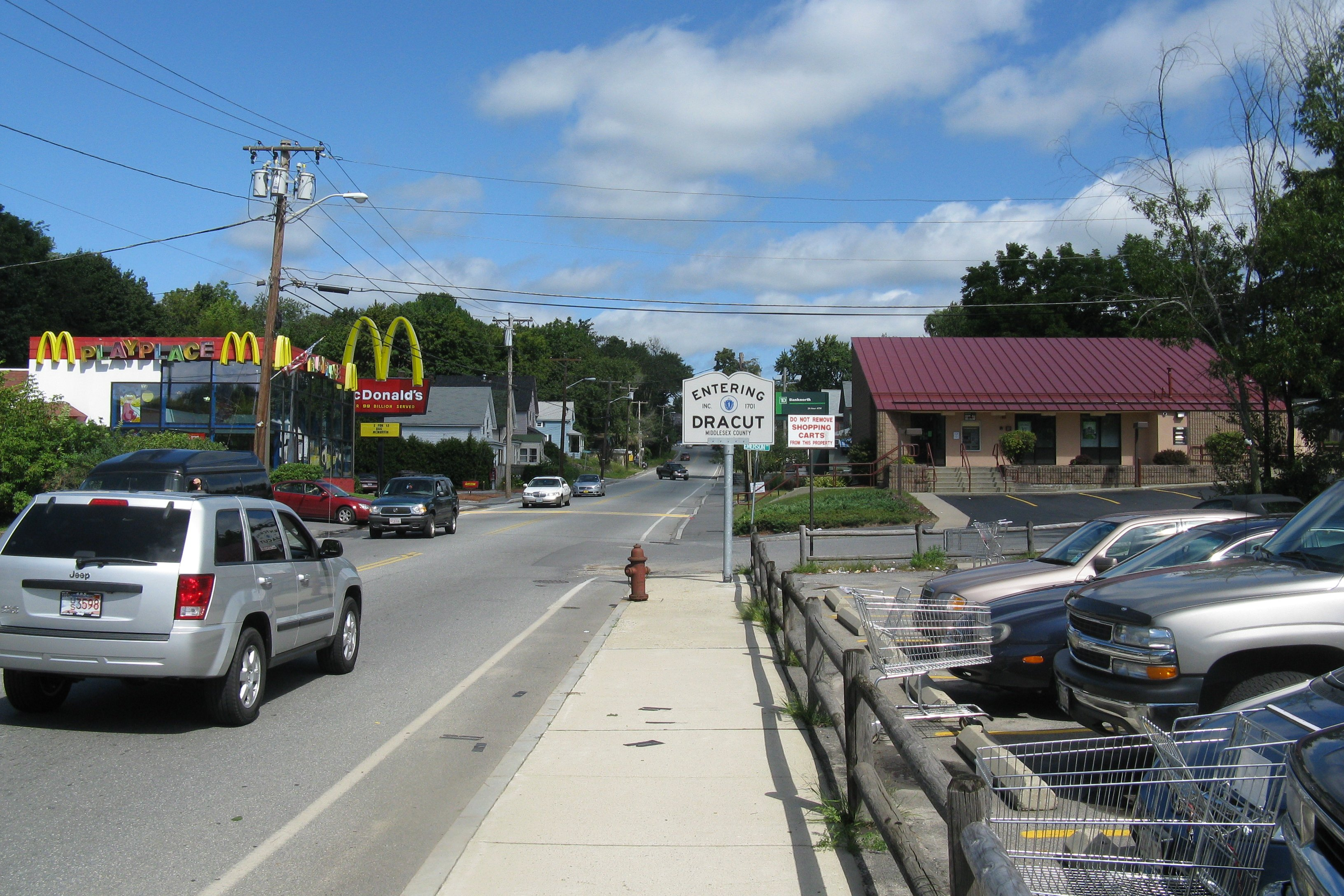
Northbound entering Dracut

The entire route is in Middlesex County.

Location	mi	km	Destinations	Notes
Somerville	0.0	0.0	Route 28 / I-93 south – Malden, Somerville, Boston	Junction of McGrath Highway & Fellsway West
Somerville	0.7	1.1	I-93 north – Lawrence, Concord, NH	Entrances from I-93 south; exit 21 on I-93
Medford	1.2	1.9	Route 16 east – Everett, Revere	Access to the Mystic Valley Parkway east
Medford	2.2	3.5	Route 16 east to I-93 – Everett, Revere	Southern terminus of Route 16 / Mystic Valley Parkway concurrency
Medford	2.5	4.0	Route 16 west	Northern terminus of Route 16 / Mystic Valley Parkway concurrency
Medford	2.7	4.3	Route 60 – Medford Square, Arlington	Rotary
Winchester			Mystic Valley Parkway	
Woburn	8.8	14.2	I-95 / Route 128 – Peabody, Portsmouth, NH, Waltham, Providence, RI	Rotary interchange; exit 53 on I-95 / Route 128
Wilmington	12.2	19.6	Route 129 east – Reading, Wakefield	Southern terminus of Route 129 concurrency
Wilmington	12.6	20.3	Route 62 – Burlington, Concord, North Reading, Beverly	
Wilmington	13.5	21.7	Route 129 west – Chelmsford, Lowell	Northern terminus of Route 129 concurrency
Tewksbury	20.4	32.8	I-495 – Lawrence, Marlboro, Taunton	Exit 92 on I-495
Lowell	22.3	35.9	Route 133 east / Route 110 west – Andover, Gloucester, Chelmsford, Worcester	Western terminus of Route 133; southern terminus of Route 110 concurrency
Lowell	22.6	36.4	Hunts Falls Bridge over the Merrimack River	
Lowell	22.7	36.5	Route 110 east – Lawrence, Salisbury	Rotary interchange; northern terminus of Route 110 concurrency
Lowell	23.8	38.3	VFW Highway west to Route 113 – UMass Lowell, Tyngsboro, Pepperell	
Dracut	24.0	38.6	Route 113 – Methuen, Haverhill, Tyngsboro	
Dracut	26.5	42.6	NH 38 north – Pelham	Continuation into New Hampshire
1.000 mi = 1.609 km; 1.000 km = 0.621 mi: Concurrency terminus; Incomplete access
