= John Botume House =

Historic house in Massachusetts, United States

- U.S. National Register of Historic Places
- U.S. Historic district – Contributing property
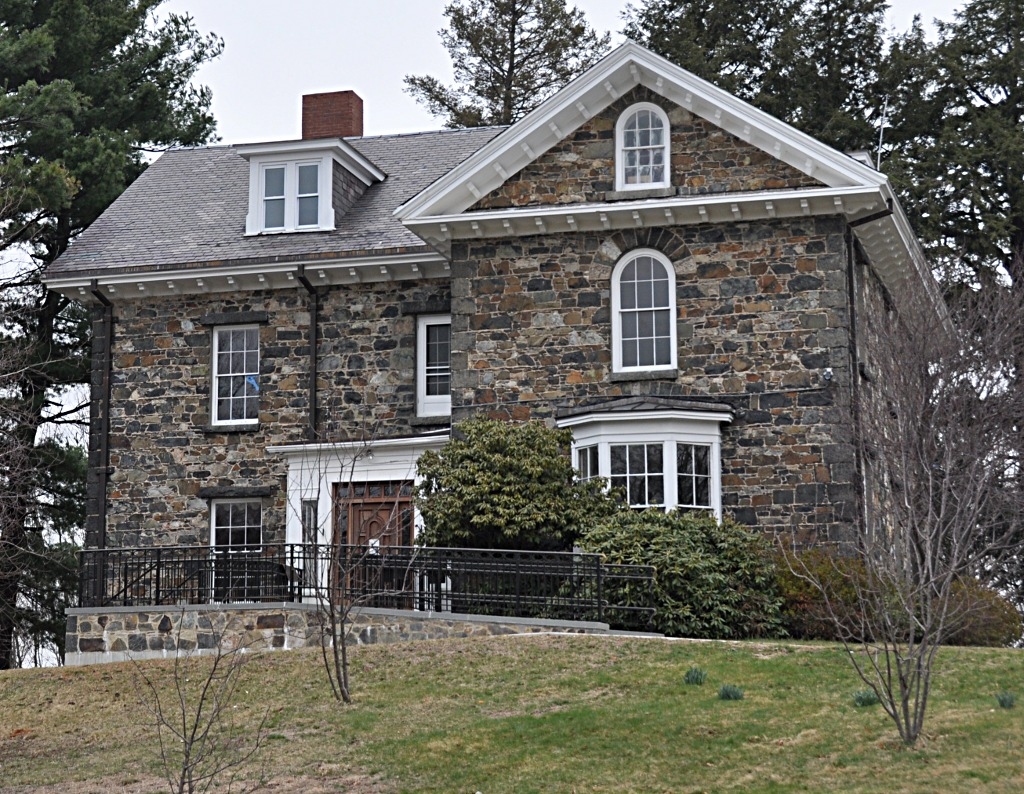

- Location within Massachusetts Location within the United States
- Location: 4 Woodland Rd., Stoneham, Massachusetts
- Coordinates: 42°27′14″N 71°5′30″W
- Area: less than one acre
- Built: 1858
- Architectural style: Italianate
- Part of: Middlesex Fells Reservoirs Historic District (ID89002249)
- MPS: Stoneham MRA
- NRHP reference No.: 84002513

Significant dates
- Added to NRHP: April 13, 1984
- Designated CP: January 18, 1990

The John Botume House is a historic house at 4 Woodland Road in Stoneham, Massachusetts. Built c. 1849, this stone house was one of several built along the shore of Spot Pond by a Boston businessman as a retreat, and is the only one to survive. It is owned by the Massachusetts Department of Conservation and Recreation, and houses the visitors center for the Middlesex Fells Reservation. It was listed on the National Register of Historic Places in 1984.

== Description and history ==
The Botume House is located in southern Stoneham, set on the eastern shore of Spot Pond, the largest body of water in the Middlesex Fells Reservation. It is a T-shaped stone structure, 2 1/2 stories in height, built out of uncoursed granite stone. Its Italianate features in a bracketed roof line and gable ends, with round-arch windows at the gable ends. Its setting also has original landscaping elements, including a pair of entrance posts and a granite wall separating it from Woodland Road.

The house was built in 1847 by William Foster, Jr., a Boston merchant, and was one of a half dozen houses built as summer houses along Spot Pond to capitalize on the setting. It is the only one to survive, the last of the rest, the Lang House, being demolished in 1986. The property was acquired in 1895 by the Metropolitan District Commission, predecessor to today's Massachusetts Department of Conservation and Recreation, which continues to own it. The MDC was using the house as a supervisor's residence at the time the property was listed on the National Register of Historic Places in 1984. It has since been converted for use as a visitors center for the Middlesex Fells Reservation.

== See also ==
- National Register of Historic Places listings in Stoneham, Massachusetts
- National Register of Historic Places listings in Middlesex County, Massachusetts
