= Mystic Valley Parkway =

Historic road in Massachusetts

- Interactive map of Mystic Valley Parkway
- Maintained by: Department of Conservation and Recreation
- Length: 6.0 mi (9.7 km)
- Location: Mystic River Reservation, Middlesex County, Massachusetts
- West end: US 3 / Route 2A in Arlington
- East end: Route 16 / Route 28 in Medford

Construction
- Completion: 1895

Other
- Designer: Olmsted Brothers
- Mystic Valley Parkway, Metropolitan Park System of Greater Boston MPS
- U.S. National Register of Historic Places
- U.S. Historic district
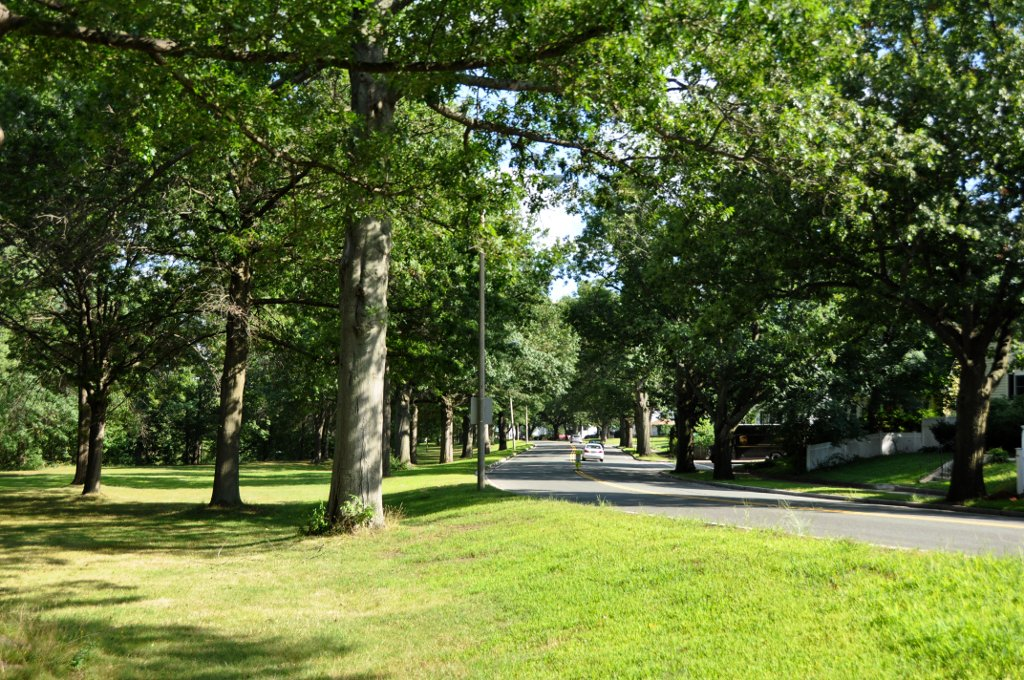

- Location within Massachusetts Location within the United States
- Location: Arlington, Medford, Somerville, and Winchester, Massachusetts
- Coordinates: 42°25′47″N 71°7′49″W
- Area: 22 acres (8.9 ha)
- Built: 1936
- Architect: Charles Eliot; Olmsted Brothers
- MPS: Metropolitan Park System of Greater Boston MPS
- NRHP reference No.: 05001529
- Added to NRHP: January 18, 2006

Mystic Valley Parkway is a parkway in Arlington, Medford, Somerville, and Winchester, Massachusetts, United States. It is listed on the National Register of Historic Places, and forms part of Route 16.

== Route description ==
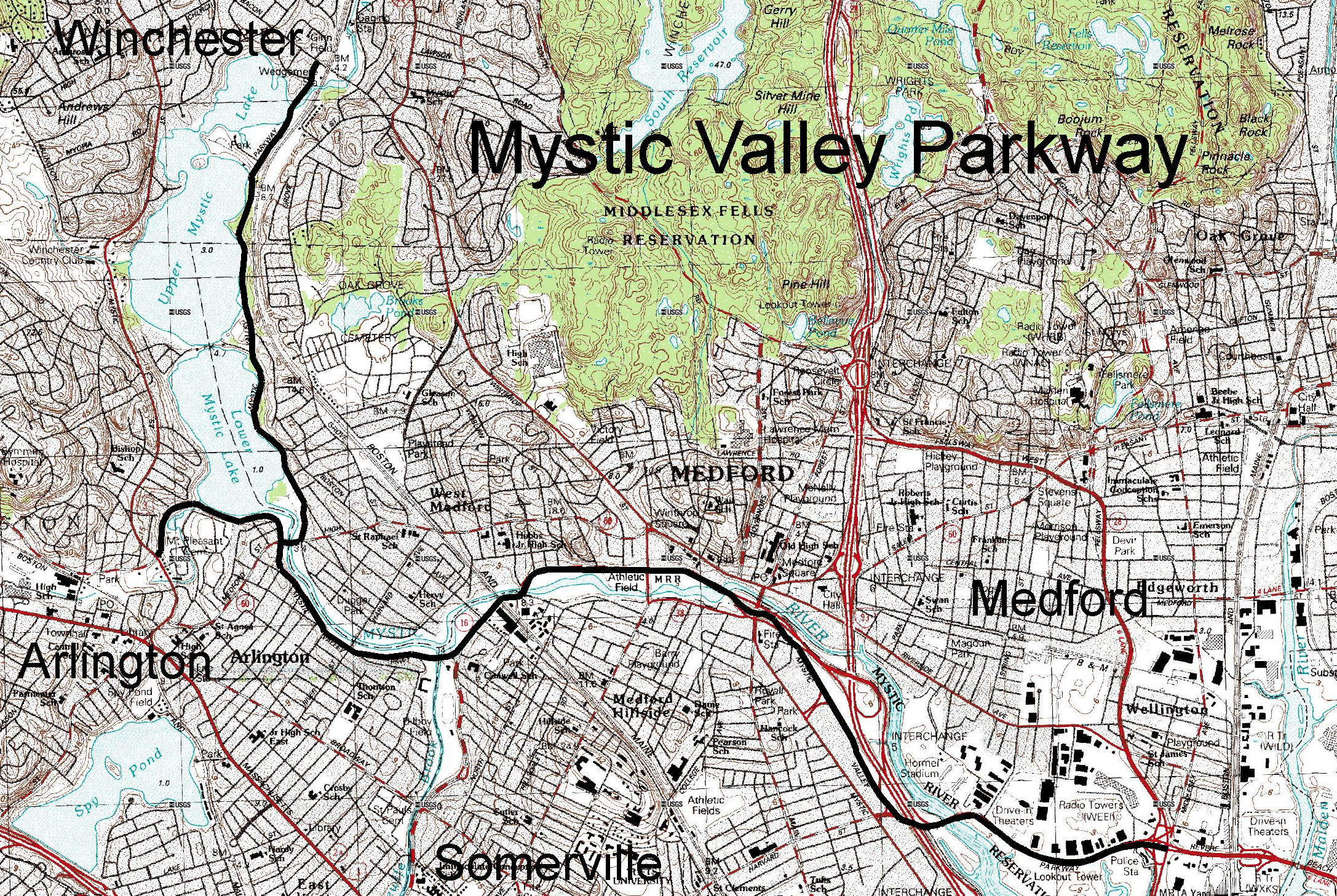
Mystic Valley Parkway, Arlington, Medford, Somerville, and Winchester

The parkway runs roughly north–south from the Middlesex Fells in Winchester, down the Aberjona River valley, and along the east side of the Mystic Lakes into Medford. This section follows the path of the old Middlesex Canal. It then crosses the Mystic River into Arlington (sharing a bridge with Massachusetts Route 60), and curves to follow the river as it runs east–west through Arlington. A short branch also runs along the southern shore of the Lower Mystic Lake from Route 60 where it ends at a junction with U.S. Route 3 and Massachusetts Route 2A. It meets Alewife Brook Parkway (and joins with Massachusetts Route 16) at a rotary near where Alewife Brook empties into the Mystic, and then continues to generally follow the course of the Mystic River downstream, crossing it several times before ending at Revere Beach Parkway where both meet Massachusetts Route 28.

== History ==
The parkway, with surrounding landscape, forms part of Boston's Metropolitan Park District, established in 1893. The parkway itself was designed in 1894–1895 by the Olmsted Brothers, the noted landscape architects, with Charles Eliot taking a lead role. It was originally created as one section of a web of pleasure roads designed for their aesthetics, as part of a comprehensive plan for green spaces in and around Boston.

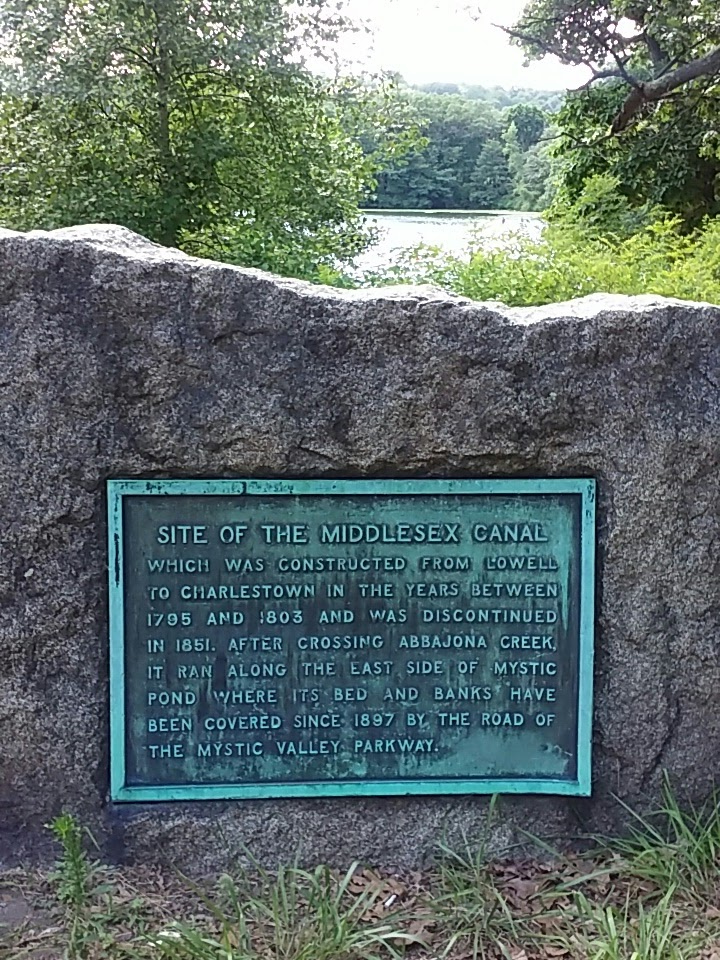
Middlesex Canal Plaque on the Mystic Valley Parkway route.

Lantern slides in the Library of Congress collection, Courtesy of the Frances Loeb Library, Graduate School of Design, Harvard University, offer views of the Parkways in published in 1895.

It now forms part of the Metropolitan Park System of Greater Boston, and on January 18, 2006, was added to the National Register of Historic Places as a historic district.

== Major intersections ==
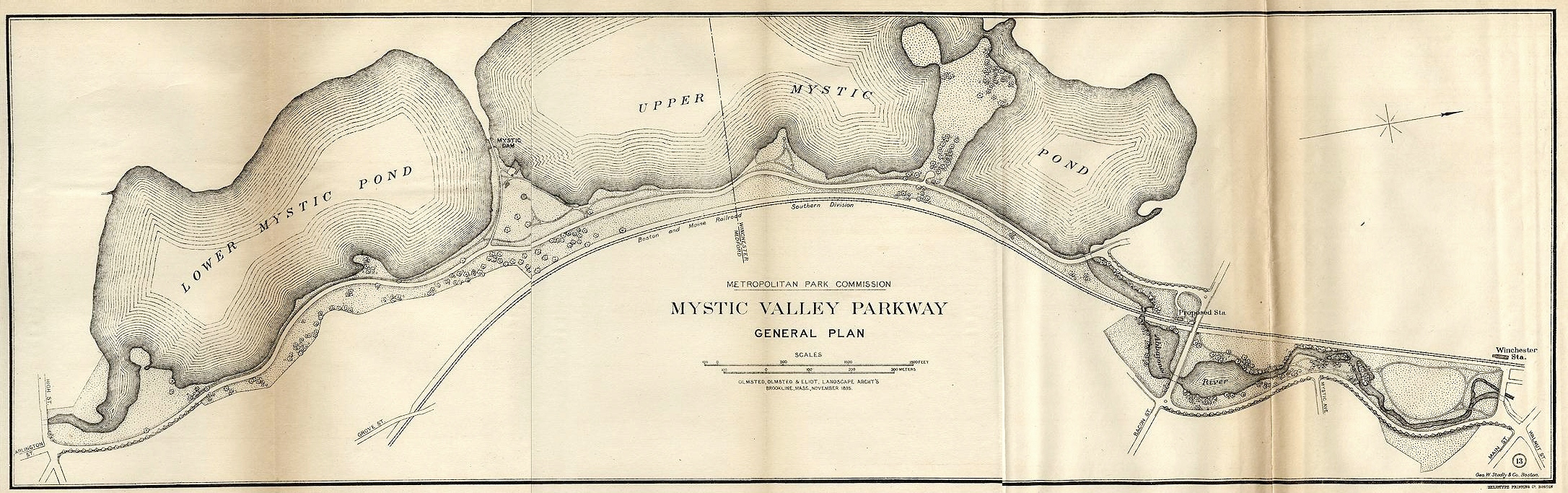
The Olmsted plan of the original parkway, 1895.

The entire route is in Middlesex County.

Location	mi	km	Destinations	Notes
Winchester	0.0	0.0	Bacon Street	
Arlington	1.9	3.1	Route 60 (High Street) to US 3 / Route 2A – Winchester	Access to US 3 / MA 2A via 0.7-mile (1.1 km) west branch of parkway
Medford	2.8	4.5	Route 16 west (Alewife Brook Parkway)	Route 16 continues south
Medford	4.1	6.6	Route 38 (Main Street) – Medford, Somerville	Interchange
Medford	4.2	6.8	I-93 – Boston, Concord, NH	Interchange; exit 22 on I-93; no direct westbound access
Medford	6.0	9.7	Route 28 (Fellsway) / Route 16 east – Charlestown, Boston, Stoneham, Reading, Everett, Revere	Route 16 continues east as Revere Beach Parkway
1.000 mi = 1.609 km; 1.000 km = 0.621 mi: Incomplete access; Route transition

== External list ==
Media related to Mystic Valley Parkway at Wikimedia Commons
