= Middlesex Fells Reservation =

Recreation area in Massachusetts, United States

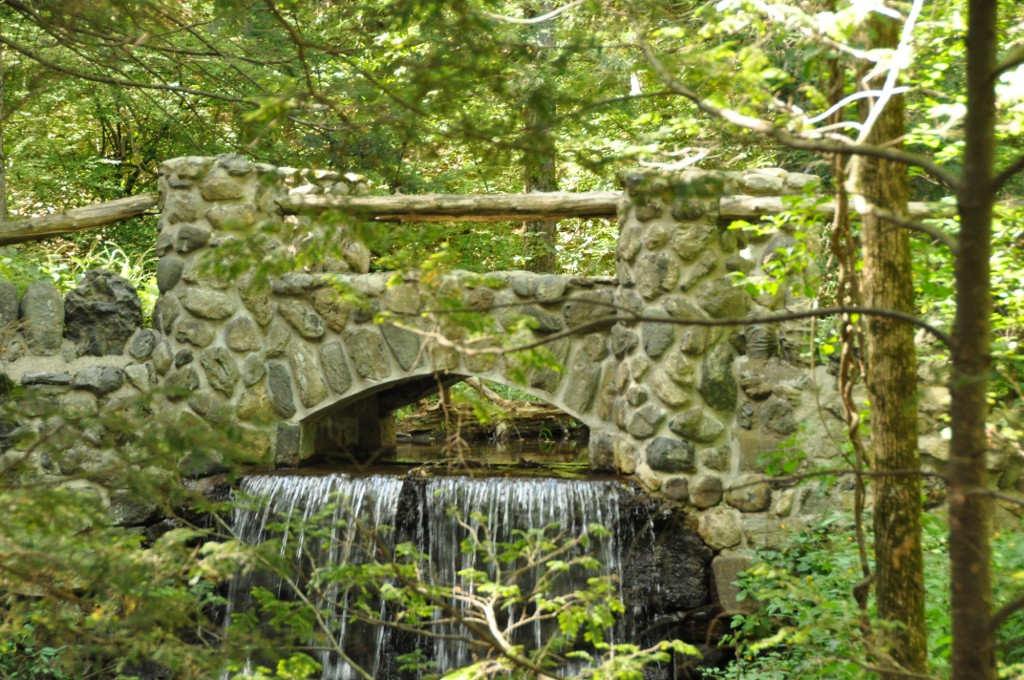
- Bridge crossing 18th-century dam on Spot Pond Brook

- Location within Massachusetts Location within the United States
- Location: Malden, Medford, Melrose, Stoneham, and Winchester, Massachusetts, United States
- Coordinates: 42°27′57″N 71°06′26″W
- Area: 2,283 acres (924 ha)
- Elevation: 302 ft (92 m)
- Established: 1893
- Administrator: Massachusetts Department of Conservation and Recreation
- Website: Official website

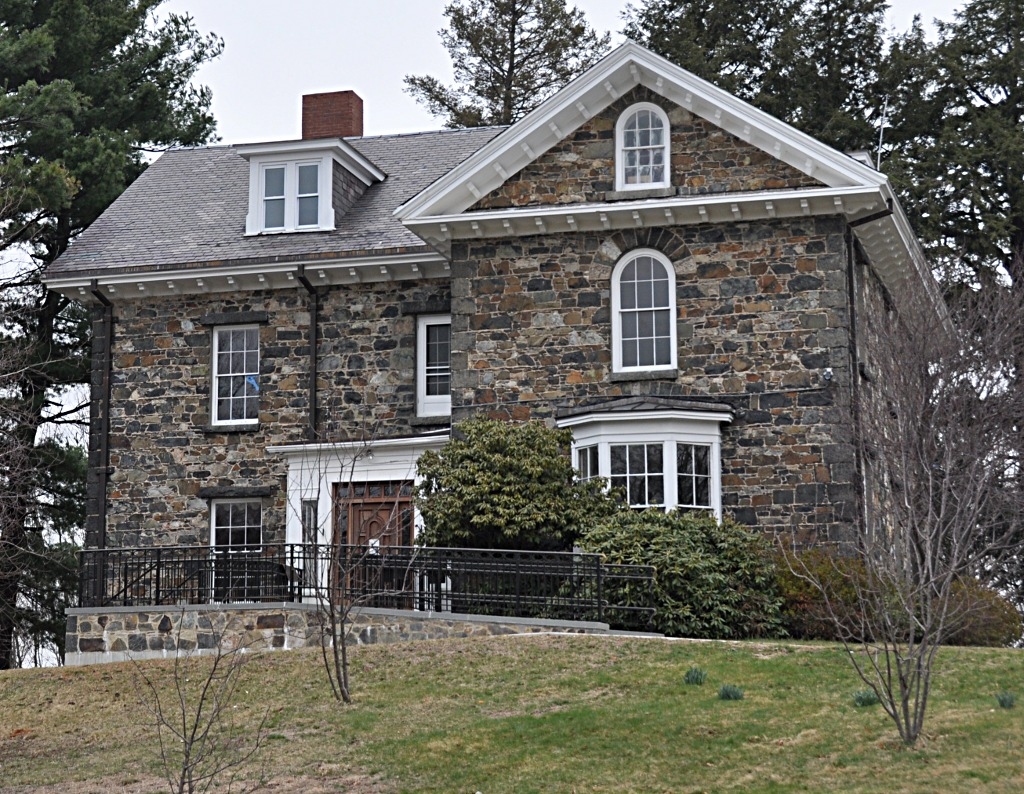
The John Botume House, which serves as the park's visitor center

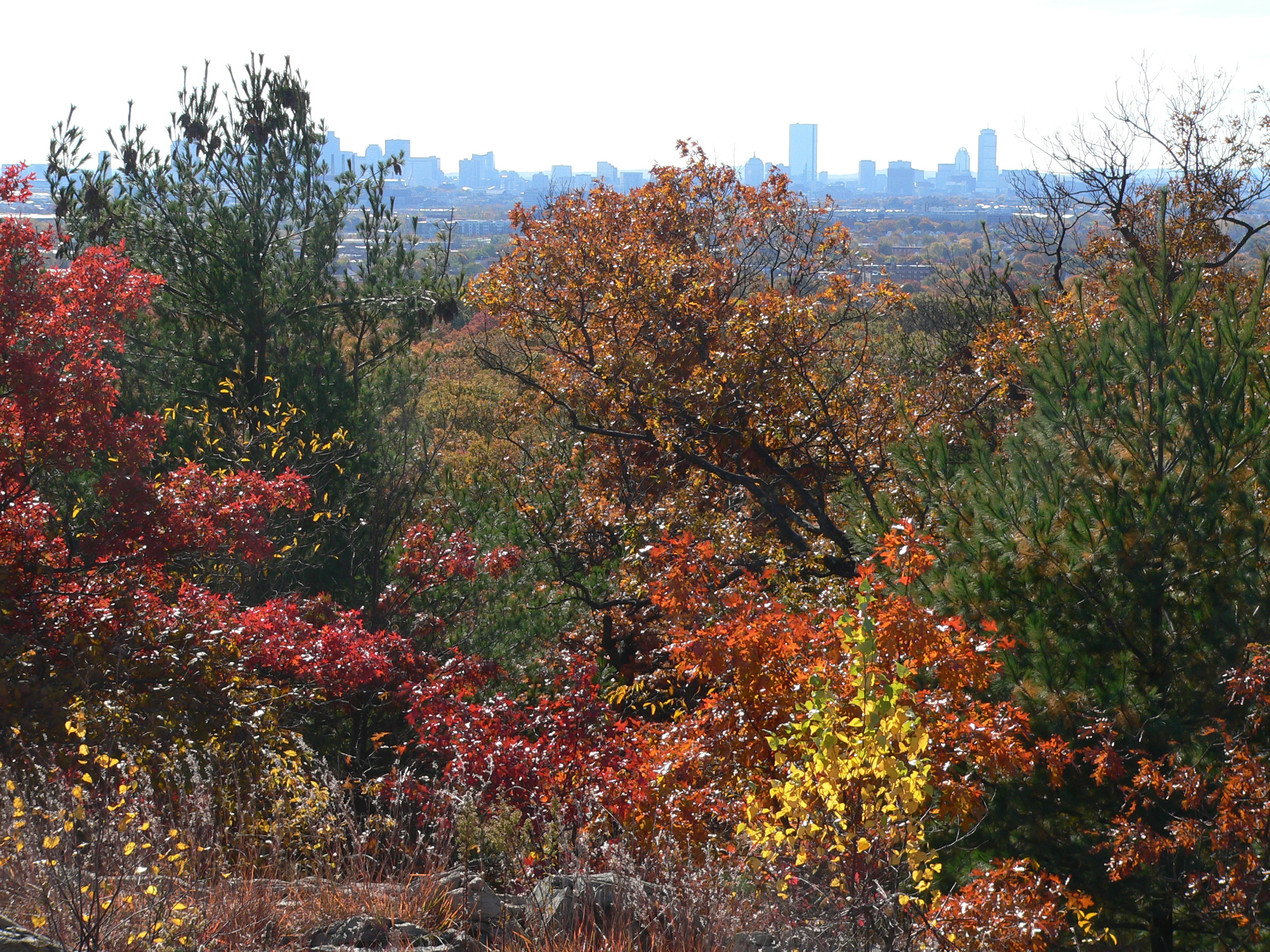
View of Boston skyline

Middlesex Fells Reservation, often referred to simply as the Fells, is a public recreation area covering more than 2,200 acres (890 ha) in Malden, Medford, Melrose, Stoneham, and Winchester, Massachusetts, United States. The state park surrounds two inactive reservoirs, Spot Pond and the Fells Reservoir, and the three active reservoirs (North, Middle, and South) that are part of the water supply system for the town of Winchester. Spot Pond and the Fells Reservoir are part of the Wachusett water system, one of six primary water systems that feed metropolitan Boston's waterworks. The park is managed by the Massachusetts Department of Conservation and Recreation and is part of the Metropolitan Park System of Greater Boston.

== History ==
The area around Middlesex Fells is known to have been explored by John Winthrop, Governor of the Massachusetts Bay Colony, in 1632. The reservation's lands have been used for the production of timber, granite, and ice. Abundant water power meant that many mills, including one that manufactured some of the first vulcanized rubber products, were located here. Remnants of early mill works are visible in the Spot Pond Archeological District, located in the Virginia Woods section, the site of the former mill village of Haywardville.

The reservation was initiated in 1891 with the donation of Virginia Wood to The Trustees of Reservations by Fannie Tudor as a memorial to her daughter, Virginia. As a child Virginia loved to walk in the woods surrounding the Italianate mansion her grandfather had given her mother on Spot Pond in 1862. The property was later donated to the Metropolitan District Commission in 1923. In 1893, the state took the property over and began managing it as a state park.

At some point in the 1800s or earlier, a stone tablet was erected on Great Island, which reads "WHERE SHUTE FELL". There are several contradictory stories explaining the significance of this phrase.

Boston Regional Medical Center was located within the Reservation along Woodland Road in Stoneham, until it closed in February 1999.

== Historic status ==
In addition to being a state park, portions of the park and structures within it are listed on the National Register of Historic Places. The entire area surrounding Spot Pond to the east of I-93 is within the Middlesex Fells Reservoirs Historic District, and the roadways in the park and on its borders are listed as the Middlesex Fells Reservation Parkways. The park's visitor center on Woodland Road in Stoneham is in the historic John Botume House, which is not far from the 1906 Metropolitan District Commission Pumping House. Historically important archaeological sites in the park are listed as part of the Spot Pond Archeological District. Roadways connecting the park to other elements of the Metropolitan Park System are also listed; these include the Fells Connector Parkways, which connect the park to the Mystic River Reservation in Winchester, and the Lynn Fells Parkway, connecting the park to the Breakheart Reservation in Saugus.

== Activities and amenities ==
The reservation has over 100 miles (160 km) of trails for hiking, mountain biking, cross-country skiing, and horseback riding. Trailheads are accessible from Interstate 93 at exits 24, 25, and 26. Fishing is offered on Dark Hollow Pond. Other facilities include picnicking areas, an observation tower, and a tot lot. A concessionaire offers sailing lessons and rentals of kayaks, canoes, pedal boats and row boats on Spot Pond during summer. Rock climbing is also popular in the Fells. Sheepfold Meadow is an open field of 10 acres (4.0 ha) located in Stoneham as a part of the reservation used by dog walkers and picnickers.
