= Massachusetts Route 60 =

East-west state highway in Massachusetts, US

Route 60
- Route 60 highlighted in red

Route information
- Maintained by MassDOT
- Length: 14.33 mi (23.06 km)

Major junctions
- West end: US 20 in Waltham
- Route 2 in Arlington; US 3 / Route 2A in Arlington; I-93 in Medford; Route 28 in Medford; US 1 in Malden
- East end: Route 1A / Route 16 in Revere

Location
- Country: United States
- State: Massachusetts
- Counties: Middlesex, Suffolk

Highway system
- Massachusetts State Highway System; Interstate; US; State
← Route 58	→ Route 62

Route 60 is a 14.33-mile-long (23.06 km) east–west state highway running through the northern suburbs of Boston. Its western terminus is at U.S. Route 20 (US 20) in Waltham and its eastern terminus is at Route 1A and Route 16 in Revere.

== Route description ==
=== Waltham to Medford ===
Route 60 begins at U.S. Route 20 in Waltham, just east of downtown. It then heads eastward, passing through the center of Belmont before intersecting in Arlington with Route 2 at that route's Exit 134 eastbound, continuing as Pleasant Street. From there, Route 60 joins U.S. Route 3 and Route 2A for a brief 0.1 miles (0.16 km) concurrency, starting at Massachusetts Avenue. It then turns eastward off of that route, crossing the Mystic River into Medford.

=== Medford to Revere ===
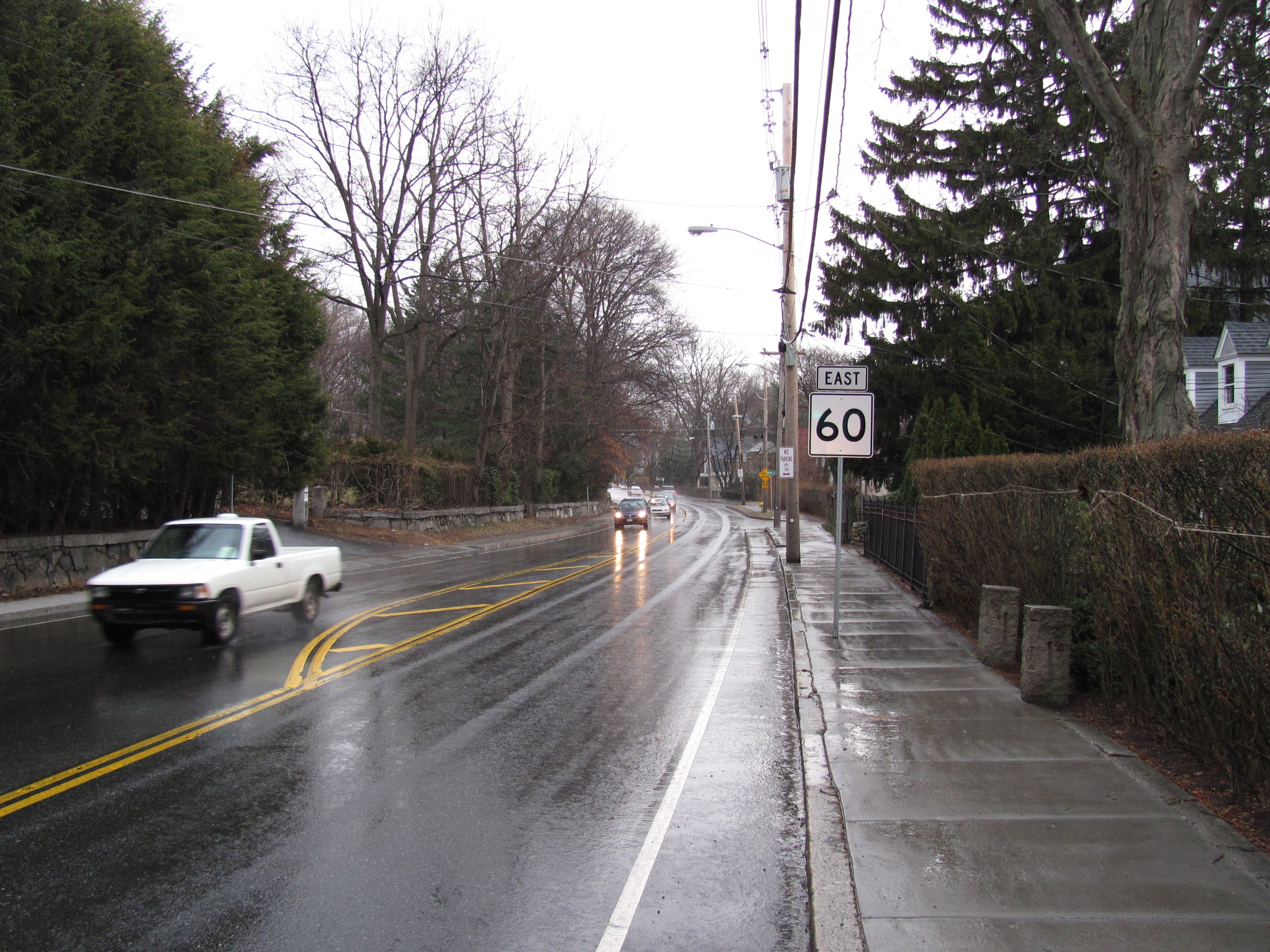
Eastbound in Belmont

In Medford it passes the West Medford commuter rail station before intersecting Route 38 at Winthrop Square. From there Route 60 heads into downtown Medford, splitting at Main Street (just north of the Mystic Valley Parkway and Route 16) before rejoining at Medford City Hall to pass under Interstate 93 at Exit 23. Route 60 continues eastward, crossing Route 28 (the Fellsway West) at Stevens Square before entering Malden. In Malden, Route 60 passes through the west end past Highland Avenue and downtown, passing the Malden Center MBTA station, which has access to both the Orange Line and the Haverhill Line. Route 60 intersects Route 99, and goes through Linden Square in the eastern part of town before entering the city of Revere.

In Revere, the route intersects U.S. Route 1 at Copeland Circle, where the Northeast Expressway was planned to continue northward to carry Interstate 95 to its current path north of Route 128. (The route was never completed due to opposition, but the ramp stubs are visible crossing the northeastern part of the circle.) From Copeland Circle, Route 60 continues eastward, south of the Rumney Marsh Reservation. It crosses Route 107 at Brown Circle, where 107 continues northward as a limited access highway towards Lynn. Route 60 then turns southward as American Legion Highway, finally ending at the intersection of Route 1A and the eastern end of Route 16, at Mahoney Circle. Route 60's right of way continues through the circle and links directly to that of Route 1A's.

The state reconstructed the section from Trapelo Road to Brighton Road in 2007. The state will reconstruct the section from Pleasant Street to the Waltham city line in 2012.

== Major intersections ==
County	Location	mi	km	Destinations	Notes
Middlesex	Waltham	0.0	0.0	US 20 to I-95 / Route 128	Western terminus
Middlesex	Arlington	3.9	6.3	Route 2 – Cambridge, Boston, Concord, Fitchburg	Exit 134 on Route 2 (Concord Turnpike); diamond interchange
Middlesex	Arlington	4.9	7.9	US 3 south / Route 2A east (Massachusetts Avenue) – Boston	Western terminus of US 3 / Route 2A concurrency
Middlesex	Arlington	5.0	8.0	US 3 north / Route 2A west – Winchester, Lexington	Eastern terminus of US 3 / Route 2A concurrency
Middlesex	Arlington			Mystic Valley Parkway	Rotary
Middlesex	Medford	6.9	11.1	Route 38 – Somerville, Winchester	Winthrop Square
Middlesex	Medford	7.7	12.4	I-93 – Boston, Concord, NH	Rotary interchange; exit 23 on I-93
Middlesex	Medford	8.6	13.8	Route 28 (Fellsway West)	
Middlesex	Medford			Fellsway East	
Middlesex	Malden	11.2	18.0	Route 99 to US 1 – Everett, Boston, Saugus	
Suffolk	Revere	12.4	20.0	US 1 – Boston, Newburyport	Rotary interchange with Northeast Expressway
Suffolk	Revere	13.4	21.6	Route 107 – Revere, Chelsea, Lynn, Salem	Rotary
Suffolk	Revere	14.33	23.06	Route 1A / Route 16 west – Chelsea, Boston, Logan Airport, Revere Beach, Lynn	Eastern terminus; Mahoney Circle; rotary; eastern terminus of Route 16 (Revere Beach Parkway)
1.000 mi = 1.609 km; 1.000 km = 0.621 mi: Concurrency terminus
