= Metropolitan District Commission Pumping House =

Historic building in Stoneham, Massachusetts

- U.S. National Register of Historic Places
- U.S. Historic district – Contributing property
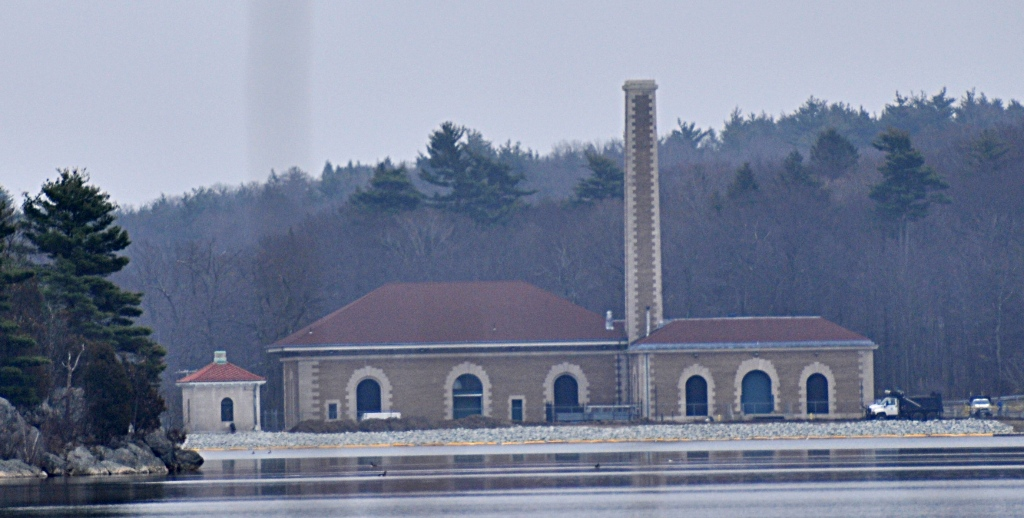

- Location within Massachusetts Location within the United States
- Location: Woodland Rd., Stoneham, Massachusetts
- Coordinates: 42°27′21″N 71°5′27″W
- Area: less than one acre
- Built: 1906
- Architect: Shepley, Rutan, & Coolidge
- Architectural style: Renaissance Revival
- Part of: Middlesex Fells Reservoirs Historic District (ID89002249)
- MPS: Stoneham MRA
- NRHP reference No.: 84002747

Significant dates
- Added to NRHP: April 13, 1984
- Designated CP: January 18, 1990

The Metropolitan District Commission Pumping House is a historic water pumping station, adjacent to Spot Pond in the Middlesex Fells Reservation, on Woodland Road in Stoneham, Massachusetts. Built in 1901 by the Metropolitan District Commission (MDC), it is one of Stoneham's finest examples of Renaissance Revival architecture. The building (along with an adjacent gatehouse) was listed on the National Register of Historic Places in 1984, and included in the Middlesex Fells Reservoirs Historic District in 1990.

== Description and history ==
Spot Pond was designated as the public water supply for Melrose, Malden, and Medford in 1870, with a dam at its southern end enlarging a natural body of water. In the 1890s it was made a centerpiece of the Middlesex Fells Reservation, and about 1900 its water supply function was taken over by the MDC. This Romanesque Revival building was designed by Shepley, Rutan and Coolidge and completed in 1901, as part of a general expansion of water service in the area, and was placed on the former summer estate of Charles Copeland. It is built of yellow brick with limestone trim. It has quoined corners, and features rusticated arched windows. It was extended with a side ell in 1923. In 1975 the building was extensively damaged by fire. Its tile roof and clerestory were lost, replaced by the present asphalt shingle hip roof.

When built, the building housed three steam-powered engines capable of pumping 90 million gallons per day; one of these machines was moved here from the Mystic Pumping Station in Somerville. These engines were replaced between the late 1920s and 1950s with large diesel engines. Spot Pond has been relegated to emergency service by the Massachusetts Water Resources Authority, successor to the MDC. The pumping station now delivers water to area communities from a covered tank elsewhere in the reservation.

== See also ==
- National Register of Historic Places listings in Stoneham, Massachusetts
- National Register of Historic Places listings in Middlesex County, Massachusetts
