= Massachusetts Route 99 =

North-south state highway in Massachusetts, US

Route 99
- Route 99 highlighted in red

Route information
- Maintained by MassDOT
- Length: 6.67 mi (10.73 km)

Major junctions
- South end: North Washington Street and Chelsea Street in Boston
- US 1 in Boston; Route 16 in Everett; Route 60 in Malden
- North end: US 1 in Saugus

Location
- Country: United States
- State: Massachusetts
- Counties: Suffolk, Middlesex, Essex

Highway system
- Massachusetts State Highway System; Interstate; US; State
← Route 98	→ Route 101

Route 99 is a 6.67-mile-long (10.73 km) north–south state highway in metropolitan Boston, leading from the Boston neighborhood of Charlestown through the northern suburbs of Everett, Malden, and Melrose, and terminating in Saugus at U.S. Route 1 (US 1).

== Route description ==
Route 99 begins where North Washington Street becomes New Rutherford Avenue on the north side of the Bill Russell Bridge. This occurs at the intersection with Chelsea Street, situated above the northbound tunnel of U.S. Route 1. Route 99 travels as a limited access highway through Charlestown along New Rutherford Avenue, intersecting with ramps for U.S. Route 1 and passing under the Gilmore Bridge that connects Charlestown to Cambridge. New Rutherford Avenue becomes Rutherford Avenue and the route continues along it, until the route splits off into an underpass below Sullivan Square, where it turns northeastward. The route emerges to join Alford Street and crosses the Alford Street Bridge over the Mystic River. After passing through a small strip of Charlestown on the east banks of the river, the route enters Everett, loses its expressway features and limited-access status, and becomes Broadway.

From Everett, the route crosses through Sweetser Circle (the intersection with Route 16 and Revere Beach Parkway) and continues northeastward into the city of Malden, where it intersects Route 60. The route continues on through a short (0.25 miles (0.40 km)) corner of Melrose before entering Saugus. Once in Saugus the route terminates at ramps leading to U.S. Route 1.

== History ==
Prior to 1971, the portion north of the interchange with the Revere Beach Parkway (current Route 16, previously US Route 1 & MA Route 1A) was originally part of U.S. Route 1. The stretch south of the interchange to the Charlestown Bridge originally had no known route number assigned to it.

When it became designated as Route 99 circa 1971, its southern terminus was on the Charlestown Bridge, but this was moved to its present location following the Big Dig.

The Sweetser Circle has been the site of numerous major accidents, including a gas tanker rollover early on December 5, 2007 that resulted in 9,400 U.S. gallons (36 kL) spilling, igniting and destroying 21 vehicles and two large multi-family homes.

== Major intersections ==
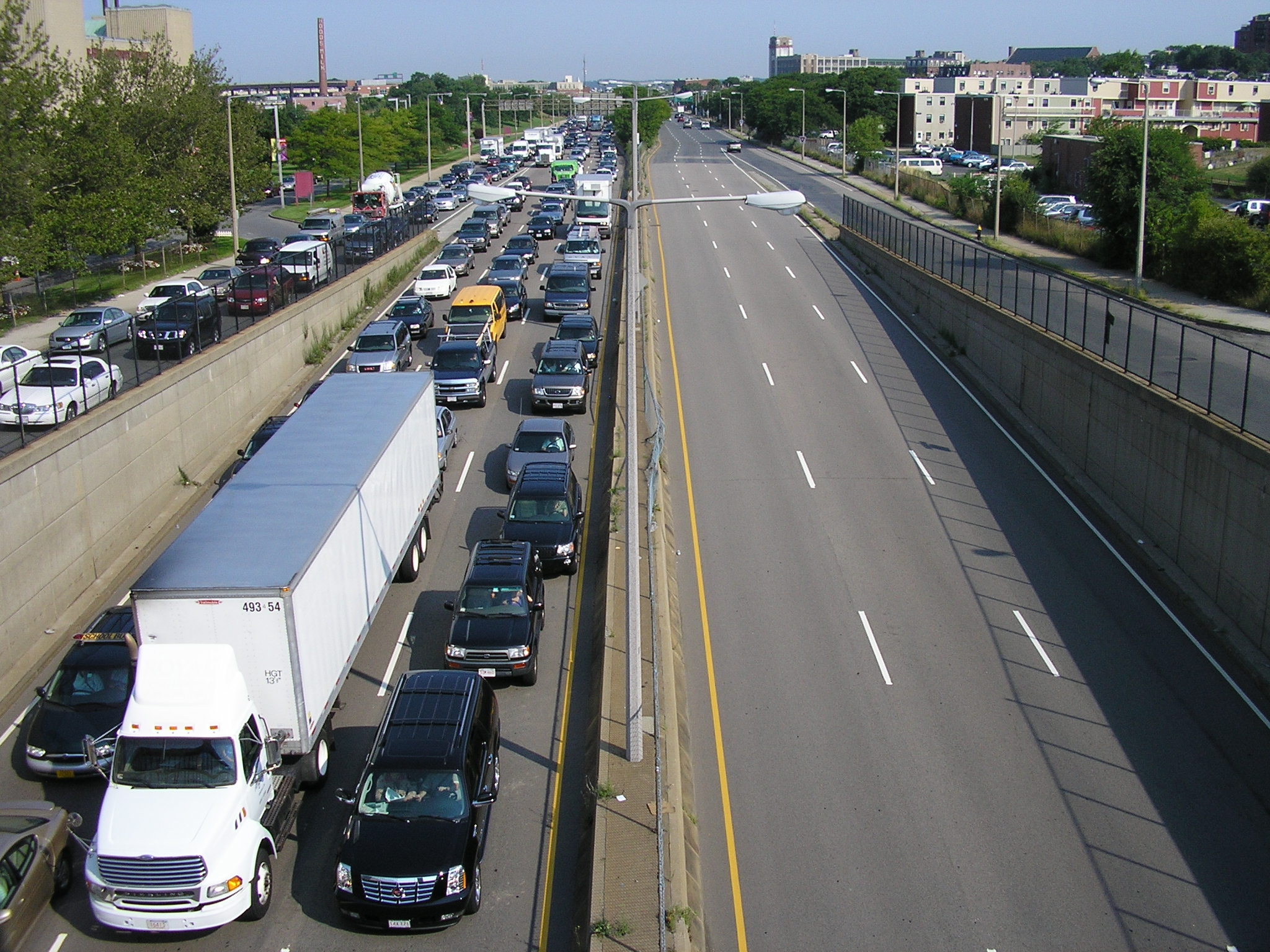
Route 99, as observed from the Bunker Hill Community College skywalk in Charlestown.

County	Location	mi	km	Destinations	Notes
Suffolk	Boston	0.0	0.0	I-93 south / North Washington Street / Chelsea Street – Storrow Drive, North Station, Government Center, City Square	Southern terminus
Suffolk	Boston	0.2	0.32	US 1 north – Tobin Bridge	From southbound / to northbound U.S. Route 1
Middlesex	Everett	2.5	4.0	Route 16 to US 1 – Medford, Somerville, Chelsea; Main Street – Malden, Melrose	Sweetser Circle: Access to Revere Beach Parkway
Middlesex	Malden	4.8	7.7	Route 60 – Malden, Medford, Revere, Lynn	
Essex	Saugus	6.7	10.8	US 1 – Peabody, Newburyport, Boston	Northern terminus
1.000 mi = 1.609 km; 1.000 km = 0.621 mi: Incomplete access
