= Middlesex Fells Reservoirs Historic District =

Historic district in Massachusetts, United States

- U.S. National Register of Historic Places
- U.S. Historic district
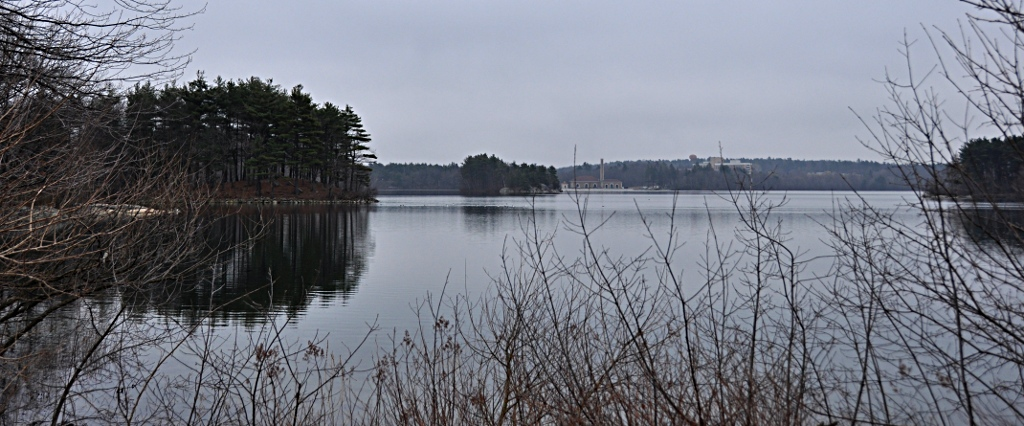
- Spot Pond

- Location within Massachusetts Location within the United States
- Location: Medford, Massachusetts
- Coordinates: 42°27′18″N 71°5′43″W
- Built: 1870
- Architect: Shepley, Rutan & Coolidge; Et al.
- Architectural style: Italianate
- MPS: Water Supply System of Metropolitan Boston MPS
- NRHP reference No.: 89002249
- Added to NRHP: January 18, 1990

The Middlesex Fells Reservoirs Historic District is a historic district roughly bounded by Pond St., Woodland Rd., I-93, and MA 28 in Stoneham and Medford, Massachusetts. It encompasses a portion of the Middlesex Fells Reservation, a state park managed by the Massachusetts Department of Conservation and Recreation (DCR). The principal features of the district are three reservoirs and their associated gate houses and pumping stations, which were developed by the Metropolitan District Commission (MDC, predecessor organization to the DCR) starting in the late 19th century. The district was listed on the National Register of Historic Places in 1990.

The most prominent and visible feature of the district is Spot Pond, a large body of water on the east side of Interstate 93 in Stoneham. The pond was used as a passive reservoir by surrounding towns prior to its acquisition by the MDC. The MDC replaced several town pumping stations with a single station (separately listed on the National Register in 1984), and constructed a gate house adjacent. Also found in the same area on the eastern shore of the pond is the John Bottume House, a 19th-century stone house that now serves as the reservation's visitors center. The MDC also enlarged the pond's capacity, and converted it for use as a storage reservoir providing water to the communities north of Boston. There is a second gatehouse on Spot Pond, at the southern end (straddling the Stoneham-Medford line).

The MDC also constructed two smaller reservoirs within the Fells. The Bear Hill Reservoir, located just west of I-93 near the summit of Bear Hill, has a capacity of 2 million gallons, and was created in 1902-3 with the construction of two concrete dams and a gatehouse. The Fells Reservoir is located in the southeastern part of the reservation. Because it was sited in existing parkland, it was given a deliberately naturalistic appearance. It was designed by the noted Olmsted Brothers firm, and its gatehouse was built to a design by Shepley, Rutan, and Coolidge.

== See also ==
- National Register of Historic Places listings in Stoneham, Massachusetts
- National Register of Historic Places listings in Medford, Massachusetts
- National Register of Historic Places listings in Middlesex County, Massachusetts
