= Breakheart Reservation =

State park

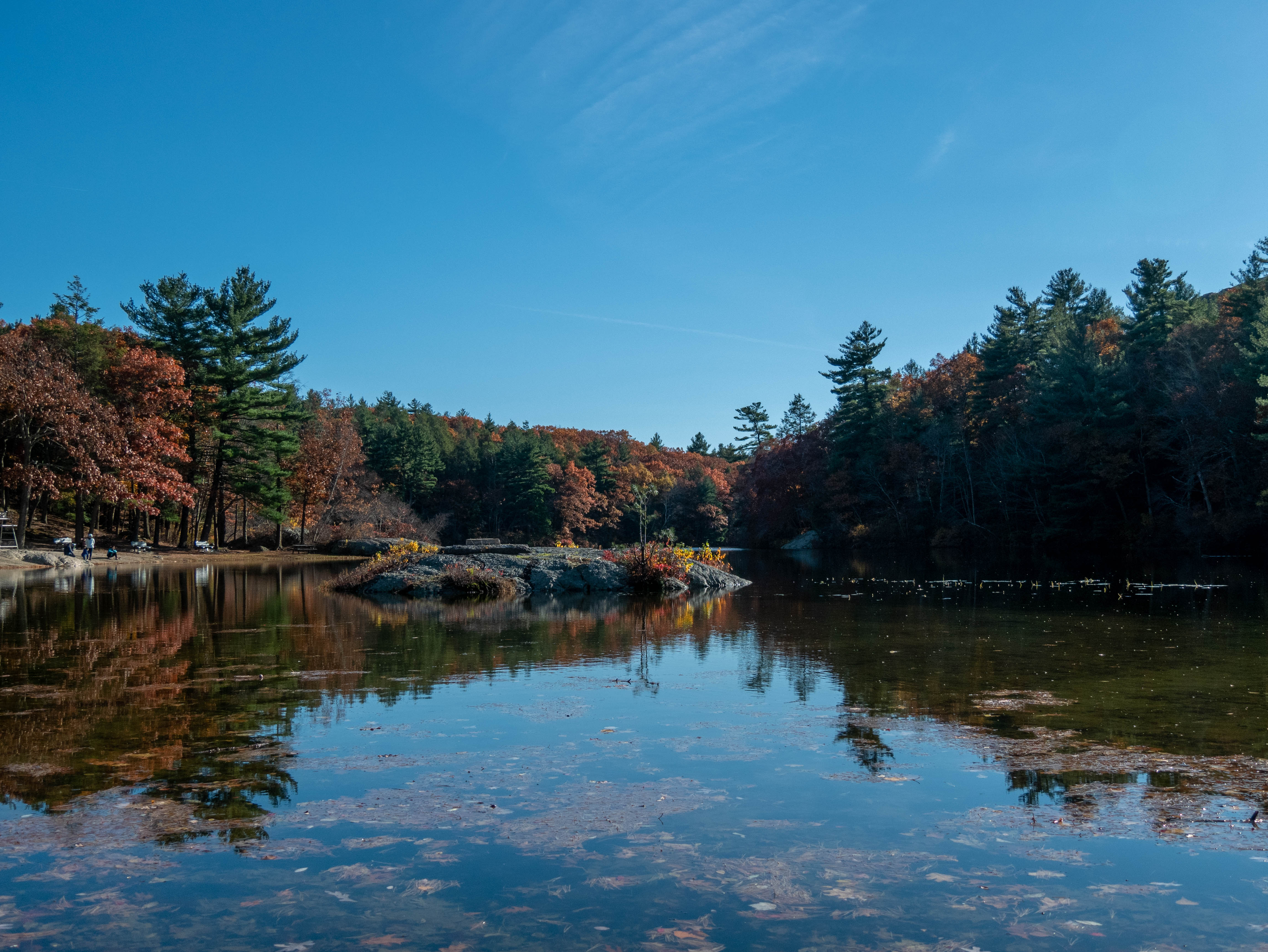
- Breakheart's Pearce Lake

- Location within Massachusetts Location within the United States
- Location: Saugus and Wakefield, Massachusetts, United States
- Coordinates: 42°29′18″N 71°02′14″W
- Area: 652 acres (264 ha)
- Elevation: 85 ft (26 m)
- Established: 1934
- Administrator: Massachusetts Department of Conservation and Recreation
- Website: Official website
- Breakheart Reservation Parkways
- U.S. National Register of Historic Places
- U.S. Historic district
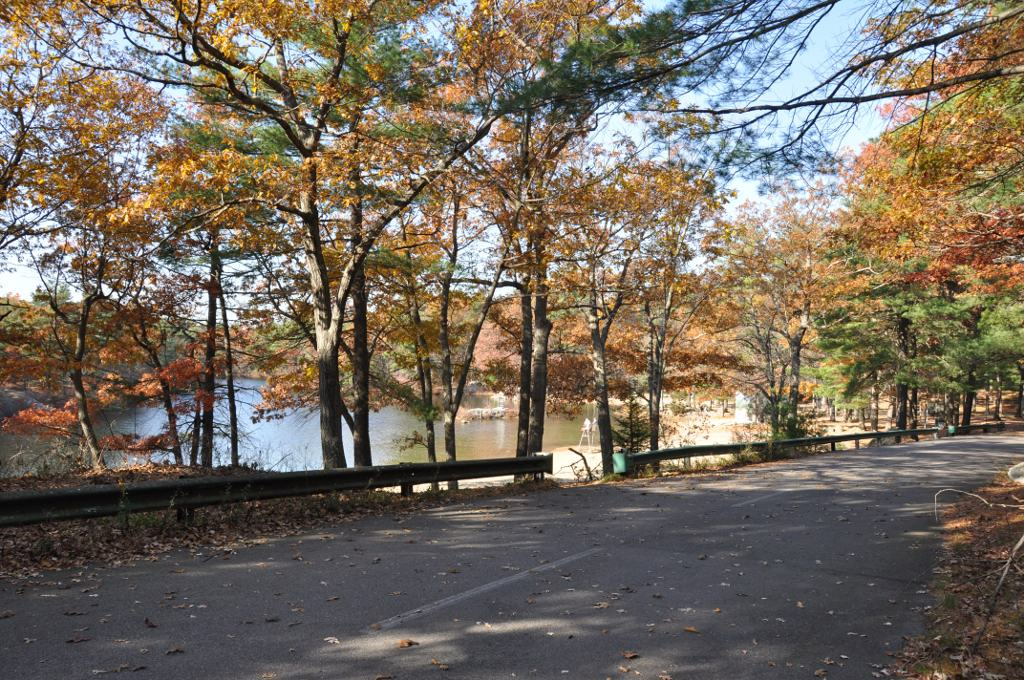
- Location: Saugus and Wakefield, Massachusetts
- Built: 1934
- Architect: Charles Eliot
- MPS: Metropolitan Park System of Greater Boston MPS
- NRHP reference No.: 03000748
- Added to NRHP: August 11, 2003

Breakheart Reservation is a public recreation area covering 652 acres (264 ha) in the towns of Saugus and Wakefield, Massachusetts. The reservation features a hardwood forest, two freshwater lakes, a winding stretch of the Saugus River, and scenic views of Boston and rural New England from rocky hilltops. The park is managed by the Massachusetts Department of Conservation and Recreation.

== History ==
Native Americans

Archaeological evidence shows that hunting, camping, and fishing took place along the Saugus River as far back as the Paleo-Indians and continuing through the Archaic and Woodland periods.

Colonial period

In 1666, John Gifford, the second general agent of the Saugus Iron Works, who had left the company over a dispute with its creditors, purchased 260 acres along the Saugus River from Thomas Breedon of Boston for £260. He established his own iron works on the site, which closed in 1675 due to the economic downturn caused by King Philip's War. Gifford's site later housed a sawmill (1703–1740), wire-manufacturing operation (1814–1828), a snuff-grinding mill (1837–1871), and a second sawmill (1871–1902).

The Six-Hundred Acres

In 1706, the land (known as the Six-Hundred Acres) was divided among the male settlers. During the 18th and 19th centuries, the land remained largely unchanged. Most of the land was passed down through the same families. Most landowners resided off of the property and used the land for firewood, if at all.

In 1814, a fieldstone milldam was constructed downstream from the Gifford site to provide power for the Linen and Duck Manufactory Company of Boston. The mill closed after the War of 1812 due to a decline in the demand for sailcloth; however, the dam still exists.

Breakheart Hill Forest

In 1891, Benjamin Newhall Johnson, Micajah Clough, and John Bartlett of Lynn began purchasing land in the Six-Hundred Acres for use as a hunting retreat. They created Upper Pond (today's Silver Lake) and Lower Pond (today's Pearce Lake), stocked them with fish, and named their property Breakheart Hill Forest. Johnson purchased a log cabin in Maine, numbered all of its parts, and brought it down to Breakheart Hill, where it was rebuilt on the shore of Lower Pond. On June 12, 1891 the retreat was officially opened. In the early 1900s, the partners increased the size of the property.

Breakheart Hill Farm

The Six-Hundred Acres was also home to Breakheart Hill Farm, an 18-acre farm. It was first owned by the Hitchings family, who sold it to Thomas Houghton for $375 in 1830. Four years later, it was sold to Artemas Edmands for $400. In 1892, Edmands' grandson sold it to the Breakheart Hill Forestry, run by Johnson and his associates, for $1.

After purchasing the land, Johnson hired George Parrott to farm the land and keep out trespassers. In 1897, Parrott was succeeded by George E. Bailey. In May 1900, Bailey hired John C. Best to assist him on the property. On October 8, 1900, after a dispute, Best shot and killed Bailey. He then dismembered Bailey's body, placed the pieces in burlap bags, drove Bailey's carriage down to Floating Bridge Pond in Lynn, and dumped the bags in the pond. After a sensational trial, Best was found guilty and executed in the electric chair at Charlestown State Prison.

Bailey was succeeded as caretaker of Breakheart Hill by Henry Cole. On April 12, 1901, Cole left home and was never seen again. He and his wife had an argument before he left and she believed that he had not returned because he had tired of his family situation.

After Cole's disappearance, George Parker took over as caretaker and remained on the farm until his death in 1923.

State ownership

In 1934, the executors for Johnson and Clough sold the Breakheart Hill Forest to the Metropolitan District Commission for $40,000. The MDC then turned the land over to the Civilian Conservation Corps. Over the course of six years, the CCC built roads and trails, planted trees, and restored the dams at Upper Pond and Lower Pond. The CCC's efforts resulted in the return of wildlife that had become rare in Breakheart, including beavers, fishers, coyotes, blue herons, and owls. Breakheart was opened to the public in 1936.

== Activities and amenities ==
- Visitor center: The park is headquartered at the Christopher P. Dunne Visitor Center which opened in 2004. In addition to restrooms, educational programs and information, the center has displays and exhibits that introduce aspects of the forest's wildlife and human history.
- Swimming: The beach at the north end of Pearce Lake also has a first aid station during the summer months.
- Trails: Trails are available for hiking, mountain biking, and cross-country skiing.
- The park also offers fishing, orienteering, a tot lot, and a play area for dogs and their owners, Bark Place.

== Breakheart Parkways ==
On August 11, 2003, the Breakheart Reservation Parkways (officially registered as Breakheart Reservation Parkways-Metropolitan Park System of Greater Boston) were added to the National Register of Historic Places. The parkways consist of Forest Street, Pine Tops Road, Elm Road, and Hemlock Road. The parkways are under the jurisdiction of the Department of Conservation and Recreation, which also controls Lynn Fells Parkway in Melrose and Saugus. In December 2002, the Massachusetts Historical Commission voted to nominate both the Lynn Fells Parkway and the Breakheart Reservation Parkways to the Keeper of the National Register, but only the Breakheart Reservation Parkways were added to the Register that year. (The Lynn Fells Parkway was separately added to the national register in 2003.) The system was designed by Charles Eliot.

== See also ==
- Metropolitan Park System of Greater Boston
- List of Massachusetts state parks
- National Register of Historic Places listings in Essex County, Massachusetts
- National Register of Historic Places listings in Wakefield, Massachusetts
