= Department of Conservation and Recreation =

State agency of the Commonwealth of Massachusetts

- Massachusetts Department of Conservation and Recreation

- Agency logo

Department overview
- Formed: 2003
- Preceding agencies: Metropolitan District Commission; Department of Environmental Management
- Jurisdiction: Massachusetts, United States
- Headquarters: State Transportation Building, 10 Park Plaza, Suite 6620, Boston, MA 02116
- Department executive: Nicole LaChapelle, Commissioner
- Website: Official website

The Department of Conservation and Recreation (DCR) is an agency of the Commonwealth of Massachusetts, United States, situated in the Executive Office of Energy and Environmental Affairs. It is best known for its parks and parkways. The DCR's mission is "To protect, promote and enhance our common wealth of natural, cultural and recreational resources for the well-being of all." The agency is the largest landowner in Massachusetts. The DCR owns and maintains multiple highways inherited from its predecessor agency, which had ripped out parkland to install them. Today, those highways are among the state's most dangerous roads.

== History and structure ==
Former seal and logotypes of Mass DEM and the Metropolitan District Commission (MDC) which merged into DCR

The Department of Conservation and Recreation was formed in 2003 under Governor Mitt Romney, when the former Metropolitan District Commission (MDC) and Department of Environmental Management (DEM) were merged to form the DCR. The DCR is under the general management of the Commissioner of the DCR. The general administration divisions; Human Resources Division, the Financial Division, and External and Legislative Affairs, report directly to the Commissioner. DCR is responsible for the stewardship of its lands, from general maintenance—such as emptying trash barrels, cutting grass, and making building improvements—to landscape-level management.

DCR also provides services beyond its boundaries, for example, Bureau of Forest Fire Control is available to aid and assist local cities and towns during natural disasters as well as periods of high fire danger, while its Bureau of Forestry administers forest management on both state and private lands. It also manages its land through the help of partners, including road repairs occasionally implemented by the Massachusetts Department of Transportation at the request of DCR. Police protection has been provided by the Massachusetts Environmental Police and the Massachusetts State Police after the MDC's police department was merged into the State Police in 1992. The DCR also maintains its own Bureau of Ranger Services which provides for public safety, search & rescue, and enforces violations on DCR owned and managed property. In addition to partnering with state agencies, DCR coordinates with local and national volunteer organizations, such as the Mystic River Watershed Association, Friends of the Middlesex Fells, Appalachian Mountain Club, and local student organizations.

=== Division of State Parks ===
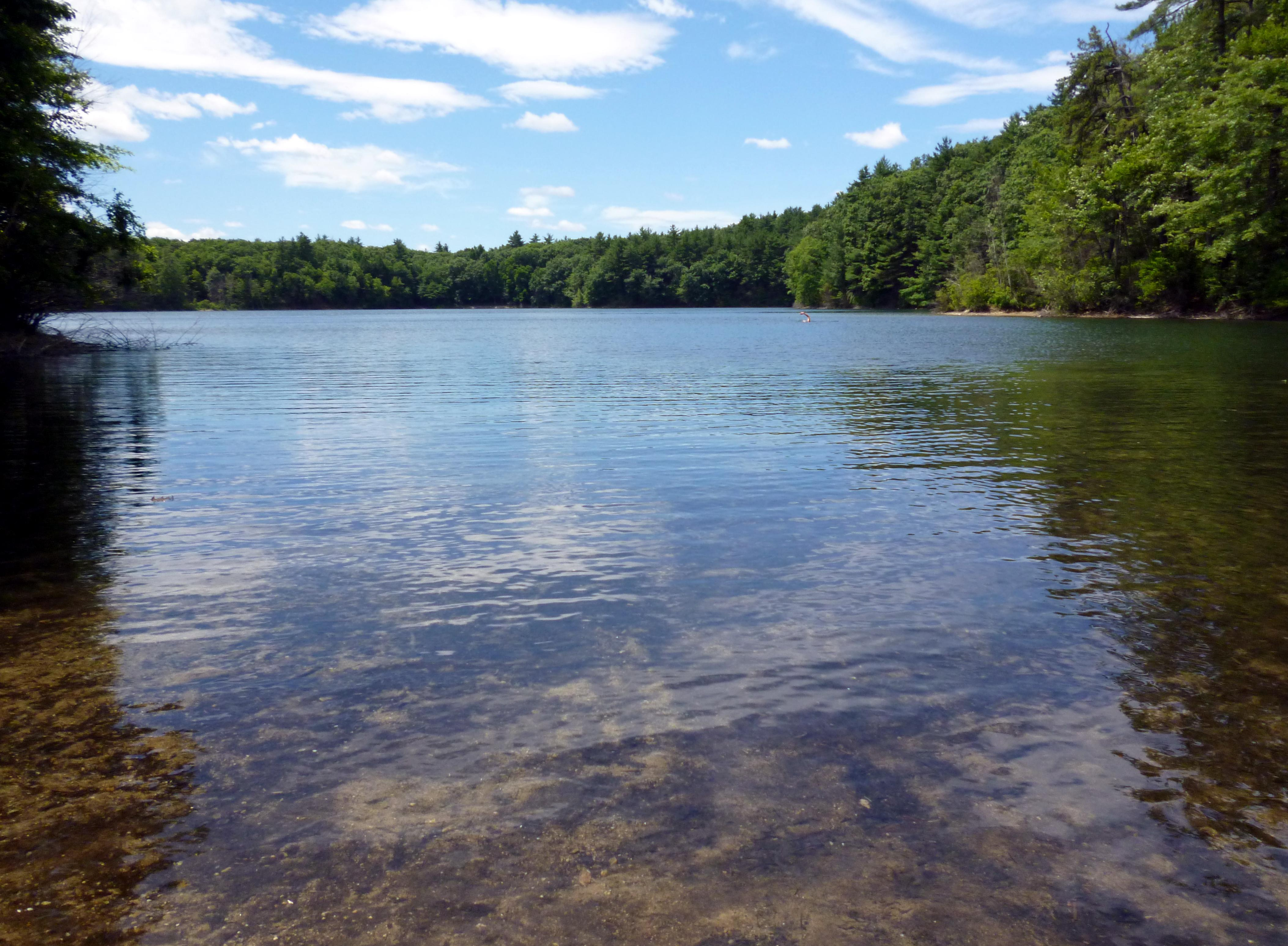
Walden Pond State Reservation in Concord

The Division of State Parks is responsible for the maintenance and management of over 310,000 acres (1,250 km^{2}) of state-owned forests and parks. These areas are designated as either Woodlands, Parklands, or Reserves, and are managed to maintain specific land-use characteristics. From the agency's beginning in 2003 until 2012, DCR land management was organized into three divisions: State Parks and Recreation, Urban Parks and Recreation, and Water Supply Protection. In 2012, State Parks and Urban Parks were unified into one division.

As of 2009, within the greater Boston area there are urban wilds, historic sites, and other naturally aesthetic or significant environmental properties. The origins of the collective environments in this part of the division date back to the creation of the Metropolitan Park Commission in 1893, forming the first such regional system in the United States. (see Metropolitan Park System of Greater Boston for history). Lands outside of the greater Boston area includes some 29 campgrounds, over 2,000 miles (3,200 km) of trails, 87 beaches, 37 swimming, wading, and spray pools, 62 playgrounds, 55 ballfields, 145 miles (233 km) of paved bike and rail trails and once private homes and estates that are now a part of the DCR's Historic Curatorship Program.

The DCR's predecessor agency ripped out parks to install highways, often branded as parkways, and today the DCR's highways are among the state's most dangerous stretches of road, and contribute to pollution due to motor vehicle congestion. The highways under DCR's jurisdiction include Memorial Drive.

=== Division of Water Supply Protection ===
The Division of Water Supply Protection manages 150,000 acres (610 km^{2}) of watershed lands and is responsible for the protection of the drinking water supply for approximately 2.5 million residents of Massachusetts, primarily in Greater Boston. This division monitors lakes and ponds, well drillers, and rainfall throughout the Commonwealth.

Protected water supply areas include Quabbin Reservoir, Ware River Watershed, Wachusett Reservoir and Sudbury Reservoir.

=== Bureau of Engineering ===
The Bureau of Engineering provides professional engineering, design, and construction management services in support of DCR properties. In addition to providing engineering services for over 450,000 acres (1,800 km^{2}) of parks, forests, watersheds, beaches, 340 dams, and numerous recreational facilities, the Bureau of Engineering also manages over 525 lane miles of parkways and nearly 300 bridges and tunnels notable for their landmark stature and importance in the Commonwealth's transportation system. The Bureau of Engineering managed and/or operated a number of bridges across the Commonwealth prior to November 2009. All non-pedestrian bridges were transferred to the Massachusetts Department of Transportation on November 1, 2009 as part of a transportation reform law. Originally, a certain number of bridges listed in the act creating MassDOT were to be transferred after December 31, 2014 when ongoing construction was completed. However, a Memorandum of Agreement between DCR and MassDOT instead transferred these bridges in 2009 along with all other DCR vehicular bridges.

==== List of parkways ====
The Bureau of Engineering manages and/or operates a number of parkways across the Commonwealth, including:

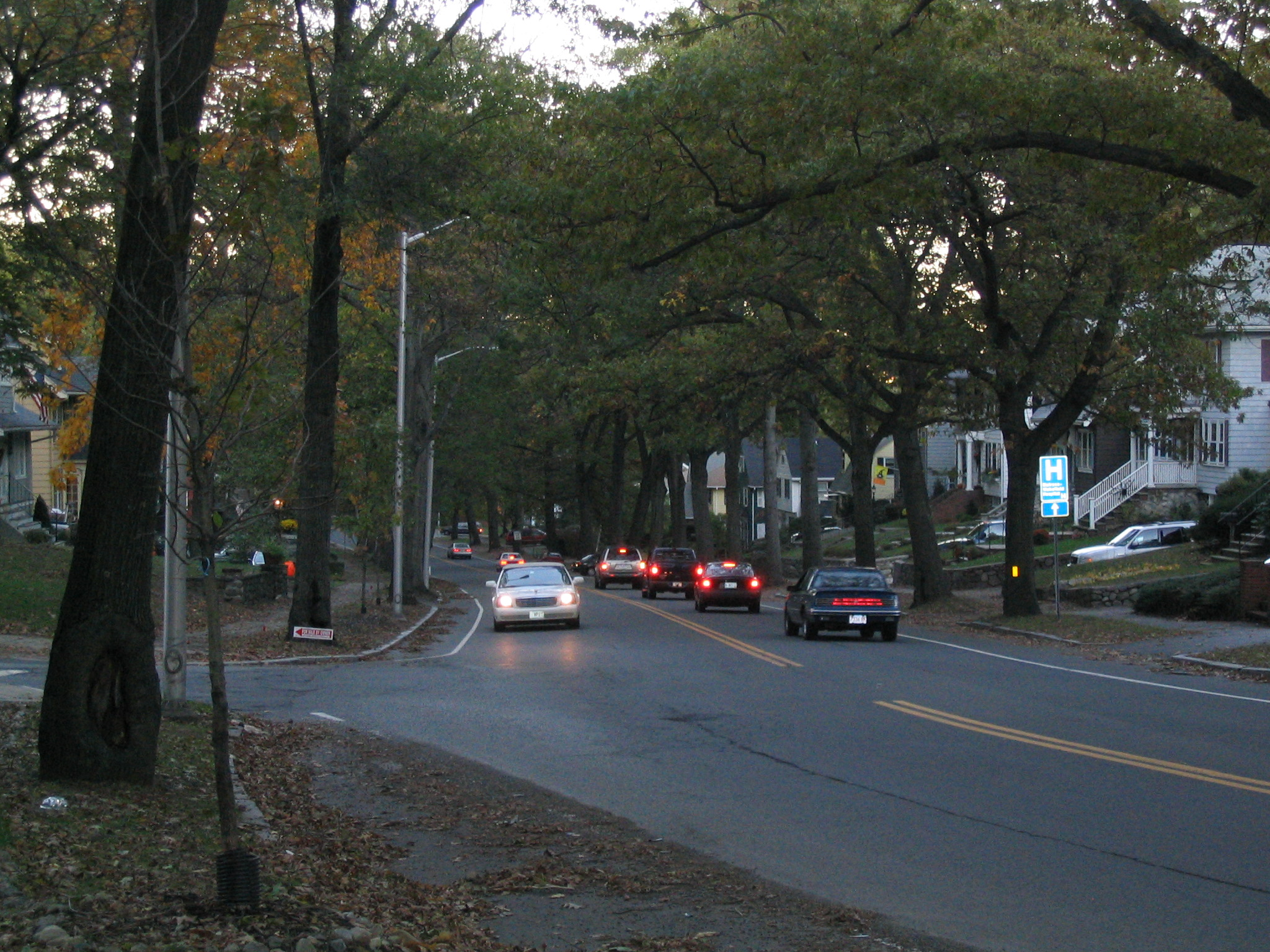
Lynn Fells Parkway in Melrose

- Alewife Brook Parkway
- Arborway
- Birmingham Parkway
- Blue Hills Parkway
- Blue Hills Reservation Parkways
- Boylston Street (Back Bay sections)
- Breakheart Reservation Parkways
- Cambridge Parkway
- Carey Circle
- Charles River Reservation Parkways
- Charles Street (Charles Circle to Leverett Circle)
- Chestnut Hill Drive
- William J. Day Boulevard
- Fellsway Connector Parkways
- Fellsmere Park Parkways
- Fenway
- Fresh Pond Parkway
- Furnace Brook Parkway
- Hammond Pond Parkway
- Hull Shore Drive
- Jamaicaway
- Land Boulevard
- Lynn Fells Parkway
- Lynnway
- Lynn Shore Drive
- Memorial Drive
- Middlesex Fells Reservation Parkways
- Morrissey Boulevard
- Mount Greylock Summit Road
- Mount Wachusett Summit Road
- Mystic Valley Parkway
- Nahant Beach Boulevard
- Nantasket Avenue
- Neponset Valley Parkway
- North Beacon Street (Brighton & Watertown sections)
- Norumbega Road (Weston)
- Old Harbor Reservation Parkways
- Old Colony Parkway
- Park Drive
- Parkman Drive
- Quincy Shore Drive
- Recreation Road (Weston)
- Revere Beach Boulevard
- Revere Beach Parkway
- Riverway
- Stony Brook Reservation Parkways
- Storrow Drive/Soldiers Field Road
- Truman Parkway
- VFW Parkway
- West Roxbury Parkway
- Winthrop Parkway
- Winthrop Shore Drive

==== List of dams ====
The Bureau of Engineering owns and manages and/or operates a number of dams and flood control facilities across the Commonwealth, including:

- Irish Dam (Grafton)
- Moose Hill Reservoir Dam (Spencer)
- Pontoosuc Lake Dam (Pittsfield)
- Unionville Pond Dam (Holden)
- Charles River Dam (Boston)
- Watertown Dam (Watertown)

=== Golf courses ===
DCR is responsible for operating two golf courses that are owned by the Commonwealth of Massachusetts: Leo J. Martin Memorial Golf Course in Weston (18 holes), and Ponkapoag Golf Course in Canton (36 holes). In August 2025, both courses appeared on a list of the 10 worst golf courses in the United States, as compiled by MyGolfSpy, a golf website; the Weston course was ranked the worst, while the Canton course was ranked fifth-worst.

== See also ==
- List of numbered routes in Massachusetts
