= Massachusetts Route 62 =

East-west state highway in Massachusetts, US

Route 62
- Route 62 highlighted in red

Route information
- Maintained by MassDOT
- Length: 82.1817 mi (132.2586 km)

Major junctions
- West end: Route 32 / Route 122 in Barre
- I-495 in Berlin; Route 2 / Route 2A in Concord; US 3 in Bedford; I-93 in Wilmington; US 1 in Danvers; I-95 in Danvers; Route 128 in Danvers
- East end: Route 127 in Beverly

Location
- Country: United States
- State: Massachusetts
- Counties: Worcester, Middlesex, Essex

Highway system
- Massachusetts State Highway System; Interstate; US; State
← Route 60	→ Route 63

Route 62 is an 82.1817-mile-long (132.2586 km) east–west state route in Massachusetts. The route crosses four of the Bay State's 13 interstates (I-190, I-495, I-93, and I-95), as well as U.S. Route 1 (US 1), US 3, Route 2 and Route 128 as it heads from the northern hills of Worcester County through the northern portions of Greater Boston, ending in the North Shore city of Beverly at Route 127.

== Route description ==
Route 62 begins in Barre, in the north central hills of Worcester County, at Routes 32 and 122, at the town's commons and center. It heads northeastward into the town of Hubbardston, intersecting Route 68 before heading into Princeton. In Princeton, Route 62 has a short concurrency with Route 31. It then crosses into Sterling, intersecting with Route 140 and passing underneath Interstate 190 without interchange, before passing through the town's center concurrently with Route 12.

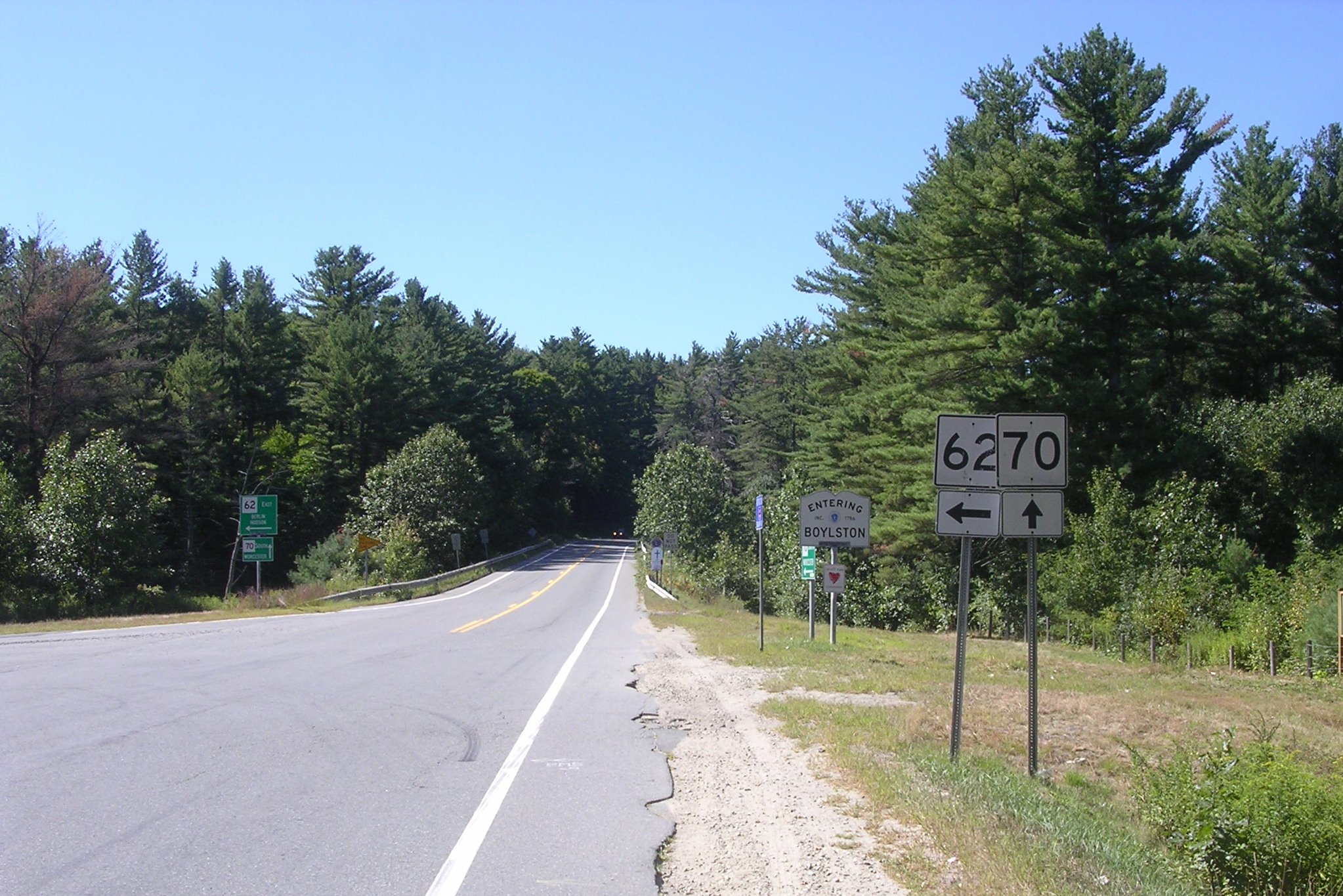
Eastbound with Route 70 in Clinton

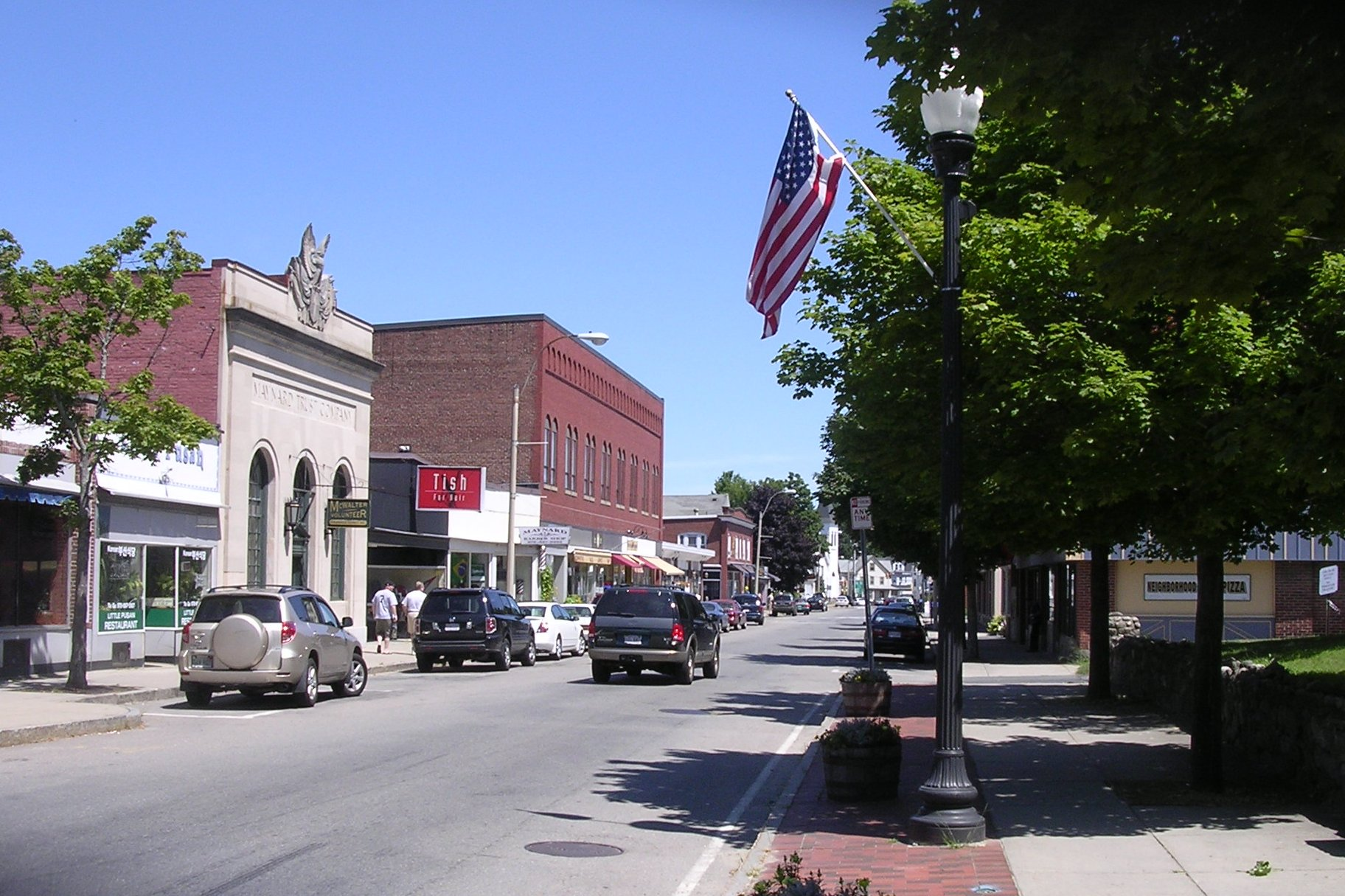
Eastbound in Maynard

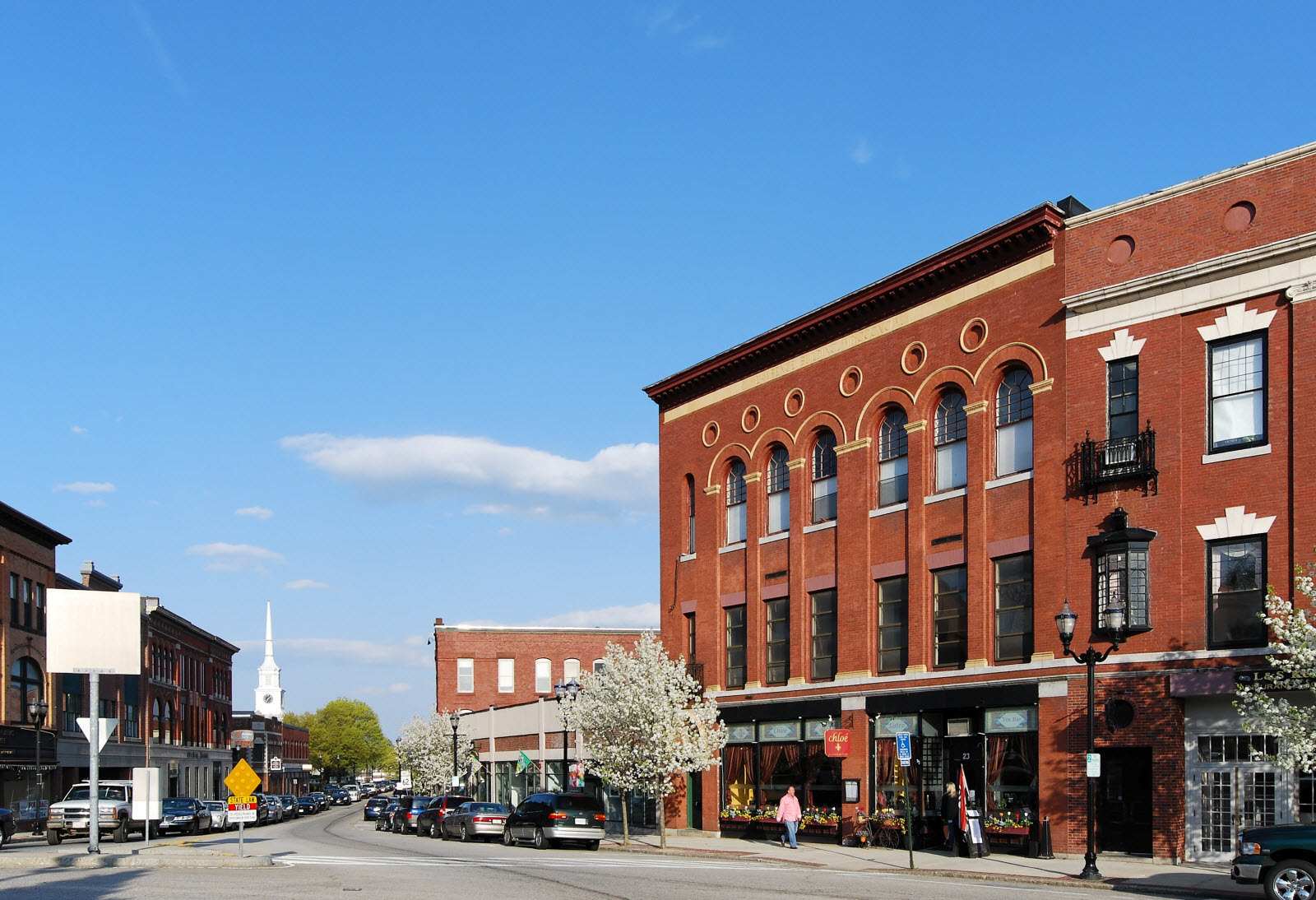
Wood Square, Hudson, at the junction of Routes 62 & 85

From Sterling, Route 62 passes through the southern end of the town of Lancaster before entering Clinton. In Clinton, it is concurrent with Route 70 for most of the town, with a short section being triply concurrent with Route 110. Routes 62 and 70 pass through the center of town and pass the dam on the Nashua River which creates the Wachusett Reservoir before Route 62 heads eastward again, splitting with Route 70 at the Boylston town line. After crossing through the town of Berlin, it has an interchange with Interstate 495 at Exit 67 before crossing into Middlesex County and the town of Hudson.

In Hudson, Route 62 has a junction and short concurrency with Route 85 as it heads eastward, crossing the Assabet River before entering northward into the town of Stow. At the center of Stow, Route 62 turns eastward again, becoming concurrent with Route 117 for two miles into the town of Maynard. In Maynard, the route crosses the Assabet River twice more, the second time concurrently with Route 27. Following the path of the Assabet, it then passes through the southern corner of Acton before heading into Concord. In Concord, Route 62 joins the town's Main Street, passing the West Concord Depot, a commuter rail stop along the Fitchburg Line. As Main Street, Route 62 intersects Route 2 and crosses the Sudbury River before leaving that road at Concord's town common, just south of the site of the Battle of Concord.

Route 62 continues northeastward into Bedford, where it shares a three-way concurrency with Routes 4 and 225, passing the historic Fitch Tavern before splitting from those roads. It then has a junction with U. S. Route 3 at Exit 73 before entering Burlington. It crosses the old Middlesex Turnpike before arcing northward to meet Route 3A just south of the Billerica town line. It becomes concurrent with Route 3A southward for half a mile before turning northward, heading into the town of Wilmington. In Wilmington it crosses Routes 38 and 129 just south of the Wilmington Station along the Lowell Line of the MBTA Commuter Rail line. It then has a junction with Interstate 93 at Exit 34 just east of Route 62's intersection with the southern end of Route 125. After crossing I-93, Route 62 heads eastward into North Reading. It shares a quarter-mile long concurrency with Route 28 before continuing eastward into Essex County and the town of Middleton.

In Middleton, Route 62 heads north one final time, sharing a short wrong-way concurrency with Route 114 before turning eastward, crossing the Ipswich River before finally turning southeastward into the town of Danvers. In Danvers, the route has consecutive interchanges with U.S. Route 1 (along the Newburyport Turnpike) and I-95, just north of the former Danvers State Hospital site. It continues eastward, crossing Route 35 and Route 128 (at Exit 43) before entering Beverly. In Beverly, Route 62 crosses Routes 1A and 22 before finally ending at Route 127, just a tenth of a mile north of Mackerel Cove, Beverly Harbor and Massachusetts Bay.

== Major intersections ==
County	Location	mi	km	Destinations	Notes
Worcester	Barre	0.0	0.0	Route 32 / Route 122 – Petersham, Athol, Rutland, Worcester	Western terminus
Worcester	Hubbardston	6.6	10.6	Route 68 to Route 56 – Holden, Hubbardston	
Worcester	Princeton	12.9	20.8	Route 31 south – Holden, Paxton	Western terminus of Route 31 concurrency
Worcester	Princeton	13.2	21.2	Route 31 north – Fitchburg, Ashby	Eastern terminus of Route 31 concurrency
Worcester	Sterling	16.9	27.2	Route 140 – Westminster, Gardner, West Boylston, Worcester	Moore’s Corner
Worcester	Sterling	19.8	31.9	Route 12 south – West Boylston, Worcester	Western terminus of Route 12 concurrency
Worcester	Sterling	0.0	0.0	Route 12 north to I-190 – Leominster, Fitchburg	Eastern terminus of Route 12 concurrency
Worcester	Clinton	24.7	39.8	Route 70 north – Lancaster, Lunenburg	Western terminus of Route 70 concurrency
Worcester	Clinton	24.8	39.9	Route 110 east – Harvard, Ayer	Western terminus of Route 110 concurrency
Worcester	Clinton	25.1	40.4	Route 110 west – West Boylston, Worcester	Eastern terminus of Route 110 concurrency
Worcester	Clinton	27.2	43.8	Route 70 south – Boylston, Worcester	Eastern terminus of Route 70 concurrency
Worcester	Berlin	31.9	51.3	I-495 – Marlboro, Taunton, Lowell, Lawrence	Exit 67 on I-495; partial cloverleaf interchange
Middlesex	Hudson	33.9	54.6	Route 85 north – Bolton, Boxborough	Western terminus of Route 85 concurrency
Middlesex	Hudson	34.0	54.7	Route 85 south – Marlboro, Southborough	Eastern terminus of Route 85 concurrency
Middlesex	Stow	39.3	63.2	Route 117 west – Bolton, Lancaster	Western terminus of Route 117 concurrency
Middlesex	Maynard	41.3	66.5	Route 117 east – Lincoln, Waltham	Eastern terminus of Route 117 concurrency
Middlesex	Maynard	42.3	68.1	Route 27 south – Sudbury	Western terminus of Route 27 concurrency
Middlesex	Maynard	42.4	68.2	Route 27 north – Acton	Eastern terminus of Route 27 concurrency
Middlesex	Concord	46.6	75.0	Route 2 / Route 2A – Boston, Lexington, Fitchburg, Ayer	Concord Turnpike
Middlesex	Bedford	52.4	84.3	Route 4 north / Route 225 west – Chelmsford, Carlisle	Western terminus of Route 4 / Route 225 concurrency
Middlesex	Bedford	53.4	85.9	Route 4 south / Route 225 east – Lexington, Boston	Eastern terminus of Route 4 / Route 225 concurrency
Middlesex	Bedford	55.1	88.7	US 3 to I-95 / Route 128 – Lowell, Nashua, NH	Exit 73 on US 3 (Northwest Expressway); partial cloverleaf interchange
Middlesex	Burlington	55.8	89.8	Middlesex Turnpike – Bedford, Burlington	
Middlesex	Burlington	57.9	93.2	Route 3A north – Billerica	Western terminus of Route 3A concurrency
Middlesex	Burlington	58.6	94.3	Route 3A south – Burlington	Eastern terminus of Route 3A concurrency
Middlesex	Wilmington	61.8	99.5	Route 38 / Route 129 – Woburn, Reading	
Middlesex	Wilmington	64.2	103.3	I-93 to Route 125 – Boston, Concord, NH	Exit 34 on I-93 (Northern Expressway); partial cloverleaf interchange
Middlesex	North Reading	66.6	107.2	Route 28 north – Andover	Western terminus of Route 28 concurrency
Middlesex	North Reading	66.8	107.5	Route 28 south – Reading	Eastern terminus of Route 28 concurrency
Essex	Middleton	73.2	117.8	Route 114 east – Peabody, Salem	Western terminus of Route 114 concurrency
Essex	Middleton	73.3	118.0	Route 114 west – Andover, Lawrence	Eastern terminus Route 114 concurrency
Essex	Danvers	76.1	122.5	US 1 to I-95 north – Lynnfield, Boston, Topsfield, Portsmouth, NH	Cloverleaf interchange
Essex	Danvers	76.3	122.8	I-95 south – Boston, Providence, RI	Exit 69 on I-95; entrance from I-95 north only; partial diamond interchange
Essex	Danvers	78.1	125.7	Route 35 – Topsfield, Peabody	
Essex	Danvers	78.9	127.0	Route 128 to I-95 / US 1 – Boston, Gloucester	Exit 43 on Route 128; diamond interchange
Essex	Beverly	81.3	130.8	Route 1A – Beverly, Hamilton	
Essex	Beverly	81.7	131.5	Route 22 – Essex, Beverly	
Essex	Beverly	82.18	132.26	Route 127 – Manchester-by-the-Sea, Rockport	Eastern terminus
1.000 mi = 1.609 km; 1.000 km = 0.621 mi: Concurrency terminus; Incomplete access
