= Massachusetts Route 127 =

State highway in Essex County, Massachusetts, US

Route 127
- Route 127 highlighted in red

Route information
- Maintained by MassDOT
- Length: 26.70 mi (42.97 km)
- Existed: by 1930–present

Major junctions
- South end: Route 1A / Route 22 in Beverly
- Route 62 in Beverly; Route 127A / Route 128 in Gloucester; Route 127A in Rockport
- North end: Route 128 in Gloucester

Location
- Country: United States
- State: Massachusetts
- Counties: Essex

Highway system
- Massachusetts State Highway System; Interstate; US; State
← Route 126	→ Route 128

Route 127 is a 26.70-mile-long (42.97 km) north–south Massachusetts state route that runs from Beverly to Gloucester. Much of the northern part of the route is in Cape Ann. Route 127's southern terminus is at Route 1A and the southern terminus of Route 22 in Beverly and the northern terminus is at Route 128 in Gloucester.

== Route description ==
Route 127 begins in Beverly concurrently with Route 22 at Route 1A, just north of the Veteran's Memorial Bridge. Shortly afterward, the two routes split, with Route 127 heading east towards the shore, following past Independence Park and Lyons Park overlooking Beverly Harbor. Route 127 passes the eastern end of Route 62 before turning eastward again. Route 127 passes Endicott College and the Prides Crossing and Beverly Farms MBTA stations before continuing eastward into Manchester-by-the-Sea.

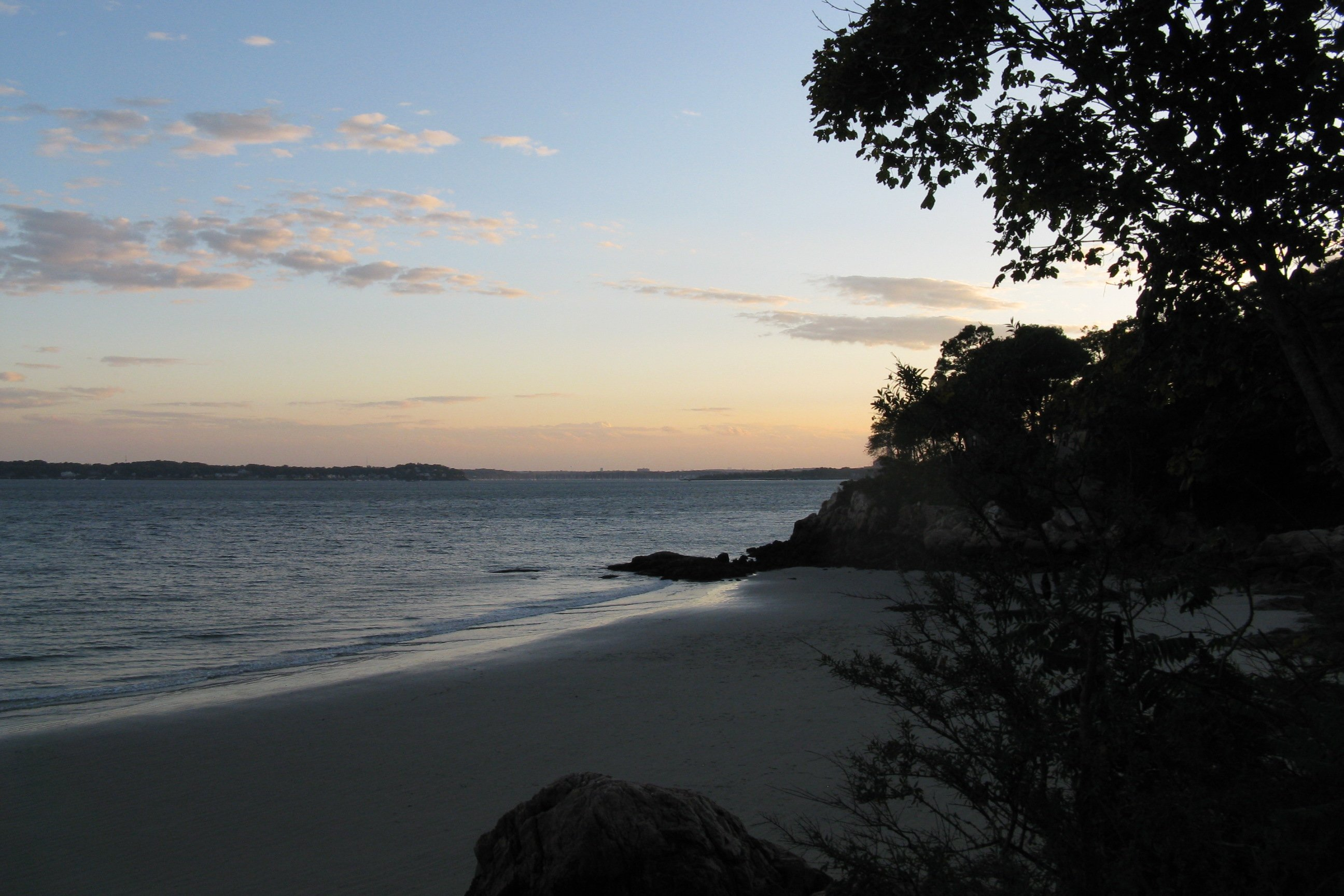
A view from Route 127 in Beverly

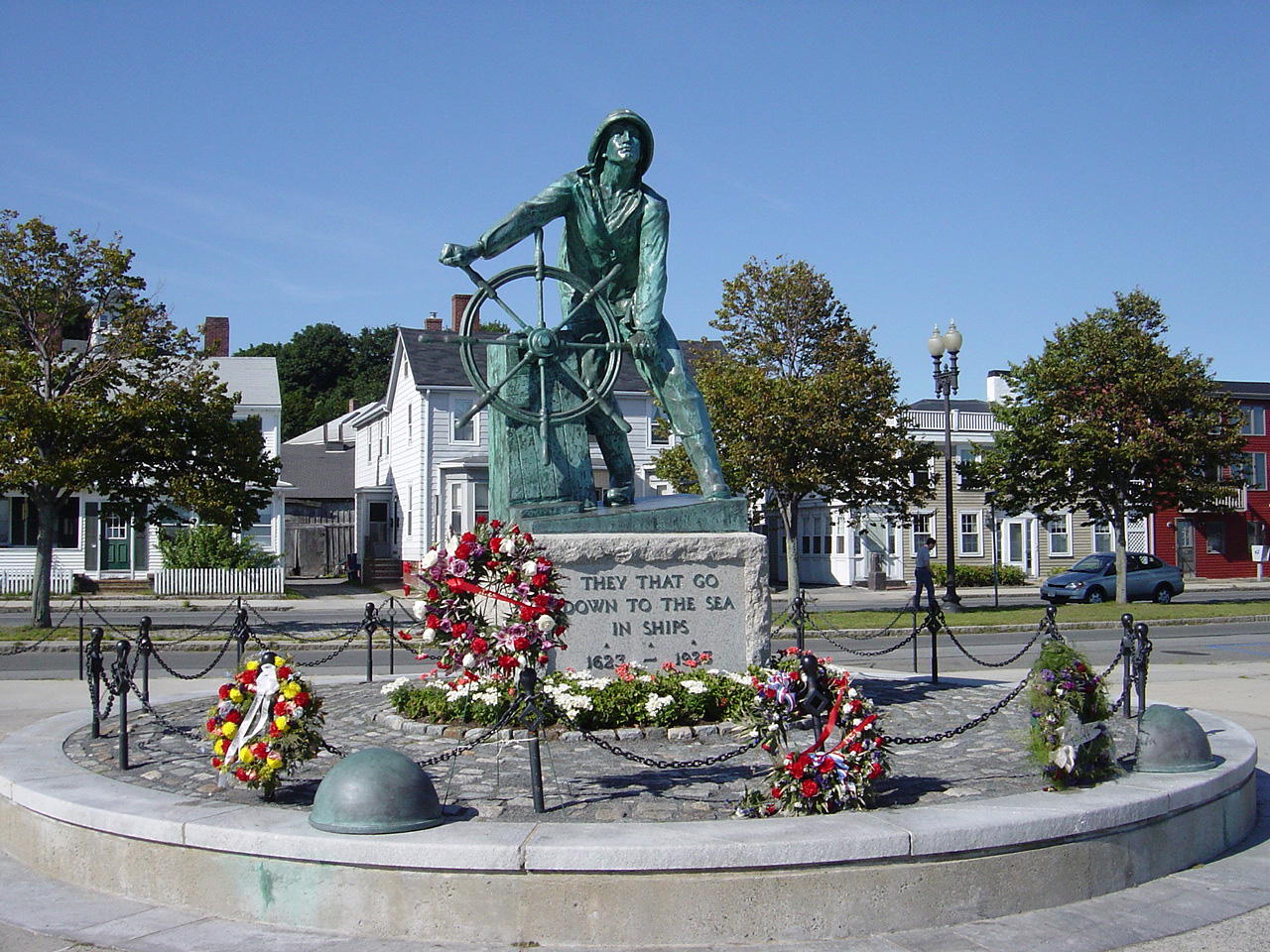
The Gloucester Fisherman's Memorial, with Route 127 passing behind it.

Once in Manchester-by-the-Sea, Route 127 acts as the main route through town, passing the downtown area and just north of the Manchester MBTA commuter rail station. It crosses the tracks one more time (next to Sweeney Park) as it heads into Gloucester. Once in Gloucester, the route passes the Magnolia section of town before passing Ravenswood Park and Stage Fort Park, site of a large marker commemorating the city's founding. Just before crossing Blynman Canal, Route 127 meets the end of Route 133. As it passes the Western Harbor, Route 127 passes the Gloucester Fisherman's Memorial as well as passing just north of several of the city's major fishing companies (including Gorton's of Gloucester). Just north of the Inner Harbor of Gloucester, Route 127 meets the southern end of Route 127A, just before crossing near the northern end of Route 128. Route 127 then crosses into the town of Rockport. The route passes towards the downtown, meeting the northern end of Route 127A and passing the Rockport station. Route 127 then heads north near the shore, passing Gull Cove, Rowe's Cove, Pigeon Cove and Ocean View, before bending southward (contrary to its signage) at Halibut Point State Park. It then re-enters Gloucester, heading southward along Rowley Shore and along the banks of the Annisquam and Mill Rivers before finally ending at Route 128, at Grant Circle.

Overall, it is noted for being a scenic road with a good view along much of Essex County’s coast.

North Shore Route 127 in Beverly was named as one of the 1,000 places to visit in Massachusetts by the Great Places in Massachusetts Commission.

== History ==
Route 127's route in 1930 was almost identical to the current route. However, it originally continued south of Grant Circle to end at itself. It was cut back in the mid-1990s.

== Major intersections ==
The entire route is in Essex County.

Location	mi	km	Destinations	Notes
Beverly	0.00	0.00	Route 1A north – Salem, Wenham, Ipswich Route 22 begins	Southern terminus; southern terminus of Route 22
Beverly	0.10	0.16	Route 22 north – Essex	Northern end of Route 22 concurrency
Beverly	1.10	1.77	Route 62 west – Beverly Center	Eastern terminus of Route 62
Gloucester	13.60	21.89	Route 133 west to Route 128 – Essex, Ipswich	Eastern terminus of Route 133
Gloucester	15.10	24.30	Route 127A north – Rockport	Southern terminus of Route 127A
Gloucester	15.30	24.62	Route 128 – Beverly, Boston, East Gloucester, Rocky Neck	
Rockport	19.10	30.74	Route 127A south – Rockport Center, Gloucester, Bearskin Neck	Northern terminus of Route 127A
Gloucester	26.70	42.97	Route 128 – Beverly, Boston, Rockport	Northern terminus; Grant Circle
1.000 mi = 1.609 km; 1.000 km = 0.621 mi: Concurrency terminus

== Route 127A ==
Route 127A
- Location: Gloucester-Rockport
- Existed: c. 1950–present

Route 127A is a north–south Massachusetts state route that runs from Gloucester to Rockport. All of the route is in Cape Ann, and it serves as a coastal alternative to Route 127.

The route starts in Gloucester where Route 127 leaves East Main Street and turns north to become Eastern Avenue. Route 127A continues east as East Main Street for about 500 feet before meeting the northern terminus of Route 128. Here, Route 127A takes the name of Bass Avenue, which it retains for half a mile before coming to an intersection with Atlantic and Thatcher Roads. At this point, Route 127A turns north onto Thatcher Road, bending northeast and east again, while passing Good Harbor Beach. After passing the beach entrance, the road begins to bend in a northeasterly direction as it crosses the town line into Rockport, keeping the name of Thatcher Road. After 1.6 miles in Rockport, the route comes to an intersection with South Street. Route 127A veers northwards onto South Street, eventually bending to the west. At Prospect Street, the road takes the name of Mt. Pleasant Street and heads northwest to downtown Rockport. As it approaches downtown, passing part of Rockport Harbor, Route 127A turns southwest onto Broadway and abruptly heads away from downtown Rockport. Finally, Route 127A terminates at an intersection with Route 127. Route 127A was commissioned in the early 1950s.
