= Massachusetts Route 22 =

State highway in Essex County, Massachusetts, US

Route 22
- Route 22 highlighted in red

Route information
- Maintained by MassDOT
- Length: 9.588 mi (15.430 km)

Major junctions
- South end: Route 1A / Route 127 in Beverly
- Route 62 in Beverly; Route 128 in Beverly
- North end: Route 133 in Essex

Location
- Country: United States
- State: Massachusetts
- Counties: Essex

Highway system
- Massachusetts State Highway System; Interstate; US; State
← Route 21	→ Route 23

Route 22 is a short 9.588-mile-long (15.430 km) north–south Massachusetts state route that connects Route 1A and Route 127 in Beverly and Route 133 in Essex. The entire route is located within Essex County.

== Route description ==
Route 22 begins in Beverly at the Northern end of the Essex Bridge, at the intersection of Cabot Street, Rantoul Street (Route 1A) and Water Street (Route 127). Route 22 proceeds northward along Cabot Street into downtown Beverly, where it forks off onto Essex Street, and heads northward out of the downtown area and past the Montserrat MBTA commuter rail station. Route 22 crosses Route 128 at exit 47 (formerly exit 18), and then winds northward into Wenham, making two turns before quickly entering Hamilton. It then makes another turn in Hamilton, onto another Essex Street, which in turn crosses into the town of Essex north of Chebacco Lake. Route 22 ends at Route 133 in downtown Essex, near the head of the Essex River.

== Major intersections ==
The entire route is in Essex County.

Location	mi	km	Destinations	Notes
Beverly	0.00	0.00	Route 1A north – Salem, Beverly, Wenham, Gloucester Route 127 begins	Southern terminus; southern terminus of Route 127
Beverly	0.10	0.16	Route 127 north (Stone Street) – Manchester, Gloucester	Northern end of Route 127 concurrency
Beverly	0.81	1.30	Route 62 (Dane Street) to Route 127 – Manchester	
Beverly	2.72	4.38	Route 128 (Yankee Division Highway) – Gloucester, Rockport, Peabody, Boston	Exit 47 on Route 128
Essex	9.59	15.43	Route 133 (Main Street) – Gloucester, Rockport, Ipswich, Georgetown	Northern terminus
1.000 mi = 1.609 km; 1.000 km = 0.621 mi: Concurrency terminus
