= Massachusetts Route 133 =

East-west state highway in Massachusetts, US

Route 133
- Route 133 highlighted in red

Route information
- Maintained by MassDOT
- Length: 40.87 mi (65.77 km)
- Existed: 1930–present

Major junctions
- West end: Route 38 / Route 110 in Lowell
- I-495 in Tewksbury; I-93 in Andover; Route 114 in North Andover; I-95 in Georgetown; US 1 in Rowley; Route 128 in Gloucester
- East end: Route 127 in Gloucester

Location
- Country: United States
- State: Massachusetts
- Counties: Middlesex, Essex

Highway system
- Massachusetts State Highway System; Interstate; US; State
← Route 132	→ Route 134

Route 133 is a 40.87-mile-long (65.77 km) east–west Massachusetts state route that runs from Route 38 and Route 110 in Lowell to Route 127 in Gloucester.

== Route description ==
Route 133 begins at the junction of Route 38 and Route 110 in Lowell, where Route 110 begins a concurrency with Route 38 northbound. Route 133 heads east from this point, heading through the northern end of Tewksbury, where it has a junction with I-495 at Exit 94. Shortly after crossing the highway, Route 133 enters Essex County and the town of Andover. In Andover, Route 133 crosses I-93 at Exit 39 and continues eastward, bypassing the town center to the north as it crosses Route 28 in Shawsheen Village.

From Shawsheen Village, Route 133 heads northward into North Andover, where the road crosses Route 114 (the Salem Turnpike) just north of Merrimack College. It then joins Route 125 for a concurrency that lasts for 2.7 miles (4.3 km). The two routes split next to Lawrence Municipal Airport, with Route 133 passing the northern banks of Lake Cochichewick and Route 125 heading northward into Haverhill. The route passes through the village of West Boxford before continuing into Georgetown.

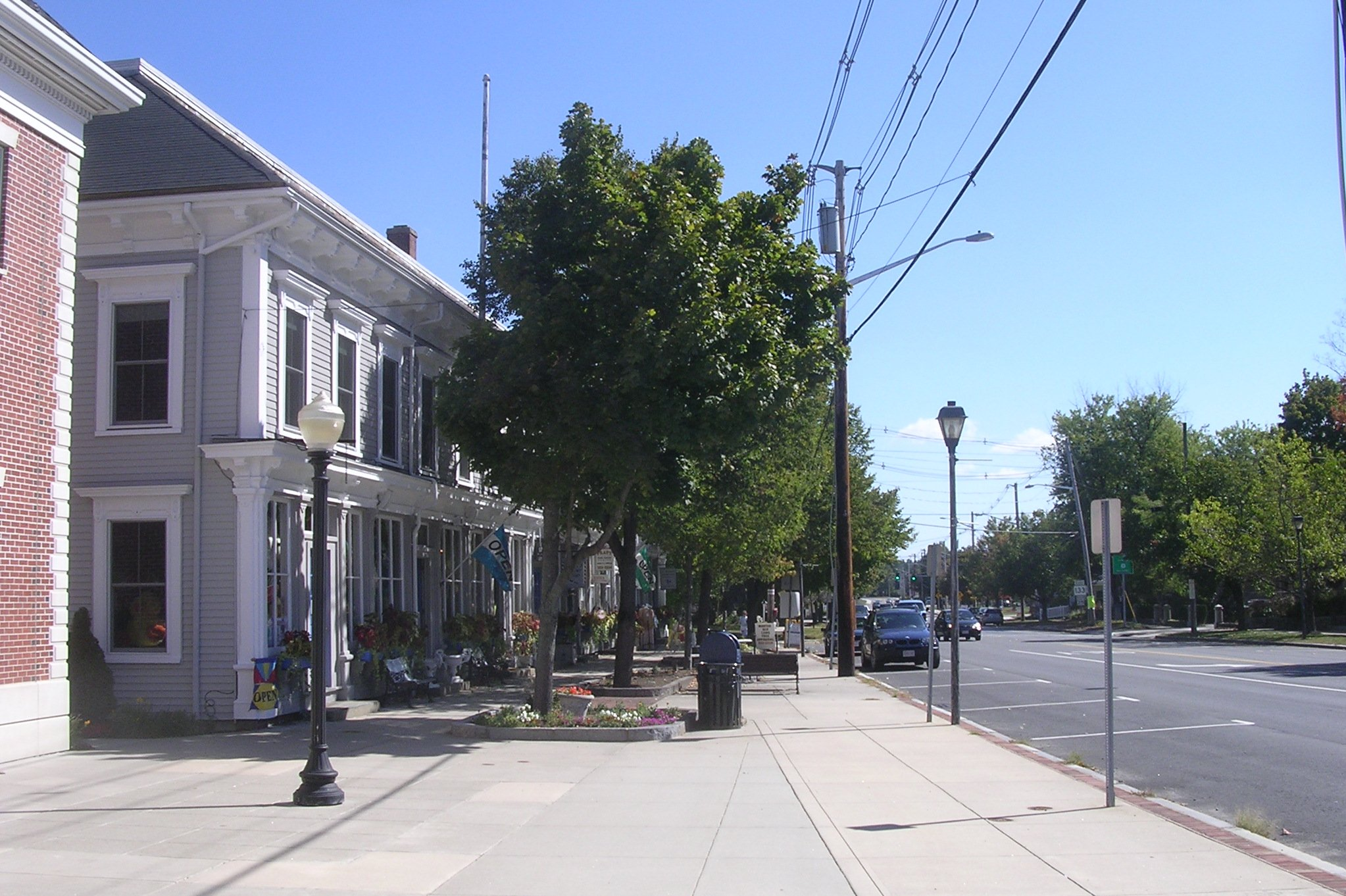
Route 133 eastbound in Georgetown Center

In Georgetown, Route 133 passes south of the Lufkins Brook Area before meeting Route 97 for a short concurrency that lasts for a tenth of a mile. The two routes split at the center of town, with Route 97 heading northwest on West Main Street and Route 133 heading southeast on East Main Street. Route 133 then crosses I-95 at Exit 78 before entering the town of Rowley. In Rowley, Route 133 crosses U.S Route 1 (the Newburyport Turnpike) at Kent Corner, before it meets Route 1A. Route 133 then begins a concurrency with Route 1A heading southbound into Ipswich.

In Ipswich, the two routes cross the Newburyport Line railroad tracks as it enters the downtown area. The two routes cross the historic Choate Bridge over the Ipswich River concurrently, before turning southward, passing through the historic village before splitting once more, with Route 133 heading east-southeastward into Essex. Route 133 passes the northern end of Route 22 near the crossing of the Essex River before Route 133 heads into Gloucester. In Gloucester, Route 133 crosses Route 128 at exit 53 before crossing the Little River (an offshoot of the Annisquam River) and passing the West Gloucester MBTA station. Route 133 finally ends at Route 127, just west of the bridge over the Blynman Canal.

== History ==
In 1930, Route 133 extended from Lowell to Rowley, ending at Route 1A. Between 1959 and 1961, it was extended to replace what was MA Route 121 (which existed from Ipswich to Gloucester via Essex).

== Major intersections ==
County	Location	mi	km	Destinations	Notes
Middlesex	Lowell	0.00	0.00	Route 38 / Route 110 – Dracut, Lawrence, Tewksbury, Chelmsford, Worcester	Western terminus
Middlesex	Tewksbury	3.4	5.5	I-495 – Lowell, Marlboro, Lawrence, Haverhill	Exit 94 on I-495
Essex	Andover	5.8	9.3	I-93 – Boston, Concord, NH	Exit 39 on I-93
Essex	Andover	8.4	13.5	Route 28 – Lawrence, Reading, Boston	
Essex	North Andover	9.6	15.4	Route 114 – Lawrence, Middleton, Danvers	
Essex	North Andover	9.8	15.8	Route 125 south	Southern end of Route 125 concurrency
Essex	North Andover	12.6	20.3	Route 125 north – Haverhill	Northern end of Route 125 concurrency
Essex	Georgetown	19.5	31.4	Route 97 south – Topsfield	Southern end of Route 97 concurrency
Essex	Georgetown	19.6	31.5	Route 97 north – Groveland, Haverhill	Northern end of Route 97 concurrency
Essex	Georgetown	21.5	34.6	I-95 – Peabody, Boston, Salisbury, Portsmouth, NH	Exit 78 on I-95
Essex	Rowley	24.5	39.4	US 1 – Topsfield, Boston, Newburyport	Kent Corner
Essex	Rowley	26.1	42.0	Route 1A north – Rowley	Northern end of Route 1A concurrency
Essex	Ipswich	30.0	48.3	Route 1A south – Hamilton	Southern end of Route 1A concurrency
Essex	Essex	34.5	55.5	Route 22 south – Beverly	Northern terminus of Route 22
Essex	Gloucester	38.0	61.2	Route 128 – Peabody, Boston, Gloucester, Rockport	Exit 53 on Route 128
Essex	Gloucester	40.87	65.77	Route 127 – Gloucester Center, Rockport, Magnolia, Manchester	Eastern terminus
1.000 mi = 1.609 km; 1.000 km = 0.621 mi: Concurrency terminus
