= Massachusetts Route 35 =

State highway in Essex County, Massachusetts, US

Route 35
- Route 35 highlighted in red

Route information
- Maintained by MassDOT
- Length: 5.8 mi (9.3 km)

Major junctions
- South end: Route 114 in Peabody
- Route 128 in Danvers; Route 62 in Danvers
- North end: Route 97 in Topsfield

Location
- Country: United States
- State: Massachusetts
- Counties: Essex

Highway system
- Massachusetts State Highway System; Interstate; US; State
← Route 33	→ Route 36

Route 35 is a 5.8-mile-long (9.3 km) state highway in the U.S. State of Massachusetts running through the towns of Danvers and Peabody in northeastern Massachusetts. Its southern terminus is at Route 114 in Peabody and its northern terminus is at Route 97 in Topsfield.

== Route description ==
Route 35 begins at Route 114 in Peabody, as that route turns left off the right-of-way towards Route 128 and the Northshore Mall. After passing Bishop Fenwick High, Route 35 enters Danvers in the Danversport section of that town. It crosses the Waters River and Crane River before making a left turn, crossing under Route 128 at exit 42. The road goes through downtown Danvers before turning northward, intersecting Route 62. It heads through the Putnamville section of Danvers, passing the Putnamville Reservoir (also known as the Beverly & Danvers Reservoir) before finally ending just yards over the Topsfield and Wenham town lines at Route 97.

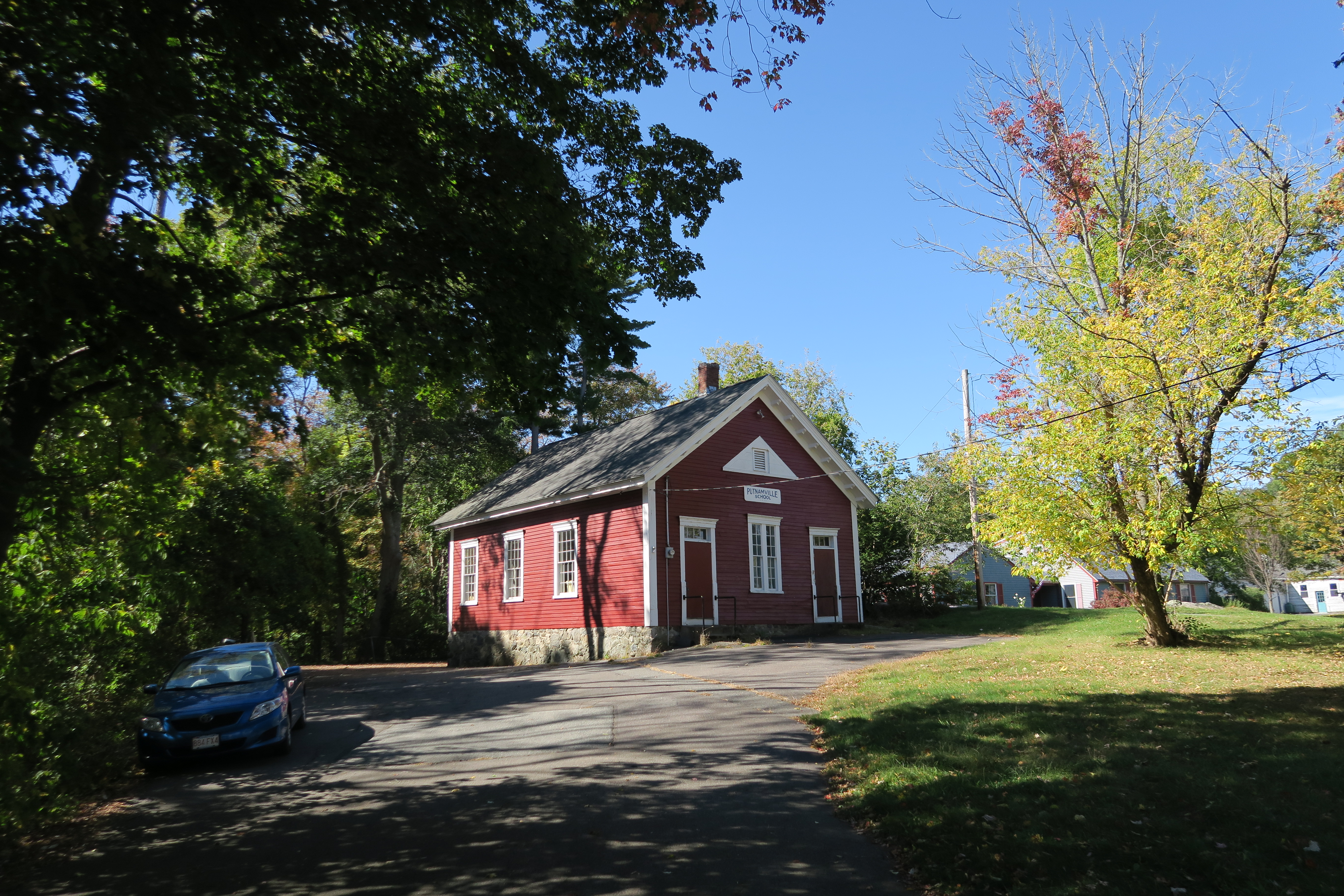
Putnamville School on Route 35 in Danvers

== Major intersections ==
The entire route is in Essex County.

Location	mi	km	Destinations	Notes
Peabody	0.0	0.0	Route 114 – Middleton, Andover, Salem	Southern terminus
Danvers	1.7	2.7	Route 128 to I-95 / US 1 – Beverly, Gloucester, Boston	Exit 42 on Route 128; diamond interchange
Danvers	2.7	4.3	Route 62 – Beverly, Middleton	
Topsfield	5.8	9.3	Route 97 – Topsfield, Haverhill, Beverly, Salem	Northern terminus
1.000 mi = 1.609 km; 1.000 km = 0.621 mi
