= Prides Crossing station =

Former railway station in Beverly, Massachusetts

Prides Crossing
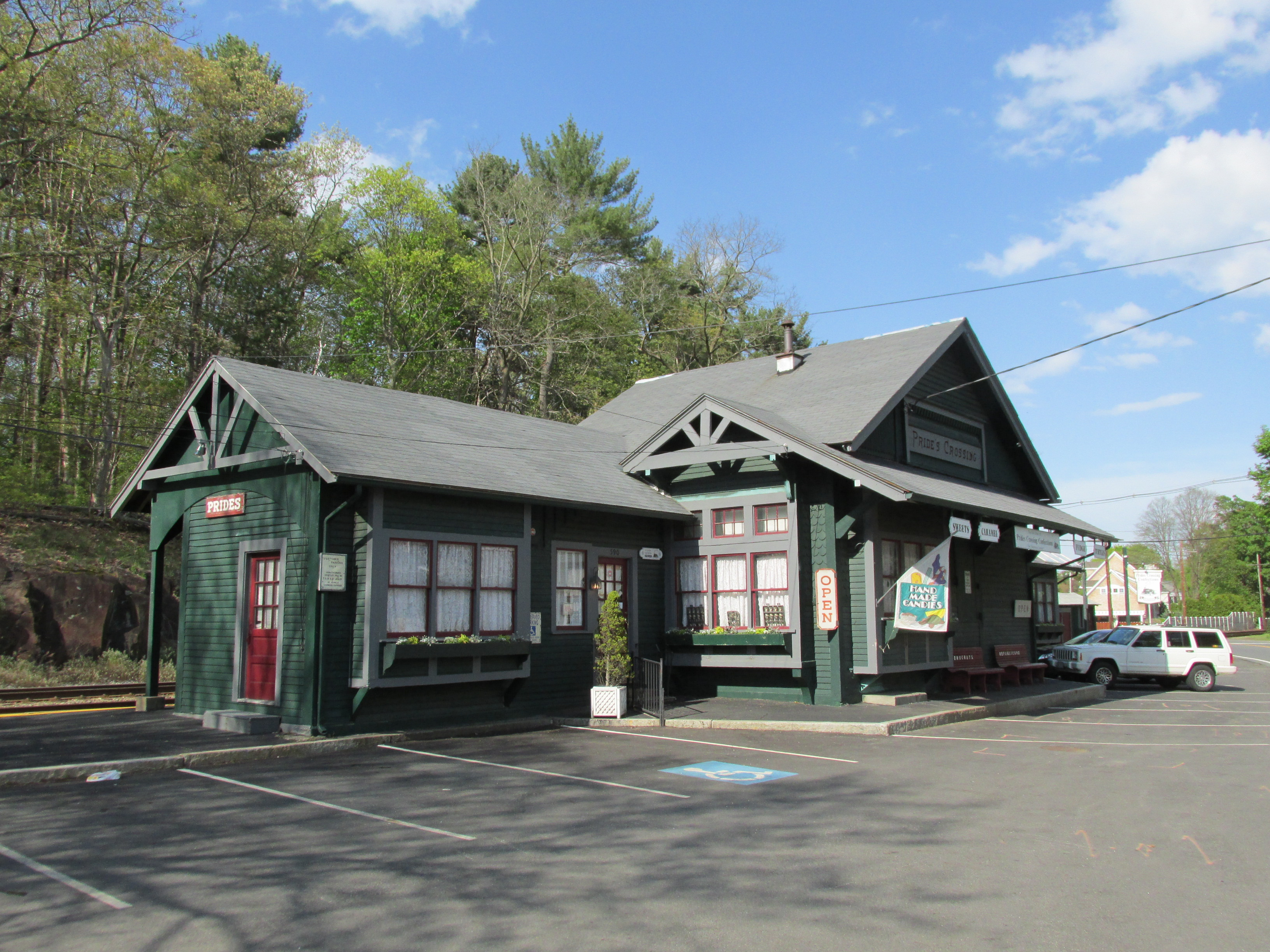
- The former Prides Crossing station building in 2013

General information
- Location: 600 Hale Street, Beverly, Massachusetts
- Coordinates: 42.5594°N 70.8255°W
- Line: Gloucester Branch
- Platforms: 1 side platform
- Tracks: 2

Construction
- Accessible: No

Other information
- Fare zone: 5

History
- Opened: c. 1850s
- Closed: December 14, 2020
- Rebuilt: c. 1879

Passengers
- 2018: 15 daily boardings

Former services
Preceding station	MBTA	Following station
Montserrat toward North Station	Newburyport/Rockport Line limited service	Beverly Farms toward Rockport
Location

Prides Crossing station is a former MBTA Commuter Rail station on the Newburyport/Rockport Line, located in the village of Prides Crossing in Beverly, Massachusetts. It was opened by the Eastern Railroad as a flag stop in the mid-19th century. A stick style wooden station building was constructed around 1880 as wealthy residents built summer homes in the area. The Eastern Railroad was acquired in 1885 by the Boston and Maine Railroad (B&M), which operated commuter service to Prides Crossing until the Massachusetts Bay Transportation Authority (MBTA) took over in the 1970s. Prides Crossing was reduced to peak-hour-only service in 1981. It was temporarily closed in December 2020 because of low ridership and a lack of accessibility, with the closure becoming indefinite in April 2021. The former station building, not used by the railroad since the mid-20th century, is occupied by a private business.

== Station design ==
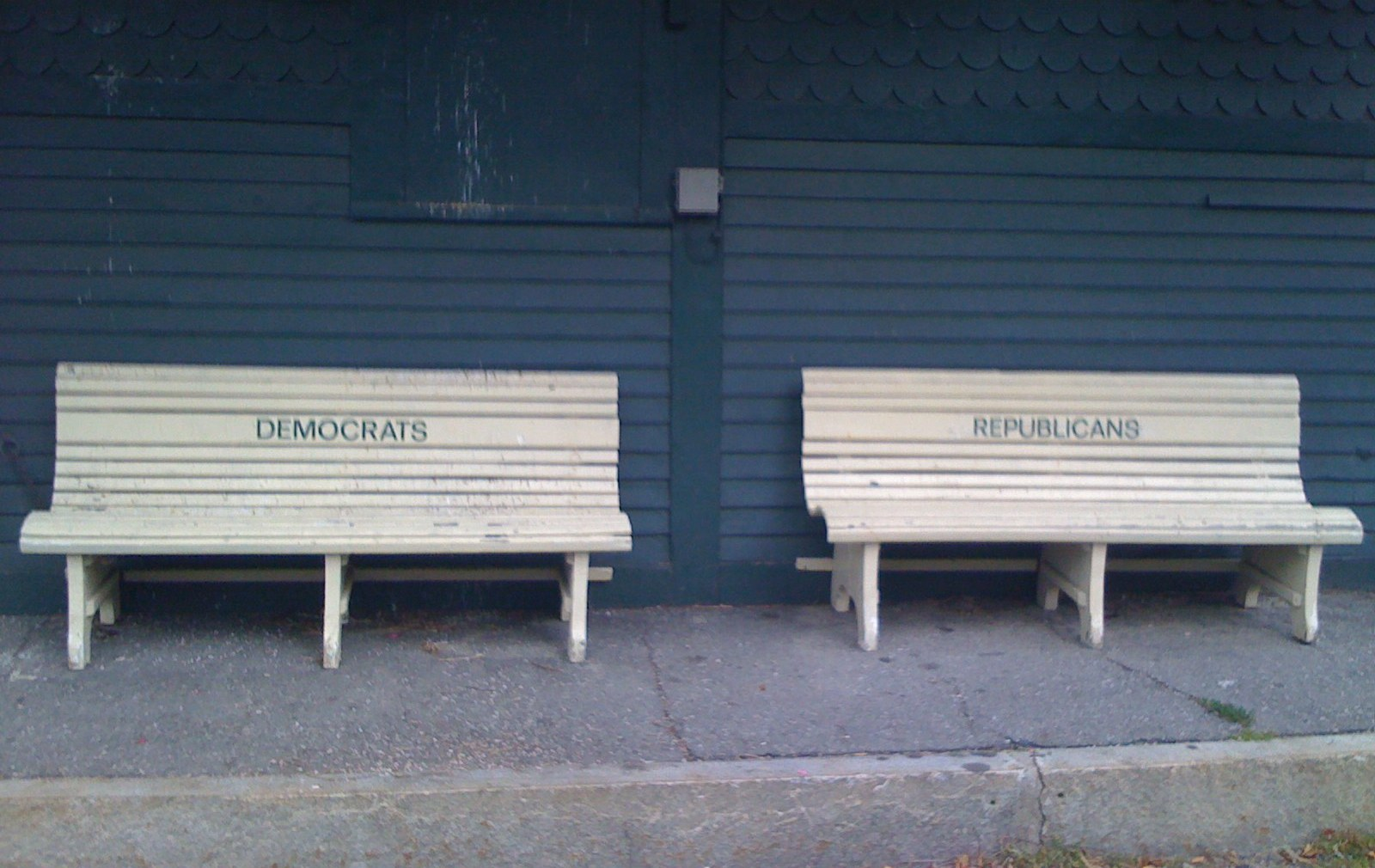
The "Democrats" and "Republicans" benches, a local landmark, in 2008

Prides Crossing station was located in the village of Prides Crossing, just west of the level crossing of the Gloucester Branch on Hale Street (Route 127). It had a single low-level side platform on the south side of the two tracks, with an asphalt patch crossing the south track to allow passengers to reach trains on the north track. The station was not accessible.

The former station building, a one-story stick style structure now occupied by a private business, is located on the south side of the tracks adjacent to the platform. The original canopies have been cut back and enclosed for additional space, and the main building modified as well. On the street side of the station building are two benches labeled "Democrats" and "Republicans", which have been local landmarks for decades. In 2015, the well-worn original benches were auctioned for charity and replaced with replicas.

== History ==
=== Early history ===
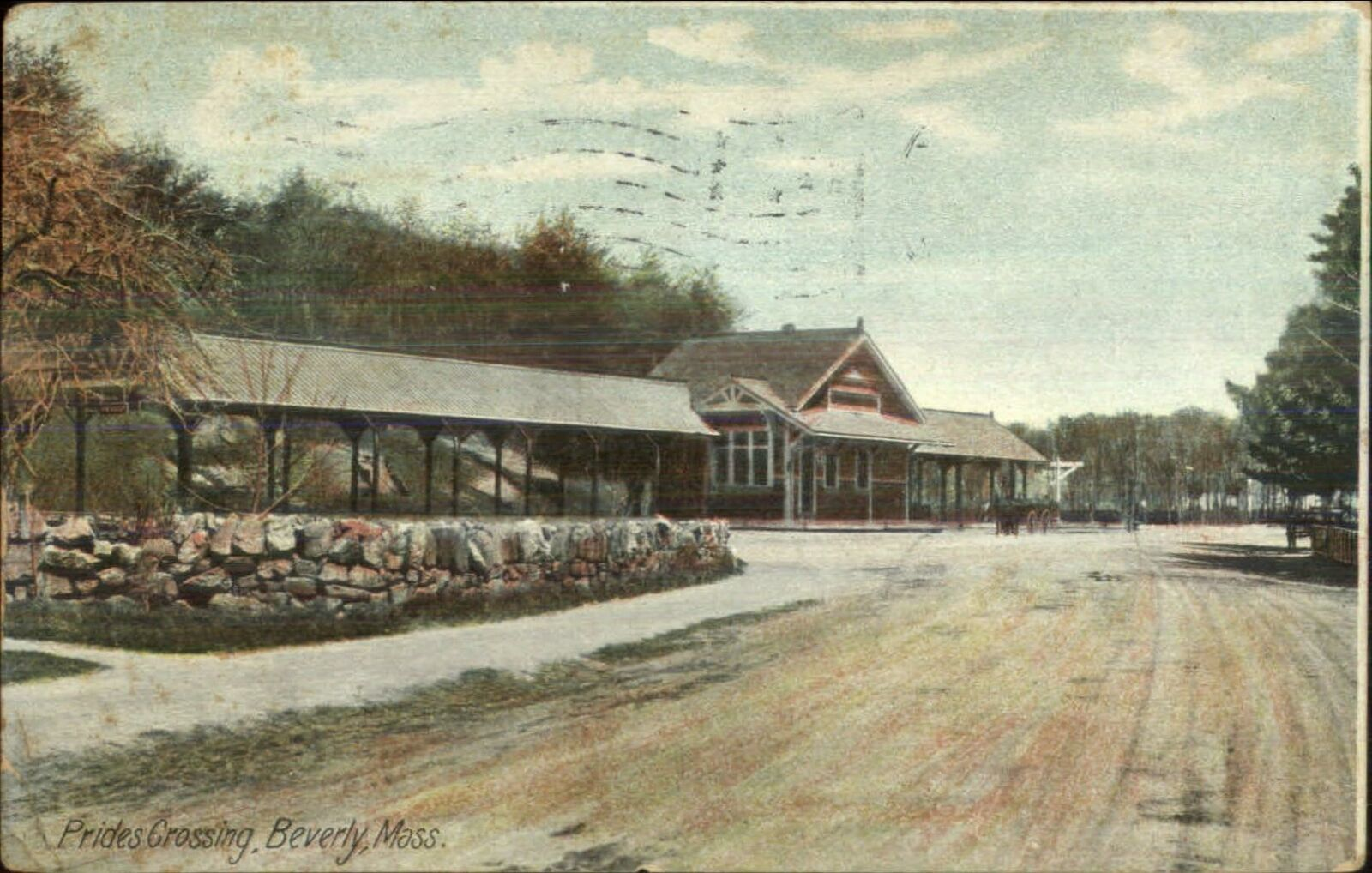
A 1907 postcard of the station

In March 1845, the Eastern Railroad received permission to build a branch line from Beverly to Gloucester. The Gloucester Branch opened to Manchester on August 3, 1847, and to Gloucester on December 1. By the 1850s, the railroad had flag stops at several locations in Beverly, including at Prides (Prides Crossing). The location was named for John Pride – supposedly a nephew of Thomas Pride – who was granted land in the area in 1636. The station had a small shelter and a flagman "stone deaf and so indifferent to the approach of the train that the passengers had to do their own flagging."

A wooden station building – the "tiniest" of the stations in Beverly – was built in 1879 or 1880. Commuting from stops on the Gloucester Branch was possible from the 1870s onward. Prides Crossing was often used by the wealthy residents, including William Loring, who built their summer homes nearby in the later decades of the 19th century and the early 20th century. William Henry Moore and Henry Clay Frick had sidings near the station for their private railroad cars. (The concrete shed for Frick's car Westmoreland, later converted to a private residence, is still extant at 49 Thissell Street.)

The Eastern Railroad became part of the Boston and Maine Railroad (B&M) in 1885. Not until the early 20th century did the station appear in public timetables. The interior woodwork was damaged by a fire on November 12, 1903. In 1915, Moore proposed to fund a new stone station – provided that it was renamed "Moores Crossing". Between 1924 and 1926, service to the station was reduced from 18 inbound and 16 outbound trains to 6 in each direction, which led to nearby estate owners having difficulty retaining domestic workers. Part of the canopy was removed in the 1940s.

=== MBTA era ===
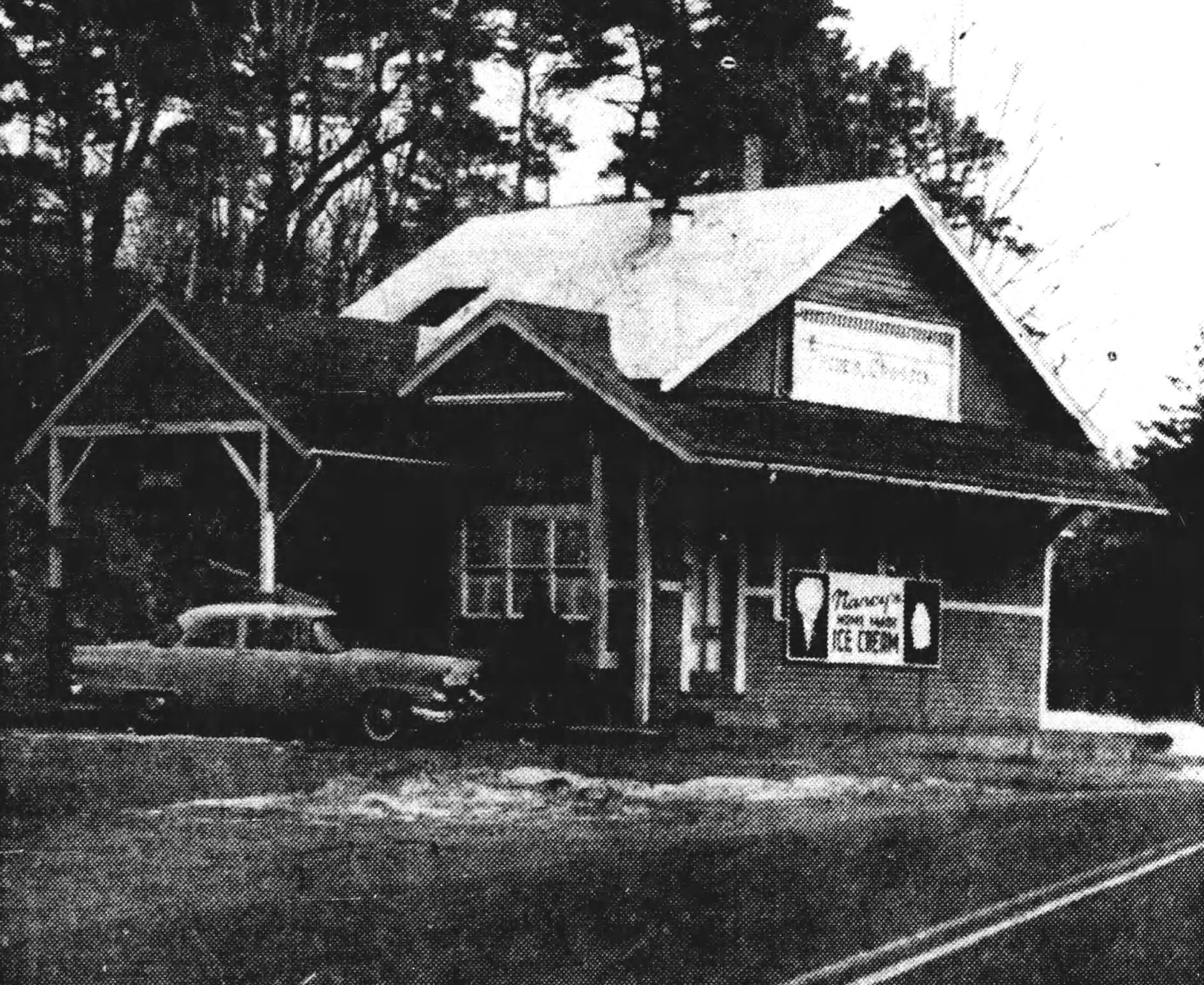
The station building, converted to an ice cream parlor, in 1962

The B&M sold or leased many disused station buildings in the mid-20th century. The station building at Prides Crossing was converted to an ice cream parlor by 1962, and to a general store by 1968. The Massachusetts Bay Transportation Authority (MBTA) was formed in 1964 to subsidize suburban commuter rail service. On January 18, 1965, the MBTA began subsidizing some B&M service, including as far as Manchester on the Gloucester Branch. The MBTA bought most B&M commuter rail assets, including the Gloucester Branch, on December 27, 1976. Weekend and midday service to Prides Crossing was ended on February 1, 1981, due to budget cuts, leaving the station with only limited peak-hour service. However, peak-hour express trains for the wealthy North Shore communities, which made only one stop between Prides Crossing and Boston, lasted into the 1980s.

On August 11, 1981, a westbound MBTA Commuter Rail train collided with an eastbound B&M freight train at Prides Crossing. The cab car leading the MBTA train was thrust into the air over the freight locomotive. Two trainmen and a passenger on the freight and the engineer on the commuter train were killed. The National Transportation Safety Board determined that the crash was caused by two dispatchers failing to properly communicate, resulting in the two trains being put on the same track (the second track was out of service due to construction).

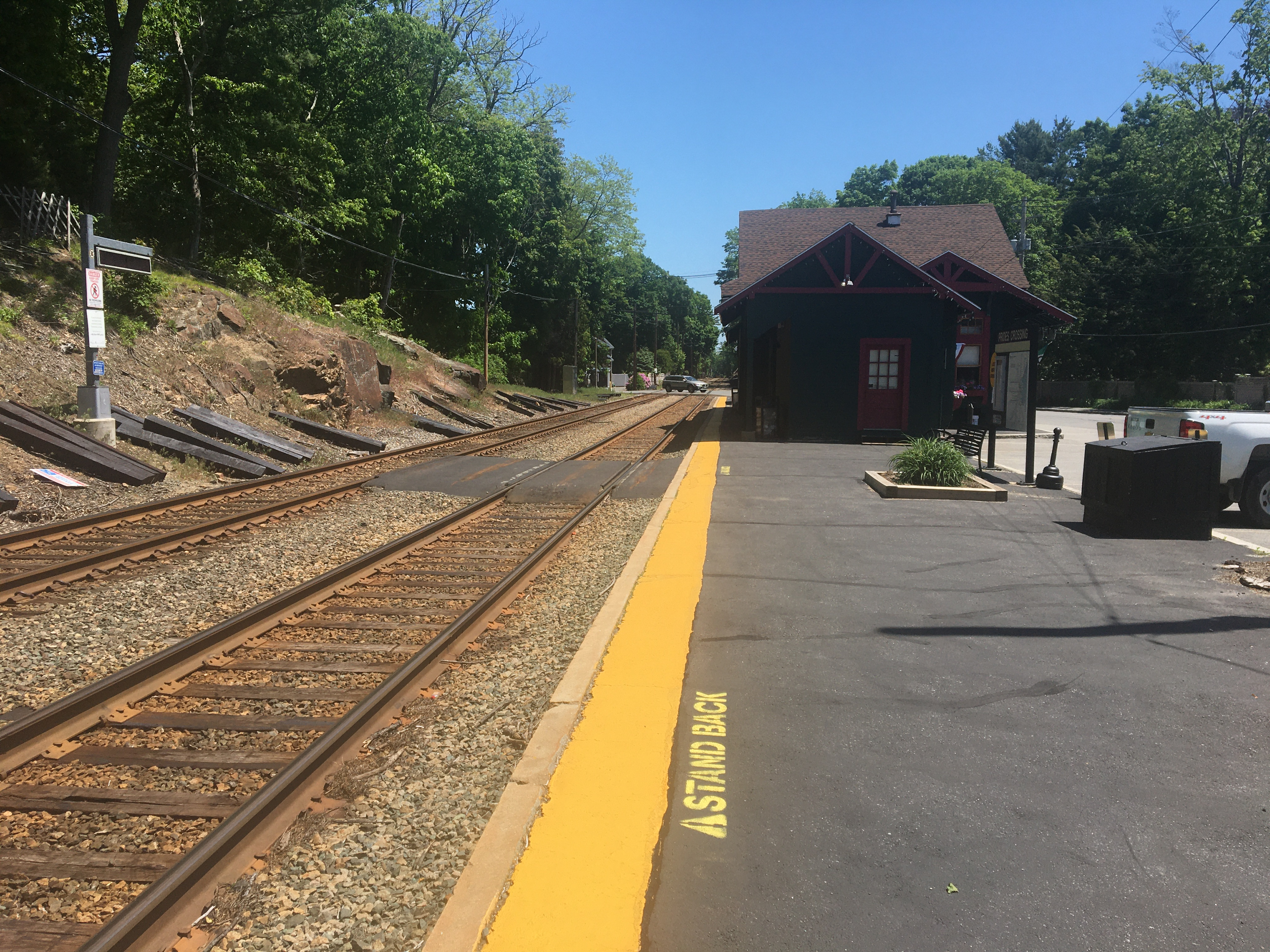
The station in 2020, shortly before closure

On January 20, 1984, the North Station approach trestles were destroyed by a fire. Gloucester Branch trains were terminated at a temporary station near Sullivan Square or bussed from Lynn. On November 16, 1984, the Beverly Draw bridge connecting Salem to Beverly burned, cutting off the Rockport Branch and the Ipswich Line from the rest of the system. (All lines running north and west from the Ipswich Line were abandoned by 1984, leaving no route to move equipment to the rest of the system.) A shuttle train was run from Rockport to Beverly Depot until January 7, 1985, when it was replaced by bus service. The locomotives used were then trucked to Danvers so they could be repaired at the MBTA's main maintenance facility. Most of the stations on the cut-off sections were upgraded with accessible mini-high platforms during the closure; due to its low ridership, Prides Crossing was not upgraded. A new bridge opened on December 1, 1985, reconnecting the lines to the larger system.

=== Closure ===
With just 15 daily boardings by a 2018 count, Prides Crossing was the third-lowest-ridership station on the MBTA Commuter Rail system, ahead of only Plimptonville station and Silver Hill station. By that time, the station was served by only three peak-hour inbound trips and five peak-hour outbound trips out of fifteen weekday round trips operated on the Gloucester Branch; weekend service did not stop at the station. In November 2020, as part of service cuts during the COVID-19 pandemic, the MBTA proposed to close Prides Crossing and five other low-ridership stations. Prides Crossing was nominated for closure because of its low ridership and lack of accessibility; the accessible Beverly Farms station is just 0.7 miles (1.1 km) to the east.

On December 14, reduced schedules went into effect due to limited employee availability. Based on the existing weekend service, these temporary schedules did not include service to Prides Crossing. That day, the MBTA Board voted to enact a more limited set of cuts, including indefinitely closing Prides Crossing and four of the other five stations. The closure of the five stations became indefinite effective April 5, 2021.
