= Massachusetts Route 128 =

State highway in Massachusetts, United States

Route 128
- Yankee Division Highway
- Route 128 highlighted in red

Route information
- Maintained by MassDOT
- Length: 57.5829 mi (92.6707 km)
- Existed: 1927–present

Major junctions
- South end: I-93 / US 1 / I-95 in Canton
- US 1 in Dedham; Route 9 in Wellesley; I-90 Toll / Mass Pike / Route 30 in Weston; US 20 in Waltham; Route 2 in Lexington; US 3 / Route 3A in Burlington; I-93 in Reading; US 1 in Lynnfield; I-95 in Peabody
- North end: Route 127A in Gloucester

Location
- Country: United States
- State: Massachusetts
- Counties: Norfolk, Middlesex, Essex

Highway system
- Massachusetts State Highway System; Interstate; US; State
← Route 127A	→ Route 128A

Route 128, known as the Yankee Division Highway, is an expressway in the U.S. state of Massachusetts maintained by the Highway Division of the Massachusetts Department of Transportation (MassDOT). Spanning 57 miles (92 km), it is the inner one of two beltways around Boston (the other being Interstate 495 [I-495]). The route's current southern terminus is at the junction of I-95 and I-93 in Canton, and it is concurrent with I-95 around Boston for 37.5 miles (60.4 km) before it leaves the interstate and continues on its own in a northeasterly direction towards Cape Ann. The northern terminus lies in Gloucester a few hundred feet from the Atlantic Ocean. All but the northernmost three miles (4.8 km) are a freeway, with the remainder being an expressway.

In local culture, Route 128 is generally recognized as the demarcation between the more urban inner suburbs and the less densely developed suburbs surrounding the city of Boston. It is furthermore used to reference the high-technology industry that developed from the 1960s to the 1980s in the suburban areas along the highway.

== Route description ==
=== Concurrency with I-95 (Canton–Peabody) ===
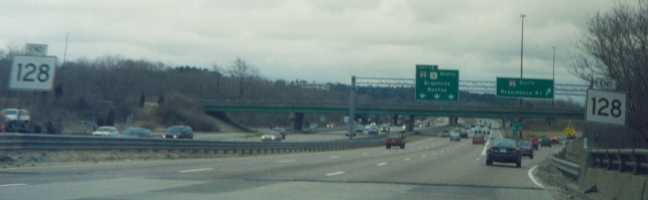
Since 1997, Route 128's southern end has been in Canton, where I-95 exits southwestward on its own roadbed, and I-93 north begins; US 1 north continues straight

Route 128 begins in the south in Norfolk County, at the interchange with I-93, I-95, and U.S. Route 1 (US 1) in Canton. It immediately begins as a freeway. Until the 1990s, its southern terminus was located at the junction of I-93, US 1, and Route 3 (the Braintree Split) in Braintree. At this present-day terminus, Route 128 runs concurrently with I-95, and follows the mileage-based exit numbering scheme used by I-95 as it enters Massachusetts from Pawtucket, Rhode Island. It also begins a wrong-way concurrency with US 1; as Route 128 and I-95 are signed traveling north, US 1 is signed traveling south, and vice versa. US 1 splits onto its own roadbed at exit 29 (old exit 15) in Dedham.

==== The decision to route Interstate 95 through Route 128 ====
In response to the outcome of the 1970 Boston Transportation Planning Review, Massachusetts focused federal highway funding on public mass transportation rather than building new highways through Boston and the inner suburbs ("inside of Route 128"), cancelling plans for completion of a Northeast Expressway and construction of a Southwest Expressway to carry I-95 through downtown Boston. This policy cascaded into designation of the segment of the Yankee Division Highway between the existing I-95 junction in Canton and the new I-95 junction in Peabody as I-95 rather than building a new highway to complete the connection, coupled with a decision to extend I-93 southward along the Central Artery and John Fitzgerald Expressway and onto the southern end of the Yankee Division Highway to the I-95 junction in Canton.

As a result of this political decision, about two thirds of Route 128 runs in tandem with I-95 from Canton north to Peabody, and after I-95 splits off and continues north from Peabody toward New Hampshire, Route 128 runs eastward on its own right-of-way from Peabody to Gloucester. The I-95 and I-93 signage were added in the mid-1970s when plans to construct I-95 through Boston, directly connecting the two I-95/Route 128 interchanges, were cancelled leaving a gap filled using Route 128. An unused cloverleaf in Canton, partially removed circa 1977, was one of the leftover structures from this plan as well as the existing expressway (part of US 1 since 1989).

The decision to reroute I-95 onto Route 128 rather than building a new highway inside of Route 128 has contributed to three significant problems.

- At the junction in Canton, I-95 northbound uses the original cloverleaf, which is fairly tight, to transition from the southern segment to the Yankee Division Highway. More than a few unsuspecting truckers have entered the cloverleaf at full highway speed and thus managed to flip over their rigs. As a result, the cloverleaf has been referred to as "Dead Man's Curve" to locals.
- The I-95 overhead traffic also has become a major contributor to congestion on the segment of the highway known as I-95.
- The Southeast Expressway, as the only highway coming into Boston from the south, carries more than double its capacity on a daily basis. The highway is prone to some of the worst traffic in the region, as all traffic from south of the city (coming from three different highways) must merge onto this one route.

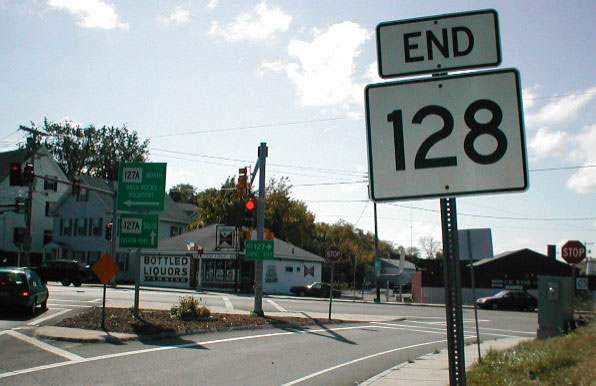
The north end of Route 128 is at Route 127A in Gloucester. The sign pointing Route 127A south straight is incorrect; it is actually to the right, where the sign points "ALT 127".

The political decision not to build new highways inside of Route 128 also led to abandonment of plans to extend the US 3 freeway from its current interchange with the Yankee Division Highway in Burlington to a junction with Route 2 in Lexington as originally planned. This decision caused a temporary reroute of US 3 onto the Yankee Division Highway, but in the opposite direction, to connect with its original route, one interchange to the north of the current junction, to become permanent.

A metropolitan planning organization for the Boston area studied the Route 128/I-95 Corridor from approximately 2005 to 2010. The study focused on the heavily congested section from I-90 (Newton) to US 3 (Burlington), and was completed in November 2010. As of 2010, the highway carried over 200,000 vehicles per day. Some possible improvements to Route 128 include HOV Lanes, reconstruction of shoulders, ramp metering, bus on shoulder, and fiber optic traffic system improvements. More studies will need to be completed before projects will begin.

=== Northern end (Peabody–Gloucester) ===
The segment of the highway that still carries the sole designation as Route 128, which is a four-lane freeway for most of its length, was not originally built as a freeway. Many junctions in this segment were constructed as signaled intersections at grade in the 1950s and subsequently reconstructed with grade separation and interchanges in the 1960s—often with local streets that happened to be in convenient locations doubling as ramps for access to the highway. However, four junctions nearest the northern end in the town of Gloucester were not improved. Proceeding in the direction signed as northward beyond exit 55 (old exit 12, the interchange with Crafts Road), the route runs eastward as a four-lane undivided expressway through two rotaries, named Grant Circle (intersection with Washington Street) and Blackburn Circle (intersection with Dory Road going northward and Schoolhouse Road going southward) and another intersection at Route 127 (Eastern Avenue) to its terminus in another intersection at Route 127A (East Main Street/Bass Avenue).

=== Exit numbers ===
After completion of the I-95/Route 128 interchange in Peabody in 1988, the State Highway Department changed the numbers of all exits south of the newly completed junction to those of the respective Interstate Highway designations. Since then, the highway has had three sets of exit numbers: I-93 exits 7–1 from the southern terminus to the I-95 junction in Canton, I-95 exits 26–64 (old exits 12–45) from the I-95 junction in Canton to the I-95 junction in Peabody, and Route 128 exits 37–55 (old exits 29–12) from the I-95 junction in Peabody to the northern terminus. The interchange with I-93 in Woburn, which was Route 128 exit 37 before the renumbering, became I-95 exit 37 (now exit 55) in the renumbering and thus coincidentally retained its number until the switchover with the mileage-based system in 2021. Along with other highways in the commonwealth, exits were renumbered with a mileage-based system in 2021.

== History ==
=== Original surface route ===
As designated in 1927, the original Route 128, called the "Circumferential Highway", followed existing roadways from Gloucester to Hull through Boston's suburbs along local roads, running from Route 138 in Milton around the west side of Boston to Route 107 (Essex Street or Bridge Street) in Salem. Its route was as follows:

Town/city	Streets
Milton	Milton Street
Boston	Neponset Valley Parkway, Milton Street
Dedham	Milton Street, High Street, Common Street, West Street
Needham	Dedham Avenue, Highland Avenue
Newton	Needham Street, Winchester Street, Centre Street, Walnut Street, Crafts Street, Waltham Street
Waltham	High Street, Newton Street, Main Street (US 20), Lexington Street
Lexington	Waltham Street, Massachusetts Avenue (Route 2A, current Route 4/Route 225), Woburn Street
Woburn	Lexington Street, Pleasant Street, Montvale Avenue
Stoneham	Montvale Avenue, Main Street (Route 28), Elm Street
Wakefield	Albion Street, North Avenue, Water Street, Vernon Street, New Salem Street, Salem Street
Lynnfield	Salem Street
Peabody	Lynnfield Street, Washington Street, Main Street
Salem	Boston Street

By 1928, it had been extended east to Quincy from its south end along the following streets, ending at the intersection of Route 3 and Route 3A (current Route 3A and Route 53):

Town	Streets
Quincy	Washington Street, Hancock Street, Adams Street
Milton	Adams Street, Centre Street, Canton Avenue, Dollar Lane

The first section of the new Circumferential Highway, in no way the freeway that it is now, was the piece from Route 9 in Wellesley around the south side of Boston to Route 3 (current Route 53) in Hingham. Parts of this were built as new roads, but most of it was along existing roads that were improved to handle the traffic. In 1931, the Massachusetts Department of Public Works acquired a right-of-way from Route 138 in Canton through Westwood, Dedham and Needham to Route 9 in Wellesley. This was mostly 80 feet (24 m) wide, only shrinking to 70 feet (21 m) in Needham, in the area of Great Plain Avenue and the Needham Line. Much of this was along new alignment, but about half—mostly in Needham—was along existing roads:

- Royall Street from west of Route 138 to east of Green Street (Canton)
- Green Lodge Street from Royall Street (cut off by Route 128) to Route 128 Station (Canton and Westwood)
- Greendale Avenue from Lyons Street and Common Street just south of the Charles River to Hunting Avenue (Dedham and Needham)
- Fremont Street north from Highland Avenue (Needham)
- Reservoir Street from Central Avenue to Route 9 (Needham and Wellesley)

From Route 138 in Canton east through the Blue Hills Reservation in Canton, Milton, Quincy and Braintree, Norfolk County acquired right-of-way in 1927 and built the Blue Hill River Road. This tied into West Street in northwest Braintree, which itself had been taken over by the county in 1923.

West Street led to Route 37, which ran southeast to Braintree center. This part of Route 37 had been taken over by the state in 1919 (to Braintree center) and 1917 (in Braintree center).

The rest of the new highway, from Route 37 east to Route 3 (now Route 53), through Braintree, Weymouth and Hingham, was taken over by the state in 1929. This was all along existing roads, except possibly the part of Park Avenue west of Route 18 in Weymouth.

By 1933, the whole Circumferential Highway had been completed, and, except for the piece from Route 9 in Wellesley south to Highland Avenue in Needham, was designated as Route 128. Former Route 128 along Highland Avenue into Needham center was left unnumbered (as was the Circumferential Highway north of Highland Avenue), but the rest of former Route 128, from Needham center east to Quincy, became part of Route 135. Thus the full route of the Circumferential Highway, as it existed by 1933, is now the following roads:

Town	Streets
Hingham	Derby Street (realigned during construction of Route 3, with two segments of original alignment becoming Old Derby Street)
Weymouth	Ralph Talbot Street, Park Avenue, Columbian Street
Braintree	Columbian Street, Grove Street, Washington Street (Route 37), Franklin Street (Route 37), West Street, Blue Hill River Road (now closed) (see Quincy)
Quincy	Blue Hill River Road (now closed; current highway uses its right-of-way)
Milton	Blue Hill River Road, Hillside Street
Canton	Blue Hill River Road, Royall Street, Green Lodge Street (cut by the Route 128/I-95 interchange)
Westwood	Blue Hill Drive (cut by Route 128 Station, and later upgraded on the spot as northbound Route 128)
Dedham and Westwood	upgraded on the spot as northbound Route 128 (under US 1) and then mostly in the median
Needham	Greendale Avenue, Hunting Road, southbound Route 128 under Highland Avenue, Reservoir Street
Wellesley	inside the present Route 9 interchange

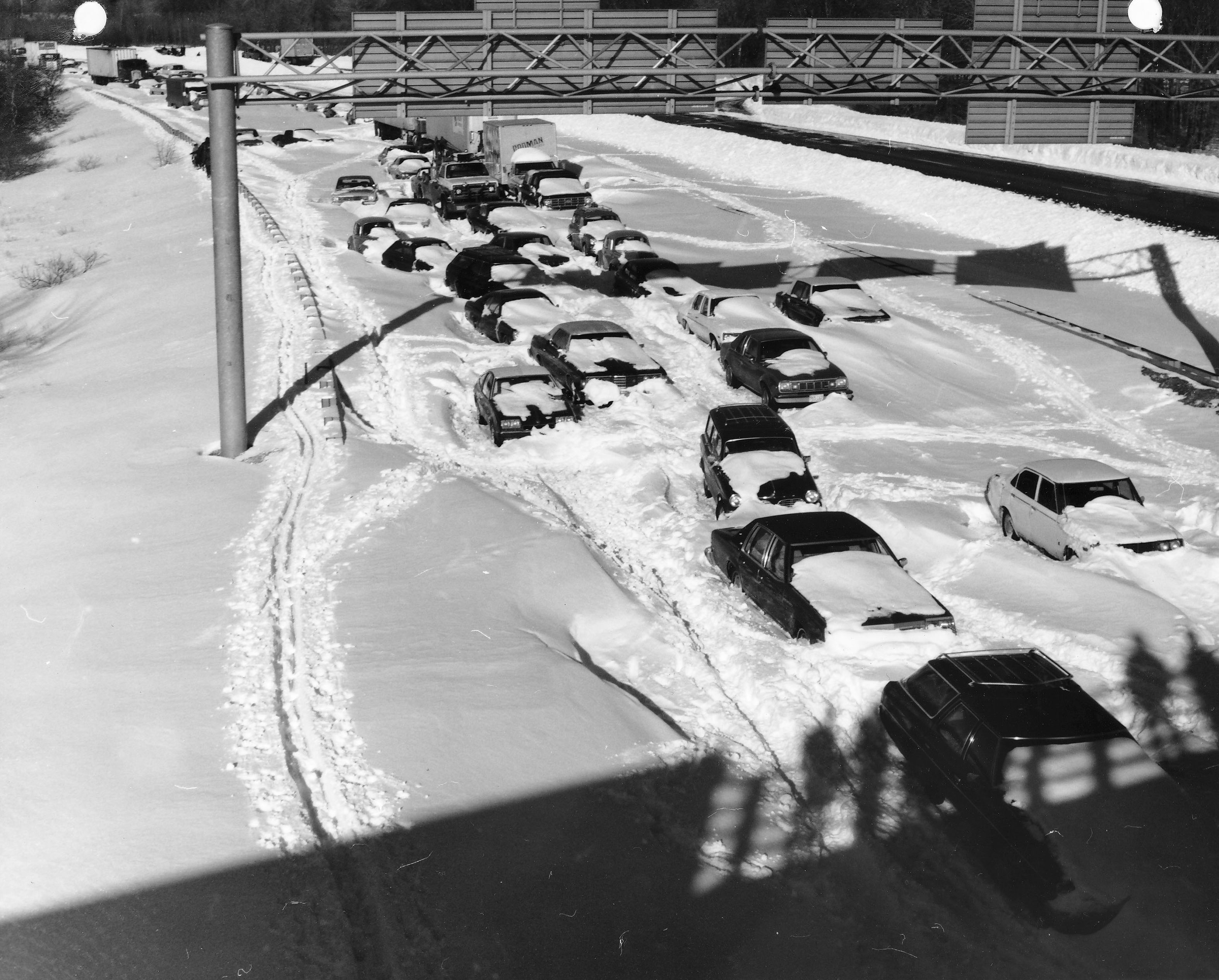
Cars stuck in snow on Route 128 near Needham, Massachusetts during the "Blizzard of '78"

At the same time as Route 128 was extended along the new Circumferential Highway, it was extended further into Hull. This alignment, not part of the Circumferential Highway, ran southeast on Route 3 (now Route 53) (Whiting Street) to the border of Hingham and Norwell, where it turned north on present Route 228 (Main Street) through Hingham and into Hull. The exact route through Hingham was Main Street, Short Street, Leavitt Street, East Street, and Hull Street. The end of the numbered route was at the south end of Nantasket Beach, where Nantasket Avenue curves northwest to follow the shore of Massachusetts Bay.

In 1941, the road was named the Yankee Division Highway in honor of the U.S. Army unit first formed in Boston in 1917.

=== Present freeway route ===
The first (northernmost) segment of the present freeway, which is still just four lanes wide, opened in 1951. Construction progressed southward. The final (southernmost) segment, originally built as the present eight-lane highway that spliced into the John Fitzgerald Expressway (then Route 3 for its entire length, and popularly also known as the Southeast Expressway) at a Y junction now known as the Braintree Split in Braintree. This segment, which opened in 1960, replaced a two-lane undivided road to complete the first circumferential highway around any major city.

Upon completion of the final segment of the Yankee Division Highway, the agency then known as the Massachusetts Highway Department (subsequently reorganized the Highway Division of the Massachusetts Department of Transportation) assigned the concurrent designation of Route 128 to the segment of the Southeast Expressway (Route 3) from exit 35 (old exit 14) to the Braintree Split (exit 42, old exit 19), linking to the segment of the original Route 128 from the intersection with Route 53 at Queen Anne's Corner at the Hingham–Norwell line to the southern terminus in Hull. That action removed the designation as Route 128 from Blue Hill River Road in Randolph and Braintree, which is now closed to traffic, and West Street, Franklin Street, segments of Washington Street and Plain Street, and Grove Street in Braintree, a segment of Columbian Street, Park Avenue, and a segment of Ralph Talbot Street in Weymouth, and Derby Street and a segment of Whiting Street (Route 53) in Hingham, all of which remain in service for local traffic. However, fate was not so kind to the rest of the original route. Although some segments of remain in service as local parallel streets, other segments became part of the present right of way, but with connections severed at both ends, and some segments were severed where they cross the present right of way and even closed if no longer used by local traffic. Thus, it is no longer feasible to drive the original route between Braintree and Gloucester.

In 1965, the Massachusetts Highway Department truncated Route 128 at the Braintree Split and redesignated the non-freeway section of Route 128 from Route 3 through Hingham and Hull as Route 228, with its direction reversed to reflect the actual geographical direction of that segment of the route. This action ended the concurrent route designation on the John Fitzgerald Expressway.

In the wake of the political decision not to complete the Northeast or Southwest Expressways to connect I-95 through Boston as originally planned, the United States Department of Transportation and the Massachusetts Highway Department redesignated the segment of the Yankee Division Highway between the junction with the completed segment of I-95 from Peabody to the New Hampshire border and the junction with the completed segment of I-95 from Canton to the Rhode Island border as I-95 to complete that highway. Concurrently, these agencies extended I-93 from its original terminus in Boston southward on the John Fitzgerald Expressway to the Braintree Split, then westward on the southern segment of the Yankee Division Highway to the junction with the completed southern segment of I-95 from Canton. At that time, the Massachusetts Highway Department officially truncated Route 128 at its intersection with I-95 in Peabody, began removal of Route 128 signage, and assigned I-93 and I-95 exit numbers to the interchanges on both affected segments of the Yankee Division Highway. The Massachusetts Highway Department subsequently restored the designation of Route 128 and reinstalled signage on the segment of the Yankee Division Highway designated as I-95, partly in response to public protest and partly due to the fact that an Amtrak and MBTA commuter rail station adjacent to the highway at the University Avenue interchange in Canton bears the name Route 128 (RTE on the railroad timetables and in the Amtrak reservation system). The station is located at the first interchange north of the junction of I-93 and I-95 in Canton.

Despite no longer officially carrying the designation, the section of the Yankee Division Highway between Braintree and Canton is popularly called Route 128 within Massachusetts. However, signage for Route 128 has gradually disappeared from the segment designated as I-95 as the Massachusetts Department of Transportation has replaced signage along that segment of the road and on the intersecting roads.

At its current southern terminus, Route 128 begins running concurrently with I-95 (same direction) and US 1 (opposite direction). While its concurrency with US 1 ends in Dedham, its concurrency with I-95 continues as it intersects with expressways including I-90 (the Massachusetts Turnpike) in Weston; US 20 in Waltham; Route 2 in Lexington; US 3 in Burlington (with which it runs concurrently within the town); and I-93 and US 1 again in Reading and Lynnfield, respectively. Route 128 and I-95 split in Peabody; as I-95 continues north towards New Hampshire, Route 128 travels east towards its northern terminus at an interchange with Route 127A in Gloucester.

==== Expansion and upgrade projects ====
By 1958, it became apparent that due to premature traffic congestion, the highway needed to be widened from four to six lanes, as business growth continued, often driven by technology out of Harvard University and MIT. This widening project was completed in 1964, and involved replacement of all existing overpasses with new ones.

In 1967, with the enaction of a policy that limited each road to one route number a decision was made to drop the designation of Route 128 from the Southeast Expressway and to redesignate the orphaned segment from exit 35 (old exit 14) of the Southeast Expressway to the terminus in Hull as Route 228—but with its designated directions reversed to reflect the actual geographical direction of the new route. This shifted the southern terminus of Route 128 to the Braintree Split.

With the designation of the part of the highway as I-95 in 1973, the need to upgrade it to Interstate Highway standards became apparent. By the 1980s, traffic levels had also increased on the section significantly due to the change. In 1988, this section was finally brought to Interstate standards, and the new interchanges with I-95 were finally completed.

In 1991, parts of the roadway had their shoulder converted into travel lanes at peak travel periods.

In late 2001, a project to resurface the road in Lexington and Burlington was completed.

Starting in 1998 and continuing through 2002, signs were replaced through a $1.1 million project between Reading and Lynnfield. Progress continued in 2005 and 2006 during a $2.2 million project which replaced the signs on from Peabody to Gloucester, and continued with a $1.4 million project in 2008 and 2009 that replaced signs in Peabody and the remaining ones in Lynnfield. A $2.9 million federal stimulus project helped replace exit and highway signs in 2010 and 2011 along Route 128/I-95 from US 3 in Lexington to I-93 in Reading.

A project begun in the fall of 2012 and completed in the fall of 2015 replaced exit and guide signs on Route 128/I-95 from Route 9 (exit 36, old exit 20) in Wellesley to Route 4/Route 225 (exit 49, old exit 31) in Lexington and, as part of the Add-A-Lane project discussed above, new signs were put up along a section of the I-95/Route 128 project completed in 2015 from Great Plain Avenue in Needham to Route 109 in Dedham. New signage was put up between I-95 and US 1 in 2010 and most of the signage between I-95 and Route 24 (on I-93/US 1) had been replaced by the end of 2011. Future projects would replace the signs on I-95 (south of Route 128) between the Rhode Island state line and the interchange with I-93, US 1, and Route 128 in Canton in 2018 and (along I-95/Route 128) between I-93 in Reading and US 1 in Peabody in 2019. New mileage markers were placed every 2/10 mile (0.32 km) of a mile along the highway in 2010 (except for the area covered by the widening project) for I-93 between Braintree and Canton and I-95/Route 128 from Canton to Peabody. New markers put along Route 128 (north of I-95) from Peabody to Gloucester reflect the state highway's total mileage from Canton, indicating MassDOT's change of heart in decommissioning the route where it shares the road with I-95. The previous mile markers (reflected in the exit list below) had mile 0 in Peabody.

During the 1960s reconstruction of Route 128, a provision had been made for a fourth lane within the widely spaced median along the 1.5-mile (2.4 km) length of Route 128 running from just north of the US 1 interchange in Dedham, Massachusetts, northwestwards to the Route 109 interchange, and this would finally be used for the Add-A-Lane project. The $315 million MassDOT Highway Division project has widened the existing 14.3-mile (23.0 km) six-lane section of highway to eight lanes from north of Route 9 in Wellesley to Route 24 in Randolph. The project consists of adding a lane on the inside of each carriageway, complete with a 10-foot (3.0 m) inside shoulder. The existing 1950s bridges, 22 in total, also were replaced. The project also included construction of a new two-lane ramp from Route 128 to I-95 in Canton and installation of a new interchange at Kendrick Street in Needham, designated as exit 35A (old exit 19A) with the ramps to Highland Avenue become exits 35B and 35C (old exits 19B and 19C). Construction on phase 1 was officially completed in October 2009. Construction of phase 2 of the project began in summer 2006. This phase of the project consisted of the replacement of the Route 1 and Route 1A bridges over Route 128 in Dedham along with the road widening between exits 27 and 29 (old exits 13 and 15, US 1). Construction of four sound barriers between the US 1 and I-95 interchanges were also included. This phase was completed in the spring of 2011. Construction on phase 3, begun in April 2009, widened I-93/US 1 to four lanes in each direction from Route 24 to the I-95 interchange. Phase 4 of the project, which began in March 2011, is replacing seven bridges and widens Route 128 (I-95) to four lanes in each direction from Route 109 to south of Highland Avenue in Needham. The southeastern freeway (Pilgrims Highway) that extends from Braintree to Cape Cod, Route 3, is also in the process of undergoing a similar "add-a-lane" project for much of its own 42-mile (68 km) length. Construction on the sixth and final segment in Needham and Wellesley began in January 2015, and included wider bridges and more auxiliary lanes and a new collector road. Major road construction ended in October 2018, and the project wrapped up with painting and landscaping in the spring of 2019.

== Economic and cultural impact ==
The area along Route 128 is home to a number of high-technology firms and corporations. In 1955, Business Week ran an article titled "New England Highway Upsets Old Way of Life" and referred to Route 128 as "the Magic Semicircle". In 1957, there were 99 companies employing 17,000 workers along Route 128; in 1965, 574; in 1973, 1,212. The development of college-like suburban campuses and marketing to technology companies was intentional on the part of real estate developers such as Gerald W. Blakeley Jr.

In the 1980s, the area was often compared to California's Silicon Valley, and the positive effects of this growth on the Massachusetts economy were dubbed the "Massachusetts Miracle". The western part of Route 128 was officially named "America's Technology Highway" in October 1982. Two years later, those blue signs were changed to read "America's Technology Region" after complaints from veterans groups that noted the highway already had the Yankee Division Highway designation.

In 2002, American mathematician Robert P. C. de Marrais named the routons (also known as the centumduodetrigintanions, 128-ions, or 128-nions), or the 128-dimensional hypercomplex numbers, after Route 128.

For completeness’ sake, we name the 2^{7}-ions too, dubbing them Routons, after that legendary source of high-tech innovativeness, Route 128 of the “Massachusetts Miracle” that paralleled Silicon Valley’s on the “Left Coast” of this country.

== Exit list ==
County	Location	mi	km	Old exit	New exit	Destinations	Notes
Norfolk	Canton	0.0	0.0	12	26	I-93 north / US 1 north to Route 3 – Boston I-95 south – Providence, RI	Southern terminus; southern terminus of I-93; southern end of I-95/US 1 concurrency
Norfolk	Dedham	0.6	0.97	13	27	University Avenue – MBTA / Amtrak Station	
Norfolk	Westwood	1.9	3.1	14	28	East Street / Canton Street	
Norfolk	Dedham	2.6	4.2	15	29	US 1 south to Route 1A – Dedham, Norwood	Northern end of US 1 concurrency; signed as exits 29A (Route 1A) and 29B (US 1)
Norfolk	Dedham	4.1	6.6	16	31	Route 109 – Dedham, Westwood	Signed as exits 31A (east) and 31B (west)
Norfolk	Dedham	5.6	9.0	17	32	Route 135 west – Needham, Dedham	Eastern terminus of Route 135
Norfolk	Needham	6.0	9.7	18	33	Great Plain Avenue – West Roxbury	
Norfolk	Needham	8.2	13.2	19A	35A	Kendrick Street – Needham	
Norfolk	Needham	8.8	14.2	19	35	Highland Avenue – Newton Highlands, Needham	Signed as exits 35B (east) and 35C (west)
Norfolk	Wellesley	9.9	15.9	20	36	Route 9 – Brookline, Boston, Framingham, Worcester	Signed as exits 36A (east) and 36B (west)
Middlesex	Newton	11.2	18.0	21	37	Route 16 – Newton, Wellesley	Signed as exits 37A (east) and 37B (west) southbound
Middlesex	Newton	11.6	18.7	22	38	Grove Street – MBTA Station	
Middlesex	Weston	12.0	19.3	23	—	Recreation Road	Northbound exit and entrance
Middlesex	Weston	12.3– 12.5	19.8– 20.1	25	39B	I-90 Toll / Mass Pike – Boston, Albany, NY	Exit 123A on I-90 / Mass Pike
Middlesex	Weston	12.3– 12.5	19.8– 20.1	24	39A	Route 30 – Newton, Weston	
Middlesex	Waltham	14.5	23.3	26	41	US 20 – Waltham, Weston	To Route 117
Middlesex	Waltham	16.3	26.2	27	43	Third Avenue / Totten Pond Road / Winter Street	Signed as exits 43A (Totten Pond/Third) and 43B (Winter) southbound; no northbound access to Totten Pond/Winter
Middlesex	Waltham			27	43	To Totten Pond Road / Winter Street	Northbound exit only; access via Wyman Street
Middlesex	Waltham	17.6	28.3	28	44	Trapelo Road – Belmont, Lincoln	Signed as exits 44A (east) and 44B (west) northbound
Middlesex	Lexington	18.5	29.8	29	45	Route 2 – Cambridge, Boston, Acton, Fitchburg	Signed as exits 45A (east) and 45B (west); exits 127A-B on Route 2
Middlesex	Lexington	19.6	31.5	30	46	Route 2A – East Lexington, Concord	Signed as exits 46A (east) and 46B (west); to Hanscom Field
Middlesex	Lexington	21.8	35.1	31	49	Route 4 / Route 225 – Lexington, Bedford	Signed as exits 49A (south/east) and 49B (north/west)
Middlesex	Burlington	23.1	37.2	32A	50A	US 3 north – Lowell, Nashua, NH	Southern end of US 3 concurrency; exit 72B on US 3
Middlesex	Burlington	23.4	37.7	32B	50B	Middlesex Turnpike – Burlington	
Middlesex	Burlington	24.8	39.9	33	51	US 3 south / Route 3A north – Winchester, Burlington	Northern end of US 3 concurrency; southern terminus of Route 3A; signed as exits 51A (south) and 51B (north)
Middlesex	Burlington	25.7	41.4	34	52	Winn Street – Woburn, Burlington	
Middlesex	Woburn	26.8	43.1	35	53	Route 38 – Woburn, Wilmington	
Middlesex	Woburn	28.4	45.7	36	54	Washington Street – Woburn, Reading	
Middlesex	Reading	28.8	46.3	37	55	I-93 – Boston, Concord, NH	Signed as exits 55A (south) and 55B (north); exits 28A-B on I-93
Middlesex	Reading	29.6	47.6	38	56	Route 28 – Stoneham, Reading	Signed as exits 56A (south) and 56B (north)
Middlesex	Wakefield	30.8	49.6	39	57	North Avenue – Reading, Wakefield	
Middlesex	Wakefield	31.6	50.9	40	58	Route 129 – Wakefield Center, Wilmington	
Essex	Lynnfield	32.3	52.0	41	59	Main Street – Lynnfield Center, Wakefield	
Middlesex	Wakefield	33.9	54.6	42	60	Salem Street – Wakefield	
Essex	Lynnfield	34.5	55.5	43	61	Walnut Street – Saugus, Lynnfield	
Essex	Lynnfield			44	63	US 1 / Route 129 – Boston	Northbound exit only
Essex	Peabody	35.9	57.8	44B	63B	To US 1 / Route 129 – Danvers, Boston, Lynn	Signed as exit 63 southbound; no southbound access to Route 129; signed for Boston southbound, Lynn northbound
Essex	Peabody	37.5	60.4	45 (NB); 29 (SB)	64 (NB); 37 (SB)	I-95 north – Portsmouth, NH	Northern end of I-95 concurrency
Essex	Peabody	38.4	61.8	28	38	Forest Street / Centennial Drive	
Essex	Peabody	39.0	62.8	26	39	Lowell Street – Peabody Square, Salem	
Essex	Peabody	39.7	63.9	25	40	Route 114 / Lowell Street – Salem, Middleton, Marblehead, West Peabody	Signed as exits 40A (Route 114 east/Lowell) and 40B (Route 114 west); Lowell Street not signed southbound
Essex	Danvers	40.4	65.0	24	41	Endicott Street	
Essex	Danvers	41.2	66.3	23	42	Route 35 – Salem, Danvers	
Essex	Danvers	41.8	67.3	22	43	Route 62 – Beverly, Middleton	
Essex	Danvers	42.5	68.4	21	44	Trask Lane – Folly Hill	Northbound exit and entrance
Essex	Danvers	42.5	68.4	21	44	Conant Street – Industrial Park	Southbound exit and entrance
Essex	Beverly	43.5	70.0	20	45	Route 1A – Beverly, Hamilton	Signed as exits 45A (south) and 45B (north)
Essex	Beverly	44.2	71.1	19	46	Sohier Road / Brimbal Avenue – Montserrat, North Beverly	Sohier Road not signed southbound
Essex	Beverly	45.3	72.9	18	47	Route 22 – Essex, Beverly	
Essex	Wenham	47.4	76.3	17	48	Grapevine Road – Beverly Farms, Wenham	
Essex	Manchester	48.9	78.7	16	49	Pine Street – Manchester, Magnolia	
Essex	Manchester	50.4	81.1	15	50	School Street – Essex, Manchester	
Essex	Gloucester	53.5	86.1	14	53	Route 133 – West Gloucester, Essex	
Essex	Gloucester	54.2	87.2	13	54	Concord Street – Wingaersheek Beach	
Essex	Gloucester	54.8	88.2	12	55	Crafts Road – Rust Island	Access via Rust Island Road
Essex	Gloucester	56.0	90.1	Northern end of freeway section			
Essex	Gloucester	56.0	90.1	11	—	Route 127 south (Washington Street) – Gloucester, Annisquam	Grant Circle; northern terminus of Route 127
Essex	Gloucester	56.8	91.4	—	—	Dory Road / Gloucester School Road	Blackburn Circle
Essex	Gloucester	57.6	92.7	10	—	Route 127 (Eastern Avenue) – Manchester, Rockport	At-grade intersection
Essex	Gloucester	57.8	93.0	9	—	Route 127A – Rockport, Bass Rocks, Eastern Point	Northern terminus; at-grade intersection
1.000 mi = 1.609 km; 1.000 km = 0.621 mi: Closed/former; Concurrency terminus; Electronic toll collection; Incomplete access

== Bibliography ==
- Earls, Alan R. (2002). Route 128 and the Birth of the Age of High Tech. Arcadia Publishing. ISBN 9780738510767.
- Rosegrant, Susan; Lampe, David R. (1992). Route 128: Lessons from Boston's High-Tech Community. Basic Books. ISBN 0465046398. The story of the Boston high-tech industry, starting from its 19th-century roots.
- Saxenian, AnnaLee (1994). Regional Advantage: Culture and Competition in Silicon Valley and Route 128. Harvard University Press. ISBN 9780674753396.
- Tsipis, Yanni; Kruh, David (2003). Building Route 128. Arcadia Publishing. ISBN 9780738511634.
