= Prides Crossing (disambiguation) =

Prides Crossing is a neighborhood of Beverly, Massachusetts, U.S.

Prides Crossing or Pride's Crossing may also refer to:

- Prides Crossing station, a railroad station in the above noted neighborhood
- Pride's Crossing, a 1997 play by Tina Howe
- Pride's Crossing, a 1950 play by Victor Wolfson
