= Beverly Farms station =

Railway station in Beverly, Massachusetts, US

Beverly Farms
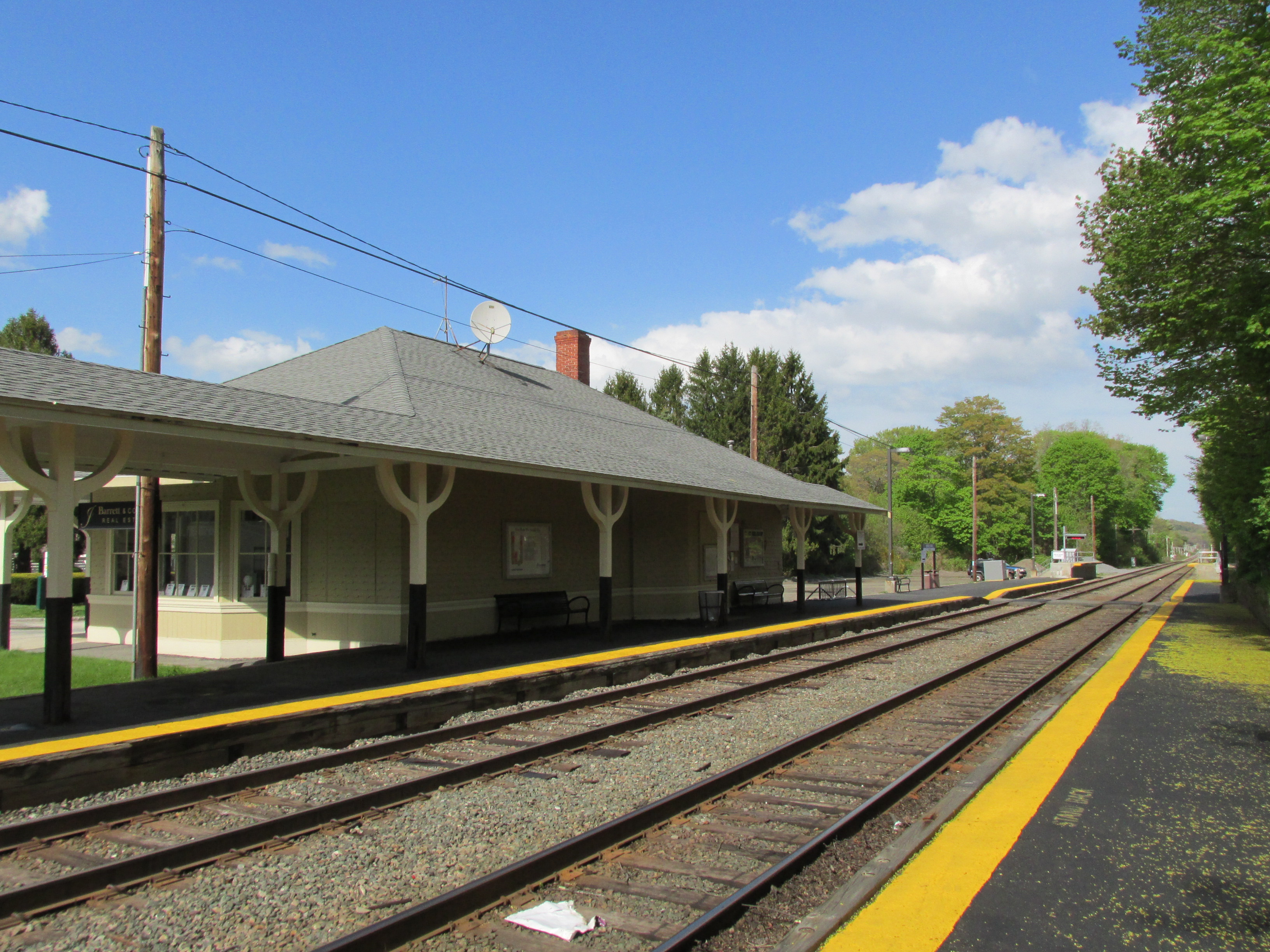
- Beverly Farms station in 2013

General information
- Location: 1 Oak Street; Beverly, Massachusetts
- Coordinates: 42.56175°N 70.81130°W
- Line: Gloucester Branch
- Platforms: 2 side platforms
- Tracks: 2

Construction
- Parking: 25 spaces
- Cycle facilities: 7 spaces
- Accessible: Yes

Other information
- Fare zone: 5

History
- Opened: 1847
- Rebuilt: c. 1879, 1898

Passengers
- 2024: 83 daily boardings

Services
Preceding station	MBTA	Following station
Montserrat toward North Station	Newburyport/Rockport Line	Manchester toward Rockport
Location

Beverly Farms station is an MBTA Commuter Rail station in the Beverly Farms village of Beverly, Massachusetts. Located at the intersection of Oak Street and West Street, it serves the Newburyport/Rockport Line. The 1898-built station building is still present but no longer used for railroad purposes. The station has two side platforms serving the line's two tracks, each with a mini-high section to make the station accessible.

== History ==
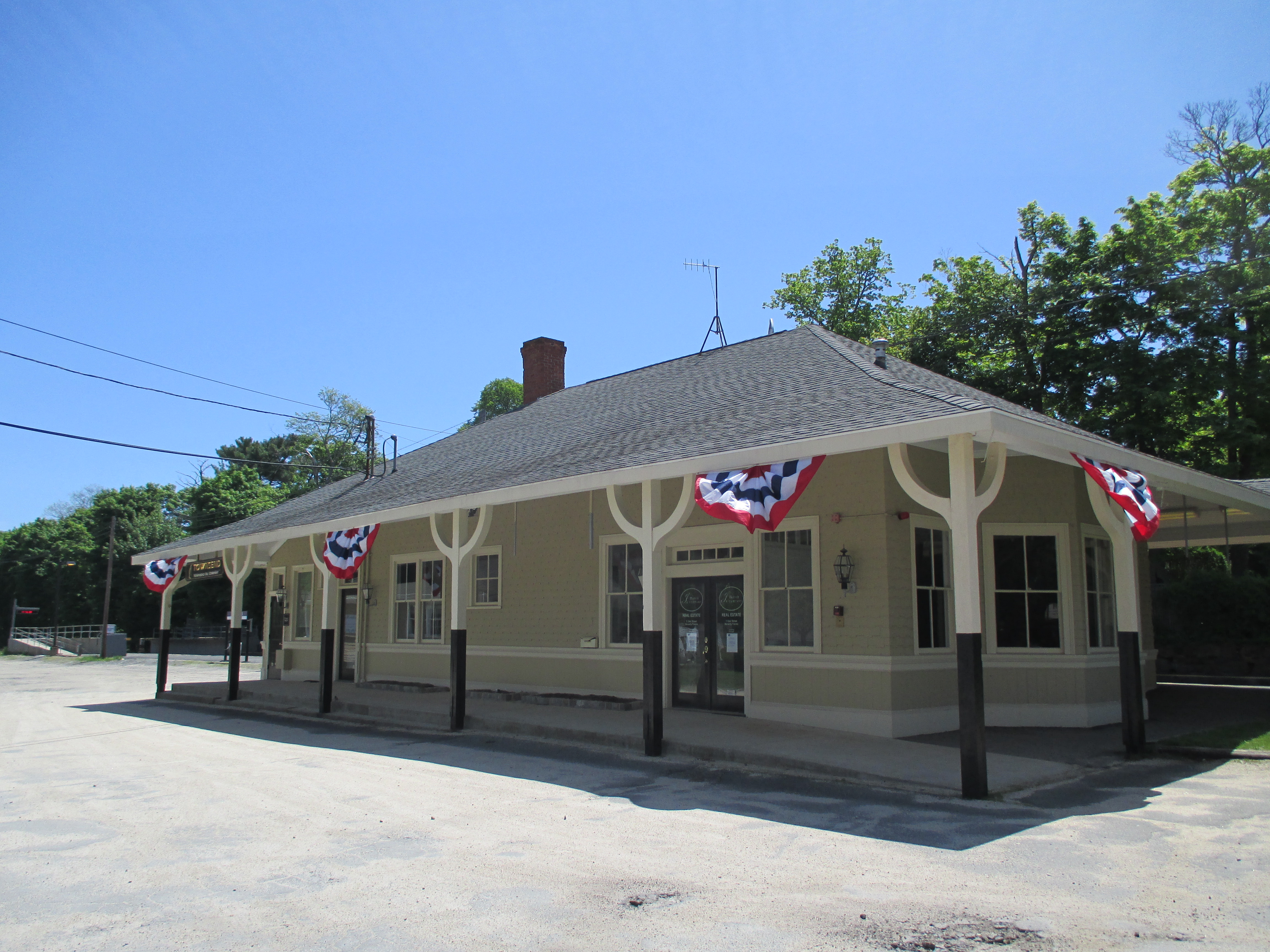
The station building in 2013

The Eastern Railroad opened its Gloucester Branch to Manchester on August 3, 1847, and to Gloucester on December 1. An intermediate station was located at West Beach (West Street at Hale Street). It was a flag stop established by Eastern Railroad president David A. Neal, an early resident of the village of Beverly Farms.

Around 1879, West Beach station was replaced with Beverly Farms station, located 0.4 miles (0.6 km) to the west adjacent to the village center. In 1898, the Boston and Maine Railroad replaced it with a larger hip-roofed depot.

The ticket office in the station building closed on February 22, 1952. The freight house was demolished the year after. The station building was closed in 1958 and renovated for commercial use. A group of friends paid $8,000 for the building and spent $22,000 to convert it for use as a country store. A travel agency began using the space in 1962. It was used as a country store by 1977.
