= Montserrat station =

Railway station in Massachusetts

Montserrat
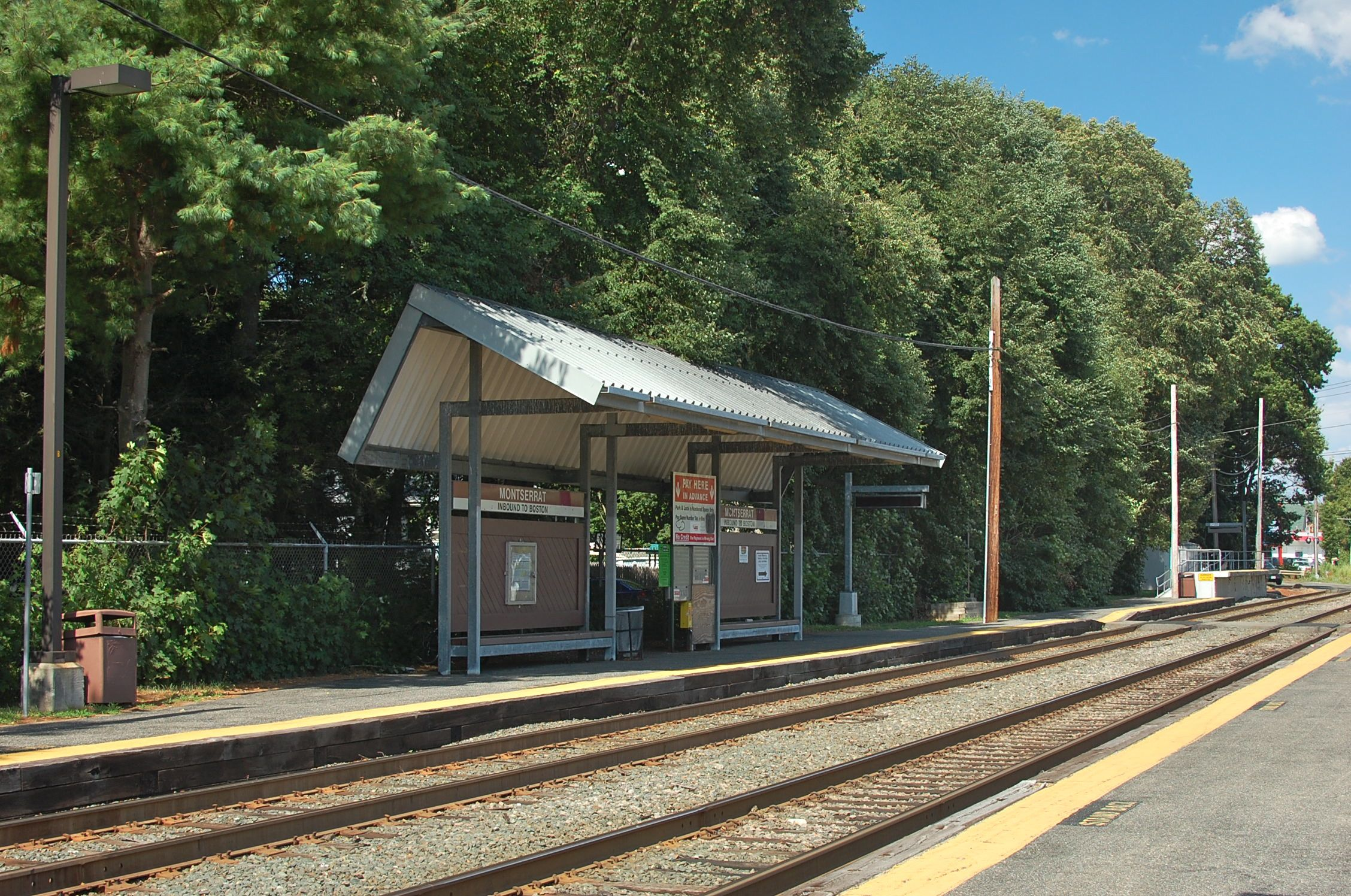
- Montserrat station in 2010

General information
- Location: 180 Essex Street (Route 22); Beverly, Massachusetts
- Coordinates: 42.56215°N 70.86930°W
- Line: Gloucester Branch
- Platforms: 2 side platforms
- Tracks: 2

Construction
- Parking: 117 spaces
- Cycle facilities: 7 spaces
- Accessible: yes

Other information
- Fare zone: 4

History
- Opened: 1874

Passengers
- 2024: 185 daily boardings

Services
Preceding station	MBTA	Following station
Beverly toward North Station	Newburyport/Rockport Line	Beverly Farms toward Rockport
Location

Montserrat station is an MBTA Commuter Rail Newburyport/Rockport Line station located in Beverly, Massachusetts. Located between Spring Street and Essex Street (MA-22), it serves the central part of Beverly and as a park-and-ride station for the North Shore, with easy access from Route 128. Montserrat station has mini-high platforms serving each track, making it accessible.

== History ==
The station originally opened in 1874. The ticket office in the station building closed on February 22, 1952, and the station building was demolished by 1977.
