= Ipswich (CDP), Massachusetts =

Ipswich, Massachusetts
- Census-designated place
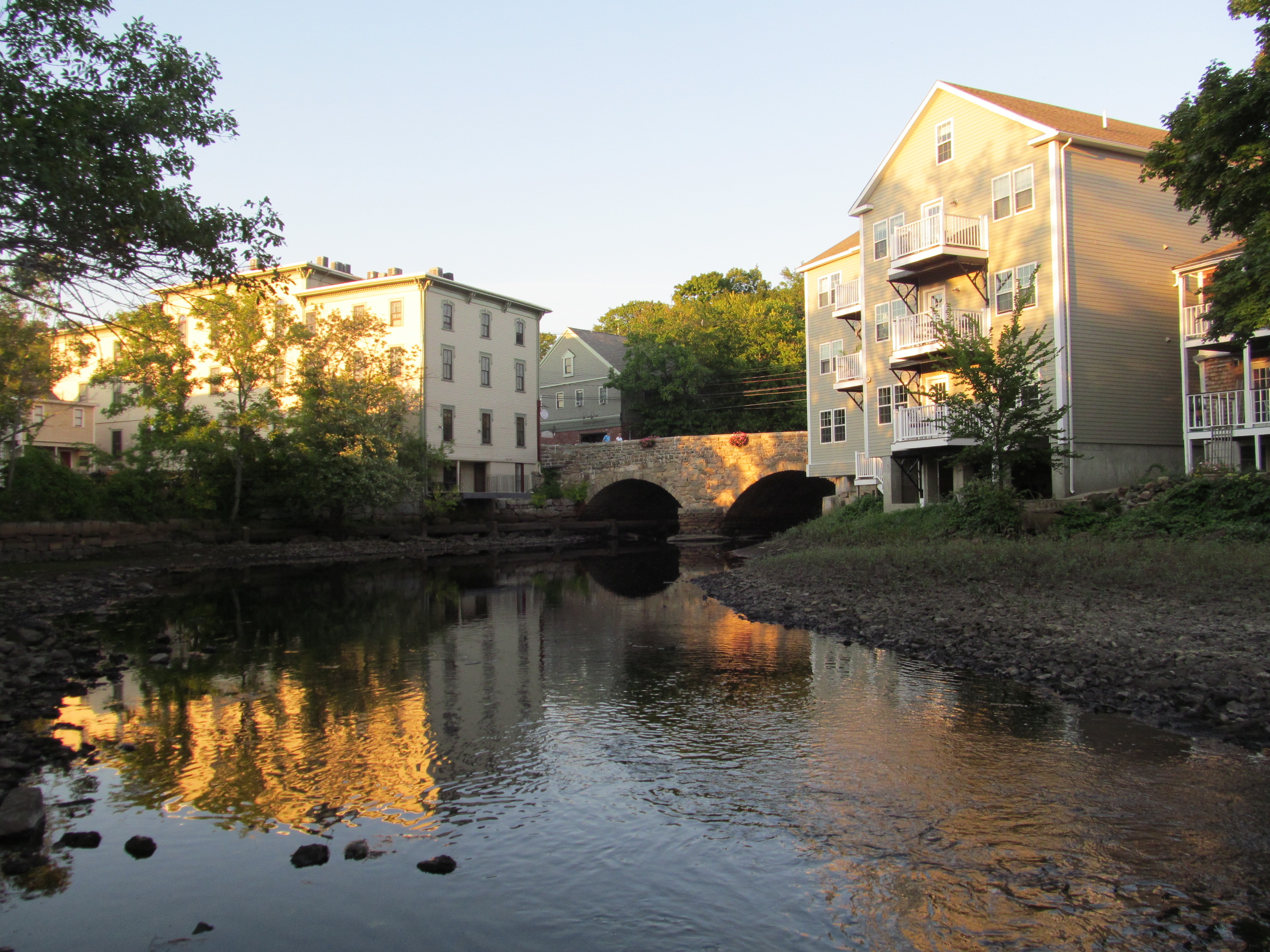
- Choate Bridge

- Location in Essex County and the state of Massachusetts.
- Coordinates: 42°40′46″N 70°50′16″W
- Country: United States
- State: Massachusetts
- County: Essex
- Town: Ipswich

Area
  - Total: 1.74 sq mi (4.51 km^{2})
  - Land: 1.64 sq mi (4.25 km^{2})
  - Water: 0.10 sq mi (0.27 km^{2})
- Elevation: 26 ft (8 m)

Population (2020)
  - Total: 4,370
  - Density: 2,665.7/sq mi (1,029.23/km^{2})
- Time zone: UTC-5 (Eastern (EST))
  - Summer (DST): UTC-4 (EDT)
- ZIP code: 01938
- Area code: 978
- FIPS code: 25-32275
- GNIS feature ID: 0614554

Ipswich is a census-designated place (CDP) located in the town of Ipswich in Essex County, Massachusetts, United States. The population was 4,222 at the 2010 census.

== Geography ==
According to the United States Census Bureau, the CDP has a total area of 1.75 square miles (4.52 km^{2}), of which 1.64 square miles (4.25 km^{2}) is land and 0.10 square miles (0.26 km^{2}) (5.80%) is water.

== Demographics ==
Historical population
Census	Pop.	Note	%±
2020	4,370		—
U.S. Decennial Census

As of the census of 2000, there were 4,161 people, 1,841 households, and 994 families residing in the CDP. The population density was 967.8 people/km^{2} (2,507 people/mi^{2}). There were 1,923 housing units at an average density of 447.3 units per square kilometre (1,159 inits/mi^{2}). The racial makeup of the CDP was 96.78% White, 0.38% African American, 0.14% Native American, 0.99% Asian, 0.55% from other races, and 1.15% from two or more races. Hispanic or Latino of any race were 1.11% of the population.

There were 1,841 households, out of which 28.0% had children under the age of 18 living with them, 39.7% were married couples living together, 10.8% have a woman whose husband does not live with her, and 46.0% were non-families. 38.0% of all households were made up of individuals, and 14.7% had someone living alone who was 65 years of age or older. The average household size was 2.23 and the average family size was 3.01.

In the CDP, the population was spread out, with 22.2% under the age of 18, 6.3% from 18 to 24, 32.8% from 25 to 44, 22.7% from 45 to 64, and 16.1% who were 65 years of age or older. The median age was 39 years. For every 100 females, there were 88.8 males. For every 100 females age 18 and over, there were 84.5 males.

The median income for a household in the CDP was $40,482, and the median income for a family was $56,803. Males had a median income of $39,148 versus $33,036 for females. The per capita income for the CDP was $23,954. About 7.1% of families and 11.0% of the population were below the poverty line, including 16.9% of those under the age of 18 and 10.0% ages 65 or older.
