= Topsfield (CDP), Massachusetts =

Topsfield, Massachusetts
- Census-designated place
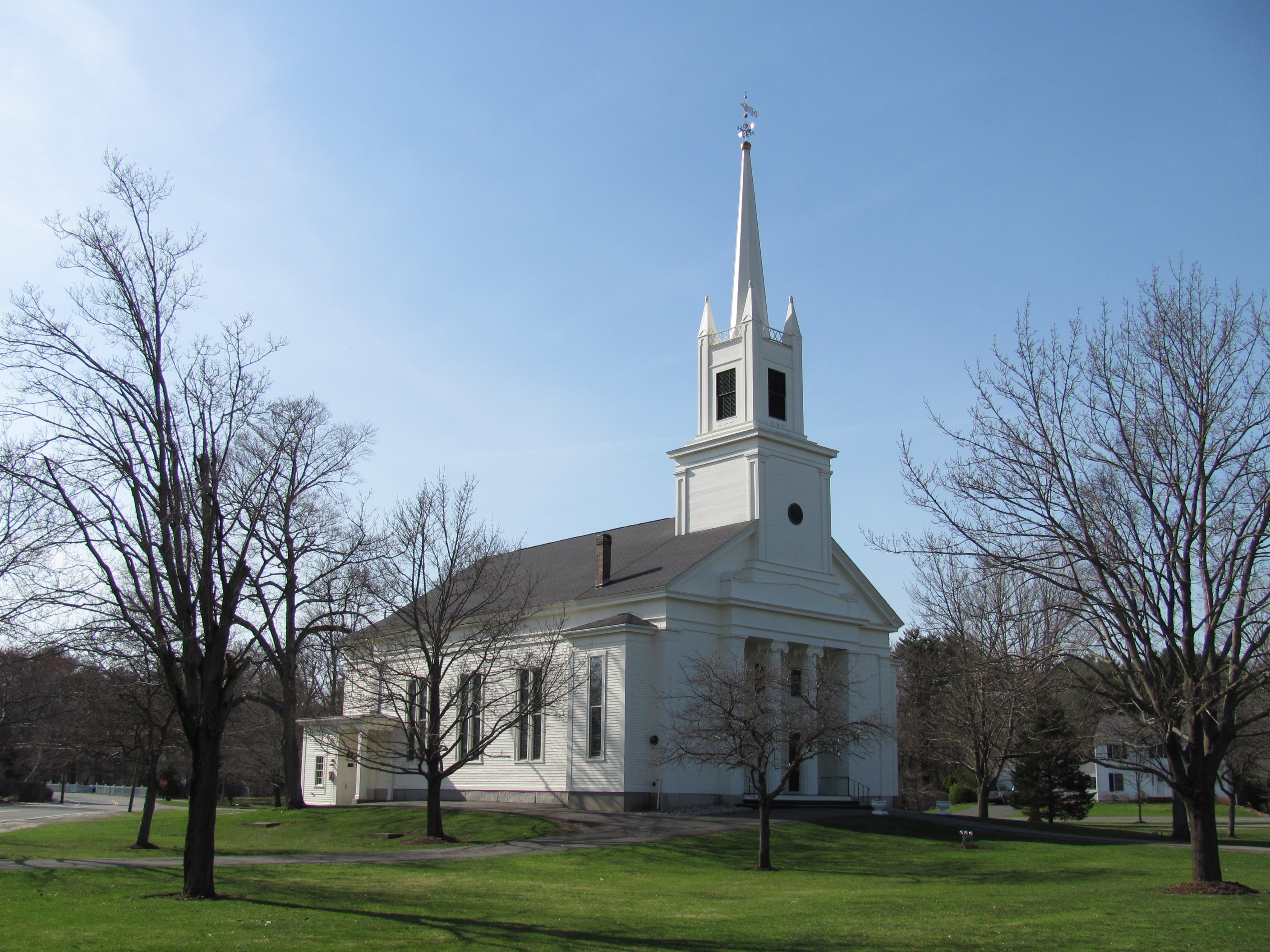
- Congregational Church

- Location in Essex County and the state of Massachusetts.
- Coordinates: 42°38′21″N 70°57′19″W
- Country: United States
- State: Massachusetts
- County: Essex
- Town: Topsfield

Area
  - Total: 2.75 sq mi (7.11 km^{2})
  - Land: 2.71 sq mi (7.01 km^{2})
  - Water: 0.039 sq mi (0.10 km^{2})
- Elevation: 59 ft (18 m)

Population (2020)
  - Total: 2,864
  - Density: 1,057.9/sq mi (408.46/km^{2})
- Time zone: UTC-5 (Eastern (EST))
  - Summer (DST): UTC-4 (EDT)
- ZIP code: 01983
- Area code: 978
- FIPS code: 25-70115
- GNIS feature ID: 0614354

Topsfield is a census-designated place (CDP) in the town of Topsfield in Essex County, Massachusetts, United States. The population was 2,717 at the 2010 census.

== Geography ==
According to the United States Census Bureau, the CDP has a total area of 2.7 square miles (7.1 km^{2}), of which 2.7 square miles (7.0 km^{2}) is land and 0.04 square miles (0.1 km^{2}), or 1.41%, is water.

== Demographics ==
Historical population
Census	Pop.	Note	%±
2020	2,864		—
U.S. Decennial Census

At the 2000 census, there were 2,826 people, 1,016 households and 765 families residing in the CDP. The population density was 395.3 people/km^{2} (1,024 people/mi^{2}). There were 1,042 housing units at an average density of 145.8 units per square kilometre (378 units/mi^{2}). The racial makeup of the CDP was 98.16% White, 0.11% African American, 0.07% Native American, 0.57% Asian, 0.00% Pacific Islander, 0.42% from other races, and 0.67% from two or more races. 0.85% of the population were Hispanic or Latino of any race.

There were 1,016 households, of which 36.8% had children under the age of 18 living with them, 66.1% were married couples living together, 7.3% have a woman whose husband does not live with her, and 24.7% were non-families. 22.6% of all households were made up of individuals, and 14.4% had someone living alone who was 65 years of age or older. The average household size was 2.69 and the average family size was 3.18.

27.0% of the population were under the age of 18, 4.5% from 18 to 24, 24.1% from 25 to 44, 25.1% from 45 to 64, and 19.2% who were 65 years of age or older. The median age was 42 years. For every 100 females, there were 88.7 males. For every 100 females age 18 and over, there were 83.5 males.

The median household income was $84,898 and the median family income was $99,462. Males had a median income of $63,194 and females $43,843. The per capita income was $34,953. None of the families and 2.2% of the population were below the poverty line, including 0.0% under the age of 18 and 6.1% ages 65 or older.
