= Essex (CDP), Massachusetts =

Essex, Massachusetts
- Census-designated place
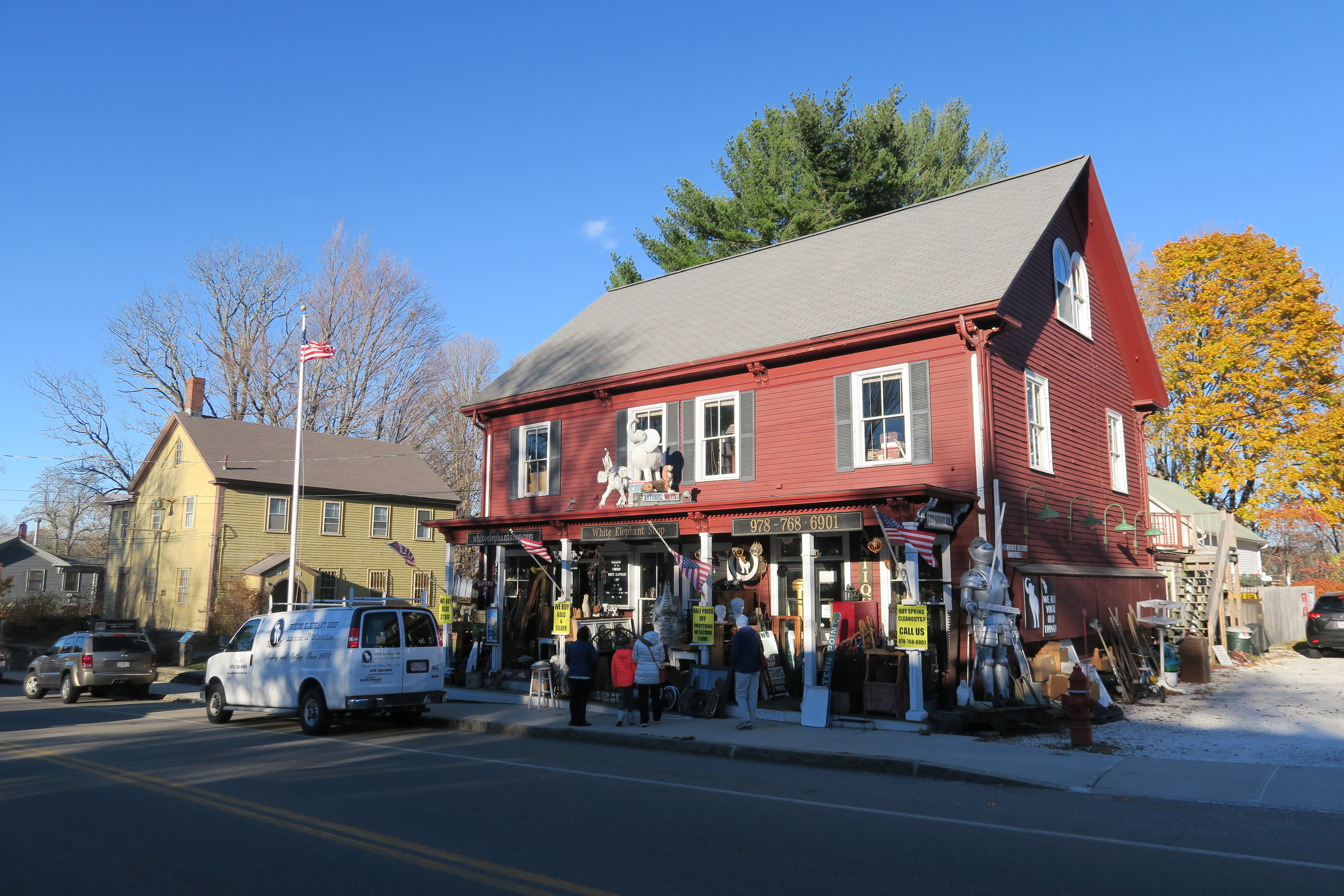
- White Elephant Shop

- Location in Essex County and the state of Massachusetts.
- Coordinates: 42°37′54″N 70°46′45″W
- Country: United States
- State: Massachusetts
- County: Essex
- Town: Essex

Area
  - Total: 2.24 sq mi (5.79 km^{2})
  - Land: 2.06 sq mi (5.33 km^{2})
  - Water: 0.18 sq mi (0.46 km^{2})
- Elevation: 23 ft (7 m)

Population (2020)
  - Total: 1,517
  - Density: 737/sq mi (284.5/km^{2})
- Time zone: UTC-5 (Eastern (EST))
  - Summer (DST): UTC-4 (EDT)
- ZIP code: 01929
- Area code: 978
- FIPS code: 25-21815
- GNIS feature ID: 0614536

Essex CDP is a census-designated place (CDP) in the town of Essex in Essex County, Massachusetts, United States. The population was 1,471 at the 2010 census.

== Geography ==
According to the United States Census Bureau, the CDP has a total area of 2.2 square miles (5.8 km^{2}), of which 2.0 square miles (5.3 km^{2}) is land and 0.19 square miles (0.5 km^{2}) (7.82%) is water.

== Demographics ==
Historical population
| Census | Pop. | Note | %± |
|---|---|---|---|
| 2020 | 1,517 | | — |
U.S. Decennial Census

As of the census of 2000, there were 1,426 people, 581 households, and 379 families residing in the CDP. The population density was 263.4 people/km^{2} (682 people/mi^{2}). There were 619 housing units at an average density of 114.4 units per square kilometre (296 inits/mi^{2}). The racial makeup of the CDP was 98.88% White, 0.21% African American, 0.00% Native American, 0.28% Asian, 0.07% Pacific Islander, 0.14% from other races, and 0.42% from two or more races. 0.98% of the population were Hispanic or Latino of any race.

There were 581 households, out of which 31.0% had children under the age of 18 living with them, 53.5% were married couples living together, 8.3% have a woman whose husband does not live with her, and 34.6% were non-families. 28.9% of all households were made up of individuals, and 12.4% had someone living alone who was 65 years of age or older. The average household size was 2.45 and the average family size was 3.04.

In the CDP, the population was spread out, with 23.8% under the age of 18, 4.9% from 18 to 24, 29.3% from 25 to 44, 26.7% from 45 to 64, and 15.3% who were 65 years of age or older. The median age was 41 years. For every 100 females, there were 95.3 males. For every 100 females age 18 and over, there were 100.9 males.

The median income for a household in the CDP was $52,039, and the median income for a family was $61,976. Males had a median income of $44,000 versus $31,987 for females. The per capita income for the CDP was $31,255. 5.7% of the population and 1.3% of families were below the poverty line. Out of the total people living in poverty, 1.1% are under the age of 18 and 15.0% are 65 or older.

== Education ==
The community is within the Manchester Essex Regional School District.
