= Rockport (CDP), Massachusetts =

Rockport, Massachusetts
- Census-designated place
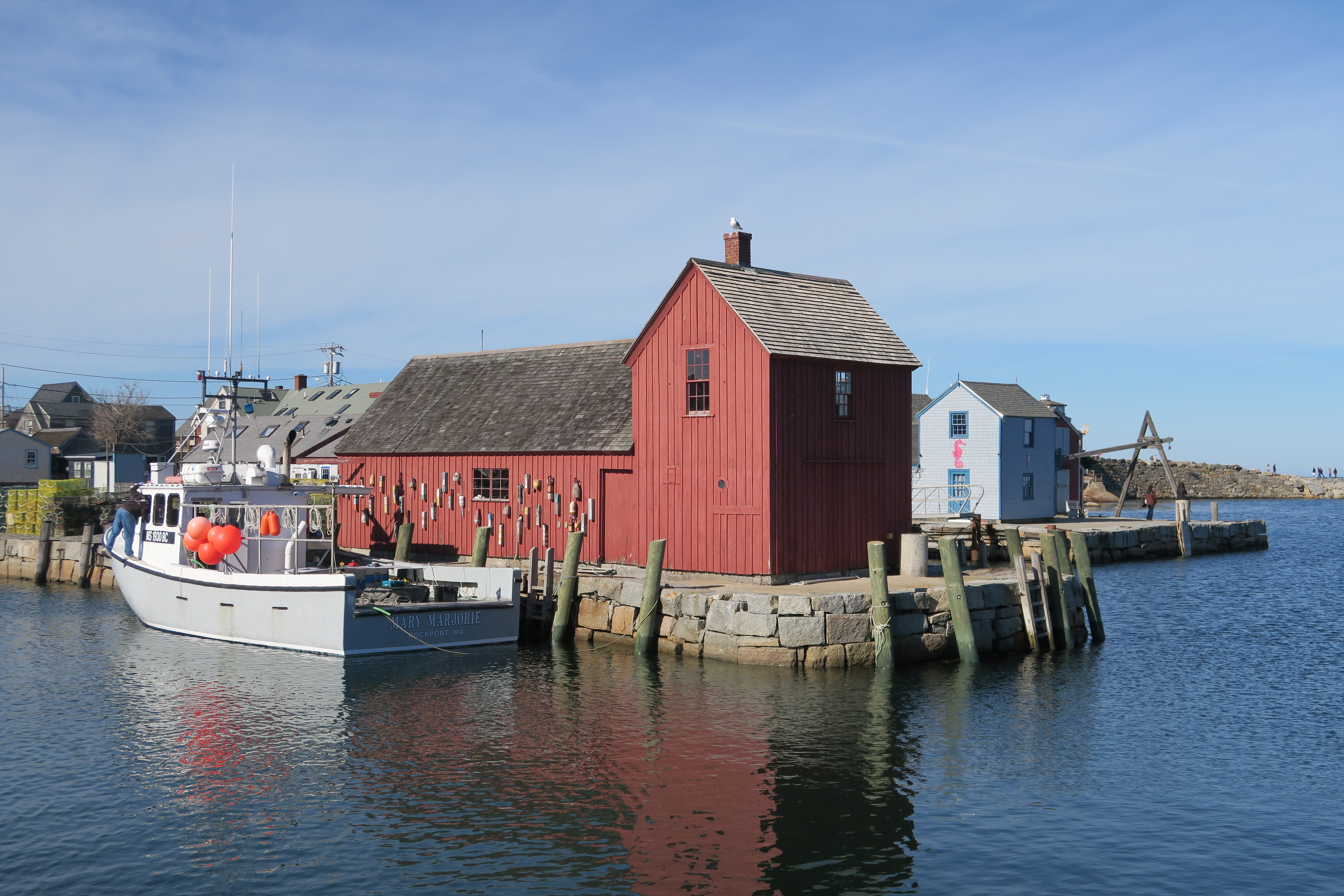
- Motif Number 1

- Location in Essex County and the state of Massachusetts.
- Coordinates: 42°39′12″N 70°36′57″W
- Country: United States
- State: Massachusetts
- County: Essex
- Town: Rockport

Area
  - Total: 4.09 sq mi (10.59 km^{2})
  - Land: 3.98 sq mi (10.31 km^{2})
  - Water: 0.11 sq mi (0.28 km^{2})
- Elevation: 52 ft (16 m)

Population (2020)
  - Total: 5,010
  - Density: 1,258.7/sq mi (485.99/km^{2})
- Time zone: UTC-5 (Eastern (EST))
  - Summer (DST): UTC-4 (EDT)
- ZIP code: 01966
- Area code: 978
- FIPS code: 25-57845
- GNIS feature ID: 0616229

Rockport is a census-designated place (CDP) in the town of Rockport in Essex County, Massachusetts, United States. The population was 4,966 at the 2010 census.

== Geography ==
According to the United States Census Bureau, the CDP has a total area of 4.1 square miles (10.6 km^{2}), of which 4.0 square miles (10.3 km^{2}) is land and 0.12 square miles (0.3 km^{2}) (2.62%) is water.

== Demographics ==
Historical population
Census	Pop.	Note	%±
2020	5,010		—
U.S. Decennial Census

As of the census of 2000, there were 5,606 people, 2,582 households, and 1,445 families residing in the CDP. The population density was 541.1 people/km^{2} (1,401 people/mi^{2}). There were 3,178 housing units at an average density of 306.8 units per square kilometre (795 units/mi^{2}). The racial makeup of the CDP was 97.91% White, 0.25% African American, 0.14% Native American, 0.46% Asian, 0.02% Pacific Islander, 0.37% from other races, and 0.84% from two or more races. 0.98% of the population were Hispanic or Latino of any race.

There were 2,582 households, out of which 23.2% had children under the age of 18 living with them, 46.3% were married couples living together, 7.0% have a woman whose husband does not live with her, and 44.0% were non-families. 39.0% of all households were made up of individuals, and 17.9% had someone living alone who was 65 years of age or older. The average household size was 2.14 and the average family size was 2.90.

In the CDP, the population was spread out, with 20.6% under the age of 18, 4.2% from 18 to 24, 24.3% from 25 to 44, 29.5% from 45 to 64, and 21.4% who were 65 years of age or older. The median age was 45 years. For every 100 females, there were 81.9 males. For every 100 females age 18 and over, there were 78.2 males.

The median income for a household in the CDP was $47,360, and the median income for a family was $67,621. Males had a median income of $48,088 versus $38,485 for females. The per capita income for the CDP was $29,506. 4.1% of the population and 2.9% of families were below the poverty line. Out of the total people living in poverty, 2.5% are under the age of 18 and 4.3% are 65 or older.
