= Massachusetts Route 107 =

State highway in Massachusetts, US

Route 107
- Route 107 highlighted in red

Route information
- Maintained by MassDOT
- Length: 11.9 mi (19.2 km)
- Existed: 1930–present

Major junctions
- South end: Route 16 at Revere-Chelsea border
- Route 60 in Revere; Route 129 in Lynn; Route 129A in Lynn; Route 114 in Salem
- North end: Route 1A at Salem-Beverly border

Location
- Country: United States
- State: Massachusetts
- Counties: Suffolk, Essex

Highway system
- Massachusetts State Highway System; Interstate; US; State
← Route 106	→ Route 108

Route 107 is a 11.9-mile-long (19.2 km) north–south Massachusetts state route located along the North Shore of Massachusetts. Route 107 runs from Route 16 in Revere to Route 1A at the Essex Bridge in Salem.

== Route description ==
Route 107 begins in Revere at an interchange with Route 16 (the Revere Beach Parkway) just north of the Chelsea town line. The route serves as Broadway, the main street through the city of Revere. The route intersects Route 60 at Brown Circle. From the rotary, the route becomes a limited access highway through the Rumney Marsh Reservation as the Salem Turnpike, entering Saugus over the Pines River. It continues as an expressway for roughly 2.2 miles (3.5 km) until just before the Saugus River, where the road enters Lynn via the Belden Bly Bridge.

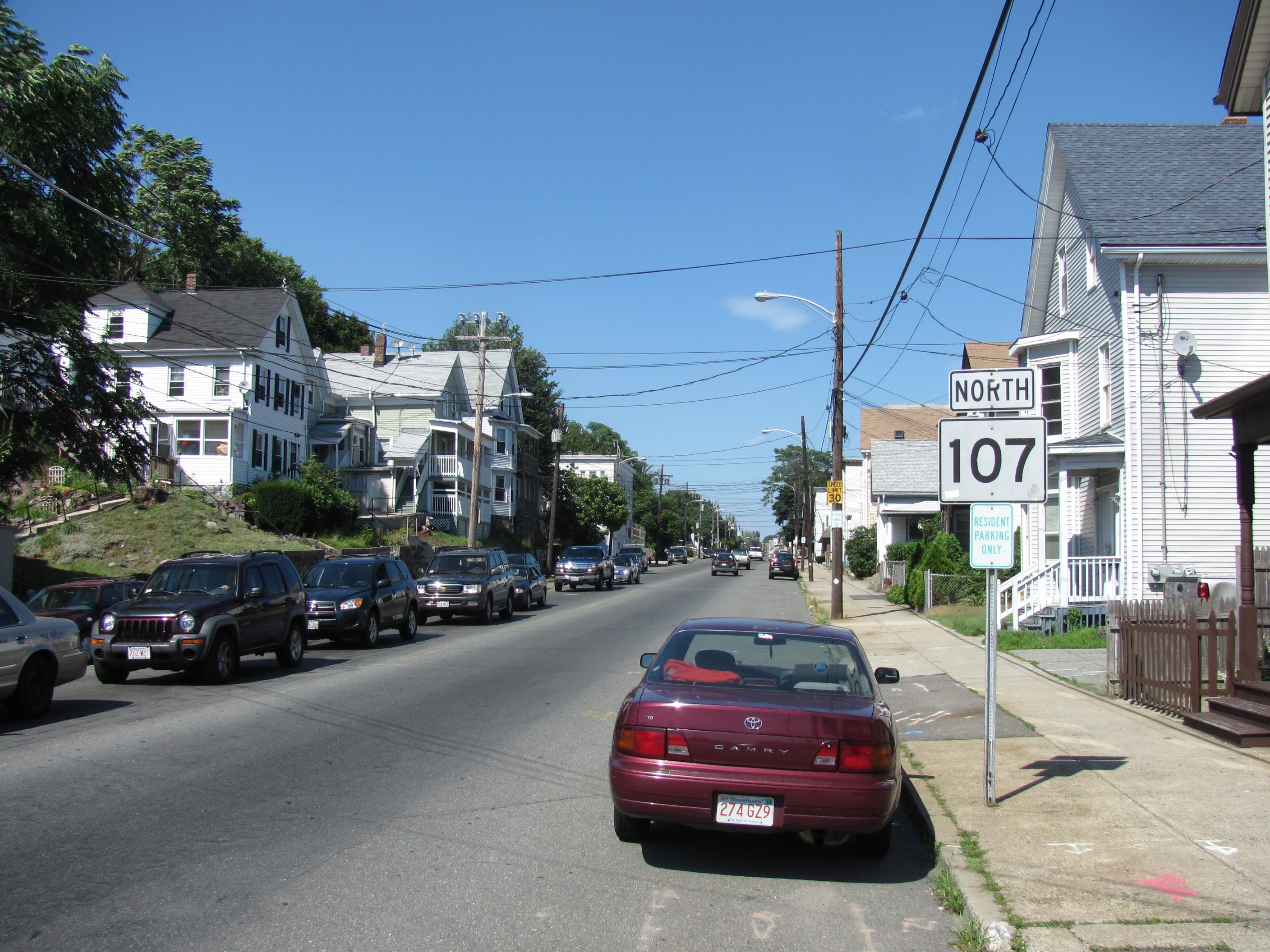
Route 107 northbound in Lynn

In Lynn, Route 107 becomes Western Avenue, immediately passing the General Electric River Works. The route continues through the city, passing the western end of Lynn Commons before intersecting Route 129. The route passes Bayridge Hospital and Fraser Field before meeting Route 129A, running concurrently for approximately half a mile eastward until Route 129A turns southward. The concurrency with Route 129A was the original alignment of Route 129 prior to the creation of Route 129A in 1996. The route crosses Floating Bridge Pond, so named because the original roadway was an actual floating bridge, before entering the city of Salem.

Route 107 in Salem travels as Highland Avenue, heading uphill and passing the area of Salem Hospital/North Shore Medical Center before the road meets Boston Street at Essex Street. Route 107 turns west along Boston Street before turning northward again along Bridge Street, not far from Gallows Hill Park, site of the hanging during the Salem witch trials. The route travels along the North River before having an interchange with Route 114. The route then passes the Salem MBTA station, and becomes a limited access route once again as the Bridge Street Bypass. Completed in 2008, this super two section of Route 107 keeps traffic from the MBTA station and other areas of Salem off the busy city streets, following just west of the MBTA commuter tracks before ending at Route 1A at the Salem end of the Veterans Memorial Bridge over the Danvers River.

Prior to the completion of the Bridge Street Bypass, Route 107's northern end was at the intersection of Bridge Street and Winter Street, north of Salem Commons, where Route 1A turns from Winter Street to Bridge Street northbound. Because of the moving of the northern end, the route was lengthened from 11.29 miles (18.17 km) to 11.9 miles (19.2 km).

== Major intersections ==
County	Location	mi	km	Destinations	Notes
Suffolk	Revere	0.0	0.0	Route 16 (Revere Beach Parkway) – Everett, Somerville, Winthrop	Southern terminus
Suffolk	Revere	1.5	2.4	Route 60 – Revere Beach, Boston, Malden, N.H., Maine	Bates Circle – Rotary intersection
Essex	Lynn	5.7	9.2	Route 129	
Essex	Lynn	6.4	10.3	Route 129A west to I-95 / US 1 – Lynnfield	Beginning of concurrency with Route 129A
Essex	Lynn	7.0	11.3	Route 129A east – Swampscott, Marblehead	End of concurrency with Route 129A
Essex	Salem	10.9	17.5	Route 114 – Marblehead, Danvers	
Essex	Salem	11.9	19.2	Route 1A – Swampscott, Lynn	Northern terminus; southern end of Essex Bridge
1.000 mi = 1.609 km; 1.000 km = 0.621 mi: Concurrency terminus

== See also ==
- 19th-century turnpikes in Massachusetts
