= Massachusetts Route 1A =

North-south state highway in Massachusetts, US

Route 1A

Route information
- Maintained by MassDOT
- Length: 95.120 mi (153.081 km)
- Existed: By 1927–present

Major junctions
- South end: US 1A in Pawtucket, RI
- I-95 in Attleboro; I-495 in Wrentham; I-95 / US 1 / Route 128 in Dedham; I-93 / US 1 / Route 3 in Boston I-90 Toll / Mass Pike in Boston; Route 128 in Beverly; US 1 from Newburyport to Salisbury
- North end: NH 1A in Seabrook, NH

Location
- Country: United States
- State: Massachusetts

Highway system
- Massachusetts State Highway System; Interstate; US; State
← US 1	→ Route C1

Route 1A is a north–south state highway in the U.S. state of Massachusetts. It is an alternate route to U.S. Route 1 (US 1) with three signed sections and two unsigned sections where the highway is concurrent with its parent.

== Route description ==
=== Attleboro segment ===
A short segment of Route 1A, 1.8 miles (2.9 km) in length, in Attleboro runs from US 1A at the Rhode Island border through a junction with Interstate 95 (I-95), before heading north and merging with US 1. The entire length of this segment is known as Newport Avenue.

=== North Attleborough–Dedham segment ===
This segment of Route 1A extends roughly north from North Attleborough to Dedham, passing through the towns of Plainville, Wrentham, Norfolk, Walpole, Norwood and Westwood on the way. Prior to its realignment along I-95 and I-93, US 1 continued north along the Providence Highway towards Boston at the junction of Route 1A and that road.

=== Boston–Salisbury segment ===
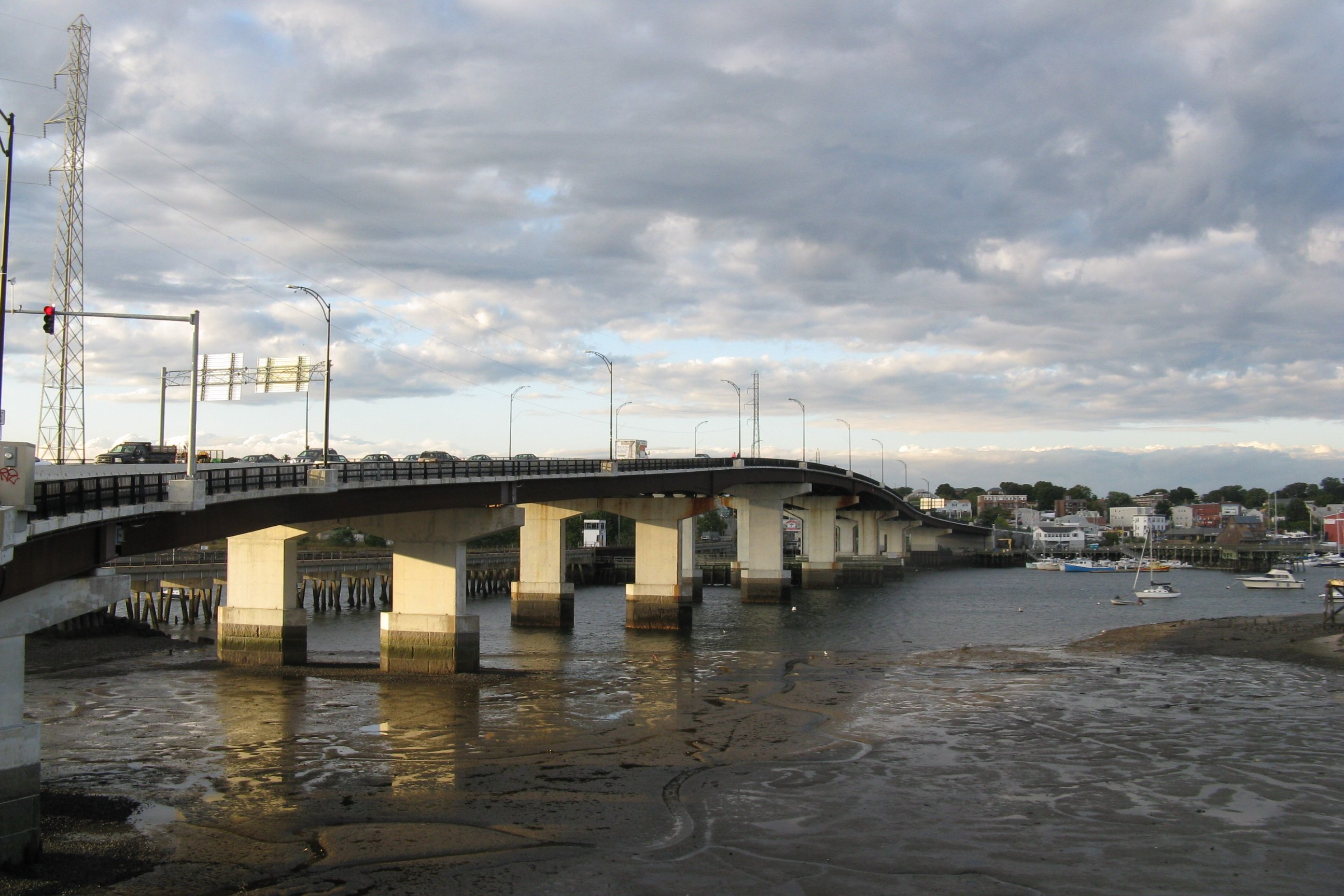
Veterans Memorial Bridge entering Beverly

This segment of Route 1A extends from Boston to Salisbury.

The highway starts from US 1 (which is on the Central Artery with I-93 and Route 3) at the former Government Center/Logan Airport interchange. It passes through the Callahan Tunnel (northbound) and Sumner Tunnel (southbound), becoming the East Boston Expressway past Logan Airport. I-90 ends at Route 1A just north of the airport.

The road continues as a limited-access divided highway through Revere. It runs as North Shore Road along the Point of Pines peninsula then crosses General Edwards Bridge into Lynn. The southern portion in Lynn is the Lynnway, part of the Metropolitan Park System of Greater Boston parkway network. The route then runs concurrently with Route 129 before crossing into Swampscott as Paradise Road. At Vinnin Square, it passes into Salem as Loring Avenue.

Route 1A follows Lafayette Street (Route 114) into downtown Salem, then Derby, Hawthorne, Winter, and Bridge streets. It crosses the Veterans Memorial Bridge into Beverly. The route follows local roads through Beverly, Wenham, and Hamilton, then runs concurrently with Route 133 through Ipswich, where it crosses the Choate Bridge over the Ipswich River.

It continues north through Rowley and Newbury, then enters Newburyport as High Road. Route 1A is concurrent with US 1 crossing over the Merrimack River to Salisbury. It then heads east to Salisbury Beach, then follows the waterfront north to the New Hampshire border, where it continues as New Hampshire Route 1A.

== History ==
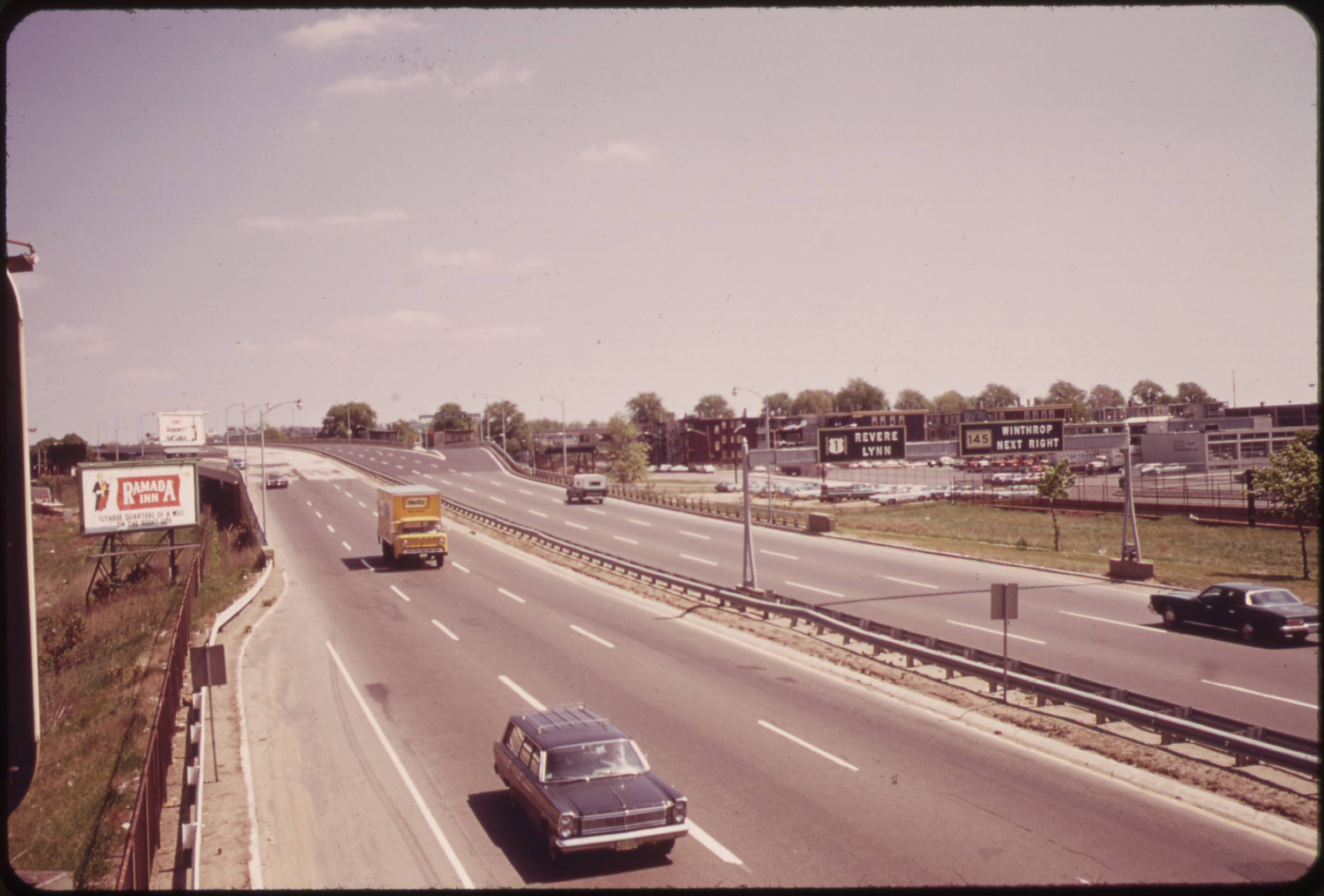
The East Boston Expressway in 1973

Initially, Route 1A ran along part of its present-day route between the New Hampshire state line and Revere. It then turned west along present-day Route 16 until it ended at US 1 (now Route 99) in Everett. Then, in 1931, an interchange in Revere was built over Route 107 (Broadway). In 1933, another, disconnected portion of Route 1A appeared between Attleboro and the Rhode Island state line. In 1934, two changes were made to the route. In Revere, the route was realigned to turn west smoothly. Between Boston and North Attleborough, a huge portion of Route 11 and all of Route 150 were replaced by Route 1A. The new portion soon got truncated to Dedham in 1936. It then got truncated even further to end at US 1/Route 128.

The overpass between the Sumner Tunnel and Logan Airport was designed as the Professor Enrico Fermi Overpass in 1955. The northern portion of the East Boston Expressway was designated the Italian American War Veterans Highway in 1961.

After Route C1 was decommissioned in 1971 in favor of a new alignment of US 1, Route 1A was truncated to a roundabout interchange in Revere. As a result, Route 16 extended eastward along the then-former route. After all unbuilt Boston freeways were cancelled by 1973, US 1 was rerouted onto the Northeast Expressway (formerly proposed I-95). As a result of that, Route 1A was extended south towards the Sumner and Callahan tunnels and then north along Central Artery towards US 1 (Storrow Drive). In 1989, US 1 was rerouted from Storrow Drive onto I-93's Southeast Expressway, causing "signed" Route 1A to get truncated.

== Major intersections ==
County	Location	mi	km	Destinations	Notes
Bristol	Attleboro	0.000	0.000	US 1A south – Pawtucket	Continuation into Rhode Island
Bristol	Attleboro	0.412	0.663	I-95 – Foxboro, Boston, Providence, RI	Exits 2A-B on I-95
Bristol	Attleboro	1.637	2.634	Route 123 – Attleboro, Brockton, Valley Falls, RI, Lincoln, RI	
Bristol	Attleboro	1.728	2.781	US 1 south	Southern terminus of unsigned concurrency with US 1
Bristol	See US 1 mileposts 2.4–7.0				
Bristol	North Attleborough	7.109	11.441	US 1 north – Boston	Northern terminus of unsigned concurrency with US 1
Norfolk	Plainville	7.981	12.844	Route 106 east to US 1 – Mansfield, West Bridgewater	Western end of Route 106
Norfolk	Wrentham	10.634	17.114	I-495 to I-95 – Taunton, Cape Cod, Marlboro, Lowell	Exit 38 on I-495
Norfolk	Wrentham	11.375	18.306	Route 121 south – Woonsocket, RI	Northern terminus of Route 121
Norfolk	Wrentham	12.840	20.664	Route 140 – Franklin, Milford, Foxboro, Taunton	
Norfolk	Norfolk	15.091	24.287	Route 115 – Norfolk, Millis, Foxboro	
Norfolk	Walpole	19.70	31.70	Route 27 – Medfield, Natick, Sharon, Stoughton	
Norfolk	Dedham	27.144	43.684	Providence Highway to I-95 / US 1 / Route 128 – Boston, Providence, RI	Southern end of silent Providence Highway and US 1 concurrencies; formerly US 1
See Route 128 exits 37-39 and I-93 exits 1-17B
Suffolk	Boston			I-93 north (US 1) / Route 3 north (Storrow Drive) – Government Center	Northern terminus of silent US 1 concurrency; exit 17B on Central Artery; last northbound exit before toll
Suffolk	Boston			Haymarket Square	Northbound entrance only
Suffolk	Boston			Sumner (southbound) and Callahan (northbound) tunnels	
Suffolk	Boston	49.482	79.634	East Boston	Access via Porter Street; last southbound exit before toll
Suffolk	Boston	49.677– 50.023	79.947– 80.504	I-90 Toll west / Mass Pike west to I-93 south – Williams Tunnel, Logan Airport	Eastern terminus of I-90 / Mass Pike; no northbound access to I-90
Suffolk	Boston	50.305	80.958	Route 145 north (Bennington Street) – Winthrop, Chelsea	Interchange; southern terminus of Route 145
Suffolk	Revere	52.487	84.470	Route 145	Interchange, northbound exit and southbound entrance
Suffolk	Revere	52.852	85.057	Route 16 west / Route 60 west – Malden, Lynn, Revere Beach, Chelsea	Eastern end of Route 16 and Route 60; to US 1 via Route 60 and Route 145 via Route 16
Essex	Lynn	55.843	89.871	Lynnway east – Nahant, Swampscott	
Essex	Lynn	58.018	93.371	Route 129 west – Lynnfield	Southern end of Route 129 concurrency
Essex	Lynn	59.167	95.220	Route 129 east – Swampscott, Marblehead	Northern end of Route 129 concurrency
Essex	Salem	62.554	100.671	Route 114 east – Marblehead	Southern end of Route 114 concurrency
Essex	Salem	63.326	101.913	Route 114 west	Northern end of Route 114 concurrency
Essex	Salem	64.250	103.400	Route 107 south – Lynn, Malden	Northern terminus of Route 107
Essex	Danvers River	64.933	104.500	Essex Bridge	
Essex	Beverly	65.447	105.327	Route 22 north / Route 127 north	Southern terminus of Route 22 and Route 127
Essex	Beverly	66.242	106.606	Route 62 – Danvers, Beverly Farms	
Essex	Beverly	67.699	108.951	Route 97 north – Topsfield	Southern terminus of Route 97
Essex	Beverly	67.897	109.270	Route 128 – Gloucester, Rockport, Peabody, Boston	Exits 45A-B on Route 128; cloverleaf interchange
Essex	Ipswich	75.603	121.671	Route 133 east – Essex	Southern end of Route 133 concurrency
Essex	Rowley	79.754	128.352	Route 133 west – Georgetown	Northern end of Route 133 concurrency
Essex	Newburyport	88.395	142.258	Route 113 west – West Newbury, Groveland	Eastern terminus of Route 113
Essex	Newburyport	88.588	142.569	US 1 south – Danvers, Boston	Southern end of US 1 concurrency; southbound exit and northbound entrance
Essex	Salisbury	90.879	146.256	US 1 north / Route 110 west to I-95 / I-495 – Amesbury, Merrimac, Salisbury Beach	Northern end of US 1 concurrency; east terminus of Route 110
Essex	Salisbury	95.120	153.081	NH 1A north to NH 286 – Hampton	Continuation into New Hampshire
1.000 mi = 1.609 km; 1.000 km = 0.621 mi: Concurrency terminus; Electronic toll collection; Incomplete access
