= Joseph Bancroft House =

Historic house in Massachusetts, United States

- U.S. National Register of Historic Places
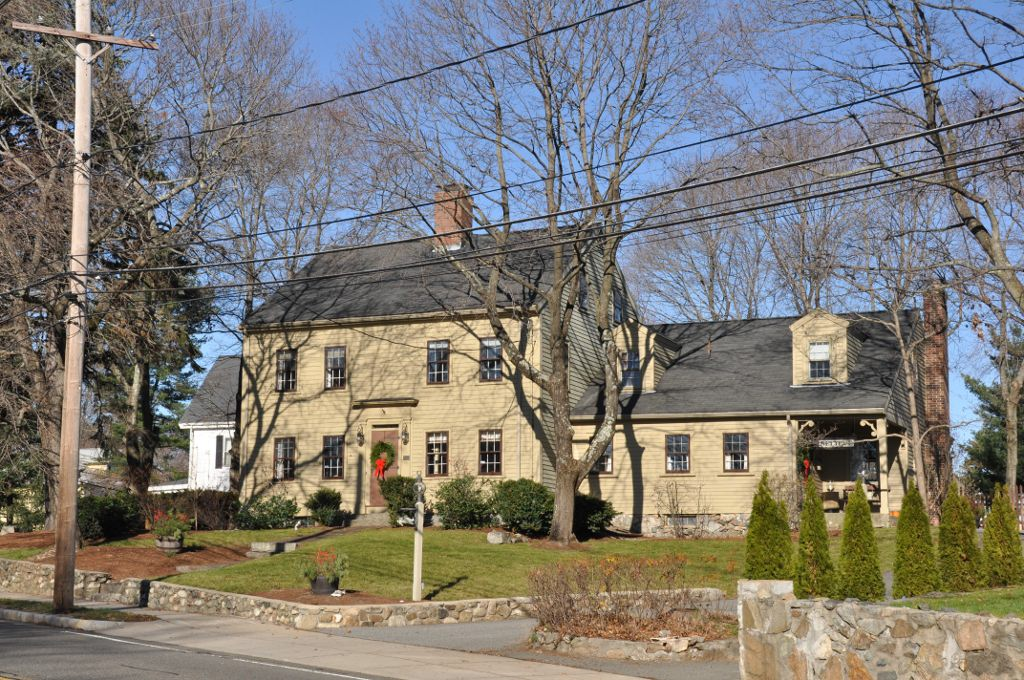

- Location within Massachusetts Location within the United States
- Location: 101 Lowell St., Reading, Massachusetts
- Coordinates: 42°31′41″N 71°6′32″W
- Built: 1833
- Architectural style: Federal
- MPS: Reading MRA
- NRHP reference No.: 84002467
- Added to NRHP: July 19, 1984

The Joseph Bancroft House is a historic house in Reading, Massachusetts. Built in the early 1830s, it is a prominent local example of Federal period architecture. It was built for a member of the locally prominent Bancroft family, who inherited a large tract of land in the area. The house was listed on the National Register of Historic Places in 1984.

== Description and history ==
The Joseph Bancroft House stands on the north side of Lowell Street (Massachusetts Route 129), at northeast corner of its junction with Bancroft Avenue. It is a 2 1/2-story wood-frame structure, set back from the street on a lot that is fronted by a low fieldstone retaining wall. The roof is gabled, and the exterior is clad in wooden clapboards. The main facade is five bays wide and symmetrical, with a central entrance framed by pilasters and a corniced entablature. There is no window above the entrance, and most windows are placed slightly lower than is typical for the Federal period. A single-story ell extends to the right of the main block with a dormered gable roof.

The house was built on a large tract of land inherited by Joseph Bancroft. It may have been built around the time of Bancroft's marriage in 1833, and does not appear on an 1830 map of the town. The Bancroft family owned most of the Reading Highlands for many years; the area south of Lowell Street was inherited by Joseph's brother. An earlier Joseph Bancroft was prominent in the town for introducing the shoe manufacturing trade to the town, which was a cottage industry for many years.

== See also ==
- National Register of Historic Places listings in Reading, Massachusetts
- National Register of Historic Places listings in Middlesex County, Massachusetts
