= U.S. Route 1 in Massachusetts =

Section of U.S. Route in Massachusetts, United States

U.S. Route 1

Route information
- Maintained by MassDOT
- Length: 86.253 mi (138.811 km)
- Existed: 1926–present

Major junctions
- South end: US 1 at the Rhode Island state line in Pawtucket, RI
- I-95 in Attleboro and Sharon; I-295 in North Attleborough; I-495 in Plainville; I-95 / Route 128 from Dedham to Canton; I-93 from Canton to Boston; Route 3 from Braintree to Boston; I-90 / Mass Pike in Boston; I-95 in Danvers
- North end: US 1 at the New Hampshire state line in Seabrook, NH

Location
- Country: United States
- State: Massachusetts
- Counties: Bristol, Norfolk, Suffolk, Middlesex, Essex

Highway system
- United States Numbered Highway System; List; Special; Divided; Massachusetts State Highway System; Interstate; US; State
← I-895	→ Route 1A
← Route 1A	→ Route 2

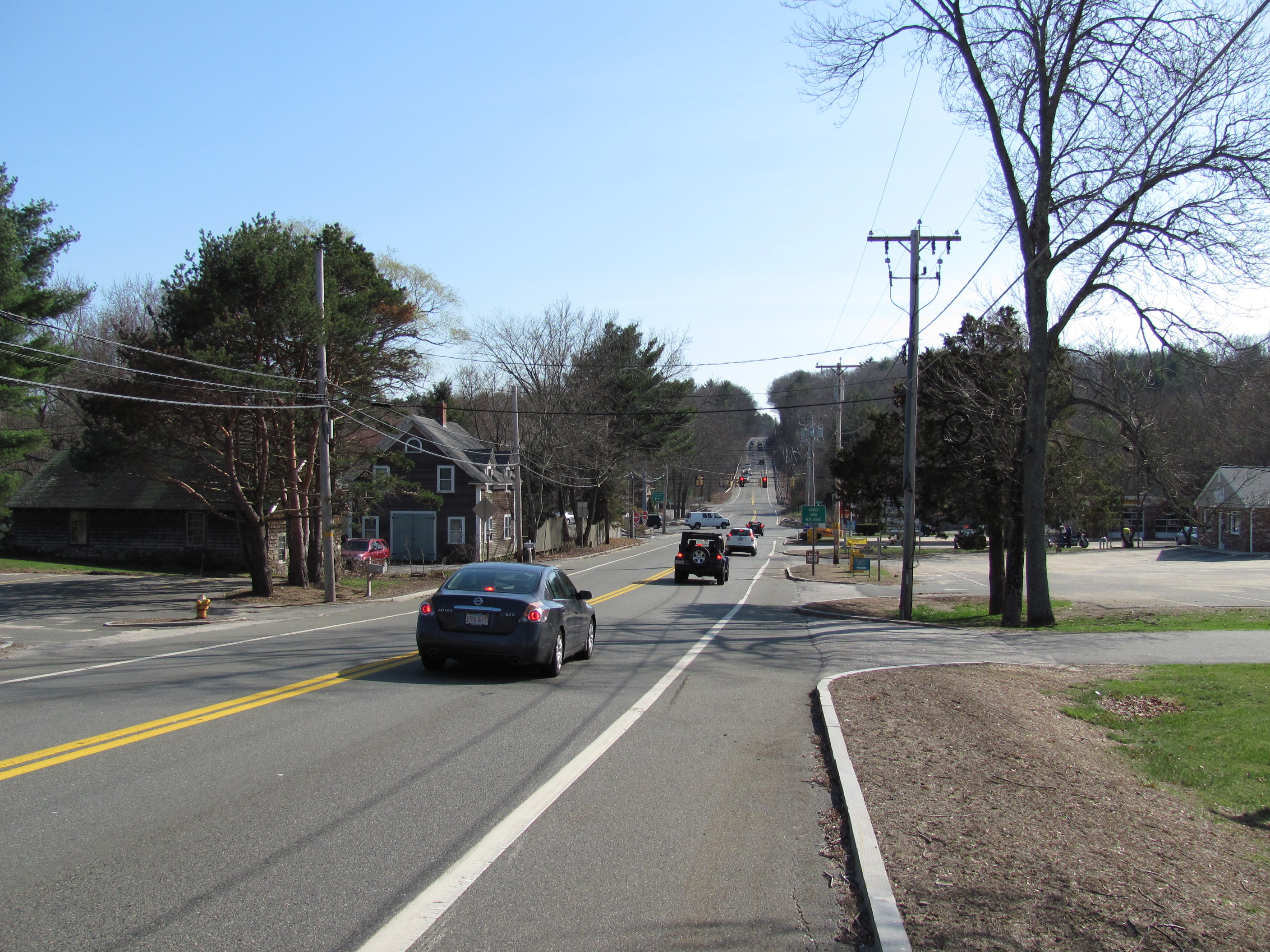
Southbound in Topsfield

U.S. Route 1 (US 1) is a major north–south U.S. Route that runs from Key West, Florida, to Fort Kent, Maine. In the state of Massachusetts, it travels through Essex, Middlesex, Suffolk, Norfolk, and Bristol counties. The portion of US 1 south of Boston is also known as the Boston–Providence Turnpike, Washington Street, or the Norfolk and Bristol Turnpike, and portions north of Boston are known as the Northeast Expressway and the Newburyport Turnpike.

== Route description ==
From the south, US 1 enters Massachusetts from Rhode Island, immediately entering the city of Attleboro. It closely parallels Interstate 95 (I-95) as it goes through the towns of North Attleborough, Plainville, Wrentham, Foxborough (where Gillette Stadium is located), Walpole, Sharon, Norwood, and Westwood. US 1 then has a wrong-way concurrency with I-95 up to the interchange that is the southern terminus of I-93. US 1 then travels concurrently with I-93 from Canton through Downtown Boston; Route 3 joins the concurrency in Braintree. In Downtown Boston, Route 1A and Route 3 separate from US 1 to head toward Logan International Airport and Cambridge respectively, and I-93 and US 1 separate just after passing through the O'Neill Tunnel and crossing the Leonard P. Zakim Bunker Hill Memorial Bridge. US 1 continues north, crossing the Tobin Bridge as the Northeast Expressway and traveling through Chelsea, Revere, and Malden, then as a four- to six-lane expressway through Saugus, Lynnfield, and Peabody.

The route through Saugus was once known for its abundance of kitschy roadside commercial architecture. Those that still exist as of 2023 include the 68-foot (21 m) neon cactus originally erected for the Hilltop Steak House, the tiki-styled Kowloon Restaurant, the Prince Restaurant's "Leaning Tower of Pizza", and a large orange dinosaur statue that was once part of a miniature golf course. Former structures along Route 1 included restaurants built in the shapes of a ship and a Chinese palace.

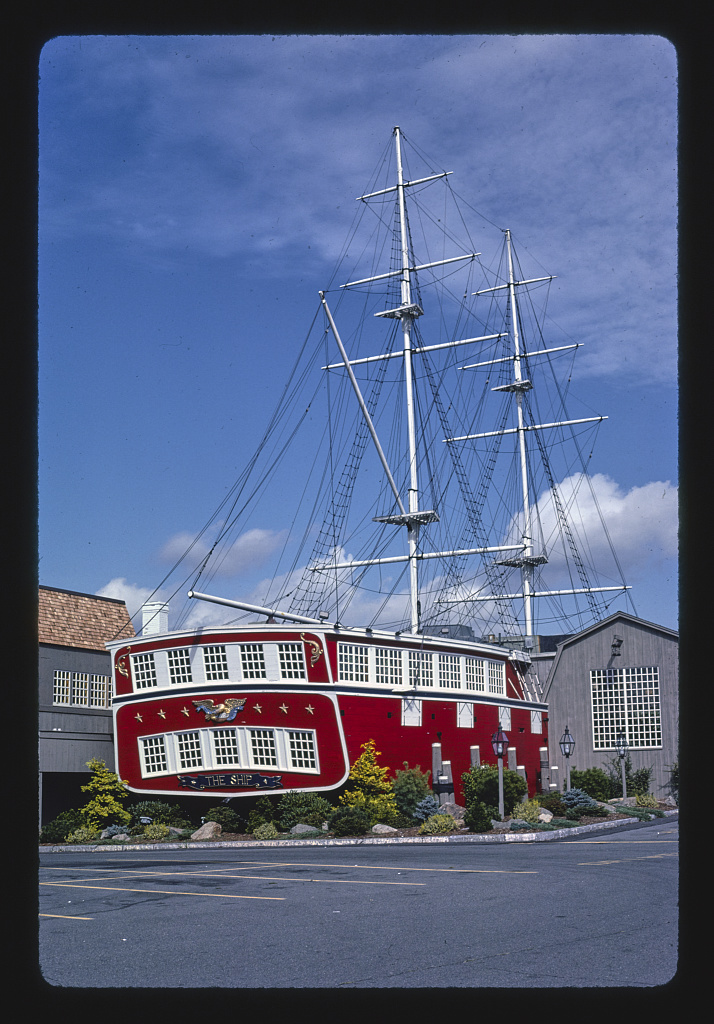
The Ship Restaurant, Route 1, Saugus, Massachusetts (1984)

From Peabody, US 1 again closely parallels I-95 going through the towns of Danvers, Topsfield, Ipswich, Rowley, Newbury, and Newburyport. In Newburyport, US 1 has a mile-long (1.6 km) freeway segment that bypasses downtown and the waterfront areas; Route 1A joins the freeway shortly before it crosses the Merrimack River, entering Salisbury and becoming a surface arterial again. Three miles (4.8 km) later, it enters the state of New Hampshire.

Route 1A runs alongside US 1 in four parts of the state.

== History ==
US 1 in Massachusetts was constructed in sections throughout the 1930s partly by widening existing roads and also by constructing new right of ways to bypass more congested areas. Originally, most of the highway was two or three lanes in each direction, with numerous widening and improvements made over the years.

Most of US 1 consists of two former turnpike roads—the Norfolk and Bristol Turnpike and the Newburyport Turnpike. The older roads that these turnpikes were meant to bypass are now mostly Route 1A.

The Newburyport Turnpike opened on February 11, 1805, and was constructed by a private company at a cost of $500,000 (equivalent to $10.8 million in 2025). The turnpike was used by stagecoaches and mail carriers for decades, but toll collection ceased in 1847 as parallel railroads attracted more use.

Several sections were rebuilt to accommodate automobile traffic in the early 20th century, but it saw decreased use following the completion of I-95.

The section in downtown Newsburyport was bypassed in 1934.

In the early 1930s, Route C1 was designated as an alternate route of US 1 through Downtown Boston. The "C" indicated a city route. The C designation was apparently distinct to the Boston area. Route C1 ran along Brookline Avenue, Beacon Street, Embankment Road (modern Route 28), Charles Street, Lowell Street, Merrimac Street, and Cross Street to the west end of the Sumner Tunnel. In East Boston, it went via Porter Street to Chelsea Street then shifted to the William McClellan Highway (modern Route 1A) as Storrow Drive and the Central Artery.

In the 1950s, Route C1 was rerouted to follow portions of these highways. The Route C1 designation was removed in 1971, with US 1 taking over most of the alignment south of the Charles River, and Route 1A taking over most of the alignment north of the river. US 1 was later moved onto the Southeast Expressway leaving most of the former alignment of Route C1 south of the river as having no number.

For a period of time during the 1950s, a segment of US 1 in Massachusetts and New Hampshire was routed onto what later became I-95. The roadway that had been US 1 was designated as Route 17 from Danvers to Salisbury and New Hampshire Route 17 (NH 17) for a short distance in Seabrook.

Once the I-95 designation was adopted, Route 17 and NH 17 were restored to being US 1.

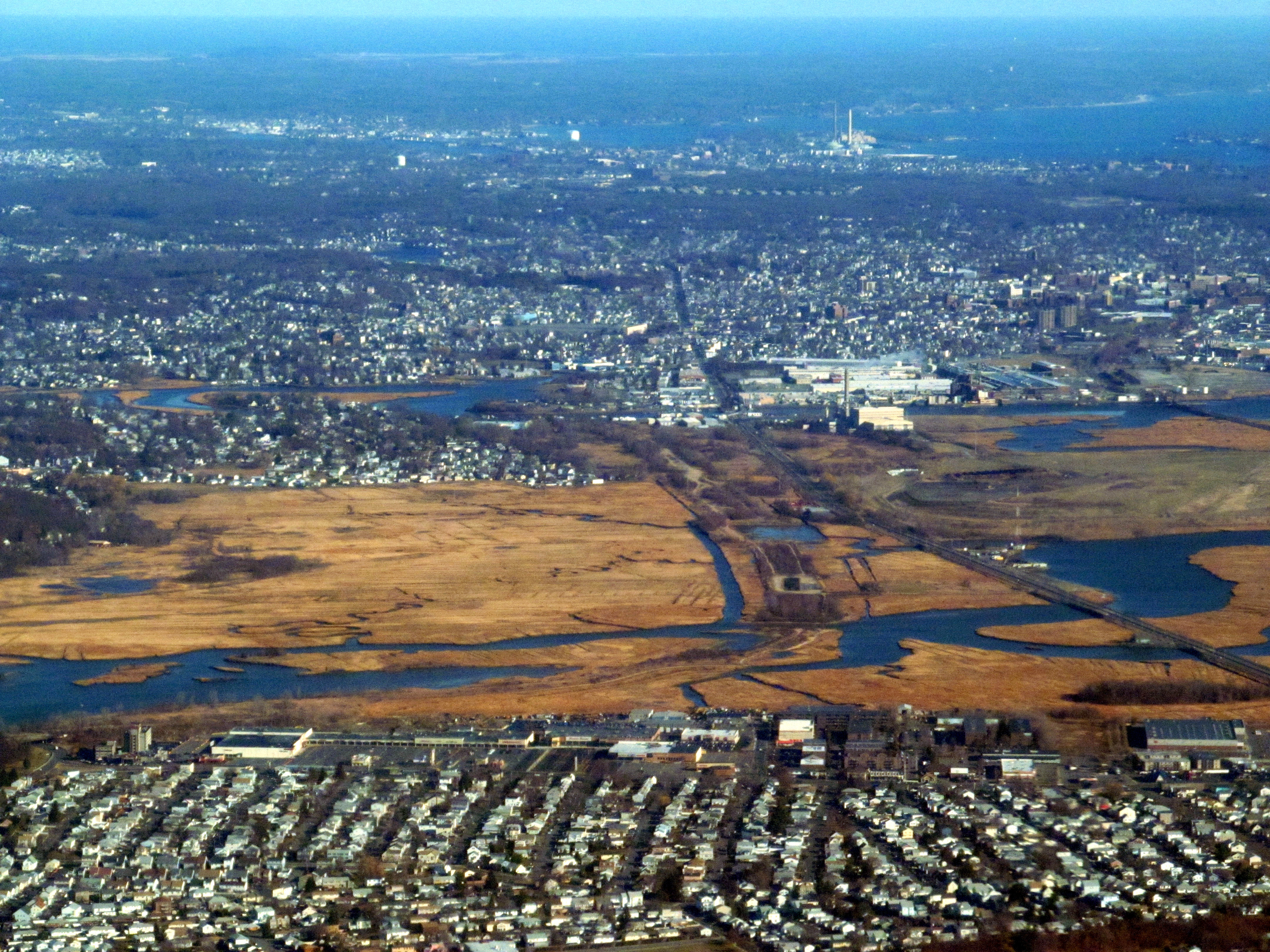
Causeway (center) for the unbuilt section of the Northeast Expressway across Saugus Marsh

The Northeast Expressway was planned to extend north, as part of I-95, from Saugus, through Lynn, Lynnfield and Peabody. The highway would bisect the Saugus Marsh and Lynn Woods Reservation.

The highway would then connect with the present junction of I-95 and Route 128 in Peabody. The Northeast Expressway was planned to carry the I-95 designation from Charlestown to Peabody. The first section of the expressway built was the Tobin Bridge over the Mystic River, which opened in 1950. In various stages, the Chelsea and Revere portions opened from 1956 to 1958.

The highway carried the I-95 designation from 1955 (in its planning stages) to 1973. It was among the canceled highways affected by Governor Francis Sargent's February 1970 moratorium on expressway construction within Route 128. US 1 replaced I-95 on the Northeast Expressway in the 1970s, after I-95 joined Route 128 from Westwood to Peabody around Boston.

In the late 1980s, at the request of the Metropolitan District Commission (now the Department of Conservation and Recreation) in an attempt to reduce the incidence of overheight vehicles finding their way onto Storrow Drive, US 1 was moved onto I-93 south of and through Boston, leaving the old route—Veterans of Foreign Wars Parkway (VFW Parkway), Jamaicaway, Riverway, and Storrow Drive through Dedham, Chestnut Hill, West Roxbury, Jamaica Plain, and central Boston—without a number. There are still some street signs incorrectly indicating the former alignment as US 1, and many local residents still refer to parts of VFW Parkway and Jamaicaway as "Route 1", as if it still runs along its old trajectory.

== Future ==
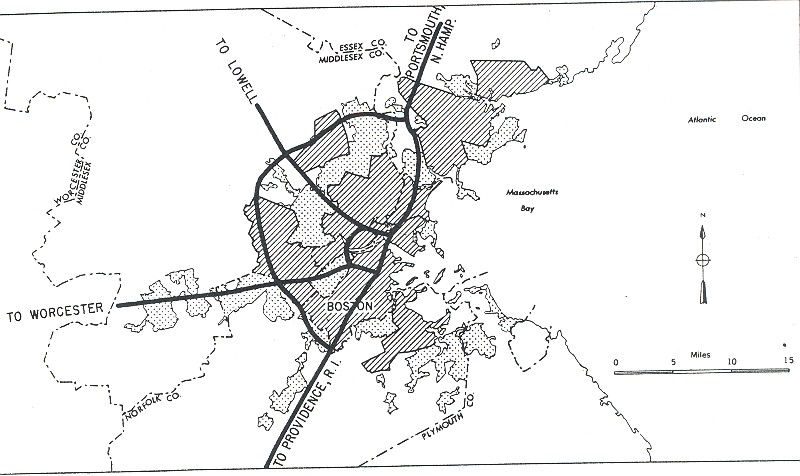
1955 Yellow Book plan for the Boston area showing the Northeast Expressway path and paths of other proposed Interstate Highways within Route 128

In the early 2010s, the Massachusetts Department of Transportation (MassDOT) proposed a $137-million (equivalent to $192 million in 2024) project to widen the existing 2.4-mile (3.9 km) four-lane highway section to six lanes, from north of Route 99 in Saugus to south of Route 60 in Revere. The proposal consisted of adding a 12-foot (3.7 m) travel lane and 10-foot (3.0 m) shoulder in each direction. Work would also include reconstruction of the Copeland Circle interchange by eliminating the existing rotary, and demolition of the existing 1957 bridges from the never-built highway extension. The Lynn Street/Salem Street interchange in Malden, and the Route 99 interchange in Saugus, were slated to be reconstructed. Major rock blasting would be required for the project due to a massive ledge next to the highway, and seven bridges would be replaced and three others upgraded to handle the new lanes. In 2012, $10 million (equivalent to $13.5 million in 2024) was added to the state budget with the intent to be used for design costs and pulling permits for US 1. The project was expected to begin in 2012, but no further movement by the state has been implemented. Since then, town officials have made the push to ask MassDOT to revisit the project and begin development.

== Major intersections ==
County	Location	mi	km	Old exit	New exit	Destinations	Notes
Bristol	Attleboro	0.000	0.000			US 1 south – Pawtucket	Continuation into Rhode Island
Bristol	Attleboro	0.291	0.468			I-95 north – Foxboro, Boston	Northbound exit and southbound entrance; exit 1 on I-95
Bristol	Attleboro	1.845	2.969			Route 123 (Highland Avenue) – Attleboro, Brockton, Valley Falls, RI, Lincoln, RI	
Bristol	Attleboro	2.036	3.277			Route 1A south – Attleboro, Providence, RI	Northern terminus of Route 1A
Bristol	North Attleborough	3.974	6.396			I-295 to I-95 – Attleboro, Boston, Warwick, RI	Exits 2A-B on I-295
Bristol	North Attleborough	5.238	8.430			Route 120 west (Hoppin Hill Avenue) – Cumberland, RI	Eastern terminus of Route 120
Bristol	North Attleborough	7.318	11.777			Route 1A north (Park Street) – Plainville, Wrentham	Southern terminus of Route 1A
Norfolk	Plainville	8.370	13.470			Route 106 (Bacon Street) – Mansfield, Easton, Plainville	
Norfolk	Plainville	9.992	16.081			Route 152 south (Taunton Street) – Plainville, Attleboro, Seekonk	Northern terminus of Route 152
Norfolk	Plainville	10.600	17.059			I-495 to I-95 – Cape Cod, Marlboro	Exits 36A-B on I-495
Norfolk	Foxborough	13.506	21.736			Route 140 – Foxboro, Wrentham	Interchange; access via East Street/Main Street/Pine Street. To Route 115
Norfolk	Sharon	18.597	29.929			I-95 – Boston, Attleboro, Providence, RI	Exit 19 on I-95
Norfolk	Walpole	19.264	31.002			Route 27 (High Plain Street) – Walpole, Medfield, Sharon	
Norfolk	Norwood	23.058	37.108			Neponset Street / Nahatan Street – Norwood, Canton	Pendergast Circle; roundabout interchange
Norfolk	Dedham	26.319	42.356	Southern end of freeway section			
Norfolk	Dedham	26.319	42.356	15	29	I-95 north / Route 128 north to Route 1A – Peabody, Portsmouth, NH	Signed as exits 29B (I-95) and 29A (Route 1A); southern end of I-95/Route 128 concurrency; Route 128 not signed southbound
Norfolk	Westwood	26.922	43.327	14	28	East Street / Canton Street	
Norfolk	Dedham	28.131	45.272	13	27	University Avenue – MBTA / Amtrak Station	
Norfolk	Canton	28.693	46.177	12 (NB); 63A (SB)	26 (NB); 1A (SB)	I-95 south – Providence, RI	Northern end of I-95 concurrency
Norfolk	Canton	28.693	46.177	Route 128 ends, I-93 begins			
Norfolk	Canton	30.053	48.366	64	2	Route 138 (Washington Street) – Stoughton, Milton	Signed as exits 2A (south) and 2B (north)
Norfolk	Milton	31.262	50.311	65	3	Ponkapoag Trail – Houghton's Pond	
Norfolk	Randolph	32.046	51.573	66	4	Route 24 south – Fall River	Left exit northbound; northern terminus and exits 41A-B on Route 24
Norfolk	Randolph	32.882	52.918	67	5	Route 28 (Main Street) – Randolph, Milton	Signed as exits 5A (south) and 5B (north)
Norfolk	Braintree	35.087	56.467	68	6	Route 37 south (Granite Street) – Braintree, Holbrook, West Quincy	Northern terminus of Route 37
Norfolk	Braintree	35.382	56.942	—	7	Route 3 south – Braintree, Cape Cod	Braintree Split; southern end of Route 3 concurrency; exit 43 on Route 3
Norfolk	Quincy	36.764	59.166	—	8	Furnace Brook Parkway – Quincy	
Norfolk	Quincy	37.815	60.857	—	9	Adams Street / Bryant Avenue – North Quincy, West Quincy, Milton	Signed for Adams Street northbound, Bryant Avenue southbound
Norfolk	Milton	38.639	62.183	—	10	Squantum Street – Milton	Southbound exit only
Norfolk	Milton	39.500	63.569	—	11	Granite Avenue to Route 203 – Ashmont, East Milton	Signed as exits 11A (south) and 11B (north) southbound; no northbound access to Granite Avenue south
Suffolk	Boston	40.367	64.964	—	12	Route 3A south (Gallivan Boulevard) – Quincy, Neponset	No northbound exit
Suffolk	Boston	41.316	66.492	13	13A	Freeport Street – Dorchester	Northbound exit only
Suffolk	Boston	41.501	66.789	14	13B	Morrissey Boulevard – Savin Hill	Northbound exit and southbound entrance
Suffolk	Boston	43.021	69.236	15	14	Columbia Road – Dorchester, South Boston	
Suffolk	Boston	43.749	70.407	16	15A	Southampton Street – Andrew Square	Northbound exit and southbound entrance
Suffolk	Boston	44.163	71.073	18	15B	Frontage Road / Massachusetts Avenue – Roxbury	Signed as exit 15 southbound
Suffolk	Boston	45.109	72.596	20	16	I-90 / Mass Pike / Albany Street – Logan Airport, Worcester, South Station	South Bay interchange; signed as exits 16A (South Station) and (I-90) southbound; exits 134B-C on I-90 / Mass Pike
Suffolk	Boston	45.993	74.019	23	17	Government Center	Northbound exit and southbound entrance; access via North Street
Suffolk	Boston	46.121	74.225	23	16B	Purchase Street	Southbound exit and entrance
Suffolk	Boston	46.365	74.617	24	17	Route 1A north (Callahan Tunnel) – Logan Airport, Government Center	Southbound exit and northbound entrance; signed as exits 17A (Government) and 17B (Route 1A)
Suffolk	Boston	46.848	75.395	26	18	Route 3 north (Storrow Drive) / Route 28 – Leverett Circle, Cambridge	Northern end of Route 3 concurrency
Suffolk	Boston			Leonard P. Zakim Bunker Hill Memorial Bridge over the Charles River			
Suffolk	Boston	47.284	76.096	27	19	I-93 north – Somerville, Concord, NH	Northbound exit and southbound entrance; northern end of I-93 concurrency; last northbound exit before toll
Suffolk	Boston	47.950	77.168	—	—	Route 99 (New Rutherford Avenue) to I-93 north – Charlestown, Somerville	Southbound exit and northbound entrance
Mystic River				Tobin Bridge (toll; E-ZPass or pay-by-plate)			
Suffolk	Chelsea	49.567	79.770	—	—	Beacon Street	Northbound exit and southbound entrance
Suffolk	Chelsea	50.038	80.528	—	—	Fourth Street	Northbound exit and southbound entrance
Suffolk	Chelsea	50.323	80.987	—	—	Sixth Street	Northbound entrance only
Suffolk	Chelsea	50.618	81.462	—	—	Carter Street – Chelsea, East Boston	Southbound exit and entrance; last southbound exit before toll
Suffolk	Chelsea	51.378	82.685	—	—	Webster Avenue – Chelsea, Everett	Northbound exit and southbound entrance
Suffolk	Chelsea	51.327	82.603	—	—	Route 16 east to Route 1A – Revere Beach, Lynn	Northbound exit and southbound entrance
Suffolk	Chelsea	51.327	82.603	—	—	Route 16 west – Everett, Somerville	Southbound exit and northbound entrance
Suffolk	Revere	52.517	84.518	—	—	Sargent Street – West Revere	Northbound exit and southbound entrance
Suffolk	Revere	53.348	85.855	—	—	Route 60 (Squire Road) – Malden, Revere	Copeland Circle; roundabout interchange
Suffolk	Revere	53.854	86.670	—	—	Lynn Street – Saugus, Malden	Partial cloverleaf interchange
Middlesex	Malden			Northern end of freeway section			
Essex	Saugus	55.217	88.863			Route 99 south (Broadway) – Malden, Everett	No northbound exit; northern terminus of Route 99
Essex	Saugus	55.511	89.336			Essex Street – Saugus, Melrose	Cloverleaf interchange
Essex	Saugus	56.039	90.186			Main Street – Saugus, Wakefield	Cloverleaf interchange
Essex	Saugus	57.162	91.993			Lynn Fells Parkway west – Melrose, Stoneham	Trumpet interchange
Essex	Saugus	57.772	92.975			Route 129 west (Walnut Street) – Lynn, Wakefield, Reading	Cloverleaf interchange; southern end of Route 129 concurrency
Essex	Lynnfield	59.728	96.123			Route 129 east (Salem Street) – Lynn, Swampscott	Diamond interchange; northern end of Route 129 concurrency
Essex	Peabody	60.492	97.352			To I-95 / Route 128 – Waltham	Interchange
Essex	Peabody	61.946	99.692			I-95 north – Portsmouth, NH, Maine	Northbound exit and southbound entrance; exit 66 on I-95
Essex	Peabody	62.327	100.306			Lowell Street – Peabody	Partial cloverleaf interchange
Essex	Danvers	63.233	101.764			I-95 / Route 114 (Andover Street) – Peabody, Middleton	Cloverleaf interchange; I-95 not signed
Essex	Danvers	63.848	102.753			Centre Street – Danvers	Partial cloverleaf interchange
Essex	Danvers	64.902	104.450			Route 62 (Maple Street) – Danvers, Middleton	Cloverleaf interchange
Essex	Danvers	65.598	105.570			I-95 – Boston, Portsmouth, NH	Exit 70 on I-95
Essex	Topsfield	68.782	110.694			Route 97 (High Street) – Topsfield Center, Haverhill, Beverly	
Essex	Rowley	73.819	118.800			Route 133 (Haverhill Street) – Rowley, Ipswich, Gloucester, Georgetown, North Andover	
Essex	Newburyport	81.623	131.359			Route 1A south / Route 113 west (Merrimac Street) – Downtown Newburyport	Diamond interchange; southern end of Route 1A concurrency; eastern terminus of Route 113
Essex	Salisbury	83.633	134.594			Route 110 west (School Street) to I-95 / I-495 – Amesbury, Haverhill	Eastern terminus of Route 110
Essex	Salisbury	83.809	134.878			Route 1A north (Beach Road) – Salisbury Beach	Northern end of Route 1A concurrency
Essex	Salisbury	85.953	138.328			Route 286 (Forrest Street) – Amesbury, Seabrook, NH, Hampton Beach	
Essex	Salisbury	86.253	138.811			US 1 north – Seabrook	Continuation into New Hampshire
1.000 mi = 1.609 km; 1.000 km = 0.621 mi: Concurrency terminus; Electronic toll collection; Incomplete access; Route transition

== See also ==
- New England road marking system
- List of U.S. Highways in Massachusetts

U.S. Route 1
Previous state: Rhode Island	Massachusetts	Next state: New Hampshire
