= Interstate 95 in Massachusetts =

Highway in Massachusetts, United States

Interstate 95
- I-95 highlighted in red

Route information
- Maintained by MassDOT
- Length: 91.95 mi (147.98 km)
- Existed: 1957–present
- NHS: Entire route

Major junctions
- South end: I-95 at the Rhode Island state line in Pawtucket, RI
- US 1 in Attleboro; I-295 in Attleboro; I-495 in Mansfield; US 1 in Sharon; I-93 / US 1 in Canton; I-90 Toll / Mass Pike / Route 30 in Weston; US 20 in Waltham; Route 2 in Lexington; US 3 / Route 3A in Burlington; I-93 in Reading; I-495 in Salisbury
- North end: I-95 at the New Hampshire state line in Seabrook, NH

Location
- Country: United States
- State: Massachusetts
- Counties: Bristol, Norfolk, Middlesex, Essex

Highway system
- Interstate Highway System; Main; Auxiliary; Suffixed; Business; Future; Massachusetts State Highway System; Interstate; US; State
← I-93	→ Route 96

Interstate 95 (I-95) is a part of the Interstate Highway System that parallels the East Coast of the United States from Miami, Florida, in the south to Houlton, Maine, in the north. In the US state of Massachusetts, it spans 92 miles (148 km) along a north–south axis. It is the third-longest Interstate Highway in Massachusetts, behind I-90 (the Massachusetts Turnpike) and I-495, while I-95 in full is the longest north–south Interstate and sixth-longest Interstate Highway in the US.

Its southern terminus within the state is located in Attleboro, where I-95 enters from Pawtucket, Rhode Island. It intersects with US Route 1 (US 1) and the northern terminus of I-295 within Attleboro, I-495 in Mansfield, and US 1 in Sharon before arriving at an interchange with I-93, US 1, and Route 128 in Canton. At this interchange, I-95 begins running concurrently with US 1 and Route 128 along a beltway roughly 15 miles (24 km) outside of Boston. While earlier plans called for I-95 to run northeastward through Boston along the Southwest Corridor and a more northerly portion of Route 1 known as the Northeast Expressway, these plans were ultimately cancelled due to fierce community opposition. As such, Boston is one of only two major east coast cities that I-95 bypasses (the other, Washington, DC, for the same reason).

While its concurrency with US 1 ends in Dedham, its concurrency with Route 128 continues as it meets with expressways including the Massachusetts Turnpike in Weston, US 20 in Waltham, Route 2 in Lexington, US 3 in Burlington (with which it runs concurrently within the town), and I-93 and US 1 in Reading and Lynnfield, respectively. I-95 and Route 128 split in Peabody, as Route 128 travels northeast toward its northern terminus in Gloucester, I-95 continues north and crosses US 1 in Peabody and Danvers. Within Salisbury, it intersects the northern terminus of I-495 and arrives at its own northern terminus, where I-95 continues into Seabrook, New Hampshire, as the Blue Star Turnpike.

== Route description ==
=== Attleboro to Canton ===
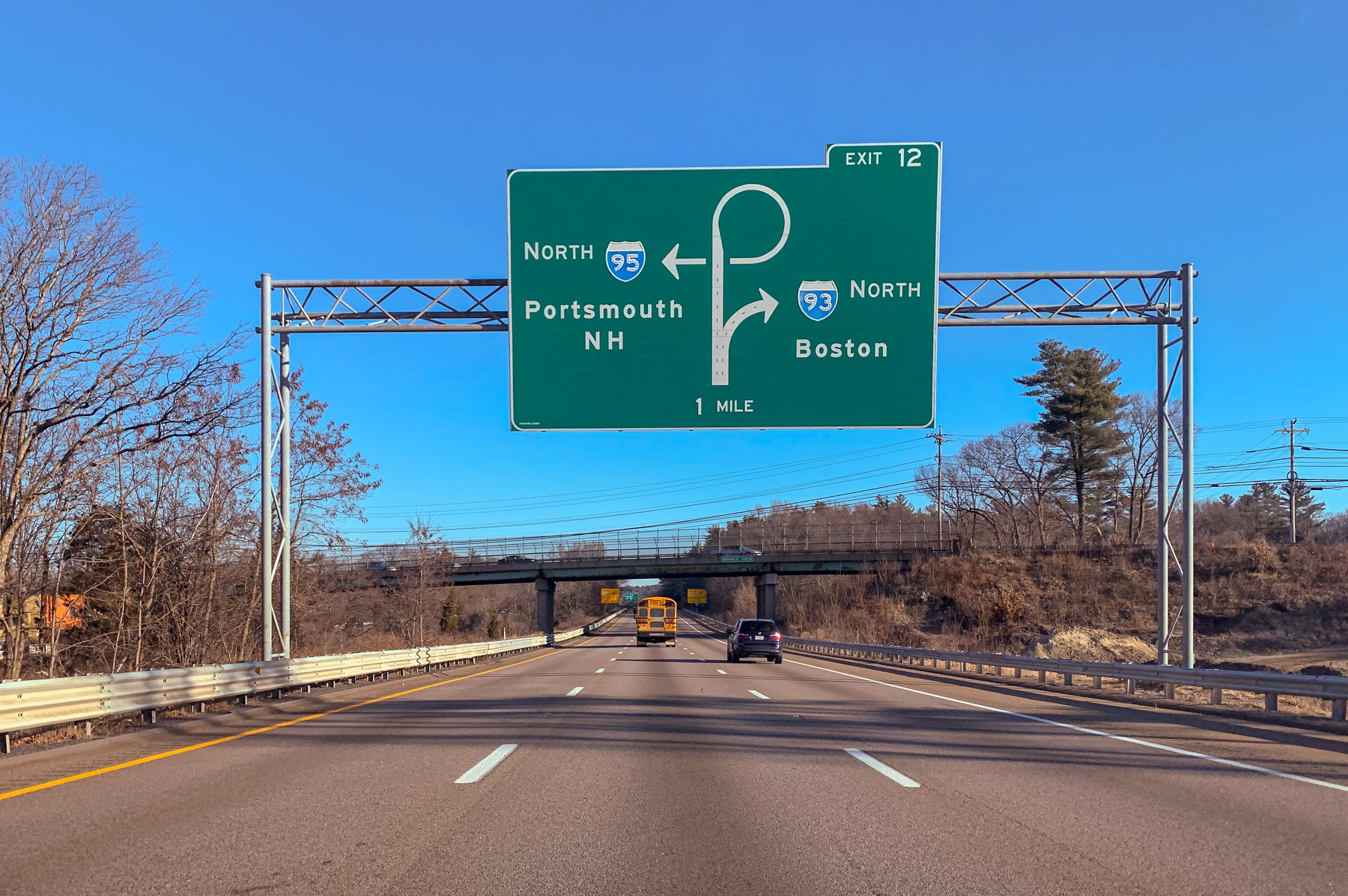
To continue on I-95 northbound, motorists must make a sharp clockwise curve at exit 26 (old exit 12) in Canton.

I-95 crosses the state border from Pawtucket, Rhode Island, into Attleboro as a six-lane highway, with the first northbound exits, 2A and 2B, providing access to Route 1A and nearby US 1 near the border. (There is an exit 1, but it is a southbound-only exit connecting to US 1 south into Rhode Island). Exits 4–7 (old exits 3–5) also serve the Attleboro area, with exit 6 (old exit 4) at the northern terminus of I-295.

Exits 12A and 12B (old exits 6A and 6B) in Mansfield provide access to I-495, the "outer circumferential" beltway around Greater Boston. I-495 provides northbound connections to Worcester, the Massachusetts Turnpike, and the western part of the state, and southbound connections to Cape Cod. Mansfield is home to the Xfinity Center, a Live Nation Entertainment-owned amphitheater that hosts numerous concert events, and TPC Boston, a PGA Tour player's club that hosted the Dell Technologies Championship yearly. The two venues are located near I-95's interchanges with Route 140. This exit also provides access to Gillette Stadium and the town of Foxborough from areas to the south.

I-95 continues northward into Sharon, it interchanges with US Route 1 at exit 19 (old exit 9), which provides access to the stadium from the north. It then enters Greater Boston and the towns of Walpole, and Norwood, before entering Canton, where it meets I-93 at its southern terminus, and I-93 continues as exit 26 (old exit 12) to the right of I-95, while I-95 traffic is routed in a single lane to a sharp clockwise curve where it meets US 1 in a wrong-way concurrency.

=== Canton to Peabody (Route 128) ===
Upon interchanging with I-93, I-95 loops around to the west, taking over the roadbed from I-93 (now four lanes) and joining US 1 southbound in a wrong-way concurrency. Route 128 begins here as well. The highway enters Westwood next, with US 1 leaving the freeway near the Dedham town line to parallel I-95 back to the south. I-95 and Route 128 makes its way around Greater Boston, passing through Dedham, Needham, and Wellesley, where the freeway has an interchange with Route 9, and the freeway widens to eight lanes. Then, the highway passes through Newton, then enters Weston and has a large interchange with the Massachusetts Turnpike (I-90) that provides connections to nearby Route 30. With the exception of between the I-90 on- and offramps, this portion of I-95 is four lanes in each direction.

I-95 and Route 128 are due west of Boston at this point and begin to turn to the northeast, serving the city of Waltham and the town of Lexington along the way. The freeway has an interchange with Route 2 (Concord Turnpike) at exit 45 (old exit 29). Upon entering the town of Burlington, I-95 and Route 128 have an interchange with US 3, the Northwest Expressway, at exit 50A (old exit 32A). US 3 provides a direct freeway connection with the Lowell–Nashua, New Hampshire, metro area. Access to the Middlesex Turnpike and Burlington retail district is facilitated at this interchange as well. US 3 south briefly joins the freeway in another wrong-way multiplex in order to connect with its old alignment, leaving at exit 51A (old exit 33A). I-95 and Route 128 continue northeast through the city of Woburn and into Reading.

In Reading, I-95 and Route 128 once again have an interchange with I-93. After crossing I-93, the now six-lane highway continues to the northeast, serving the towns of Wakefield, Lynnfield, and Lynn before crossing into Peabody, where Route 128 leaves I-95 at exit 64 (old exit 45) via the three left-most lanes as its own freeway toward Gloucester, while I-95 continues as the two right-most lanes in a somewhat sharp counterclockwise (albeit the fact that it contains two lanes) loop.

=== Peabody to Salisbury ===
After leaving Route 128, I-95 expands back to six lanes and then to eight lanes at the partial interchange with US 1 (exit 66, old exit 46) about one mile (1.6 km) north of Route 128 and heads north through the less densely populated northeastern portion of the state. The freeway serves the communities of Danvers, Boxford, Topsfield, Georgetown, Rowley, Newbury, West Newbury, Newburyport, Amesbury, and Salisbury. Traffic density is generally low on this 25-mile (40 km) stretch of freeway.

I-495 has its northern terminus at I-95 exit 89 (old exit 59) just south of the New Hampshire state line, a Y interchange that merges I-495 onto I-95. Northbound access to I-495 south is possible via exit 58 for Route 110 westbound, which leads to I-495's exit 119 (old exit 55) (I-495's last northbound exit before I-95). The northernmost exit in Massachusetts is exit 90 (old exit 60), providing access to Main Street toward Amesbury and Route 286 toward Salisbury Beach and Hampton Beach (the southbound ramp starts in New Hampshire). After crossing underneath the connecting roads, I-95 crosses the state line into Seabrook, New Hampshire.

== Facilities and speed limits ==
=== Rest areas and service plazas ===
This is a list of rest areas on I-95 in Massachusetts:

- Mansfield Rest Area (milepost 10): It is northbound only between exits 7, 12A, and 12B (old exits 5, 6A, and 6B) and has portable restrooms, phones, and a picnic area.
- North Attleborough Parking Area (milepost 10): It is southbound only between exits 12A, 12B, and 7 (old exits 6 and 5) and has a parking area and phones.
- Westwood Rest Area (milepost 29): It is southbound only between exits 28 and 27 (old exits 14 and 13) and has restrooms, phones, and a picnic area.
- Dedham Truck turnout: It is southbound only between exits 32, 31A, and 31B (old exits 17, 16A, and 16B) and parking only with no facilities.
- Newton Service Plaza: It is southbound only near exit 37 (old exit 21) and has 24-hour food and fuel with McDonald's and Honey Dew Donuts.
- Lexington Service Plaza: It is northbound only near exits 46A and 46B (old exits 30A and 30B) and has 24-hour food and fuel with McDonald's, Honey Dew Donuts, and Original Pizza of Boston.
- Massachusetts Visitor Center (milepost 90): It is southbound only at the New Hampshire state line (exit 90, old exit 60) and has tourist information, restrooms, and phones.

=== Weigh stations ===
Weigh stations are located on the northbound and southbound sides of the highway at the following locations:

- In Attleboro between exits 2 and 4 (old exit 3).
- In Rowley between exits 76A, 76B, and 78 (old exits 53A, 53B, and 54).

=== Speed limits ===
Between the Rhode Island state line and I-93 in Canton, and again between the northern end of the beltway and the New Hampshire state line, the speed limit is 65 mph (105 km/h). After leaving Route 128, I-95 expands to eight lanes and heads north through the less densely populated northeastern portion of the state hence why the speed limit increases to 65 mph from Peabody to the New Hampshire border crossing through more rural areas in northeastern Massachusetts, including Georgetown, Massachusetts, Rowley, Massachusetts, Newbury, Massachusetts and others in Salisbury. The sharp transition curve from I-95 north onto the Route 128 beltway in Canton is posted for 25 mph (40 km/h). Along the beltway, the speed limit is 55 mph (89 km/h), and the speed limit on the transition ramps at exit 64 (old exit 45) at the I-95/Route 128 split in Peabody is 45 mph (72 km/h) northbound and 50 mph (80 km/h) southbound before increasing to 65 mph from that point on until it reaches the New Hampshire border in Salisbury, Massachusetts.

== History ==
The original plans called for I-95 to run through downtown Boston. The highway would have progressed from Route 128 and Readville, followed the Southwest Corridor, ran along Melnea Cass Boulevard in Roxbury, heading east, and joining the Southeast Expressway at South Bay, then north to the Central Artery at the South Station interchange with the Massachusetts Turnpike/I-90, and connecting with the Northeast Expressway at the Charlestown banks of the Charles River.

However, due to pressure from local residents, all proposed Interstate Highways within Route 128 were canceled in 1972 by Governor Francis Sargent with the exception of I-93 to Boston. The only section of I-95 completed within the Route 128 beltway by the Massachusetts Department of Transportation (MassDOT) was the segment from Saugus to the Massachusetts Avenue Connector in Roxbury. The Southwest Expressway and the Inner Belt highways were among the Sargent-canceled highways.

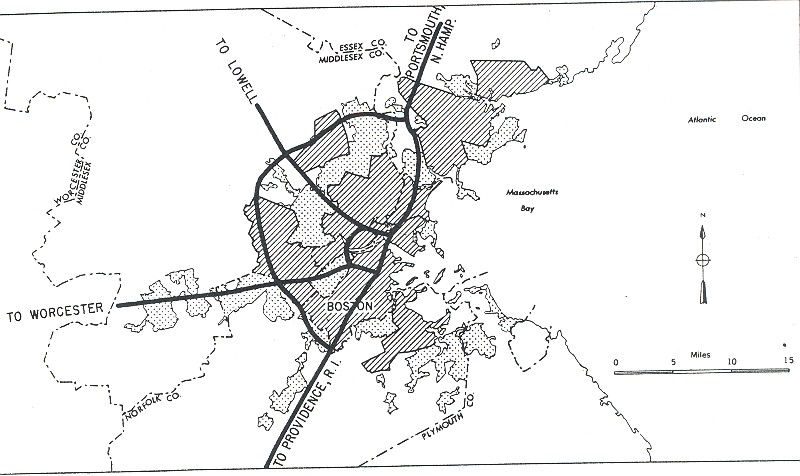
Original 1955 Yellow Book plan showing the southwestern routing of I-95 to the Inner Belt. The modern I-95 follows the outer belt shown on this map (now considered the "inner" Route 128 compared to the "outer" I-495 which is not shown, and which started construction two years after the study).

Between 1972 and 1974, plans were to extend I-95 along a northerly extension of the Northeast Expressway to Route 128 in northwestern Danvers. During this time, I-95 was officially routed along Route 128 from Canton to Braintree and north along the Southeast Expressway (also designated Route 3), from Braintree to Boston, then following the Central Artery, and continuing along the Northeast Expressway in Boston, Chelsea, and Revere.

When the Northeast Expressway extension (between Saugus and Danvers) was canceled in 1974, I-95's route shifted to its current routing along the perimeter highway (Route 128), and I-93 was extended to meet I-95 in Canton. For several decades, plans for the abandoned roadways could still be seen going from the end of the Northeast Expressway to the Saugus River in Saugus in the form of a graded but unpaved roadbed. Much of this was removed during the early 2000s. At the US 1/Route 60 interchange, one can still see unused bridges and ghost ramps that were originally intended to carry I-95.

MassDOT's Add-A-Lane project added a fourth lane in each direction along Route 128/I-95 from the I-93 interchange in Canton to the Route 9 interchange in Wellesley, where the rush-hour traffic has been for some time permitted to use the breakdown lanes on the highway shoulder. The section south of Route 9 was completed by late 2015, and the last section, from Needham to Wellesley, where construction started in 2015, was completed in 2019. Outside of Route 128, the state began a $285-million (equivalent to $350 million in 2024) project in 2012 to replace the John Greenleaf Whittier Bridge over the Merrimack River which included widening the highway to eight lanes (four in each direction) from the bridge to I-495. This project was substantially completed, and the full eight lanes opened in mid-2018.

=== Add-A-Lane project ===
The $315-million (equivalent to $432 million in 2024) MassDOT Highway Division project widened the 14.3-mile (23.0 km), six-lane section of highway to eight lanes from north of Route 9 in Wellesley to Route 24 in Randolph. The project consisted of adding a lane on the inside of each carriageway, complete with a 10-foot (3.0 m) inside shoulder. The existing 1950s bridges, 22 in total, were replaced. The project included construction of a new two-lane ramp from Route 128 to I-95 in Canton and installation of a new interchange at Kendrick Street in Needham, designated as exit 35A (old exit 19A) with the ramps to Highland Avenue as exits 35B–C (old exits 19B–C).

During the initial construction of I-95, a provision had already been made for a fourth lane within the widely spaced median along the 1.5-mile (2.4 km) length of I-95 running from just north of the US 1 interchange in Dedham northwestward to the Route 109 interchange, and this would finally be used for the Add-A-Lane project.

Construction on phase 1 was officially completed in October 2009. Construction of phase 2 of the project began in mid-2006. This phase of the project consisted of the replacement of the US 1 and Route 1A bridges over I-95 in Dedham along with the road widening between exits 27, 29A, and 29B (old exits 13, 15A, and 15B). Construction of four sound barriers between the US 1 and I-93 interchanges were also included. This phase was completed in early 2011.

== Exit list ==
Massachusetts converted from sequential to distance-based exit numbering on I-95 in 2021. Exits 1, 2A, and 2B retained their numbers (Massachusetts opted not to use the number 0 for numbering exits).

County	Location	mi	km	Old exit	New exit	Destinations	Notes
Bristol	Attleboro	0.000	0.000	—	—	I-95 south – Providence	Continuation into Rhode Island
Bristol	Attleboro	0.499	0.803	1	1	US 1 south (Broadway) – Pawtucket, RI	Southbound exit and northbound entrance
Bristol	Attleboro	1.199– 1.213	1.930– 1.952	2	2	Route 1A (Newport Avenue) to US 1 – Pawtucket RI, South Attleboro	Signed as exits 2A (US 1 south) and 2B (US 1 north)
Bristol	Attleboro	4.197	6.754	3	4	Route 123 – Attleboro, South Attleboro	Signed as exits 4A (Route 123 east) and 4B (Route 123 west) southbound
Bristol	Attleboro	5.860	9.431	4	6	I-295 south – Woonsocket, RI, Warwick, RI	Northern terminus and exits 4A and 4B on I-295
Bristol	North Attleboro	6.918	11.133	5	7	To Route 152 – Attleboro, North Attleboro	Partially in Attleboro
Bristol	Mansfield	11.562– 11.604	18.607– 18.675	6	12	I-495 – Cape Cod, Marlboro	Signed as exits 12A (I-495 south) and 12B (I-495 north); exits 33A and 33B on I-495; partially in Foxborough
Norfolk	Foxboro	12.944	20.831	7	13	Route 140 – Mansfield, Foxboro	Signed as exits 13A (Route 140 south) to Route 106 and 13B (Route 140 north)
Norfolk	Sharon	16.626	26.757	8	17	South Main Street / Mechanic Street – Sharon, Foxboro	
Norfolk	Sharon	19.215	30.924	9	19	US 1 to Route 27 – Walpole, Foxboro, Wrentham	Route 27 not signed southbound; access to Gillette Stadium and Patriot Place
Norfolk	Walpole	21.096	33.951	10	21	Coney Street / Norwood Street – Walpole, Sharon	Southbound exit and northbound entrance
Norfolk	Norwood	23.269	37.448	11	23	Neponset Street – Canton, Norwood	Signed as exits 23A (Canton east) and 23B (Norwood west)
Norfolk	Canton	24.8	39.9	—	25	Dedham Street – Westwood, Canton	Northbound exit and southbound entrance
Norfolk	Canton	26.740	43.034	12	26	I-93 north / US 1 north – Boston Route 128 begins	Southern end of US 1 concurrency; left exit southbound; southern terminus and exits 1B and 1A on I-93; southern terminus of Route 128
Norfolk	Dedham	27.352	44.019	13	27	University Avenue – MBTA / Amtrak Station	
Norfolk	Westwood	28.627	46.071	14	28	East Street / Canton Street	
Norfolk	Dedham	29.308	47.167	15	29	US 1 south to Route 1A – Dedham, Norwood	Signed as exits 29A (Route 1A) and 29B (US 1); northern end of US 1 concurrency
Norfolk	Dedham	30.823	49.605	16	31	Route 109 – Dedham, Westwood	Signed as exits 31A (Route 109 east) and 31B (Route 109 west)
Norfolk	Dedham	32.388	52.123	17	32	Route 135 west – Needham, Dedham	Eastern terminus of Route 135
Norfolk	Needham	32.873	52.904	18	33	Great Plain Avenue – West Roxbury	
Norfolk	Needham			19A	35A	Kendrick Street – Needham	
Norfolk	Needham	35.730	57.502	19	35B-C	Highland Avenue – Newton Highlands, Needham	Signed as exits 35B (Newton Highlands east) and 35C (Needham west)
Norfolk	Wellesley	36.798	59.221	20	36	Route 9 – Brookline, Framingham	Signed as exits 36A (Route 9 east) and 36B (Route 9 west)
Middlesex	Newton	38.175	61.437	21	37	Route 16 – Newton, Wellesley	Signed as exits 37A (Route 16 east) and 37B (Route 16 west) southbound
Middlesex	Newton	38.519	61.990	22	38	Grove Street – MBTA Station	
Middlesex	Weston	38.977	62.727	23	—	Recreation Road	Northbound exit and entrance
Middlesex	Weston	39.240– 39.406	63.151– 63.418	25	39B	I-90 Toll / Mass Pike – Boston, Albany, NY	Exit 123A on I-90 / Mass Pike
Middlesex	Weston	39.240– 39.406	63.151– 63.418	24	39A	Route 30 – Newton, Weston	
Middlesex	Waltham	41.406	66.636	26	41	US 20 – Waltham, Weston	To Route 117
Middlesex	Waltham	43.279	69.651	27	43	Third Avenue / Totten Pond Road / Winter Street	Signed as exits 43A (Totten Pond/Third) and 43B (Winter) southbound; no northbound access to Totten Pond/Winter
Middlesex	Waltham			27	43	To Totten Pond Road / Winter Street	Northbound exit only; access via Wyman Street
Middlesex	Waltham	44.543	71.685	28	44	Trapelo Road – Belmont, Lincoln	Signed as exits 44A (Belmont east) and 44B (Lincoln west) northbound
Middlesex	Lexington	45.429	73.111	29	45	Route 2 – Cambridge, Boston, Acton, Fitchburg	Signed as exits 45A (Route 2 east) and 45B (Route 2 west); exits 127A and 127B on Route 2
Middlesex	Lexington	46.492	74.822	30	46	Route 2A – East Lexington, Hanscom Field, Concord	Signed as exits 46A (Route 2A east) and 46B (Route 2A west)
Middlesex	Lexington	48.716	78.401	31	49	Route 4 / Route 225 – Lexington, Bedford	Signed as exits 49A (4 south/225 east) and 49B (4 north/225 west)
Middlesex	Burlington	50.079	80.594	32A	50A	US 3 north – Lowell, Nashua, NH	Southern end of US 3 concurrency; exit 72B on US 3
Middlesex	Burlington	50.341	81.016	32B	50B	Middlesex Turnpike – Burlington	
Middlesex	Burlington	51.773	83.321	33	51	US 3 south / Route 3A north – Winchester, Burlington	Signed as exits 51A (US 3 south) and 51B (US 3 north); northern end of US 3 concurrency; southern terminus of Route 3A
Middlesex	Burlington	52.639	84.714	34	52	Winn Street – Woburn, Burlington	
Middlesex	Woburn	53.735	86.478	35	53	Route 38 – Woburn, Wilmington	
Middlesex	Woburn	55.128	88.720	36	54	Washington Street – Woburn, Reading	
Middlesex	Reading	55.717	89.668	37	55	I-93 – Boston, Concord, NH	Signed as exits 55A (I-93 south) and 55B (I-93 north); exits 28A and 28B on I-93
Middlesex	Reading	56.561	91.026	38	56	Route 28 – Stoneham, Reading	Signed as exits 56A (Route 28 south) and 56B (Route 28 north)
Middlesex	Wakefield	57.779	92.986	39	57	North Avenue – Reading; Walkers Brook Drive – Wakefield	
Middlesex	Wakefield	58.532	94.198	40	58	Route 129 – Reading, Wakefield Center	
Essex	Lynnfield	59.296	95.428	41	59	Main Street – Lynnfield Center; Vernon Street – Wakefield	
Middlesex	Wakefield	60.859	97.943	42	60	Salem Street – Wakefield	
Essex	Lynnfield	61.510	98.991	43	61	Walnut Street – Saugus, Lynnfield	
Essex	Lynnfield			44A	63A	US 1 / Route 129 – Boston	Northbound exit only
Essex	Peabody	62.899	101.226	44B	63B	To US 1 / Route 129 – Danvers, Boston, Lynn	Signed as exit 63 southbound; no southbound access to Route 129; signed for Boston southbound, Lynn northbound
Essex	Peabody	64.625	104.004	45	64	Route 128 north – Gloucester	Northern end of Route 128 concurrency; left exit northbound; exit 37 on Route 128
Essex	Peabody	66.098	106.374	46	66	US 1 south – Boston	Southbound exit and northbound entrance
Essex	Danvers	67.329	108.356	47	67	US 1 / Route 114 – Peabody, Middleton	Signed as exits 67A (Route 114 east) and 67B (Route 114 west); US 1 not signed; no southbound exit
Essex	Danvers	68.226	109.799	48	68	Centre Street – Danvers	Southbound exit and entrance
Essex	Danvers	68.979	111.011	49	69	Route 62 – Danvers, Middleton	Northbound exit and southbound entrance
Essex	Danvers	69.851– 69.867	112.414– 112.440	50	70	US 1 to Route 62 / Route 114 – Topsfield, Danvers	Route 62/Route 114/Danvers not signed northbound
Essex	Boxford	72.277	116.319	51	72	Endicott Road – Topsfield, Middleton	
Essex	Boxford	73.979	119.058	52	74	Topsfield Road – Topsfield, Boxford	
Essex	Boxford	76.201	122.634	53	76	Route 97 – Topsfield, Georgetown	Signed as exits 76A (Route 97 south) and 76B (Route 97 north)
Essex	Georgetown	78.051	125.611	54	78	Route 133 – Georgetown, Rowley	Signed as exits 78A (Route 133 east) and 78B (Route 133 west) northbound
Essex	Newbury	81.542	131.229	55	81	Central Street – Byfield, Newbury	
Essex	West Newbury	83.362	134.158	56	83	Scotland Road – Newbury, West Newbury	
Essex	Newburyport	86.044	138.474	57	86	Route 113 – West Newbury, Newburyport	
Essex	Merrimack River	87.189– 87.377	140.317– 140.620	John Greenleaf Whittier Bridge			
Essex	Amesbury	88.124	141.822	58	88	Route 110 to I-495 south – Salisbury, Amesbury	Signed as exits 88A (Route 110 east) and 88B (Route 110 west) northbound; I-495 not signed southbound
Essex	Salisbury	89.367	143.822	59	89	I-495 south – Worcester	Southbound exit and northbound entrance; northern terminus of I-495
Massachusetts–New Hampshire line		90.239– 90.82	145.226– 146.16	60	90	Route 286 east – Beaches, Salisbury	Southbound exit originates in New Hampshire; western terminus of Route 286
Massachusetts–New Hampshire line		90.239– 90.82	145.226– 146.16	—	—	I-95 north – Portsmouth	Continuation into New Hampshire
1.000 mi = 1.609 km; 1.000 km = 0.621 mi: Concurrency terminus; Electronic toll collection; Incomplete access; Unopened

== Auxiliary routes ==
- I-195 runs from I-95 in Providence to I-495/Route 25 in the Cape Cod region.
- I-295 runs as a loop around Providence, and ends at I-95 in Massachusetts.
- I-395 runs from I-95/Connecticut Turnpike in East Lyme, and ends at I-90, where it becomes I-290.
- I-495 serves as an outer beltway of Boston, and is the second longest auxiliary interstate highway.

Interstate 95
Previous state: Rhode Island	Massachusetts	Next state: New Hampshire
