= Massachusetts Route 128A =

Former state highway in Massachusetts, US

Route 128A

Route information
- Maintained by MassDOT

Location
- Country: United States
- State: Massachusetts

Highway system
- Massachusetts State Highway System; Interstate; US; State
← Route 128	→ Route 129

The Route 128A designation was used in the 1950s along the old sections of Route 128 as sections of the Yankee Division Highway were put into service. 128A was in Wakefield, Reading and Woburn This route no longer exists.
