= Interstate 495 (Massachusetts) =

Highway in Massachusetts

Interstate 495
- Blue Star Memorial Highway
- I-495 highlighted in red

Route information
- Auxiliary route of I-95
- Maintained by MassDOT
- Length: 121.56 mi (195.63 km)
- Existed: 1957–present
- NHS: Entire route

Major junctions
- South end: I-195 / Route 25 in Wareham
- US 44 / Route 18 in Middleborough; Route 24 at the Bridgewater- Raynham line; I-95 at the Mansfield-Foxboro line; US 1 in Plainville; I-90 / Mass Pike at the Hopkinton–Westborough line; Route 9 in Westborough; US 20 in Marlborough; I-290 in Marlborough; Route 2 in Littleton; US 3 / Lowell Connector in Chelmsford/Lowell; I-93 in Andover
- North end: I-95 in Salisbury

Location
- Country: United States
- State: Massachusetts
- Counties: Plymouth, Bristol, Norfolk, Worcester, Middlesex, Essex

Highway system
- Interstate Highway System; Main; Auxiliary; Suffixed; Business; Future; Massachusetts State Highway System; Interstate; US; State
← I-395	→ I-695

Interstate 495 (I-495) is an auxiliary route of I-95 in the US state of Massachusetts, maintained by the Massachusetts Department of Transportation (MassDOT). Spanning 121.56 miles (195.63 km), it is the second-longest auxiliary route in the Interstate Highway System, being roughly 11 miles (18 km) shorter than I-476 in Pennsylvania.

Serving as one of two beltways (the other being Route 128) that forms a semicircle around Boston, and being the outer beltway, I-495 has its northern terminus in Salisbury, where it splits from I-95. Its route forms an arc with an approximately 30-mile (48 km) radius around the city and intersects seven additional radial expressways: I-93, US Route 3 (US 3), Route 2, I-290, I-90 (Massachusetts Turnpike), Route 24, and I-95 once more. I-495 has its southern terminus in Wareham, at the meeting of I-195 and Route 25. Originally, the stretch from Route 24 to I-195 was signed as Route 25, that status now only begins east of I-195.

I-495 and areas to its immediate east are often regarded as the inner ring of Greater Boston. The freeway's northern segment parallels the New Hampshire border, at one point coming as close as 400 feet (120 m) to the boundary, and its southern end is roughly 10 miles (16 km) north of Cape Cod. West of I-495 is the Worcester area and Central Massachusetts. I-495 is a heavily traveled route serving communities in Plymouth, Bristol, Norfolk, Worcester, Essex, and Middlesex counties.

== Route description ==
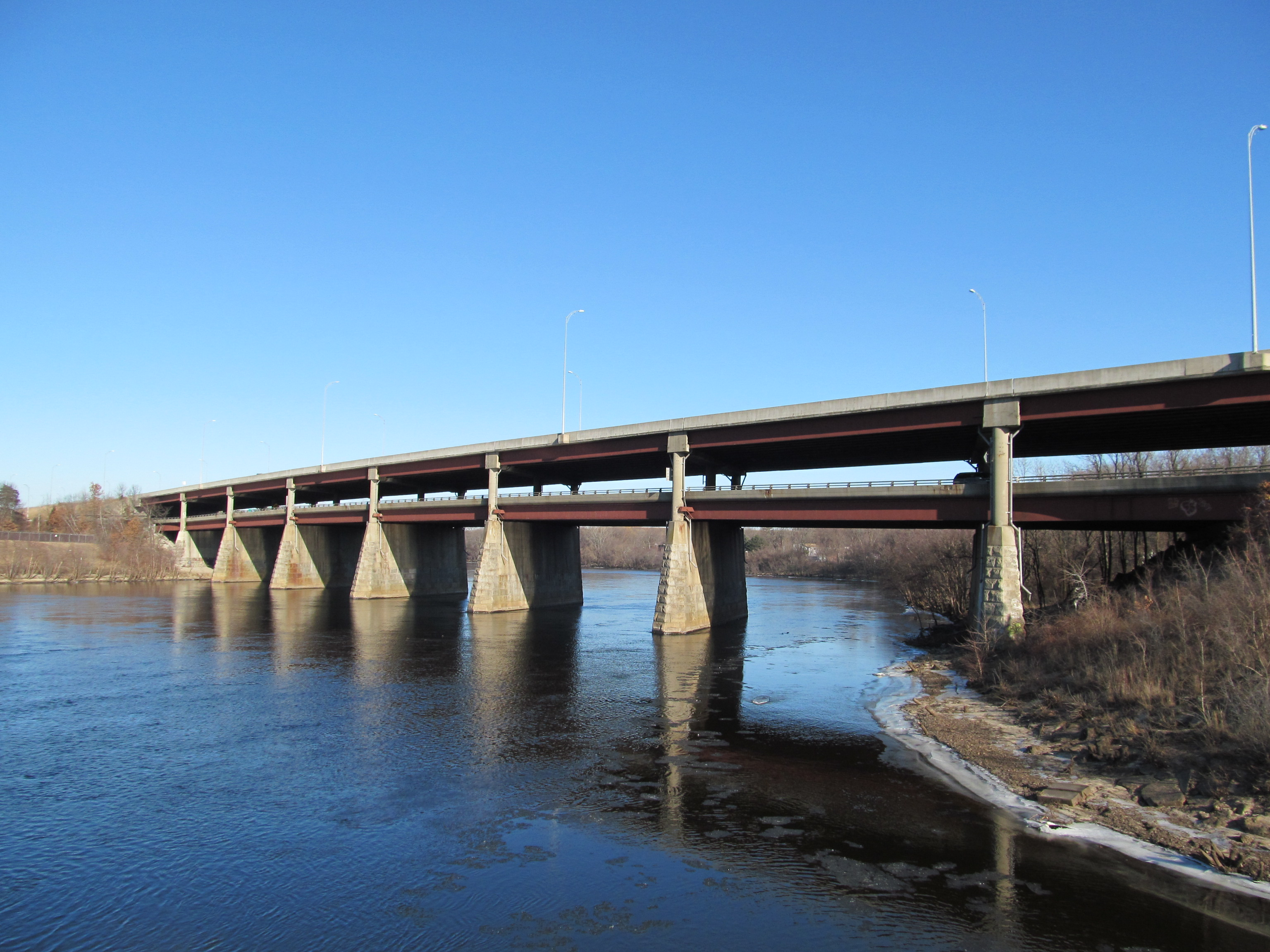
I-495 bridge over the Merrimack River in Lawrence

I-495 begins as the direct continuation of Route 25 at the intersection with I-195 in West Wareham. It starts as a two-lane highway in both directions. It gets the third lane during the interchange with Route 24. The junction includes the unusual transition of shrinking from the six-lane Route 25 to the four-lane interstate due to the third lane of Route 25 joining to and from I-195. The road heads roughly northwest, passing through the towns of Rochester and Middleborough (where the road meets US 44) as a four-lane highway before entering Bristol County, crossing the Taunton River at Raynham. I-495 becomes a six-lane highway just southeast of the Route 24 interchange (which is actually in neighboring Bridgewater).

The road continues northwest through Taunton and Norton before entering Mansfield, where there is a short collector–distributor road concurrency with Route 140. I-495 makes its southern junction with its parent route, I-95, on the border between Mansfield in Bristol County and Foxborough in Norfolk County. The road continues through Plainville (where there is a junction with US 1). The highway comes within two miles (3.2 km) of the Rhode Island state line before turning in a more northerly direction through Franklin and Bellingham.

I-495 passes through Milford, Medway, Hopkinton (where the junction with the Massachusetts Turnpike, or I-90, is located), and Westborough (where the road meets Route 9). It then continues through Southborough, Marlborough (where the road meets US 20 and I-290), Hudson, Berlin, Bolton (where the road finally begins to turn northeasterly), and Harvard. The Harold E. Brown Jr. Memorial Bridge on I-495 over Massachusetts Route 117 in Bolton was dedicated in October 2012 in honor of Brown Jr, a CIA officer who was killed in the 2009 Camp Chapman attack.

Continuing to turn to a more easterly direction, the road passes through Boxborough, Littleton (where there is an intersection with Route 2), Westford and Chelmsford. At the Chelmsford–Lowell line lies the intersection with US 3 and the Lowell Connector (formerly I-495 Business). The road continues through Lowell and Tewksbury before entering Essex County at Andover, directly at exit 94 (formerly exit 39).

In Andover, the road has a junction with I-93. It then enters the city of Lawrence, where the road turns due north, crossing the Shawsheen River into North Andover before crossing the Merrimack River at the O'Reilly Bridge back into Lawrence. It then heads into Methuen, where the road turns back to a northeasterly route after the junction with Route 213 (Loop Connector). The road heads into Haverhill, crossing the Merrimack twice more at a bend in the Bradford section of town. It passes north of downtown Haverhill, coming within 150 yards (140 m) of the New Hampshire state line, the closest the road comes to leaving the state. I-495 then passes through the towns of Merrimac and Amesbury before entering Salisbury where it immediately meets I-95 and ends approximately 1.5 miles (2.4 km) south of where that Interstate enters New Hampshire.

Throughout its path, the road passes closely to several existing state highways. From Wareham through to the Middleborough Rotary, it parallels Route 28. For much of the stretch between Norton and Milford, the road is within a few miles of Route 140, with two junctions of that highway in Mansfield and Franklin. From Milford to Bolton, the road passes just west of Route 85. Much of the northern third of the route also roughly parallels Route 110.

== History ==
As early as the late 1940s, a plan was developing for an "outer circumferential highway" around Boston, a limited-access freeway meant to have an approximate 30-mile (48 km) radius from the Boston city center. A portion of this new "outer circumferential highway" southeast of the US 1 junction in Foxborough was meant to be a "relocation" of the existing Route 28, which was quickly changed in 1947 to a new designation of Route 25 as a full-length freeway from the Route 24 expressway in Raynham to Wareham. The section of I-495 between Route 24 in Raynham and I-95 at the Foxborough–Mansfield town line began construction at I-95 in 1976 and finished at the Route 25/Route 24 interchange in 1982. (Prior to 1982, I-495 ended at I-95; the section from Raynham to Wareham was just signed as Route 25). Route 25 was constructed in stages from the late 1950s to the late 1960s.

== Future ==
In 2014, a new intelligent transportation system was installed to help commuters and the state better understand the traffic congestion on I-495. Some improvements expected to come to I-495 in the next few years include a project that will install fiber-optic cable, traffic cameras, and variable-message signs on I-495 from I-90 (Hopkinton) to I-93 (Andover).

=== Massachusetts Turnpike interchange ===
In 2015, the state pledged $165 million to 285 million (equivalent to $213 million to $367 million in 2024) for improvements to the I-495/Massachusetts Turnpike intersection and is considering three different plans. The work is expected to begin in 2021 and be completed in 2025. Improvements to the I-495/Route 9 intersection will commence at the same duration, with a different budget. Construction is in progress and is expected to be completed in 2027

== Exit list ==
Interchanges were to be renumbered to mileage-based numbers under a project scheduled to start in 2016; however, this project was indefinitely postponed by MassDOT until November 18, 2019, when MassDOT confirmed that, beginning in late summer 2020, the exit renumbering project would start. On May 7, 2021, MassDOT announced that I-495 exit numbers would get renumbered starting on or after May 16, 2021, and it would last for approximately five weeks. The project was broken down into four sections:

- Segment 1: between Route 28 and I-95 (old exits 3–13)
- Segment 2: between I-95 and I-90 (old exits 14–22)
- Segment 3: between I-90 and US 3 (old exits 23–35)
- Segment 4: between US 3 and junction Route 110/I-95 (old exits 37–55)

"OLD EXIT XX" plates will be up for 2 years. However, despite MassDOT saying this, old exit signs are still posted for various exits as of November 2024.

County	Location	mi	km	Exit	Destinations	Notes
Plymouth	Wareham	0.000	0.000	—	Route 25 east – Cape Cod	Continuation east
Plymouth	Wareham	0.000	0.000	1	I-195 west – New Bedford, Providence, RI	Eastern terminus and exit 40B on I-195; trumpet interchange
Plymouth	Wareham	2.487	4.002	2	Route 58 – Carver, Plymouth	Partially in Rochester
Plymouth	Middleborough	7.600	12.231	8	Route 28 – Rock Village, South Middleboro	
Plymouth	Middleborough	12.068	19.422	12	Route 105 – Middleboro Center, Lakeville	To Route 79
Plymouth	Middleborough	14.304	23.020	14	Route 18 / US 44 east – Bridgewater, Plymouth, Lakeville, New Bedford	US 44 not signed southbound
Plymouth	Middleborough	14.722	23.693	15	US 44 – Taunton, Providence, RI, Middleboro, Plymouth	
Bristol–Plymouth county line	Raynham–Bridgewater line	19.081	30.708	19	Route 24 – Boston, Fall River	Signed as exits 19A (Route 24 north) and 19B (Route 24 south); exits 22A and 22B on Route 24
Bristol	Raynham	21.681	34.892	22	Route 138 – Stoughton, Taunton	
Bristol	Taunton	24.508	39.442	25	Bay Street – Taunton, Easton	
Bristol	Norton	26.906	43.301	27	Route 123 to Route 140 south – Norton, Easton	Route 140 not signed southbound
Bristol	Mansfield	29.875	48.079	30	Route 140 south – Norton	No northbound exit; southern end of Route 140 concurrency
Bristol	Mansfield	29.913	48.140	31	Route 140 north – Mansfield	Northern end of Route 140 concurrency. To Route 106
Bristol–Norfolk county line	Mansfield–Foxborough line	32.897	52.943	33	I-95 – Boston, Providence, RI	Signed as exits 33A (I-95 north) and 33B (I-95 south); exits 12A and 12B on I-95
Norfolk	Plainville	35.580	57.260	36	US 1 – Wrentham, North Attleboro	Signed as exits 36A (US 1 north) and 36B (US 1 south); access to Gillette Stadium & Patriot Place (36A) / Plainridge Park Casino and Route 152 (36B)
Norfolk	Wrentham	37.565	60.455	38	Route 1A – Wrentham, Plainville	To Route 121
Norfolk	Franklin	40.954	65.909	41	King Street – Franklin, Woonsocket, RI	
Norfolk	Franklin	43.183	69.496	43	Route 140 – Franklin, Bellingham	
Norfolk	Bellingham	45.820	73.740	46	Route 126 – Medway, Bellingham	
Worcester	Milford	48.318	77.760	48	Route 109 – Milford, Medway	To Route 16
Worcester	Milford	50.245	80.861	50	Route 85 – Milford, Hopkinton	To Route 16
Middlesex	Hopkinton	54.151	87.148	54	West Main Street – Hopkinton, Upton	Signed as exits 54A (Hopkinton east) To Route 135 and 54B (Upton west)
Middlesex–Worcester county line	Hopkinton–Westborough line	57.928	93.226	58	I-90 / Mass Pike – Boston, Springfield, Albany, NY	Exit 106 on I-90 / Mass Pike
Worcester	Westborough	59.443	95.664	59	Route 9 – Framingham, Worcester	Signed as exits 59A (MA 9 east) and 59B (MA 9 west) to Route 30 via West
Worcester–Middlesex county line	Southborough–Marlborough line	61.758	99.390	62	Simarano Drive – Marlboro, Southboro	Interchange constructed in 2000. Briefly signed mistakenly as 62C.
Middlesex	Marlborough	63.155	101.638	63	US 20 – Marlboro, Northboro	Signed as exits 63A (US 20 east) and 63B (US 20 west)
Middlesex	Marlborough	64.895– 64.951	104.438– 104.529	65	I-290 west to Route 85 – Worcester, Hudson, Marlboro	Signed as exits 65A (MA 85) and 65B (I-290); exits 32A and 32B on I-290; access to MA 85 via Route 85 Connector
Worcester	Berlin	67.314	108.331	67	Route 62 – Berlin, Hudson	
Worcester	Bolton	70.006	112.664	70	Route 117 – Bolton, Stow	
Middlesex	Boxborough	74.652	120.141	75	Route 111 – Boxboro, Harvard	
Middlesex	Littleton	77.641	124.951	78	Route 2 – Boston, Leominster	Signed as exits 78A (MA 2 east) and 78B (MA 2 west); exits 113A and 113B on MA 2
Middlesex	Littleton	79.176	127.421	79	Route 2A / Route 110 – Littleton, Ayer	
Middlesex	Littleton	80.209	129.084	80	Route 119 – Littleton, Acton	
Middlesex	Westford	83.297	134.054	83	Boston Road to Route 110 – Westford	To Route 225
Middlesex	Chelmsford	87.328	140.541	87	Route 4 – Chelmsford, North Chelmsford	Northbound exit and southbound entrance
Middlesex	Chelmsford	88.175	141.904	88	Route 110 to Route 4 – Chelmsford, Lowell	Route 4 not signed northbound. To Route 129 and Route 27
Middlesex	Chelmsford	89.143	143.462	89	US 3 – Burlington, Nashua, NH	Signed as exits 89A (US 3 south) and 89B (US 3 north); exits 81A and 81B on US 3
Middlesex	Lowell	89.425	143.916	89C	Lowell Connector north	Exits 1B and 2A on Lowell Connector; To Route 3A
Middlesex	Lowell	91.192	146.759	91	Woburn Street – South Lowell, North Billerica	
Middlesex	Tewksbury	92.284	148.517	92	Route 38 – Lowell, Tewksbury	
Middlesex–Essex county line	Tewksbury–Andover line	94.613	152.265	94	Route 133 – Tewksbury, Andover	Southbound off-ramp begins in Essex County
Essex	Andover	97.023	156.143	97	I-93 – Boston, Salem, NH	Signed as exits 97A (I-93 south) and 97B (I-93 north); exits 40A and 40B on I-93
Essex	Andover	99.411	159.986	99	Route 28 – Lawrence, Andover	Signed as exits 99A (MA 28 south) and 99B (MA 28 north) northbound
Essex	Lawrence	100.149	161.174	100	Route 114 – North Andover, South Lawrence	Signed as exits 100A (MA 114 east) and 100B (MA 114 west)
Essex	North Andover	100.953	162.468	101	Massachusetts Avenue – North Andover	Southbound access from C/D lanes originating at Marston Street exit
Essex	North Andover–Lawrence line	101.370– 101.938	163.139– 164.053	102	Merrimack Street	Access via C/D lanes; NB ramp exits onto SB C/D lanes to Merrimack Street; NB entrance includes direct entrance from Sutton Street
Essex	Lawrence	101.370– 101.938	163.139– 164.053	103A	Commonwealth Drive Marston Street north – Methuen	Northbound signage; accessible to and from C/D lanes Southbound signage; accessible to and from C/D lanes
Essex	Lawrence	101.370– 101.938	163.139– 164.053	103B	Marston Street south – Lawrence	Access to and from C/D lanes
Essex	Methuen	103.121	165.957	104	Route 110 (Merrimack Street) – Pleasant Valley, Methuen	
Essex	Methuen	104.057	167.464	105	Route 213 west (Loop Connector) to I-93 north – Methuen, Salem NH	Eastern terminus and exits 5A and 5B on Route 213
Essex	Haverhill	105.788	170.249	106	To Route 125 – Ward Hill, Bradford	Access via Industrial Avenue
Essex	Haverhill	106.624	171.595	107	Route 110 / Route 113 (River Street)	
Essex	Haverhill	107.303	172.687	108	Route 97 – Haverhill, Salem, NH	
Essex	Haverhill	108.997	175.414	109	Route 125 – Haverhill, Plaistow, NH	Signed as exits 109A (MA 125 south) and 109B (MA 125 north)
Essex	Haverhill	111.182	178.930	111	Route 110 – Haverhill, Merrimac	
Essex	Merrimac	114.894	184.904	115	Broad Street – Merrimac, Merrimacport	
Essex	Amesbury	117.854	189.668	118	Route 150 – Amesbury, Exeter, NH	
Essex	Amesbury	118.880	191.319	119	Route 110 east to I-95 south / US 1 / Route 1A – Salisbury, Boston	Northbound exit and southbound entrance
Essex	Salisbury	120.95	194.65	—	I-95 north to Route 286 – Portsmouth, NH	Northern terminus; exit 89 on I-95
1.000 mi = 1.609 km; 1.000 km = 0.621 mi: Electronic toll collection; Incomplete access
