= Massachusetts Route 114 =

State highway in Essex County, Massachusetts, US

Route 114
- Route 114 highlighted in red

Route information
- Maintained by MassDOT
- Length: 22.42 mi (36.08 km)
- Existed: by 1930–present

Major junctions
- West end: Route 28 in Lawrence
- I-495 in Lawrence; I-95 / US 1 in Danvers; Route 128 in Peabody
- East end: Route 129 in Marblehead

Location
- Country: United States
- State: Massachusetts
- Counties: Essex

Highway system
- Massachusetts State Highway System; Interstate; US; State
| ← Route 113 | → Route 114A |

Route 114 is a 22.42-mile-long (36.08 km) Massachusetts state route that, while essentially a northwest–southeast route, is signed west–east. It runs from Route 28 in Lawrence to its terminus at Route 129 in Marblehead. The route is entirely located in Essex County.

Route 114 is not related to Route 114A in Seekonk, which is actually related to Rhode Island Route 114 and is located about 50 miles (80 km) away from Massachusetts Route 114.

== Route description ==
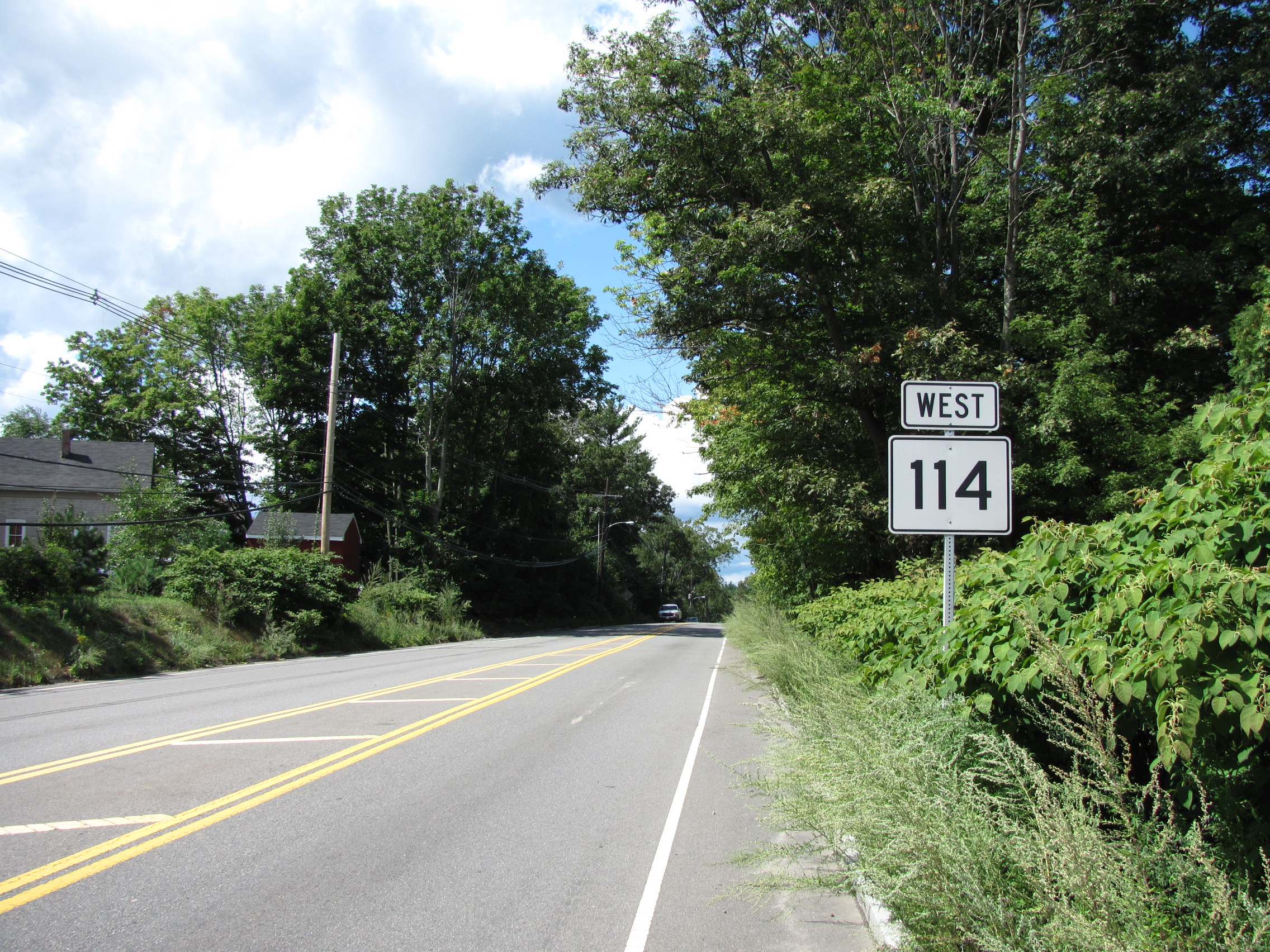
Route 114 westbound in Middleton

Route 114 begins in Lawrence at Route 28, at the southern end of the O'Leary Bridge. It heads eastward along Merrimack Street before turning southward onto Parker Street, passing Lawrence Station as it does. It then bends southeastward at Andover Street, intersecting I-495 at Exit 100 (formerly 42). It then crosses the Shawsheen River into North Andover, becoming the Salem Turnpike and serving as the main retail corridor in the town. In North Andover, Route 114 passes through the town’s southern sections, closely paralleling the Andover town line, which passes within 300 feet of the highway at one point, with the parking lots of some businesses along the highway straddling both towns. It crosses Route 133 before beginning a concurrency with Route 125 which lasts for over half a mile, passing through the Merrimack College campus in the process. Near Merrimack’s East Campus and the athletic complex, Route 125 splits from 114 as a super-two bypass that provides access to Interstate 93, while Route 114 continues southeastward into Middleton, where it has a short wrong-way concurrency with Route 62 in the center of town.

From Middleton, Route 114 heads into Danvers. In Danvers, Route 114 has interchanges with U.S. Route 1 and I-95 in quick succession before entering into Peabody. In Peabody, Route 114 passes the Northshore Mall just before meeting Route 128 at Exit 40 (formerly 25). It continues through the northeastern part of town, meeting the southern end of Route 35 before passing into Salem.

In Salem, Route 114 crosses over Route 107 adjacent to the Salem Station. It then continues along North Street, which turns into Summer Street before the route turns eastward onto Norman Street. It then turns south onto Lafayette Street, becoming concurrent with Route 1A southward, until the two split in front of Salem State University, with Route 114 continuing southward, crossing the Forest River into Marblehead. The route finally ends at the intersection of Pleasant Street and Ocean Avenue, where it meets the eastern end of Route 129, at Marblehead's main fire station.

== History ==
Route 114 was originally the Essex Turnpike.

For about its first three decades as 114, Route 114 originally went only as far as Salem. The route was extended to Marblehead in the late 1950s.

Between 1997 and 2002, the terminations of Routes 114 and 129 in Marblehead were extended by slightly more than half a mile eastward, to meet at Essex and Pleasant Streets. After 2002, the roads reverted to their prior forms.

== Major intersections ==
The entire route is in Essex County.

| Location | mi | km | Destinations | Notes |
|---|---|---|---|---|
| Lawrence | 0.00 | 0.00 | Route 28 | Western terminus |
| Lawrence | 1.7 | 2.7 | I-495 – Lowell, Marlboro, Haverhill, Salisbury | Exit 100 on I-495; partial cloverleaf interchange |
| North Andover | 2.8 | 4.5 | Route 133 – Shawsheen, Lowell, Georgetown | |
| North Andover | 2.9 | 4.7 | Route 125 north – Haverhill, Plaistow, NH | Western end of Route 125 concurrency |
| North Andover | 3.5 | 5.6 | Route 125 south to I-93 – Wilmington | Eastern end of Route 125 concurrency |
| Middleton | 10.7 | 17.2 | Route 62 east – Danvers, Beverly | Western end of Route 62 concurrency |
| Middleton | 10.9 | 17.5 | Route 62 west – North Reading, Burlington | Eastern end of Route 62 concurrency |
| Danvers | 13.8 | 22.2 | US 1 – Peabody, Newburyport | Cloverleaf interchange |
| Danvers | 13.9 | 22.4 | I-95 to Route 128 – Waltham, Boston, Salisbury, Portsmouth, NH | Exits 67A-B on I-95; partial cloverleaf interchange; no eastbound access to I-95 north |
| Peabody | 16.3 | 26.2 | Route 128 to I-95 / US 1 – Boston, Beverly, Gloucester | Exits 40A-B on Route 128; cloverleaf interchange |
| Peabody | 17.5 | 28.2 | Route 35 north – Danvers | Southern terminus of Route 35 |
| Salem | 18.9 | 30.4 | Route 107 – Beverly, Lynn | Ramp access between the two routes |
| Salem | 19.4 | 31.2 | Route 1A north – Beverly | Western end of Route 1A concurrency |
| Salem | 20.4 | 32.8 | Route 1A south – Swampscott, Lynn | Eastern end of Route 1A concurrency |
| Marblehead | 22.42 | 36.08 | Route 129 west – Lynn, Boston | Eastern terminus; eastern terminus of Route 129 |
1.000 mi = 1.609 km; 1.000 km = 0.621 mi: Concurrency terminus; Incomplete access
