= Veterans Memorial Bridge (Essex County, Massachusetts) =

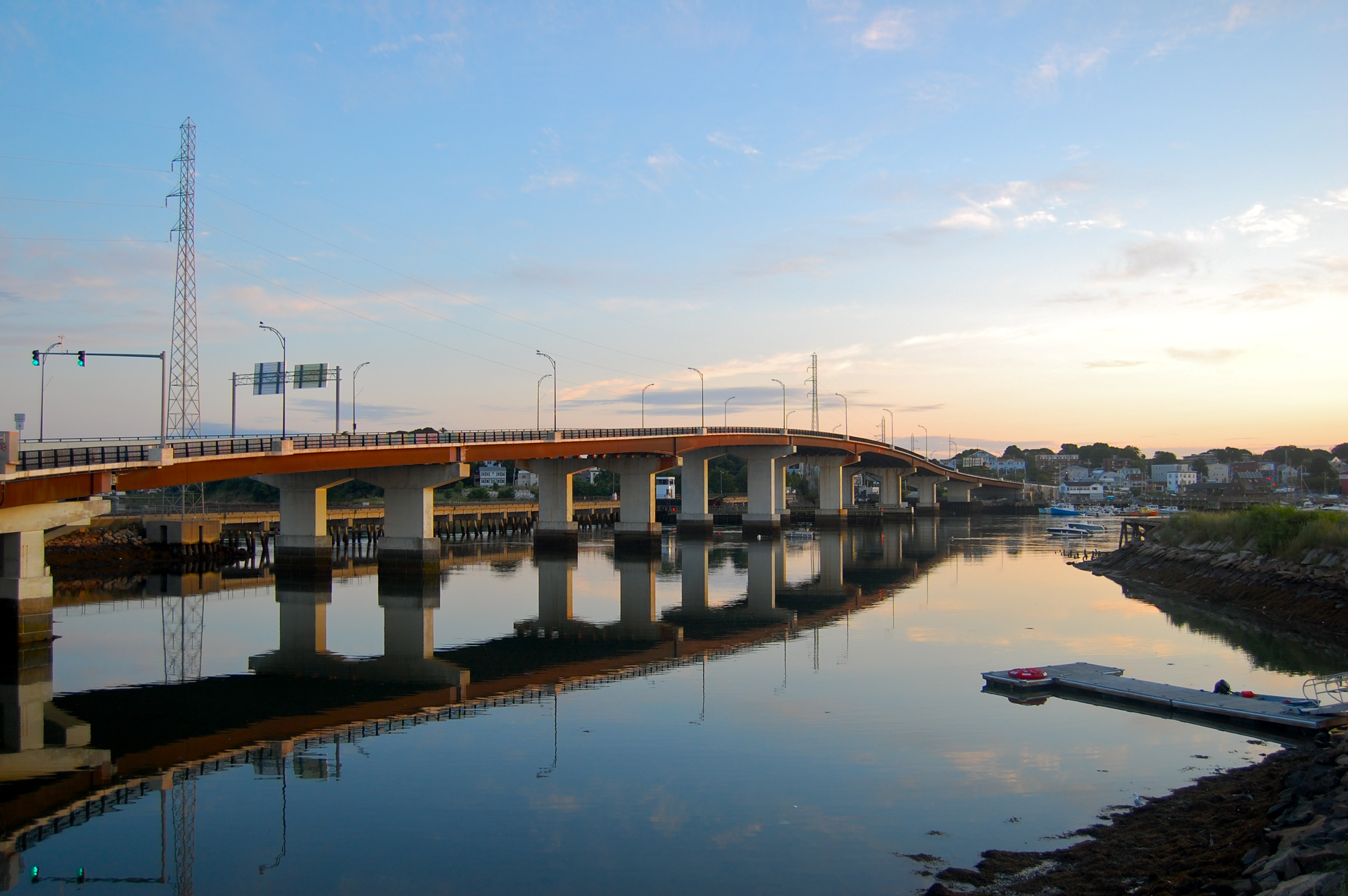
- Veterans Memorial Bridge
- Coordinates: 42.5388°N 70.8876°W
- Carries: Route 1A and pedestrian traffic
- Crosses: Danvers River
- Locale: Salem, Massachusetts and Beverly, Massachusetts
- Official name: Veterans Memorial Bridge

History
- Opened: 1997

Veterans Memorial Bridge, also called the Beverly-Salem Bridge, is a fixed-span roadway bridge crossing the Danvers River carrying Massachusetts Route 1A between Salem and Beverly, Massachusetts. It opened in 1996, replacing the historic Essex Bridge at the same location.

== History ==
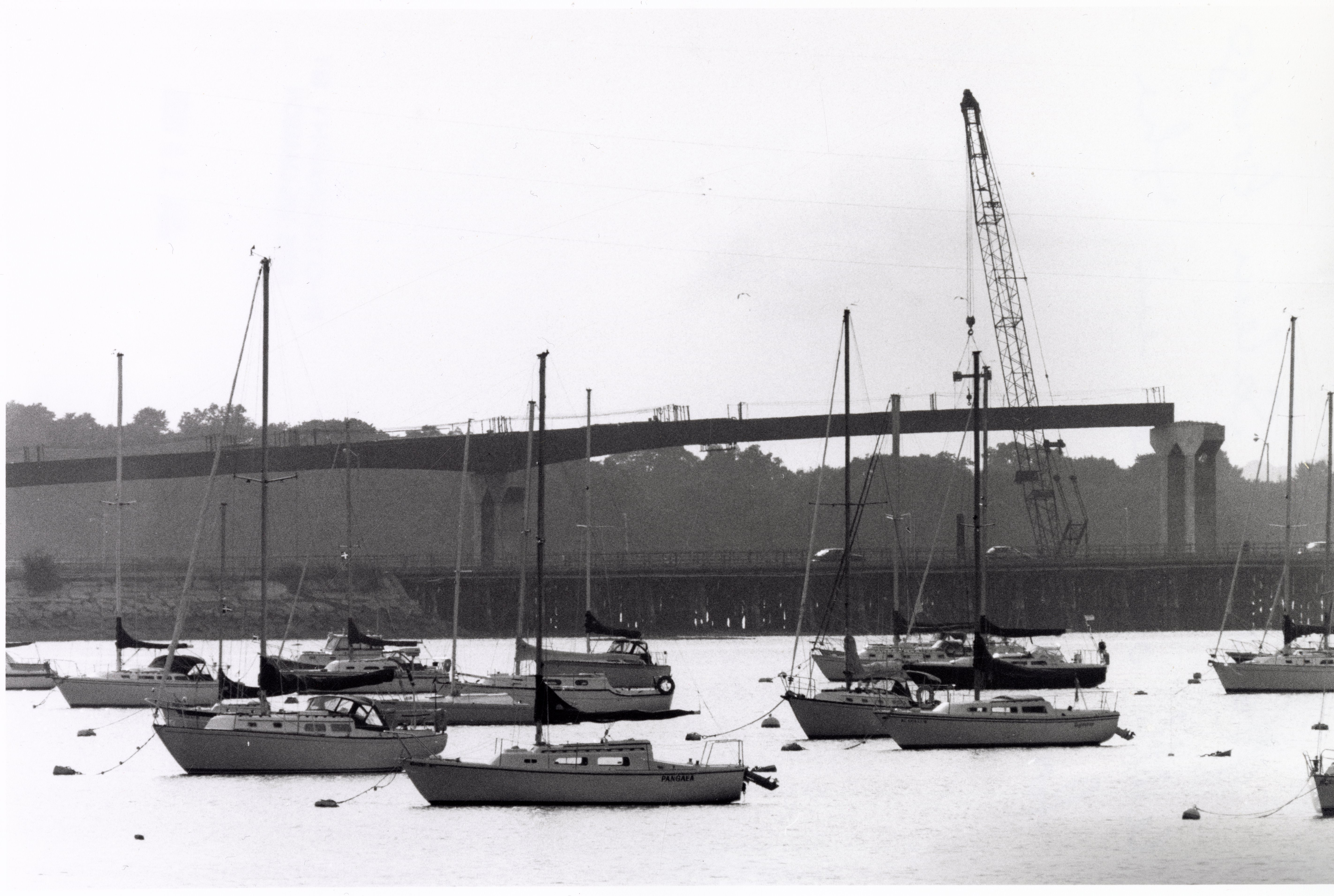
The bridge under construction in 1995

The Veterans Memorial Bridge is located at the site of the historic Essex Bridge. Originally, a ferry crossed the Danvers River at the location from 1636 until 1788 when the first bridge was built. This bridge was rebuilt several times until 1896 when a steel pony truss swing bridge with trestle approaches was constructed by the county. It was constructed by the King Bridge Company of Cleveland, Ohio. Part of the cost of the 1896 bridge was covered by the Bay State Street Railway, which operated on a track over the bridge until 1934. The trolley tracks were later removed.

By the early 1990s the steel bridge had deteriorated to a point where it had to be demolished. It was replaced by the current span in 1996, and "dedicated on August 2nd, 1996 in honor Salem veterans who served the United States in its time of need".

The Veterans Memorial Bridge contains seven main spans with the longest measuring 220 feet. It also contains four approach spans ranging between 60 and 160 feet in length. The current bridge is typical of MassDOT's preference for use of weathering steel for steel bridges.
