= Massachusetts Route 129 =

Highway in Massachusetts

Route 129
- Route 129 highlighted in red

Route information
- Maintained by MassDOT
- Length: 34.08 mi (54.85 km)
- Existed: 1920s–present

Major junctions
- West end: Route 4 / Route 110 / Route 27 in Chelmsford
- US 3 in Chelmsford; I-93 in Wilmington; I-95 / Route 128 in Wakefield; US 1 from Saugus to Lynnfield
- East end: Route 114 in Marblehead

Location
- Country: United States
- State: Massachusetts
- Counties: Middlesex, Essex

Highway system
- Massachusetts State Highway System; Interstate; US; State
← Route 128A	→ Route 130

Route 129 is a 34.08-mile-long (54.85 km) east–west Massachusetts state route that runs from Route 4 and Route 110 in Chelmsford to Route 114 in Marblehead. Along the way it intersects several major highways including U.S. Route 3 (US 3) in Chelmsford, Interstate 93 (I-93) in Wilmington, I-95 in Wakefield, and US 1 in Saugus and Lynnfield.

== Route description ==
Route 129 begins at Route 110 in Chelmsford Center, where the northbound lanes of Route 4 leave Route 110. The route passes out of the town center to the east before intersecting U.S. Route 3 at Exit 79. It passes into Billerica, and shortly thereafter has a concurrency with Route 3A for just over a mile, following southbound on that route and crossing the Concord River. The route then turns eastward once more, heading over the Shawsheen River into Wilmington. In Wilmington, Route 129 becomes concurrent with Route 38, crossing Route 62 and passing the Wilmington MBTA station in the process. The two routes split south of the intersection, with Route 129 heading more southeasterly towards its intersection with Interstate 93 at Exit 31.

After crossing I-93, Route 129 heads into Reading. The route crosses Route 28 just north of the town center before continuing eastward. At the town line with Wakefield, the route enters a rotary intersection with I-95 and Route 128 at Exit 58, most of which is in the town of Wakefield. Shortly after leaving the rotary, and just after crossing the Saugus River, Route 129 turns southward along Main Street, following the eastern side of Lake Quannapowitt towards the town center. At Water Street, Route 129 turns eastward, passing the Center Depot, which is on the National Register of Historic Places and along the Haverhill Line (though currently without a stop). From Wakefield, Route 129 enters Saugus and Essex County. Passing the Breakheart Reservation, the route joins U.S. Route 1 at a cloverleaf intersection, following the route concurrently northward into Lynnfield.

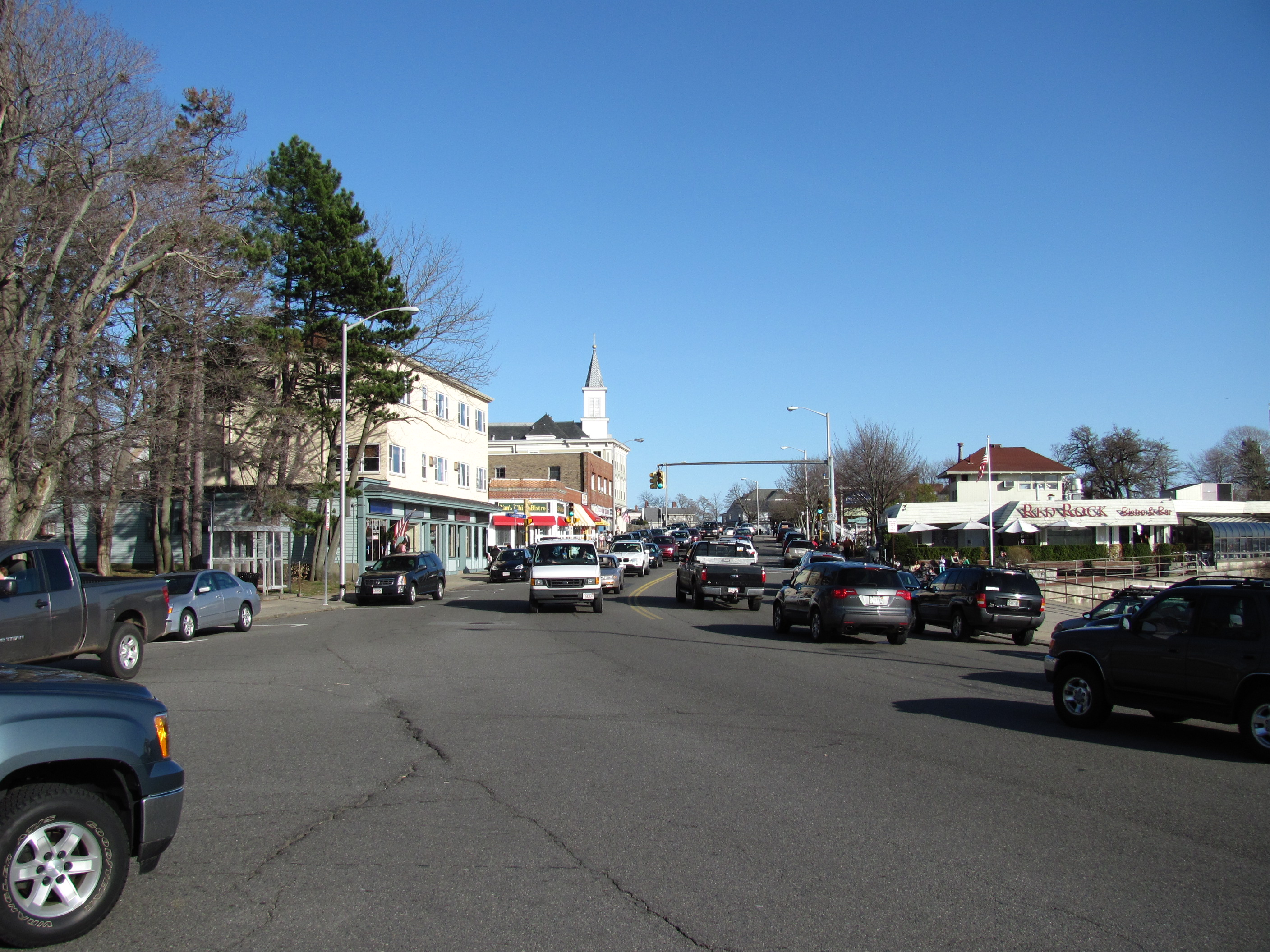
Route 129 eastbound in Swampscott

In Lynnfield, Route 129 leaves Route 1 at the Lynnfield Tunnel, a traffic landmark just south of I-95 and Route 128. Just east of this point, Route 129 enters Goodwin Circle, which provides access to all three highways via a connector road. Immediately after leaving the circle, Route 129 enters the city of Lynn. In Lynn the route heads southeastward, above the Lynn Woods Reservation, twisting around Sluice Pond before meeting Route 129A next to Flax Pond. At this intersection, Route 129 turns southwest along Boston Street before turning southeast on Washington Street, where it crosses Route 107. After passing east of Lynn Common, the route splits, with the eastbound side staying on Washington Street and the westbound following Central Avenue and Exchange Street. Both directions meet again on Route 1A, staying concurrent with that route until meeting the eastern end of Route 129A, turning south before turning eastward once more and entering Swampscott.

In Swampscott, Route 129 follows along King's Beach, above Black Will's Cliff and then along Fisherman's Beach before turning more inland, bypassing the Phillips Point neighborhood before coming close to the ocean once again in the Beach Bluff neighborhood as it enters Marblehead. Once in Marblehead, Route 129 continues along Atlantic Avenue before finally terminating at the corner of Atlantic and Ocean, where it meets the eastern end of Route 114. Atlantic Avenue continues into downtown Marblehead from this point, while Ocean Avenue heads across a short isthmus onto Marblehead Neck.

== History ==
Route 129 (which was likely formed sometime in the 1920s) was originally a shorter route that only existed between Wilmington and Lynn, expanding to Marblehead by 1933 and to Chelmsford in 1939.

Prior to the construction of the Yankee Division Highway, Route 128 shared a short concurrency with Route 129 in Wakefield, joining the route at the intersection of Water Street and Main Street and leaving at the junction of Vernon Street and Water Street.

In 1996, Route 129 had a realignment in Lynn, with the old route re-designated as Route 129A. This was done to bring the route through downtown.

== Major intersections ==
County	Location	mi	km	Destinations	Notes
Middlesex	Chelmsford	0.00	0.00	Route 4 / Route 110 to I-495 / Route 27 – Lowell, Lawrence, Bedford, North Chelmsford, Littleton	Western terminus
Middlesex	Chelmsford	2.3	3.7	US 3 – Burlington, Lowell, Nashua, NH	Exit 79 on US 3; partial cloverleaf interchange
Middlesex	Billerica	3.5	5.6	Route 3A north	Western end of Route 3A concurrency
Middlesex	Billerica	4.7	7.6	Route 3A south – Billerica	Eastern end of Route 3A concurrency
Middlesex	Wilmington	10.2	16.4	Route 38 north – Tewksbury	Western end of Route 38 concurrency
Middlesex	Wilmington	11.1	17.9	Route 62 – Burlington, Bedford, North Reading	
Middlesex	Wilmington	11.5	18.5	Route 38 south – Woburn	Eastern end of Route 38 concurrency
Middlesex	Wilmington	13.2	21.2	I-93 – Boston, Lawrence, Concord NH	Exit 31 on I-93; partial cloverleaf interchange
Middlesex	Reading	15.1	24.3	Route 28	
Middlesex	Wakefield	16.2	26.1	I-95 / Route 128 – Waltham, Peabody	Exit 58 on I-95; roundabout interchange
Essex	Saugus	21.3	34.3	US 1 south – Revere, Boston	Western end of US 1 concurrency
Essex	Lynnfield	23.3	37.5	US 1 north – Danvers	Eastern end of US 1 concurrency
Essex	Lynnfield	23.9	38.5	To I-95 / Route 128 / US 1 – Portsmouth, NH, Waltham	Goodwin Circle
Essex	Lynn	27.0	43.5	Route 129A east – Swampscott, Salem	Western terminus of Route 129A
Essex	Lynn	27.9	44.9	Route 107	
Essex	Lynn	28.7	46.2	Route 1A south to Route 16 / Route 60 – Revere	Western end of Route 1A concurrency
Essex	Lynn	29.9	48.1	Route 1A north / Route 129A west – Salem	Eastern end of Route 1A concurrency; eastern terminus of Route 129A
Essex	Marblehead	34.08	54.85	Route 114 west to Route 1A – Salem	Eastern terminus; eastern terminus of Route 114
1.000 mi = 1.609 km; 1.000 km = 0.621 mi: Concurrency terminus

== Suffixed routes ==
Route 129A
- Location: Lynn
- Length: 2.48 mi (3.99 km)
- Existed: 1996–present

Route 129A is an east–west Massachusetts state route that serves as an alternate to Route 129, located entirely in Lynn, Massachusetts. The route was created in 1996, taking over the old routing of Route 129 in Lynn after it was realigned to enter downtown.

The route starts where Route 129 leaves its old routing when it enters Lynn, heading southeast. It soon enters into a concurrency with Route 107 and goes northeast, but returns to going southeast when the concurrency ends. Route 129A ends at the end of a concurrency between Routes 1A and 129, when 129 returns to its older route.
