= Rowley (CDP), Massachusetts =

Rowley, Massachusetts
- Census-designated place
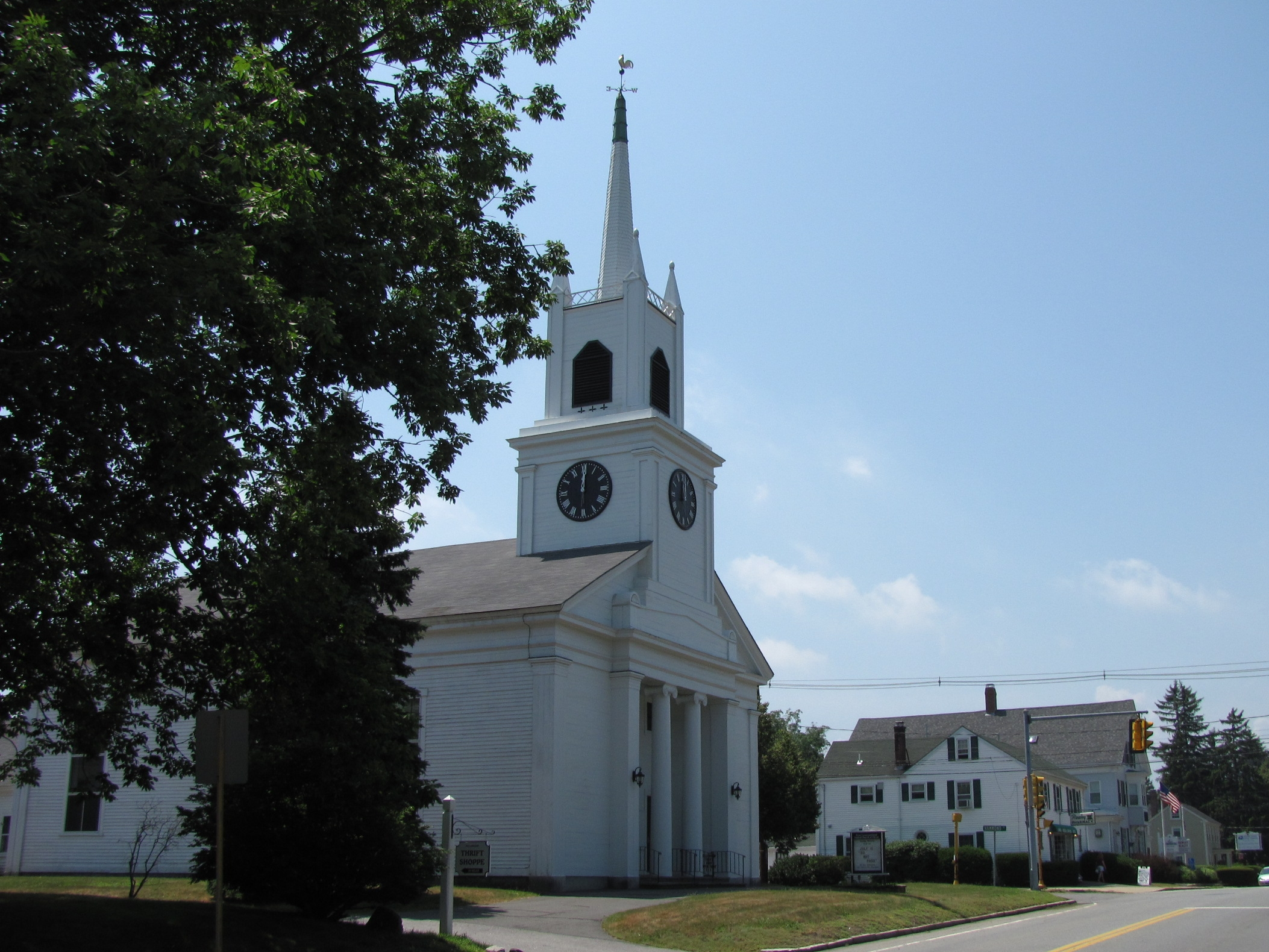
- First Congregational Church

- Location in Essex County and the state of Massachusetts.
- Coordinates: 42°43′7″N 70°52′38″W
- Country: United States
- State: Massachusetts
- County: Essex
- Town: Rowley

Area
  - Total: 1.74 sq mi (4.51 km^{2})
  - Land: 1.71 sq mi (4.44 km^{2})
  - Water: 0.027 sq mi (0.07 km^{2})
- Elevation: 46 ft (14 m)

Population (2020)
  - Total: 1,523
  - Density: 888.4/sq mi (343.03/km^{2})
- Time zone: UTC-5 (Eastern (EST))
  - Summer (DST): UTC-4 (EDT)
- ZIP code: 01969
- Area code: 978
- FIPS code: 25-58370
- GNIS feature ID: 0614336

Rowley is a census-designated place (CDP) in the town of Rowley in Essex County, Massachusetts, United States. The population was 1,416 at the 2010 census.

== Geography ==
Rowley is located at 42°43′07″N 70°52′38″W (42.718692, -70.877164).

According to the United States Census Bureau, the CDP has a total area of 1.74 square miles (4.51 km^{2}), of which 1.71 square miles (4.44 km^{2}) is land and 0.03 square miles (0.07 km^{2}), or 1.53%, is water.

== Demographics ==
Historical population
Census	Pop.	Note	%±
2020	1,523		—
U.S. Decennial Census

As of the census of 2000, there were 1,434 people, 569 households, and 386 families residing in the CDP. The population density was 316.4 people/km^{2} (819 people/mi^{2}). There were 584 housing units at an average density of 128.8 units/km^{2} (334 units/mi^{2}). The racial makeup of the CDP was 98.33% White, 0.35% Black or African American, 0.49% Native American, 0.56% Asian, and 0.28% from two or more races. Hispanic or Latino of any race were 0.49% of the population.

There were 569 households, out of which 29.2% had children under the age of 18 living with them, 57.5% were married couples living together, 7.4% had a female householder with no husband present, and 32.0% were non-families. 27.1% of all households were made up of individuals, and 13.5% had someone living alone who was 65 years of age or older. The average household size was 2.52 and the average family size was 3.09.

In the CDP, the population was spread out, with 23.9% under the age of 18, 6.1% from 18 to 24, 28.4% from 25 to 44, 27.1% from 45 to 64, and 14.4% who were 65 years of age or older. The median age was 41 years. For every 100 females, there were 89.9 males. For every 100 females age 18 and over, there were 89.7 males.

The median income for a household in the CDP was $47,031, and the median income for a family was $58,500. Males had a median income of $42,470 versus $28,487 for females. The per capita income for the CDP was $21,343. About 2.2% of families and 4.4% of the population were below the poverty line, including none of those under age 18 and 19.0% of those age 65 or over.
