= Sharon (CDP), Massachusetts =

Sharon, Massachusetts
- Census-designated place
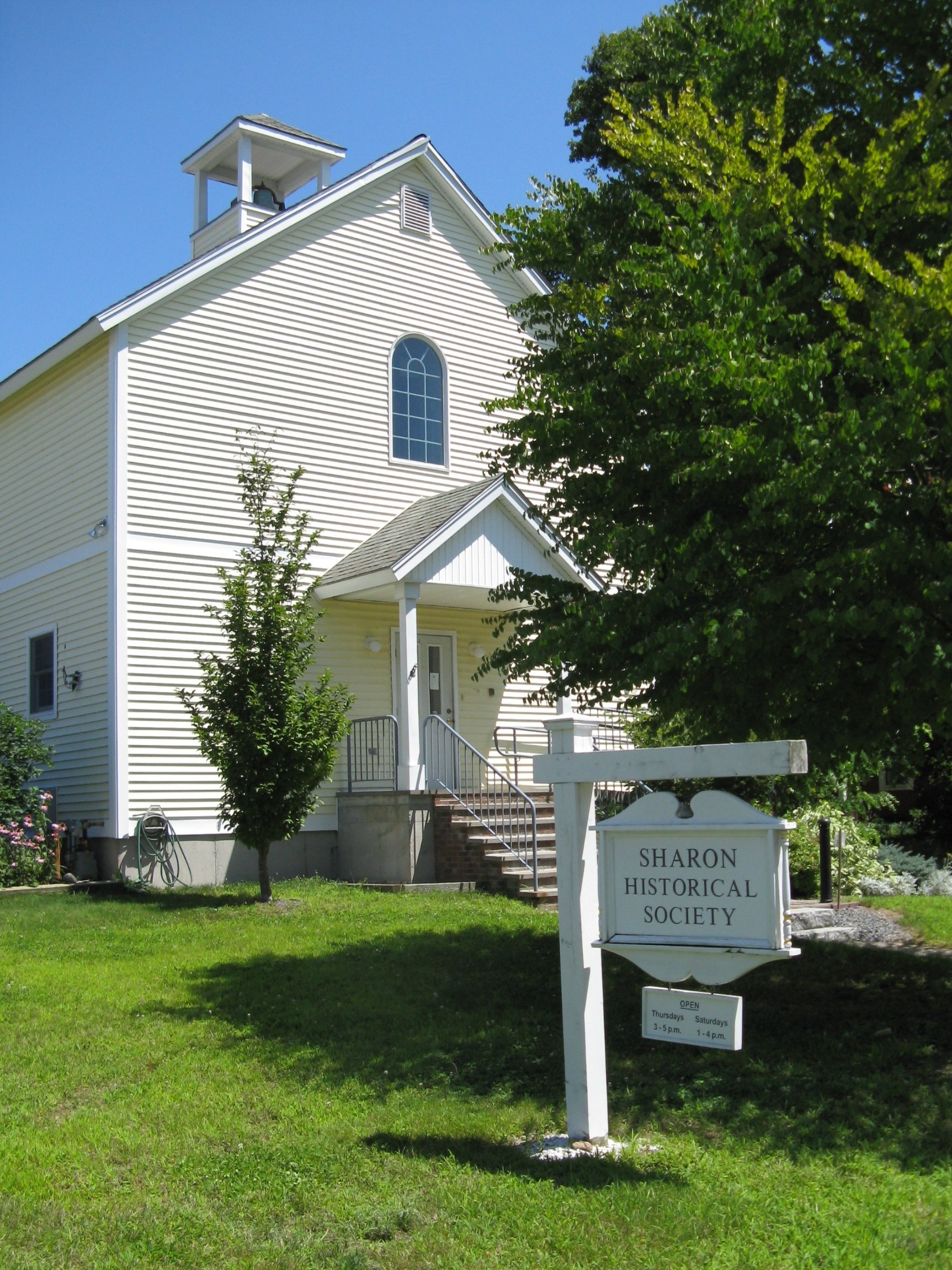
- Historical Society

- Location in Norfolk County in Massachusetts
- Coordinates: 42°6′55″N 71°11′0″W
- Country: United States
- State: Massachusetts
- County: Norfolk
- Town: Sharon

Area
  - Total: 3.03 sq mi (7.85 km^{2})
  - Land: 2.99 sq mi (7.75 km^{2})
  - Water: 0.039 sq mi (0.10 km^{2})
- Elevation: 300 ft (90 m)

Population (2020)
  - Total: 6,184
  - Density: 2,066.8/sq mi (797.99/km^{2})
- Time zone: UTC-5 (Eastern (EST))
  - Summer (DST): UTC-4 (EDT)
- ZIP code: 02067
- Area code: 781
- FIPS code: 25-60820
- GNIS feature ID: 0612529

Sharon is a census-designated place (CDP) in the town of Sharon in Norfolk County, Massachusetts, United States. The population was 6,184 at the 2020 census.

== Geography ==
Sharon is located at 42°6′55″N 71°10′59″W (42.115301, -71.18324).

According to the United States Census Bureau, the CDP has a total area of 7.8 km^{2} (3.0 mi^{2}), of which 7.7 km^{2} (3.0 mi^{2}) is land and 0.1 km^{2} (0.04 mi^{2}) (0.99%) is water.

== Demographics ==
Historical population
Census	Pop.	Note	%±
2020	6,184		—
U.S. Decennial Census

According to the 2000 census, there were 5,941 people, 2,052 households, and 1,678 families in the CDP. The population density was 767.2/km^{2} (1,987.3/mi^{2}). There were 2,084 housing units at an average density of 269.1/km^{2} (697.1/mi^{2}). The racial makeup of the CDP was 92.41% White, 2.46% Black or African American, 0.24% Native American, 3.10% Asian, 0.02% Pacific Islander, 0.49% from other races, and 1.30% from two or more races. Hispanic or Latino of any race were 1.13%.

Of the 2,052 households 44.2% had children under the age of 18 living with them, 70.8% were married couples living together, 8.4% had a female householder with no husband present, and 18.2% were non-families. 15.6% of households were one person and 7.3% were one person aged 65 or older. The average household size was 2.89 and the average family size was 3.25.

The age distribution was 30.8% under the age of 18, 3.8% from 18 to 24, 27.3% from 25 to 44, 26.6% from 45 to 64, and 11.5% 65 or older. The median age was 39 years. For every 100 females, there were 95.9 males. For every 100 females age 18 and over, there were 92.6 males.

The median household income was $74,648 and the median family income was $84,747. Males had a median income of $66,289 versus $45,800 for females. The per capita income for the CDP was $34,453. About 2.5% of families and 2.9% of the population were below the poverty line, including 4.0% of those under age 18 and 4.7% of those age 65 or over.
