= North Shore (Massachusetts) =

Region of Massachusetts, United States

- Region of Massachusetts
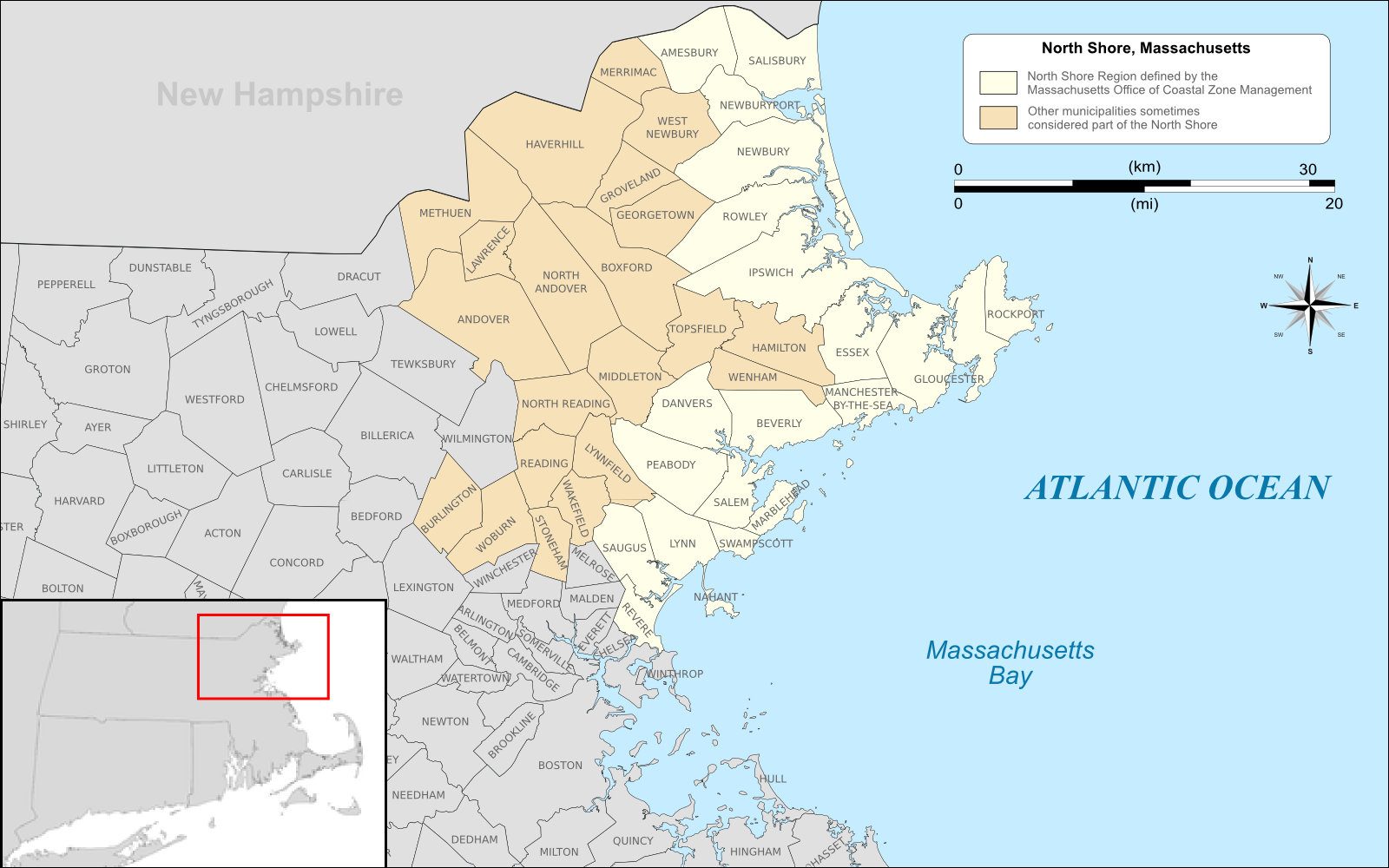
- The North Shore region of Massachusetts
- Interactive map of North Shore
- Coordinates: 42.6°N 70.8°W
- Country: United States
- State: Massachusetts
- Metropolitan area: Greater Boston
- Subregions: Merrimack Valley; Cape Ann

Population (2010)
  - Total: 636,187
- Largest municipality (population): Lynn (94,654)
- Largest municipality (land): Ipswich (42.51 sq mi (110.1 km^{2}))

The North Shore is a region of Massachusetts, United States. It is loosely defined as the Atlantic Ocean coast between Boston and New Hampshire. Its counterpart is the South Shore region extending south and east of Boston.

The North Shore is a significant historical, cultural, and economic region of Massachusetts. The southern North Shore includes historic towns that are now part of the Boston metropolis. The Salem witch trials took place here. At the northern end, the Merrimack Valley was an important center of the Industrial Revolution in the United States. The North Shore includes a number of places that are significant in the literary and cultural history of the United States.

The North Shore landscape includes seaports, fishing villages, and rocky coastline dotted with marshes and wetlands, as well as beaches and natural harbors. Cape Ann is the largest promontory.

== Definition ==
The North Shore has no fixed definition as a region. It may include only those communities between Boston and Cape Ann, as defined by the Metropolitan Area Planning Council (whose purview does not go beyond Greater Boston); or the larger part of Essex County, including parts of the Merrimack Valley, as defined by the North Shore Chamber of Commerce. The Massachusetts Office of Coastal Zone Management, which defines regions in terms of watershed, refers to the North Shore as the coastal region of Massachusetts north of Boston stretching from Salisbury to Revere, including the inland city of Amesbury.

=== Coastal ===
North Shore of Massachusetts could be taken to mean the entire coast of Massachusetts from New Hampshire to Boston (listed in order, north-to-south):

- Salisbury
- Newburyport
- Newbury
- Rowley
- Ipswich
- Essex
- Rockport
- Gloucester
- Manchester-by-the-Sea
- Beverly
- Danvers
- Peabody
- Salem
- Marblehead
- Swampscott
- Nahant
- Lynn
- Saugus
- Revere
- Winthrop

=== Economic ===
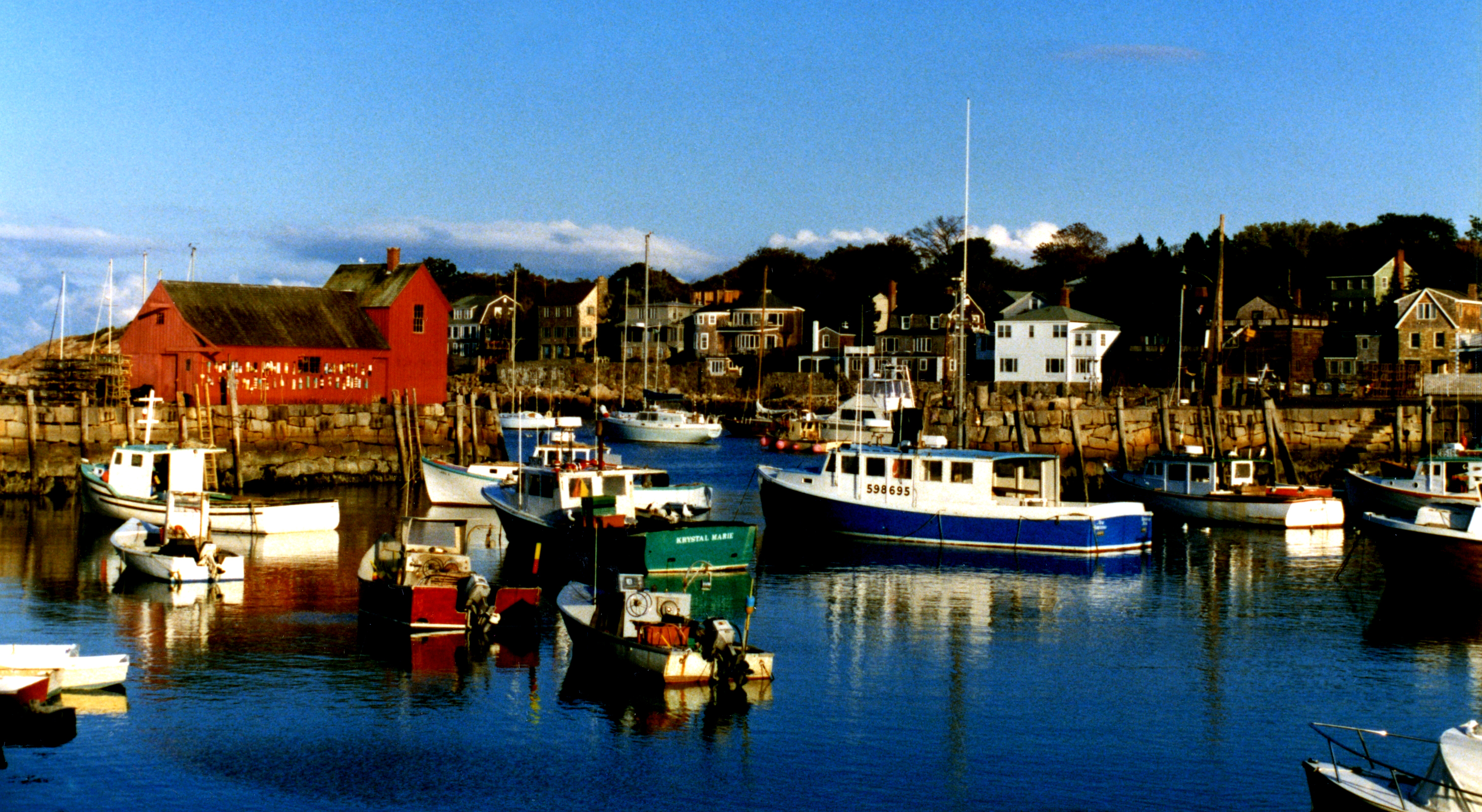
Fishing boats in the harbor of Rockport, Massachusetts

The Boston Metropolitan Area Planning Council's North Shore Task Force, a regional planning agency, defines the North Shore as also encompassing Cape Ann and several inland communities. When combined with the North Shore Chamber of Commerce's definition of the region, the North Shore comprises the following cities and towns:

- Amesbury
- Beverly
- Boxford
- Danvers
- Essex
- Georgetown
- Gloucester
- Groveland
- Hamilton
- Haverhill
- Ipswich
- Lynn
- Lynnfield
- Manchester-by-the-Sea
- Marblehead
- Merrimac
- Middleton
- Nahant
- Newbury
- Newburyport
- Peabody
- Rockport
- Rowley
- Salem
- Salisbury
- Saugus
- Swampscott
- Topsfield
- Wakefield
- Wenham
- West Newbury

=== Cultural ===
The North Shore has historically been viewed as a wealthy, exclusive collection of towns and fishing villages, but also contains some working-class cities and suburbs of Boston. In 1893, The New York Times described the region as a notable summer destination for the socialites, politicians, and businessmen of New York and New England, dotted with hotels, cottages, and burgeoning gentlemen's clubs. Salem, known worldwide as the location of the Salem witch trials; the working-class fishing city of Gloucester; and the region's many beaches make it a popular tourist destination.

== History ==
The North Shore communities have varied and rich histories: Gloucester was America's first fishing community; Salem was the location of the infamous witch trials as well as one of the largest centers of shipping and sixth largest city in early America. The hysteria that led to the witch trials began in the part of Salem that is now Danvers. Lynn was once the center of the American shoe industry. Saugus is home to the first integrated ironworks in North America. Peabody had the largest concentration of tanneries in the world; and Beverly and Marblehead often dispute over which town was the birthplace of the American Navy. Newburyport was well known for producing clipper ships and for a brief time in history was the richest city in the Union; it is also the birthplace of the United States Coast Guard. Newburyport maintains the largest collection of Federal period commercial and residential architecture in the nation.

== Sites of interest ==
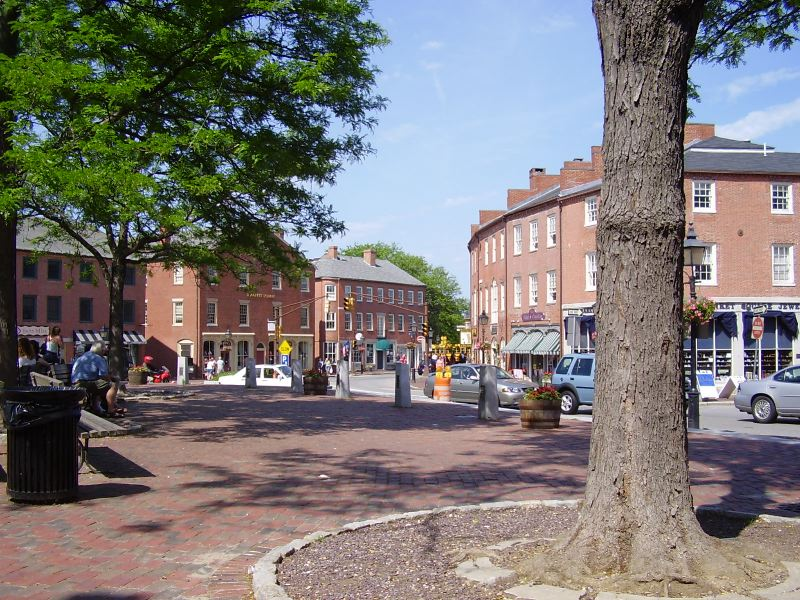
Market Square in downtown Newburyport, Massachusetts

- The Peabody Essex Museum: A museum with large collections of maritime artifacts and Asian art.
- National Register of Historic Places listings in Salem, Massachusetts
- The Salem Witch Museum
- Historic Downtown Salem
- The Salem Seaport
- The Saugus Iron Works
- The Swampscott Fish House: The oldest active fish house in the country.
- Newburyport's historic district maintains the nation's largest collection of Federal period architecture
- Historic Gloucester and Rockport Seaports
- North Shore Navigators collegiate-league baseball team
- The North Shore Music Theatre in Beverly, New England's largest regional theater
- The Larcom Theatre in Beverly built in 1912 is the oldest, operating Vaudeville theatre in the region, also once home to Le Grand David.
- The Cabot Street Cinema Theatre in Beverly was home to Le Grand David, the world's longest-running resident stage magic show, until 2013.
- Castle Hill in Ipswich
- Revere Beach, the first public beach in the United States, in Revere
- The Rebecca Nurse Homestead in Danvers, the only home of a victim of the Salem witch trials open to the public

== See also ==
- Greater Boston
- Merrimack Valley
- South Shore (Massachusetts)
