= Beverly Center Business District =

Historic district in Massachusetts, United States

- U.S. National Register of Historic Places
- U.S. Historic district
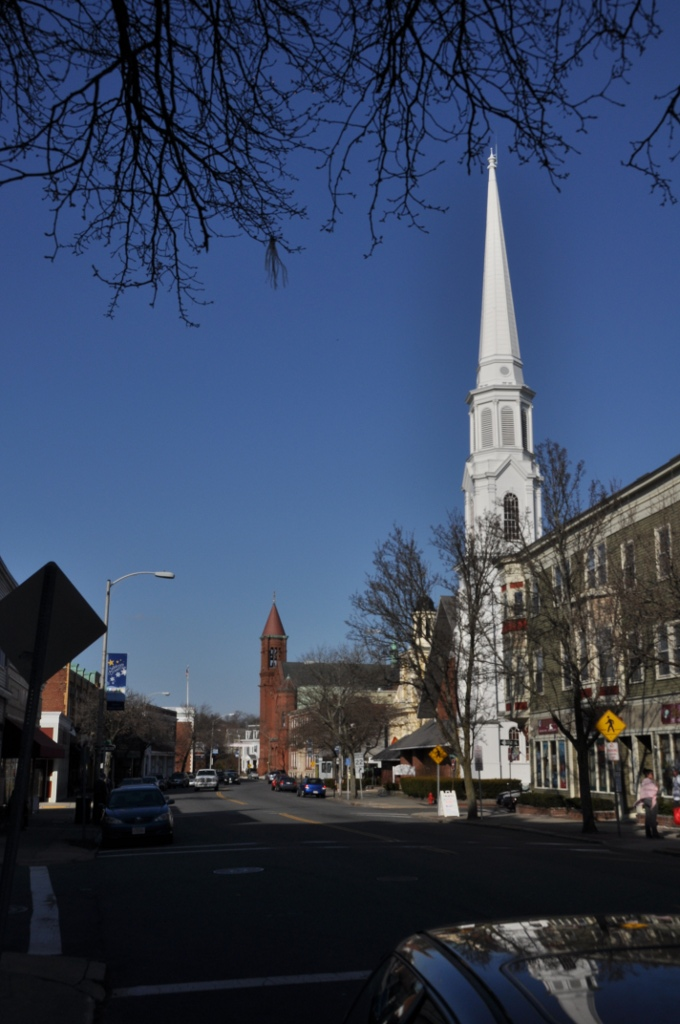
- Cabot Street in Beverly Center

- Location within Massachusetts Location within the United States
- Location: Beverly, Massachusetts
- Coordinates: 42°32′54″N 70°52′41″W
- Area: 46 acres (19 ha)
- Built: 1764
- Architectural style: Greek Revival, Late Victorian
- NRHP reference No.: 84002313
- Added to NRHP: July 5, 1984

The Beverly Center Business District encompasses much of the historic 19th century commercial heart of Beverly, Massachusetts. Centered on Cabot and Church Streets between Central Street and the Beverly Common, its architecture reflects the city's growth over 150 years. The district was added to the National Register of Historic Places in 1984.

== Description and history ==
The city of Beverly is located on the North Shore of Massachusetts, just northeast of Salem, from which it is separated by the Danvers River. The city at first grew up around its waterfront on the river, but its present commercial business center took shape in the 19th century, with the arrival of the railroad (in 1839), and the subsequent development of a major shoe industry. Its downtown area is mostly reflective of late 19th and early 20th century commercial development, although significant reminders of its maritime past survive as well.

The historic district is centered on a stretch of Cabot Street, extending north from Central Street to a central junction with Federal and Church Streets. It then runs along Church Street to Dane Street, where Beverly Common extends along Dane Street all the way to Hale. The district includes properties on some adjacent side streets. There are more than 100 historically significant buildings, including the city's major municipal buildings and churches, as well as a significant amount of commercial property. Prominent buildings include Beverly City Hall, the 1781 Federal style mansion of one of the city's early important merchants, Andrew Cabot, and the John Cabot House, built by Andrew's brother, which now serves as the headquarters of the Beverly Historical Society. The Odd Fellows' Hall, located opposite city hall, is a high-style Late Gothic commercial block.

== See also ==
- National Register of Historic Places listings in Essex County, Massachusetts
