= Odd Fellows' Hall (Beverly, Massachusetts) =

- U.S. National Register of Historic Places
- U.S. Historic district – Contributing property
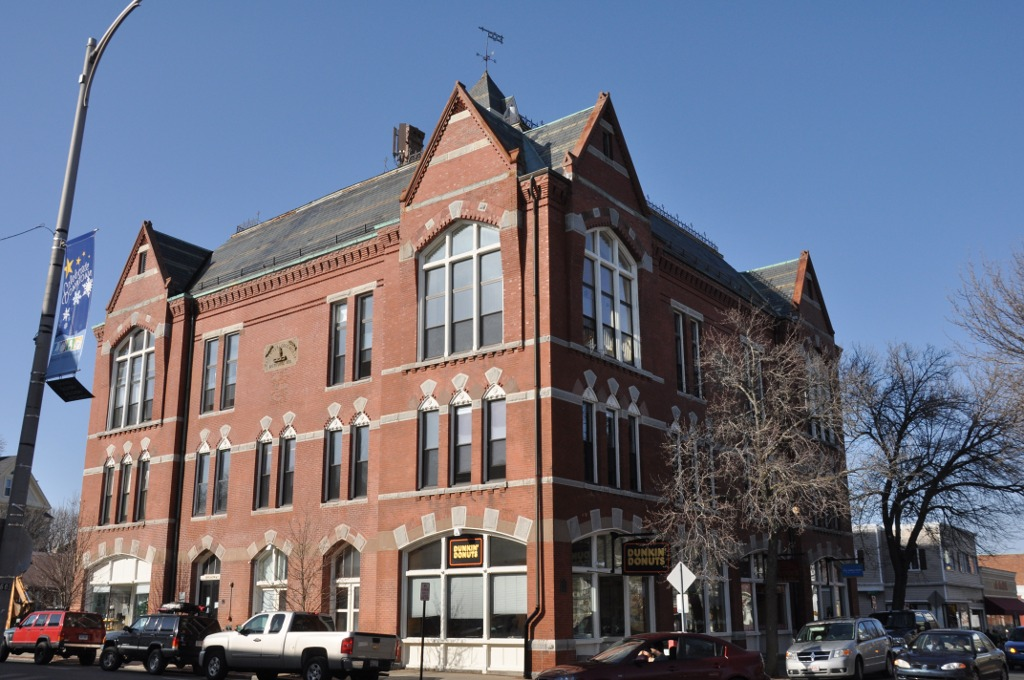

- Location within Massachusetts Location within the United States
- Location: Beverly, Massachusetts
- Coordinates: 42°32′52.4″N 70°52′45.16″W
- Built: 1874
- Architect: J. Foster Ober; Williams Brothers, et al.
- Architectural style: Gothic
- Part of: Beverly Center Business District (ID84002313)
- NRHP reference No.: 78001408

Significant dates
- Added to NRHP: November 20, 1978
- Designated CP: July 5, 1984

The Odd Fellows' Hall in Beverly, Massachusetts occupies a prominent location on Cabot Street opposite city hall in Beverly Center. It is a 3 1/2-story High Gothic Revival building constructed in 1893 to a design by local architect J. Foster Ober. Its exterior is clad in brick with trim of granite and brownstone. Its roof is a cross gable style, steep roof with polychrome bands of slate tiles. The central portion of the roof is a deck surrounded by a wrought iron railing and is topped by a cupola and weathervane. One of its notable tenants was President William Howard Taft, who had offices in the building during summer residencies in Beverly.

The building was listed on the National Register of Historic Places in 1978, and included in the Beverly Center Business District in 1984.

== See also ==
- National Register of Historic Places listings in Essex County, Massachusetts
