= Joshua Foster Ober =

American architect

- Born: September 1, 1839; Beverly, Massachusetts
- Died: August 12, 1896 (aged 56); West Newton, Massachusetts
- Occupation: Architect

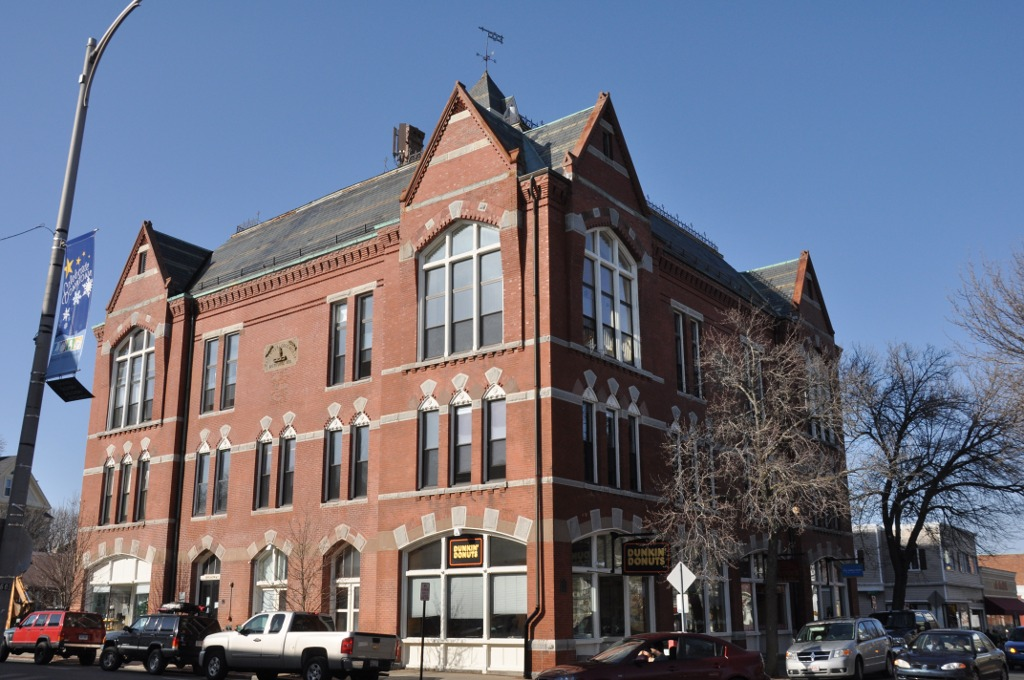
Odd Fellows' Hall, Beverly, Massachusetts, 1874.

Joshua Foster Ober (1839-1896), usually known as J. Foster Ober, was an American architect. His work included the design of the Odd Fellows' Hall in Beverly, Massachusetts, and an 1881 expansion to the Hotel Vendome in Boston. He died on August 12, 1896.

== Life and career ==
Joshua Foster Ober was born September 1, 1839, in Beverly, Massachusetts. His mother was Hephzibah P. Ober and his father Samuel Ober. He attended Brown University in Providence, graduating in 1864. Moving to Boston, he entered the firm of Snell & Gregerson as a student. He remained there until 1867, when he traveled in Europe. Upon his return to Boston, he was employed by the firm of Bryant & Rogers, and established his own practice in 1872. Outside of a partnership with George D. Rand from 1877 to 1881, Ober practiced alone until his death, which occurred August 12, 1896, at his home in West Newton.

== Personal life ==
He was married to Lucie E. Doten in 1880.

== Works ==
- Parish of the Messiah church building Foster Ober was commissioned to draw up plans of a church building located to the North and West of the Chapel (built in 1881)
- Kindergarten drawing for D. N. Skillings, Esq. at Rangely Place, Winchester, Massachusetts by J. F. Ober & G. D. Rand
- Odd Fellows' Hall (Beverly, Massachusetts) at 188-194 Cabot St. in Beverly, Massachusetts, a gothic building listed on the National Register of Historic Places. First constructed about 1850 with involved architects including J. Foster Ober, Williams Brothers, and others.
- Architectural rendering of house for S. J. Nowell at Winchester, Massachusetts, J. F. Ober and G. D. Rand
- Bennett School building
- Congregational Church, West Newton: remodel with new chapel and parlors
