= Exercise Conant House =

Historic house in Massachusetts, United States

- U.S. National Register of Historic Places
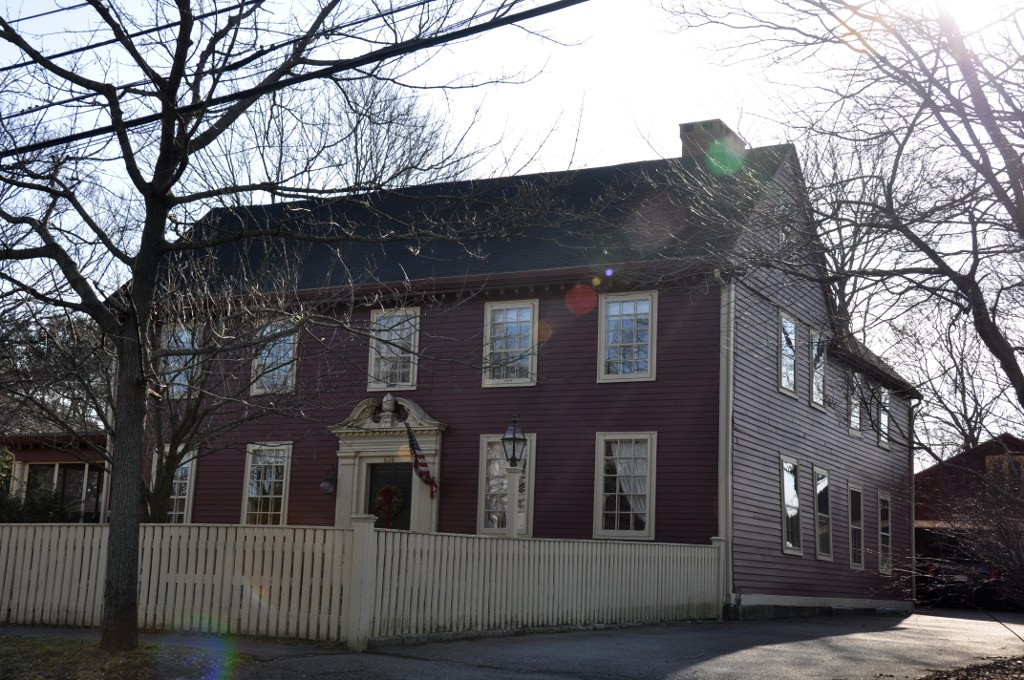

- Location within Massachusetts Location within the United States
- Location: 634 Cabot Street, Beverly, Massachusetts
- Coordinates: 42°34′33″N 70°53′47″W
- Built: 1695
- Architectural style: Georgian
- MPS: First Period Buildings of Eastern Massachusetts TR
- NRHP reference No.: 90000199
- Added to NRHP: March 9, 1990

The Exercise Conant House (also the Reverend John Chipman House) is a historic First Period house in Beverly, Massachusetts, United States. Most of this 2.5-story wood-frame house was built after 1715 for the Reverend John Chipman, and contains many fine Georgian features. Attached to its north side is a two-story single-room ell that dates to c. 1695, and was probably built by Exercise Conant, son of early Cape Ann settler Roger Conant.

The house was listed on the National Register of Historic Places in 1990. A historical marker at the site reads, "Roger Conant was a prudent and religious man who led the old planters from Gloucester to Salem in 1626, and held them together until the Bay Colony was founded. This house was built on land given by him to his son Exercise Conant in 1666. -Massachusetts Bay Colony Tercentenary Commission".

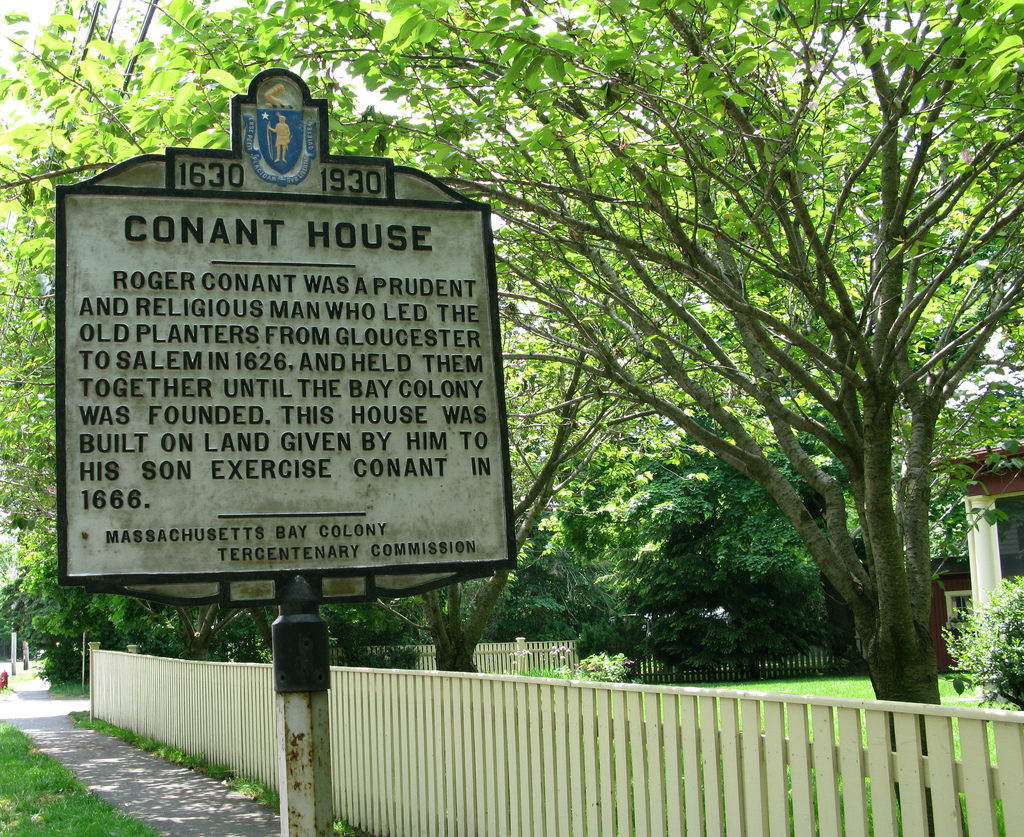
Conant House

== See also ==
- National Register of Historic Places listings in Essex County, Massachusetts
