= Hotel Vendome fire =

1972 fire in Boston, Massachusetts

Coordinates: 42°21′4.55″N 71°4′43.09″W

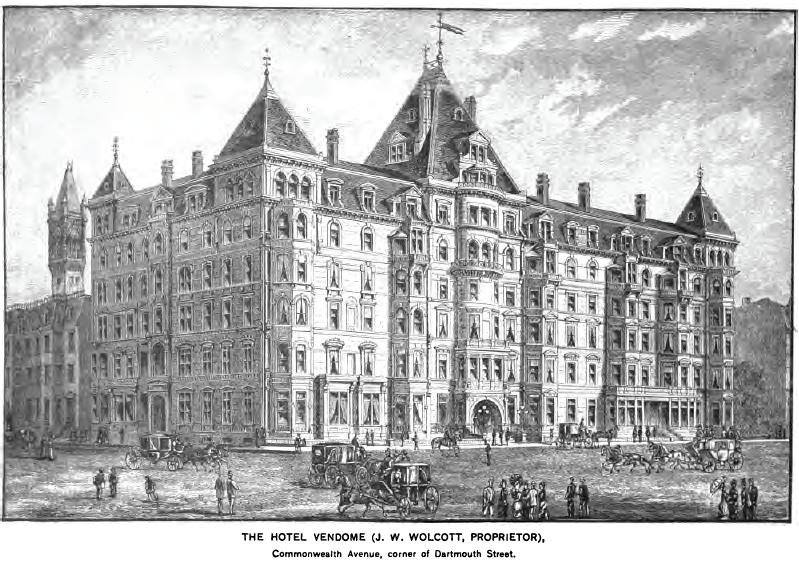
Hotel Vendome, Boston as it appeared circa 1880

At 2:35 p.m. on June 17, 1972, fire broke out at the Hotel Vendome at the intersection of Commonwealth Avenue and Dartmouth Street in the Back Bay neighborhood of Boston. The fire was brought under control by 4:30 p.m., but at 5:28 p.m. a section of the building collapsed, killing nine firefighters – the largest number of Boston firefighters killed in any single incident.

The Hotel Vendome Fire Memorial, a few yards away on the Commonwealth Avenue Mall, commemorates the fire and loss of life.

== Background ==
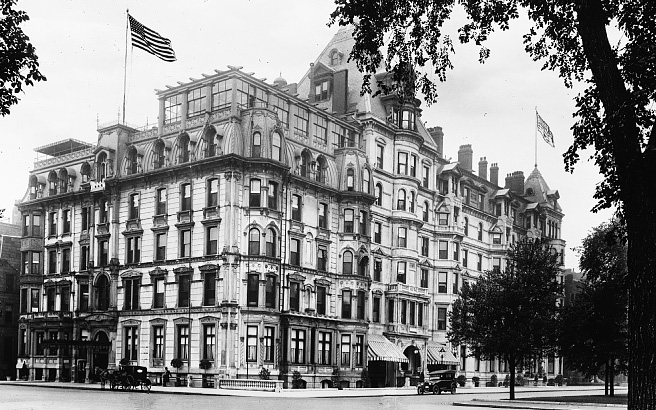
The Vendome in 1921

The Vendome was a luxury hotel built in 1871, just north of Copley Square. A major expansion was undertaken in 1881 according to plans by architect J. F. Ober and completed in 1882.

During the 1960s, the Vendome experienced four small fires. In 1971, it was sold; a restaurant was opened on the first floor and work began to convert the remainder of the building into apartments and a shopping mall.

== Fire and collapse ==
On June 17, 1972, the Vendome was largely empty except for patrons in the Cafe Vendome and a few renovation workers. A worker discovered fire in an enclosed space between the third and fourth floors, and at 2:35 p.m. a nearby fire alarm call box was activated. A working fire was called in at 2:44 p.m., and subsequent alarms were rung at 2:46 p.m., 3:02 p.m., and 3:06 p.m. A total of sixteen engine companies, five ladder companies, two aerial towers, and a heavy rescue company – comprising some 200 firefighters in all – eventually responded.

The fire was largely under control by 4:30 p.m.. Several crews, including Boston Fire Department Ladder 13 and Engines 22 and 32, remained on scene performing overhaul and cleanup. At 5:28 p.m., without warning, all five floors of a 40-by-45-foot (12 m × 14 m) section at the southeast corner of the building collapsed, burying Ladder 15 and 17 firefighters beneath a two-story pile of debris. Ladder 15 was wiped out completely. Nine of the firefighters died, making this the worst firefighting disaster in Boston history in terms of firefighters killed. The men killed were:

- Firefighter Thomas W. Beckwith
- Firefighter Joseph F. Boucher, Jr.
- Lieutenant Thomas J. Carroll
- Firefighter Charles E. Dolan
- Lieutenant John E. Hanbury Jr.
- Firefighter John E. Jameson
- Firefighter Richard B. Magee
- Firefighter Paul J. Murphy
- Firefighter Joseph P. Saniuk

The official report did not identify a cause for the fire. The building's collapse was attributed to the failure of an overloaded steel column which had been weakened when a new duct had been cut beneath it.

The Vendome re-opened in 1975 with 110 residential condominium units and 27 commercial units (including a restaurant).

== Memorial ==
The memorial in 2019

On June 17, 1997—the 25th anniversary of the fire—the Hotel Vendome Fire Memorial was dedicated on the Commonwealth Avenue Mall, a few yards from the site of the fire. The monument, designed by Cambridge sculptor Ted Clausen and landscape architect Peter While, features a fireman's helmet and coat cast in bronze draped over a low arc of dark granite. An inscription bears the timeline of the fire, the names of the men who died, and quotations from firefighters about firefighting. One faces the site of the fire when reading the names.

That a memorial be built was originally suggested in 1982, but it was only in 1995 that a final design was approved by the city's Arts Commission.

== Additional sources ==
- Bunting, Bainbridge, Houses of Boston's Back Bay: An Architectural History, 1840-1917, 1967, ISBN 0-674-40901-9
- Moore, Barbara W. and Weesner, Gail, Back Bay: A Living Portrait, 1995, ISBN 0-9632077-3-3
- Sammarco, Anthony Mitchell, Images of America: Boston's Back Bay, 1997, ISBN 0-7524-0828-3
- Schorow, Stephanie, Boston on Fire: A history of Fires and Firefighting in Boston, 2003, ISBN 1-889833-44-4
- Shand-Tucci, Douglass, Built in Boston: City and Suburb 1800-1950, 1988, ISBN 0-87023-649-0
- Southworth, Susan & Michael. The Boston Society of Architects' AIA Guide to Boston, 1992, ISBN 0-87106-188-0
