= Northshore Academy, Beverly =

Alternative high school in Beverly, Massachusetts, United States

Coordinates: 42.5693°N 70.8792°W

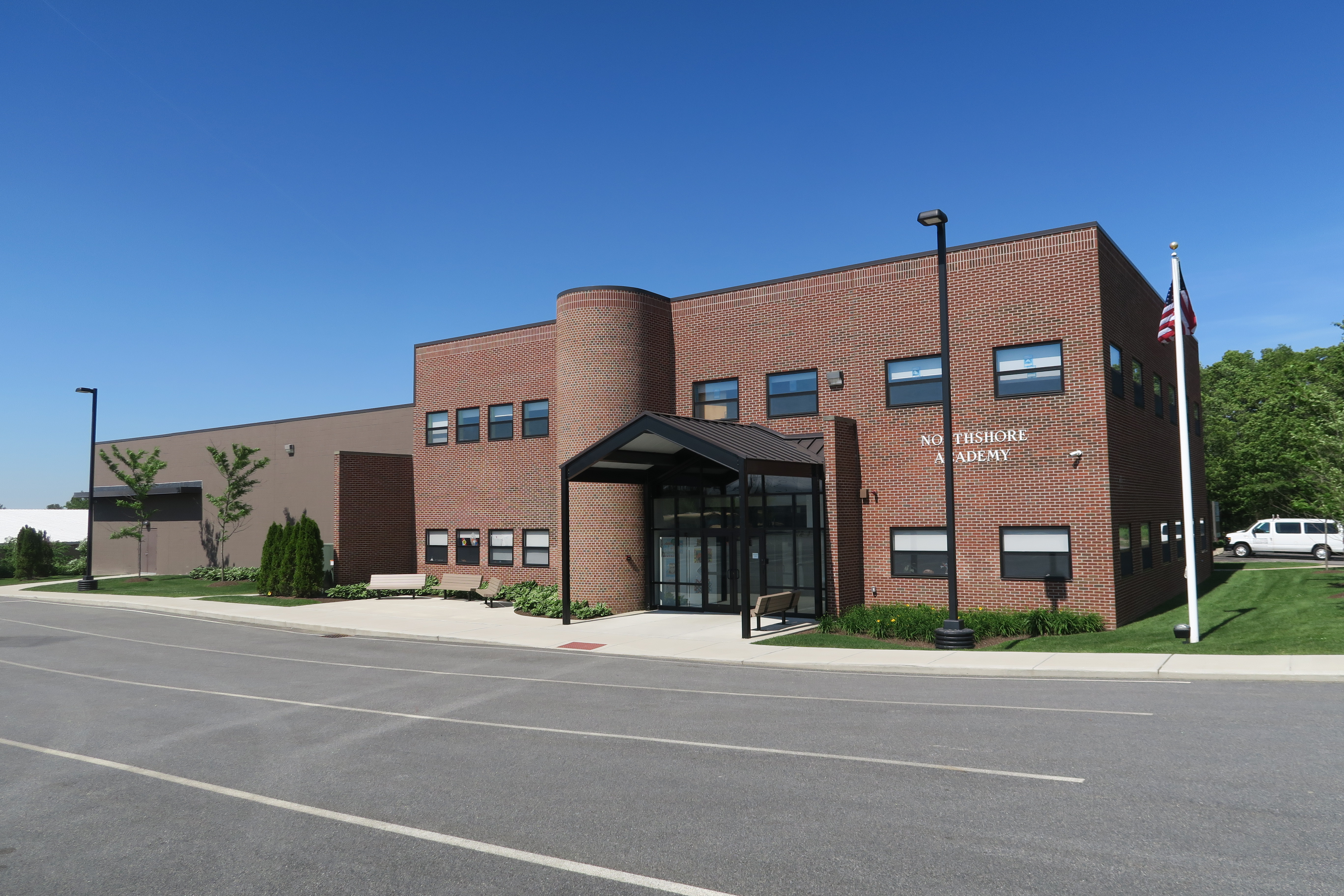
Northshore Academy

Northshore Academy Upper School is a public alternative high school in Beverly, United States, serving students in grades 7–12 Founded in the year 1975.
