= John Cabot House =

Historic house in Massachusetts, United States

- U.S. National Register of Historic Places
- U.S. Historic district – Contributing property
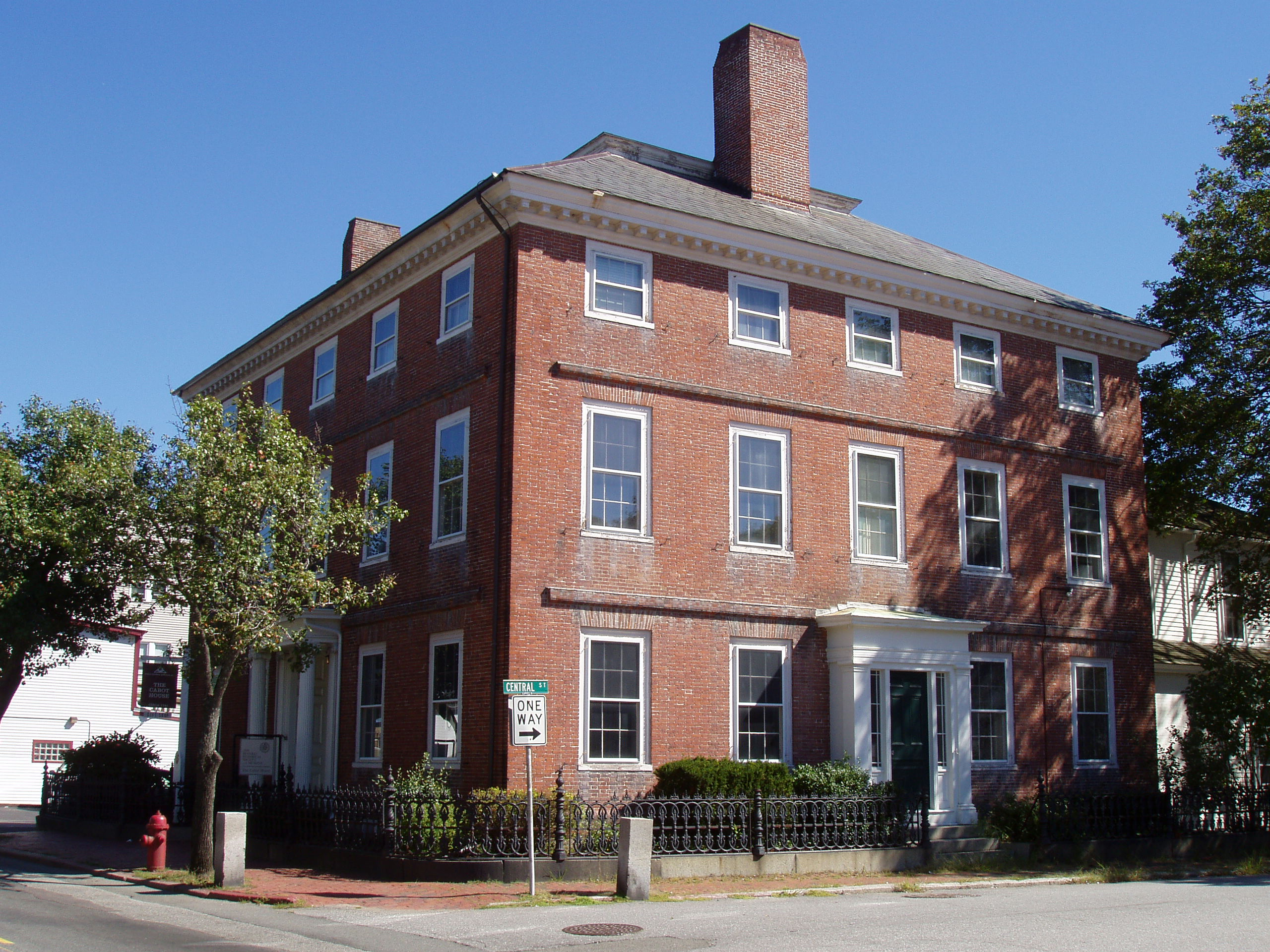

- Location within Massachusetts Location within the United States
- Location: 117 Cabot Street; Beverly, Massachusetts
- Coordinates: 42°32′45″N 70°52′48″W
- Built: 1781
- Architectural style: Late Georgian/Early Federal
- Part of: Beverly Center Business District (ID84002313)
- NRHP reference No.: 75000246

Significant dates
- Added to NRHP: April 16, 1975
- Designated CP: July 5, 1984

The John Cabot House is a historic house at 117 Cabot Street in downtown Beverly, Massachusetts. Built in 1781 by a prominent local businessman and ship owner, it was the town's first brick mansion house. It is now owned by Historic Beverly and open to the public five days a week. It was listed on the National Register of Historic Places in 1975.

== Description ==
The John Cabot House is located in Beverly's downtown business district, on the east side of Cabot Street (its major thoroughfare) between Central Street and Franklin Place. It is a three-story timber-framed structure, its exterior clad in red brick and capped by a truncated hip roof. The main facade is five bays wide, with windows set in rectangular openings with splayed soldier brick headers. Projecting brick courses separate the floors, and the third-floor windows are smaller in height, and butt against the elaborate dentillated roof cornice. The main entrance projects slightly in a surround that includes sidelight windows, pilasters, and a corniced entablature. The interior has a typical central stair plan, and retains most of its original woodwork, which is in a heavy late Georgian style.

== History ==
The house was built in 1781, and was the first brick mansion in Beverly. It was built for shipowner and privateer Capt. John Cabot (b. 1745 in Salem to Joseph Cabot and Elizabeth Higginson). Cabot was prominent in the town's economy, having also cofounded the Beverly Cotton Manufactory, America's first cotton mill.

In 1802, the house became the first office of the Beverly Bank, the tenth oldest bank in America, with Capt. John Cabot serving as one of seven original directors. At that time, it was extended to the rear by a two-story wood-frame addition.

In addition to period rooms, the John Cabot House features maritime, military, and children's exhibits as well as major changing exhibits. Historic Beverly's research facilities are also located here.

== See also ==
- John Balch House, another Beverly Historical Society property
- National Register of Historic Places listings in Essex County, Massachusetts
