= Ed Rombola =

American stage and television actor (1937–2025)

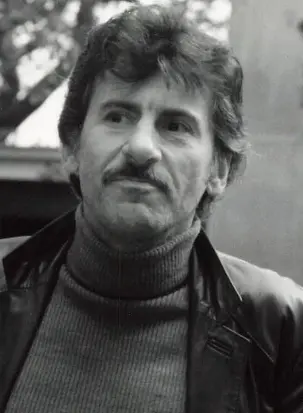
- Rombola in The Big Easy, 1982
- Born: Ferde Rombola; June 24, 1937; Syracuse, New York, U.S.
- Died: July 4, 2025 (aged 88); Beverly, Massachusetts, U.S.
- Occupation: Actor

Ferde Rombola (June 24, 1937 – July 4, 2025) was an American stage and television actor. He was known for playing comedian Lenny Bruce in the stage play Alive and Well in Argentina.

Rombola appeared in numerous stage plays such as The Royal Hunt of the Sun, MacBird!, That Championship Season. Indians, The White Devil, Sunset, The Devil's Disciple, Are You Now or Have You Ever Been, The Taming of the Shrew, Henry V and Patrick the First. He also guest-starred in television programs including ABC Afterschool Specials, Remington Steele and Hill Street Blues.

Rombola died in Beverly, Massachusetts, on July 4, 2025, at the age of 88.
