= Jane Kessler =

American psychologist (1921–2025)

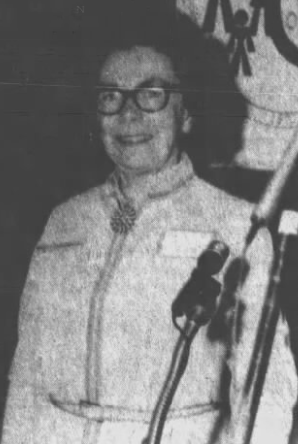
- Kessler in 1976
- Born: Elizabeth Jane Wilson; March 9, 1921; Beverly, Massachusetts, US
- Died: July 21, 2025 (aged 104)
- Education: Columbia University; Case Western Reserve University
- Occupation: Psychologist
- Spouse: Morris M. Kessler (m. 1947; died. 1973)

Elizabeth Jane Wilson (March 9, 1921 – July 21, 2025) was an American psychologist.

== Early life, family and education ==
Elizabeth Jane Wilson was born in Beverly, Massachusetts, the daughter of Dustin Wilson, a chemical engineer; and Mary Elizabeth (Nelson) Wilson, a homemaker from Salem, Massachusetts.

She attended Scarsdale High School in Scarsdale, New York, graduating in 1937. She began college at age 16, earning her undergraduate degree at the University of Michigan. She subsequently attended Columbia University, earning her master's degree in psychology in 1943, and then served in the United States Navy in the WAVES from 1943 to 1946. After her discharge, she attended Case Western Reserve University, earning her PhD degree in clinical psychology in 1951.

== Career ==
While serving in the US Navy, Kessler conducted psychological evaluations in San Diego, California. Her rank ended as a lieutenant, junior grade. After she earned her doctorate in Cleveland, she became the first-ever staff psychologist at University Hospitals.

Her career also included private practice (psychotherapy as well as psychonanalysis), consulting, and especially as a professor in the department of psychology at her alma mater Case Western Reserve University — from 1958 to 1993. She began working at the school as the teaching assistant to Dr. Benjamin Spock, often filling in to deliver class lectures when his fame took him away from classroom duties. Beginning in 1958, she organized and became director of the Mental Development Center, an interdisciplinary clinical facility at the university that evaluated and treated developmental disabilities of children.

Dr. Kessler wrote a definitive book for its time, Psychopathology of Childhood (1966), published by Prentice Hall; "the most widely taught graduate text in that field." A second edition was published in 1988.

In 1976, she was named the Lucy Adams Leffingwell Distinguished Professor. She was president of the American Orthopsychiatric Association (1978–1979). She had already been a fellow of the organization and chairperson of the Council on Child and Youth Issues, and a fellow for the American Psychological Association and the American Association for Mental Deficiency, having served as the president of its Ohio chapter. She had been president of the Ohio Psychological Association and wrote advisory articles for the PTA.

She retired from Case Western Reserve in 1993. However, as the proprietor of Appletree Books in nearby Cleveland Heights, Ohio, she continued to work.

== Personal life and death ==
She was married twice. Her first marriage to psychiatrist Dr. Bernard Diamond, when she was in Navy during World War II, was brief and ended in divorce. In 1947, she married another psychiatrist, Dr. Morris M. Kessler, who was a psychoanalyst. Their marriage lasted until his death in 1973. She was also a mother; her son Martin is a musician, conductor and educator.

On March 9, 2021, Kessler turned 100. She died on July 21, 2025, at the age of 104.
