= Larcom Theatre =

Coordinates: 42°32′53.52″N 70°52′47.14″W

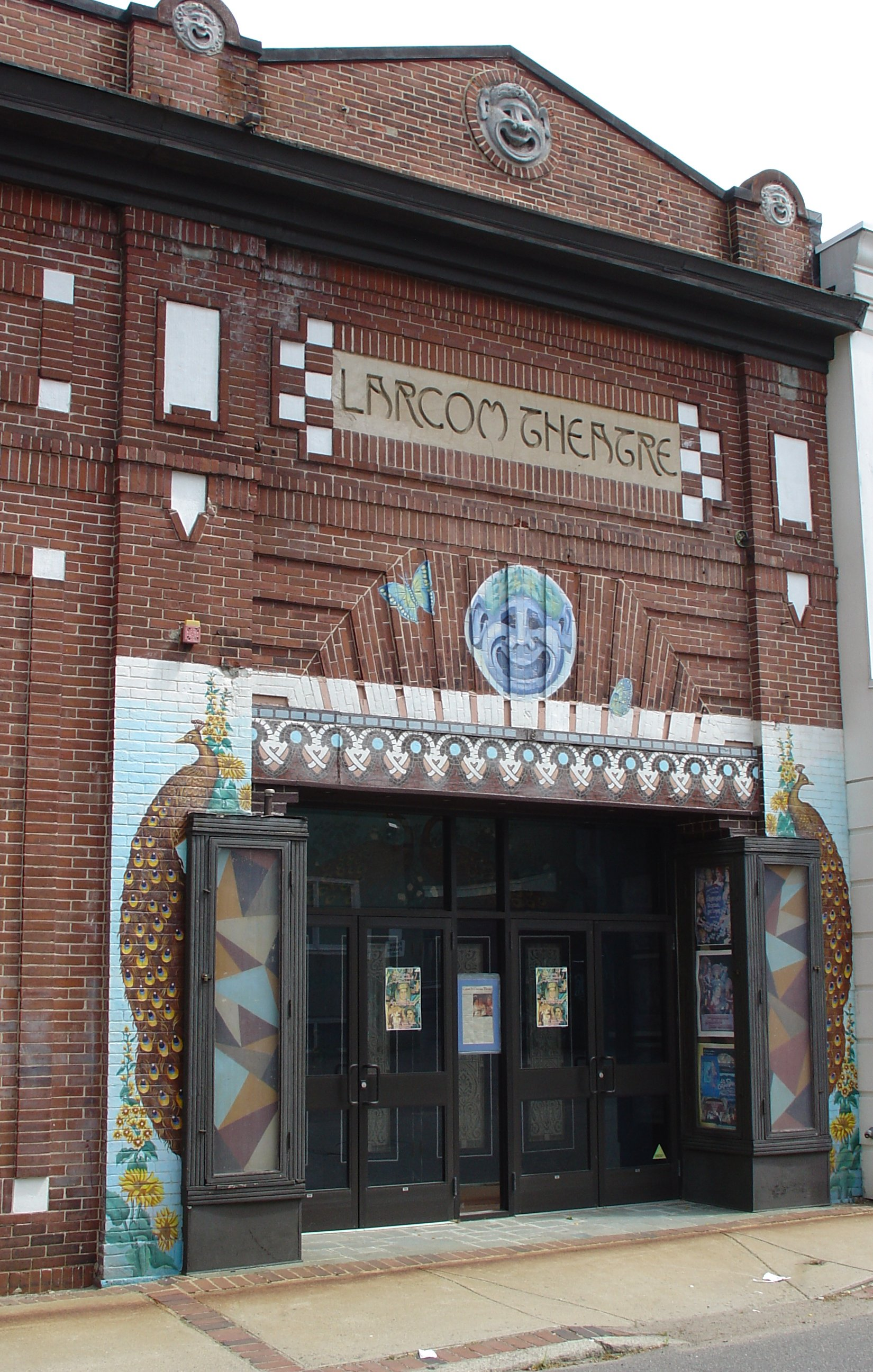
Larcom Theatre

The Larcom Theatre is a 600-seat auditorium located at 13 Wallis Street in Beverly, Massachusetts and offers live music, theatrical productions, ballet, and comedy.

From 1985 through 2012 the Larcom Theatre housed the two-hour Le Grand David production, An Anthology of Stage Magic.

Harris and Glover Ware, two brothers and former vaudeville musicians from Marblehead, Massachusetts built the Larcom in 1912 and named it for the Beverly-born poet Lucy Larcom. In 1984, the Le Grand David Spectacular Magic Company bought the Larcom and launched a restoration project that dwarfed their previous Cabot Street Cinema Theatre restoration. The Larcom Theatre was purchased in 1984 and received a balcony-to-boiler-room renovation. In October 1985 the Le Grand David troupe premiered a second resident production of conjuring, music, comedy and dance "in the style and tradition of the turn of the 19th century."

In 1995, the Le Grand David Company opened an expanded wing adjoining the original Larcom structure at 9 Wallis Street. The new wing included: the Grand Salon lobby (appointed in oak, marble, and brass), a full kitchen, rehearsal place, three galleries of Le Grand David apparatus and poster artwork, a library, a meeting room, a guest suite, and a caretaker's apartment.

Le Grand David Magic show ended in May 2012 after founder, Cesareo Pelaez, died in March of that year.

== See also ==
- List of magic museums
