= The Cabot Performing Arts Center =

Theatre in Massachusetts, US

Coordinates: 42°33′5.02″N 70°52′43.59″W

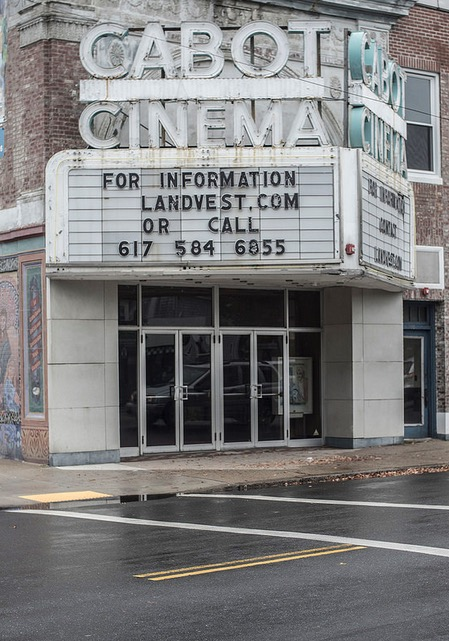
The Cabot Cinema, October 2014

The Cabot Performing Arts Center, commonly known as The Cabot, is a nonprofit performing arts venue located at 286 Cabot Street in Beverly, Massachusetts. Originally opened in 1920 as a movie palace, the historic theater now presents live music, comedy, film, and community programming.

== History ==
For more than a century, the Cabot Street Cinema Theatre has been an important part of Boston’s North Shore cultural life. Harris and Glover Ware, two brothers and former vaudeville musicians from Marblehead, Massachusetts, built the Cabot eight years after the construction of their first Beverly theater, the Larcom Theatre. The Cabot was originally known as the Ware Theatre, when it opened in 1920 and was described as having “the most impressive auditorium of its size east of New York.” Erected with significant expense and public attention, it was immediately Beverly’s grandest playhouse. Designed to accommodate entertainment ranging from silent films to opera, the theater featured ornate architectural elements including frescoes, filigrees, a golden dome, and a full balcony. When it opened, announcements for the gala premiere highlighted a "$50,000 Austin Pipe Organ", equivalent to $804,000 in 2025 dollars.

The Cabot’s architects were Funk and Wilcox, who had previously designed the Athenaeum and the Strand Theatre (Dorchester, Massachusetts). As was common in early 20th-century movie palaces, the theater included a fully equipped stage for live acts such as vaudeville and an orchestra pit for musicians accompanying silent films.

Of the approximately 20,000 movie palaces operating in the United States in the 1920s, the National Trust for Historic Preservation estimates that fewer than 250 remain today. Through January 2014, the Cabot maintained a tradition of formal movie-going and live stage entertainment under its longtime director Marco the Magi (Cesareo Pelaez, 1932–2012). He emphasized presentation and atmosphere as central to the audience experience and curated the theater’s film programming and interior decor.

== Loew's (1960–1977) ==
In 1960, the theater was purchased by the E. M. Loew’s theater chain, and was renamed the Cabot Cinema.

== Le Grand David and His Own Spectacular Magic Company (1977–2012) ==
In 1976, the theater was purchased by Le Grand David. Beginning in February 1977, the venue became the home of Le Grand David and His Own Spectacular Magic Company, whose performances ran continuously through May 2012. The production became the world’s longest-running magic show and received national and international recognition. Performances ended shortly after the death of the troupe’s founder and lead magician Cesareo Pelaez in March 2012.

During this period, the theater also continued to screen feature films until closing in the winter of 2012–2013. On May 15, 2013, the owners announced that the Cabot was for sale.

== Cabot Performing Arts Center (2014–present) ==
In October 2014, the theater was purchased by local entrepreneur and philanthropist Henry Bertolon and reopened the following month as the Cabot Performing Arts Center, a nonprofit venue presenting film, live music, comedy, and other performing arts. In 2015, Casey Soward was named Executive Director of the theater.

Later in 2015, the building was purchased by Cabot Performing Arts Center, Inc., a 501(c)(3) nonprofit organization established by local community members Thad Siemasko, Henry Bertolon, Bill Howard, Rich Marino, and Paul Van Ness.

In 2025, Brian Ridolfo was appointed President and Chief Executive Officer.

=== Restoration and renovations ===
Since 2015, the Cabot has undergone a series of restoration and renovation projects to modernize infrastructure while preserving historic features.

Initial renovations completed in January 2016 included new sound and digital projection systems, upgraded seating, fire safety improvements, and restoration of the historic marquee.

Streetside at The Cabot, a bar and small music venue near the main entrance, opened in December 2017. Major HVAC, fire alarm, and sprinkler system upgrades were completed in January 2018, supported by grants and private donations. Additional theater upgrades in 2019 included replacement of balcony seating, reconstruction of opera boxes, and lighting system improvements.

A lobby restoration completed in 2021 restored the original rose window and vaulted ceilings, expanded public space, and added a new box office and concessions area. Accessibility upgrades completed in 2023 brought the venue into ADA compliance.

The Cabot closed in June 2025 to begin a major renovation project focused on exterior restoration, artist facilities, and audience-facing improvements. The project includes restoring the building’s original 1920s exterior, renovating dressing rooms and backstage areas, installing a green room, and updating exterior signage. Construction is expected to be completed in early 2026.

=== The Cabot's Big Night ===
In 2022, The Cabot launched an annual spring fundraising event known as The Cabot’s Big Night to support ongoing restoration and capital projects.
