= Le Grand David =

On February 20, 2012, Le Grand David and His Spectacular Magic Company celebrated its 35th anniversary. The company was then the longest consecutively running stage magic show in the world, according to Guinness World Records. Marco the Magi (Cesareo Pelaez) started the show in the 1970s. The family-oriented stage magic show ran most Sundays at the Cabot Street Cinema Theatre and some Thursdays at the Larcom Theatre in Beverly, Massachusetts through the Spring of 2012.

== Overview ==
On February 20, 1977, with little advance publicity, Le Grand David and his own Spectacular Magic Company made its debut on the stage of the Cabot Street Cinema Theatre, and ran for 35 years. In 1985, the Le Grand David Company opened a second two-hour show of magic, music, comedy, and dance at Beverly's other antique playhouse, the Larcom Theatre. The two productions showcased: over 1000 costumes, 700 entrances and exits, 100 classic illusions, 45 backdrops, 35 years in a small town, 4 hours of stage magic, and 2 antique theaters. The shows were produced, directed, designed and choreographed by Marco the Magi.

In the spring of 2012, it was announced that:

- the Cabot and Larcom productions would cease
- the Cabot St. Cinema Theatre would continue showing films only
- both theaters and adjoining spaces would be available for rental for functions.

An auction of props, artwork, bronzes and memorabilia was held on February 23, 2014. With over 200 items available, the auction was conducted by Kaminski Auctioneers.

== Marco the Magi ==
Marco the Magi (Cesareo Pelaez, October 16, 1932 - March 24, 2012) is billed as the troupe's founder, producer, director, designer, and choreographer. He was also a star in both productions. He began to organize his troupe in the early 1970s and brought it to Beverly. The aging Cabot Cinema became available in 1976, and the company Marco already had been forming acquired the playhouse outright. A biography of Cesareo Pelaez (Wonderful Surprises, author Avrom Surath) was published in April 2007 (second, updated edition in March 2012) relating Pelaez's early experiences growing up in Cuba, his work with noted psychologist Abraham Maslow, his founding Le Grand David Spectacular Magic Company, and his ongoing work with the company to 2012, the year of his death.

== Le Grand David ==
Le Grand David (David Bull) began as an apprentice to Marco in the early 1970s, and is a generation younger than Marco. According to magic historian Stuart Cramer, “Le Grand David is an extraordinarily skillful magician and showman. He adds youth, verve, and graceful motion to a show filled with color and action. David’s manipulation of the Zombie [floating silver ball] is the best I have ever even the immortal Neil Foster’s.” (MAGICOL: A Journal of the Magic Collectors’ Association, November, 1993)

== Company history ==
By 1976, the Cabot Cinema seemed on the downslope of its career, offering last-run movies for pocket change. A corporation called White Horse Productions was formed to buy and renovate it. Spearheading the project was the man now known as Marco the Magi, aided by business and artistic friends. The Cabot was kept open as a movie house, renamed the Cabot Street Cinema Theatre with a revamped film program.

Meanwhile, the troupe undertook a concentrated effort to restore her full stage, which lay thick with the dust of fifty years’ disuse. Office space above Cabot Street was transformed into workshops for carpenters, painters, and seamstresses. The hundreds of props and scenic elements turned out during six months’ work were gradually put into play in after-hours rehearsals. An entertainment calendar published every two weeks began announcing the debut of a stage attraction just after holiday time 1976.

On a day remembered for heavy snow and a sizable, receptive house, Le Grand David and his own Spectacular Magic Company premiered Sunday, February 20, 1977. Headed by Marco and his one-time apprentice David, the company of several dozen performers gave weekly Sunday matinée performances until mid-May. Then a second Sunday show was added, at 8:15 p.m. By mid-summer even this schedule was not enough to meet demand. “The Whirlwind of Enchantment” offered eighteen shows in a fortnight. Boston-area theatergoers and the regional media were beginning to catch wind of Beverly's enchantment.

It would be three years before the story went international, carried around the globe by the likes of TIME and Smithsonian magazines and an enthralled magic press. Robert Lund (1920–1995), founder and curator of the American Museum of Magic in Marshall, Michigan, dubbed it “the finest magic show in the world today.”

The Le Grand David Spectacular Magic Company soon became a cultural institution. Seven performances at the White House in Washington, D.C., over 40 cover stories in magic periodicals followed. Robert Lund wrote, “Of all the practitioners of the presto trade in the U.S., none has better credentials to the title of America’s national magic company than Le Grand David.” The British magic historian and collector Dr. Edwin Dawes called the Beverly bafflers “magicdom’s most incredible venture.”

Building on the success of the Cabot effort, the Le Grand David Spectacular Magic Company purchased the Larcom Theatre, just four blocks away, in 1984 and launched a restoration project that dwarfed their previous Cabot Street Cinema Theatre restoration . The Larcom received a balcony-to-boiler-room renovation. In October 1985 the Le Grand David troupe premiered a second resident production of conjuring, music, comedy and dance “in the style and tradition of the turn of the last century.” An Anthology of Stage Magic continues to play there.

In 1995, the Le Grand David Company opened an expanded wing adjoining the original Larcom structure. The new wing includes: the Grand Salon lobby appointed in oak, marble, and brass, rehearsal place, three galleries of Le Grand David apparatus and poster artwork, a library, a meeting room, a guest suite, and a caretaker's apartment.

== Honors ==
- The Le Grand David troupe has been called “America’s national magic company” by historian Robert Lund. Like the theatres in which it performs, the magic company's thirty years of continuous performances have given its community a source of genuine pride.
- TIME magazine proclaims in its two-page spread: “With the crash of a gong, the curtain flies up and smoke billows out from the stage as a team of magicians begins 2½ hours of joyous entertainment that recalls the most opulent days of vaudeville . . . . Spectacular it is . . . The real magic about Le Grand David is the cast and their locale. The show goes on not on Broadway but in Beverly, Mass., a Boston suburb, though it looks as lushly endowed as any Great White Way musical,” (Jeff Melvoin, “Conjuring Only On Sundays,” TIME magazine, May 12, 1980).
- The Theatre Historical Society of America brought the attendees from its 2006 Conclave to Beverly to tour the Cabot and Larcom Theatres. The society presented Marco with a special recognition—the first of its kind—for “CREATING THEATRE HISTORY By Contributing To The Rich Legacy Of America’s Historic Theatres.”

== See also ==
- American Museum of Magic
- Houdini Museum
- List of magic museums
