= Beverly, Massachusetts =

City in Essex County, Massachusetts, US

- City
- View along Cabot Street

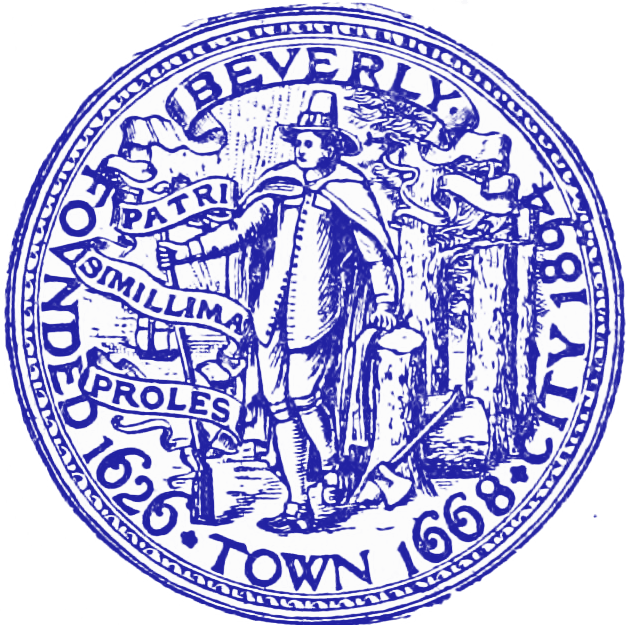
- Seal
- Motto: Patri Simillima Proles (Latin) was "May we be as our children"
- Location in Essex County and the state of Massachusetts.

- Location in the United States
- Coordinates: 42°33′30″N 70°52′48″W
- Country: United States
- State: Massachusetts
- County: Essex
- Settled: 1626
- Incorporated (town): 1668
- Incorporated (city): 1894
- Named for: Beverley, England

Government
  - Type: Mayor-council city
  - Mayor: Michael P. Cahill (D)
  - City Council: Councilor-at-Large: Julie R. Flowers (D), President; Councilor-at-Large: John Mullady (D); Councilor-at-Large: Keith Sonia (D); Ward 1: Todd C. Rotondo (D); Ward 2: Danielle M. Spang (D); Ward 3: Steven M. Crowley (D); Ward 4: Scott D. Houseman (D); Ward 5: Kathleen M. Feldman (D); Ward 6: Matthew J. St. Hilaire (R), Vice President

Area
  - Total: 22.59 sq mi (58.50 km^{2})
  - Land: 15.09 sq mi (39.08 km^{2})
  - Water: 7.50 sq mi (19.42 km^{2})
- Elevation: 36 ft (11 m)

Population (2020)
  - Total: 42,670
  - Density: 2,828/sq mi (1,091.8/km^{2})
- Time zone: UTC−5 (Eastern)
  - Summer (DST): UTC−4 (Eastern)
- ZIP Codes: 01915 (Beverly); 01965 (Prides Crossing)
- Area code: 978/351
- FIPS code: 25-05595
- GNIS feature ID: 0614200
- Website: www.beverlyma.gov

Beverly is a city in Essex County, Massachusetts, United States, and a suburb of Boston. The population was 42,670 at the time of the 2020 United States census. A resort, residential, and manufacturing community on the Massachusetts North Shore, Beverly includes Ryal Side, North Beverly, Centerville, Cove, Montserrat, Beverly Farms and Prides Crossing. Beverly is a rival of Marblehead for the title of "birthplace of the U.S. Navy".

== History ==
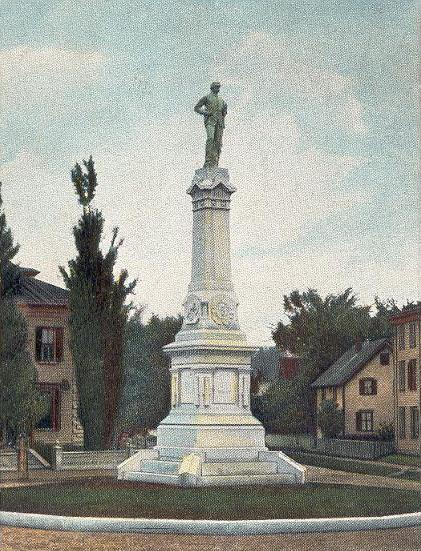
Soldiers' Monument in 1907

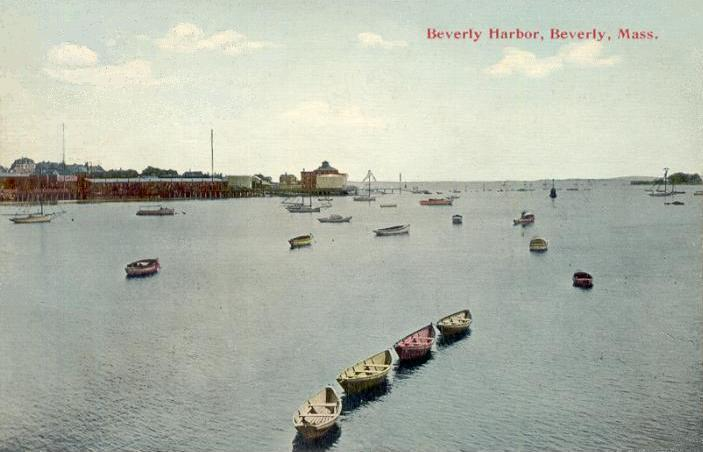
Beverly Harbor c. 1912

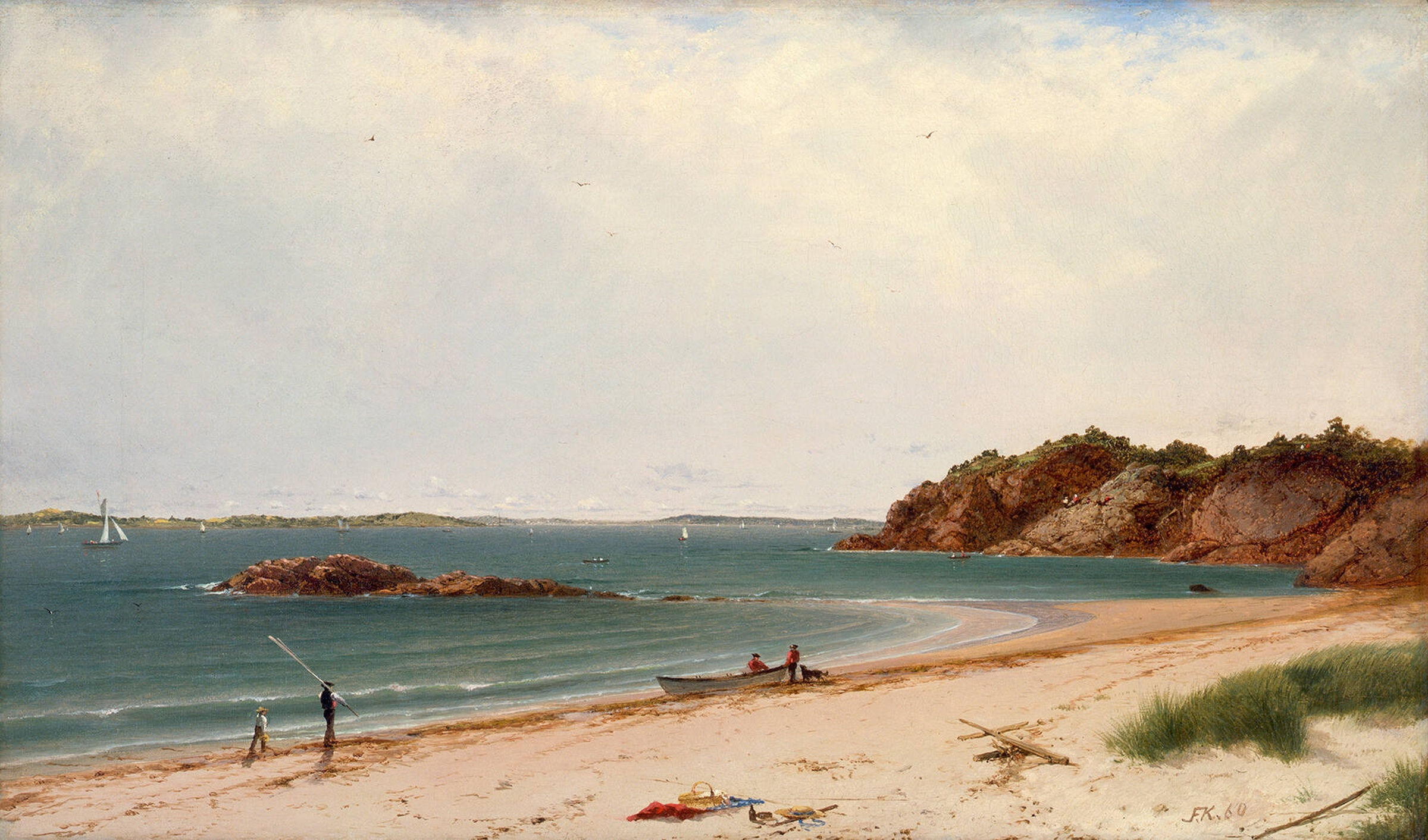
View of the Beach at Beverly, Massachusetts, 1860, John Frederick Kensett

Native Americans inhabited what would become northeastern Massachusetts for thousands of years before the European colonization of the Americas. At the time of European contact in the early 1600s, the area that would become Beverly was between an important Naumkeag settlement in present-day Salem and Agawam settlements on Cape Ann, with probable indigenous settlement sites at the mouth of the Bass River. During the early contact period, virgin soil epidemics ravaged native populations, reducing the indigenous population within the present boundaries of Beverly from an estimated 200 to less than 50 if there were any survivors.

English colonists, under Roger Conant's leadership, first colonized the area in 1626 as part of the Massachusetts Bay Colony. Initially part of Salem, Beverly would be set off and officially incorporated in 1668, when it was named after Beverley, the county town of the East Riding of Yorkshire, England. Surviving from the settlement's early history is the John Balch House, built, according to dendrochronological testing performed in 2006, about 1679.

The colonists did not initially seek permission from indigenous inhabitants to settle in Beverly; however, when Charles II revoked colonial charters to establish the Dominion of New England in 1684, Beverly joined a number of Massachusetts municipalities in seeking out heirs to local sachems and paying them ex post facto in order to establish a right to the land. So it was that in 1686, the town selectmen agreed to pay six pounds, six shillings, and eight pence to three grandchildren of Chief Masconomet, last sachem of the Agawam. They did not pay this sum until 1700.

The first ship commissioned for the Continental Army (as the Continental Navy did not yet exist), was the armed schooner USS Hannah under the command of Captain Nicholson Broughton. It was outfitted at Glover's Wharf and first sailed from Beverly Harbor on September 5, 1775. For this reason, Beverly calls itself the "Birthplace of America's Navy". Marblehead makes a similar claim, in part, because Broughton was from there and belonged to the Marblehead Regiment. However, the official history of the United States Navy and the naval history of Rhode Island contradict this. Hannah can be found on the patch of the city's police department.

Beverly has also been called the "birthplace of the American Industrial Revolution," as it was the site of the first cotton mill in America (1787) and largest cotton mill of its time. The town is the home of one of the country's first Sunday schools, which was built in 1810. Beverly was incorporated as a city in 1894.

In 1902, the United Shoe Machinery Corporation built a quarter-mile (400 m) stretch of factory buildings in Beverly. The stretch was an early landmark example of reinforced concrete construction, devised by concrete pioneer Ernest L. Ransome. In 1906 it went into production. Closed in 1987, the complex was bought by Cummings Properties in 1996, and developed into a campus of hi-tech companies, salons, restaurants, medical offices, and more. Parker Brothers, makers of Monopoly and other games, was headquartered in Beverly, acquired by Hasbro, and eventually ceased operations in Beverly. In 2012, the Dunham Road property was acquired by Cummings Properties and named Dunham Ridge.

President William Howard Taft rented a house for the summer White House from Mrs. Maria Evans in Beverly. In the summers of 1909 and 1910, he lived in a house located at what is now the site of the Italian Garden in Lynch Park, the city's principal public park, and in 1911 and 1912 he rented a different house a mile (1600 m) away, "Parramatta", from Mrs. Robert Peabody. Beverly Hills, California, was named in 1907 after Beverly Farms in Beverly because Taft vacationed there.

In 1984, the deadliest arson fire in Massachusetts history occurred at the Elliott Chambers, a rooming house located on the corner of Rantoul and Elliott Streets in downtown Beverly. 15 people died as a result of the fire.

Beverly has a former Nike missile site on L. P. Henderson Road, immediately east of the Beverly Municipal Airport. This site was in operation from March 1957 until August 1959, when the Army handed it over to the National Guard. It is currently used by Massachusetts US&R Task Force 1 and is under the scrutiny of many environmental organizations, due to concerns about polluted groundwater, which could be potentially hazardous to the nearby Wenham Lake water supply.

In April 2013, Bill Scanlon, Beverly's longest-serving mayor, announced that he would not be running for re-election in November. Scanlon first won election to the mayor's seat in 1993 and held the office through 2013 (with the exception of a single term by Tom Crean from 2002 to 2003). In 2013, Michael Cahill beat Wes Slate to become Beverly's 34th mayor.

In December 2021, Mayor Cahill received one of two top honors from the Mayors Climate Protection Awards recognizing mayors for their climate work. The award focused on two Beverly efforts: the conversion of its vehicle fleet to electric and its Green Schools Program, which involves making buildings more energy efficient. Salem Mayor Kimberley Driscoll also received an honorable mention for her work on Resilient Together, a Beverly-Salem collaboration to address climate change. Whether it involves vehicle electrification or the greening of city buildings, the coastal city of Beverly has made climate work a central focus to protect its future.

Beverly is home to The Cabot, one of only approximately 250 similar movie palaces left out of an estimated 20,000 theaters built in the 1920s. For its first 40 years, it served as a center of community life for downtown Beverly. In 1944, the venue was leased to movie chain giant E.M. Loew's, which eventually purchased it in 1962, and renamed it the Cabot Cinema. In 1976 it was purchased by Le Grand David and His Own Spectacular Magic Company. For 37 years, The Cabot hosted Le Grand David's long-running magic show that made seven White House appearances and won recognition in the Guinness Book of Records and TIME, Smithsonian and National Geographic World magazines. After Le Grand David's retirement in 2012, the venue was sold in 2014 and reopened as a nonprofit performing arts center.

== Geography ==
According to the United States Census Bureau, the city has a total area of 22.6 square miles (58.5 km^{2}), of which 15.1 square miles (39.1 km^{2}) is land and 7.5 square miles (19.4 km^{2}), or 33.19%, is water. Beverly is located on the North Shore, the name given to communities north of Boston along Massachusetts Bay. There are many smaller coves, as well as two islands, the Great and Little Misery Islands, which are part of the city. From Woodbury Point westward lies Beverly Harbor, which lies at the mouth of the Danvers River. The Bass River empties into the Danvers River from within the city. Several other small streams lie within the city as well. A large portion of Wenham Lake, as well as several other lakes and ponds lie within the city. The city has its own city forest and reservation land as well.

Much of the western half of the city is relatively urbanized, while the eastern part of the city (roughly from Woodbury Point east) is more rural. Beverly is home to several parks, five beaches, the Beverly Golf & Tennis Club (est. 1910) and two yacht clubs, Jubilee Yacht Club in Beverly Harbor and Bass Haven Yacht Club along the Bass River.

Besides Massachusetts Bay to the south, Beverly is bordered by Manchester-by-the-Sea to the east, Wenham to the north, Danvers to the west and Salem to the south. Beverly and Salem are separated by the Danvers River and Beverly Harbor, with three bridges, the Veterans Memorial Bridge (former location of the historic Essex Bridge), the MBTA railroad bridge, and the Kernwood Bridge, connecting the two cities. Beverly's city center lies 2 miles (3 km) north of Salem's, and is 14 miles (23 km) west-southwest of Gloucester and 17 miles (27 km) northeast of Boston.

=== Climate ===
According to the Köppen Climate Classification system, Beverly has an oceanic climate, abbreviated "Cfb" on climate maps, bordering on the humid continental climate type, abbreviated "Dfb". Accordingly, the city experiences moderately cold and snowy winters (though temperature and precipitation can vary greatly) along with warm to hot and humid summers. A sea breeze will often keep much of the southern part of the city cooler in the summer. Beverly is prone to thunderstorms and tropical rainstorms in the summer and nor'easters that can bring heavy rain and/or in the winter, fall, and spring. Generally, however, precipitation is relatively even throughout the year, with a slight increase around the spring and the fall. The hottest temperature recorded in Beverly was 98 °F (36.7 °C) on July 4, 2002, July 25, 2022, and June 24, 2025, while the coldest temperature recorded was −13 °F (−25.0 °C) on February 4, 2023.

Climate data for Beverly, Massachusetts COOP (June 1996–2020 normals, extremes 1996–present)
Month	Jan	Feb	Mar	Apr	May	Jun	Jul	Aug	Sep	Oct	Nov	Dec	Year
Record high °F (°C)	72 (22)	73 (23)	89 (32)	93 (34)	92 (33)	98 (37)	98 (37)	97 (36)	96 (36)	83 (28)	81 (27)	76 (24)	98 (37)
Mean maximum °F (°C)	58.7 (14.8)	58.5 (14.7)	66.3 (19.1)	77.4 (25.2)	86.0 (30.0)	88.7 (31.5)	91.6 (33.1)	88.7 (31.5)	87.6 (30.9)	77.3 (25.2)	69.3 (20.7)	60.2 (15.7)	93.6 (34.2)
Mean daily maximum °F (°C)	36.6 (2.6)	38.6 (3.7)	45.4 (7.4)	56.6 (13.7)	66.2 (19.0)	74.7 (23.7)	80.1 (26.7)	78.9 (26.1)	71.8 (22.1)	60.8 (16.0)	51.3 (10.7)	42.1 (5.6)	58.6 (14.8)
Daily mean °F (°C)	27.2 (−2.7)	28.3 (−2.1)	35.3 (1.8)	45.1 (7.3)	54.9 (12.7)	64.2 (17.9)	70.0 (21.1)	68.6 (20.3)	61.5 (16.4)	50.5 (10.3)	41.4 (5.2)	32.9 (0.5)	48.3 (9.1)
Mean daily minimum °F (°C)	17.8 (−7.9)	18.0 (−7.8)	25.2 (−3.8)	33.5 (0.8)	43.7 (6.5)	53.8 (12.1)	59.9 (15.5)	58.4 (14.7)	51.3 (10.7)	40.3 (4.6)	31.4 (−0.3)	23.7 (−4.6)	38.1 (3.4)
Mean minimum °F (°C)	−0.5 (−18.1)	3.3 (−15.9)	10.1 (−12.2)	24.5 (−4.2)	32.7 (0.4)	43.9 (6.6)	51.9 (11.1)	48.9 (9.4)	38.5 (3.6)	28.4 (−2.0)	19.8 (−6.8)	9.7 (−12.4)	−2.0 (−18.9)
Record low °F (°C)	−10 (−23)	−13 (−25)	−2 (−19)	16 (−9)	28 (−2)	38 (3)	43 (6)	44 (7)	33 (1)	19 (−7)	11 (−12)	−3 (−19)	−13 (−25)
Average precipitation inches (mm)	3.74 (95)	3.61 (92)	4.64 (118)	4.20 (107)	3.47 (88)	3.99 (101)	3.43 (87)	3.36 (85)	3.82 (97)	4.99 (127)	3.98 (101)	4.79 (122)	48.02 (1,220)
Average snowfall inches (cm)	16.0 (41)	16.4 (42)	7.6 (19)	1.4 (3.6)	0.0 (0.0)	0.0 (0.0)	0.0 (0.0)	0.0 (0.0)	0.0 (0.0)	0.3 (0.76)	0.9 (2.3)	8.8 (22)	51.4 (130.66)
Average extreme snow depth inches (cm)	8.1 (21)	10.0 (25)	7.7 (20)	1.5 (3.8)	0.0 (0.0)	0.0 (0.0)	0.0 (0.0)	0.0 (0.0)	0.0 (0.0)	0.1 (0.25)	0.3 (0.76)	4.1 (10)	13.1 (33)
Average precipitation days (≥ 0.01 in)	11.3	9.5	11.0	11.7	12.2	11.6	10.4	8.6	8.8	11.0	10.7	11.4	128.2
Average snowy days (≥ 0.1 in)	4.4	4.5	2.9	0.4	0.0	0.0	0.0	0.0	0.0	0.2	0.6	2.5	15.5
Source: NOAA

== Demographics ==
Historical population
Year	Pop.	±%
1790	3,290	—
1800	3,881	+18.0%
1810	4,608	+18.7%
1820	4,283	−7.1%
1830	4,073	−4.9%
1840	4,689	+15.1%
1850	5,376	+14.7%
1860	6,154	+14.5%
1870	6,507	+5.7%
1880	8,456	+30.0%
1890	10,821	+28.0%
1900	13,884	+28.3%
1910	18,650	+34.3%
1920	22,561	+21.0%
1930	25,086	+11.2%
1940	25,537	+1.8%
1950	28,884	+13.1%
1960	36,108	+25.0%
1970	38,348	+6.2%
1980	37,655	−1.8%
1990	38,195	+1.4%
2000	39,862	+4.4%
2010	39,502	−0.9%
2020	42,670	+8.0%
2024	43,223	+1.3%
Source: United States census records and Population Estimates Program data. Source: U.S. Decennial Census

=== 2020 census ===
As of the 2020 census, Beverly had a population of 42,670. The median age was 40.0 years. 17.7% of residents were under the age of 18 and 18.5% of residents were 65 years of age or older. For every 100 females there were 88.0 males, and for every 100 females age 18 and over there were 84.2 males age 18 and over.

98.8% of residents lived in urban areas, while 1.2% lived in rural areas.

There were 17,015 households in Beverly, of which 25.7% had children under the age of 18 living in them. Of all households, 45.2% were married-couple households, 17.3% were households with a male householder and no spouse or partner present, and 30.2% were households with a female householder and no spouse or partner present. About 31.7% of all households were made up of individuals and 14.2% had someone living alone who was 65 years of age or older. The average household size was 2.39 and the average family size was 3.02.

There were 17,887 housing units, of which 4.9% were vacant. The homeowner vacancy rate was 0.6% and the rental vacancy rate was 5.0%.

Racial composition as of the 2020 census
Race	Number	Percent
White	36,705	86.0%
Black or African American	990	2.3%
American Indian and Alaska Native	60	0.1%
Asian	951	2.2%
Native Hawaiian and Other Pacific Islander	12	0.0%
Some other race	1,192	2.8%
Two or more races	2,760	6.5%
Hispanic or Latino (of any race)	2,697	6.3%

=== Income ===
The median household income was $84,354. The per capita income for the city was $47,494.

== Government ==
Beverly presidential election results
Year	Democratic	Republican	Third parties	Total Votes	Margin
2020	68.31% 16,703	29.47% 7,205	2.22% 542	24,450	38.85%
2016	60.95% 13,185	31.92% 6,904	7.13% 1,543	21,632	29.04%
2012	58.13% 12,158	39.82% 8,328	2.06% 430	20,916	18.31%
2008	60.08% 12,247	38.17% 7,780	1.75% 356	20,383	21.92%
2004	58.82% 11,543	39.70% 7,791	1.48% 291	19,625	19.12%
2000	57.58% 10,803	34.86% 6,540	7.56% 1,419	18,762	22.72%
1996	59.08% 10,296	30.33% 5,286	10.59% 1,846	17,428	28.75%
1992	43.27% 8,507	31.40% 6,174	25.33% 4,979	19,660	11.87%
1988	50.35% 9,397	47.71% 8,903	1.94% 362	18,662	2.65%
1984	43.06% 7,791	56.68% 10,256	0.27% 48	18,095	13.62%
1980	34.69% 6,360	43.70% 8,012	21.61% 3,962	18,334	9.01%
1976	49.33% 9,399	47.38% 9,027	3.29% 627	19,053	1.95%
1972	50.70% 9,163	48.90% 8,837	0.40% 72	18,072	1.80%
1968	55.14% 9,194	41.84% 6,976	3.02% 503	16,673	13.30%
1964	71.25% 12,079	28.46% 4,824	0.29% 49	16,952	42.80%
1960	45.94% 8,286	53.93% 9,728	0.13% 24	18,038	7.99%
1956	29.77% 4,680	70.04% 11,009	0.18% 29	15,718	40.27%
1952	31.70% 5,052	68.05% 10,845	0.25% 40	15,937	36.35%
1948	40.48% 5,390	58.40% 7,775	1.12% 149	13,314	17.91%
1944	38.15% 4,741	61.70% 7,667	0.15% 19	12,427	23.55%
1940	36.32% 4,698	63.37% 8,196	0.31% 40	12,934	27.04%

== Economy ==
=== Major employers ===
- Axcelis Technologies
- Beverly Hospital/Lahey
- Endicott College
- YMCA of the North Shore

== Arts and culture ==
=== Points of interest ===
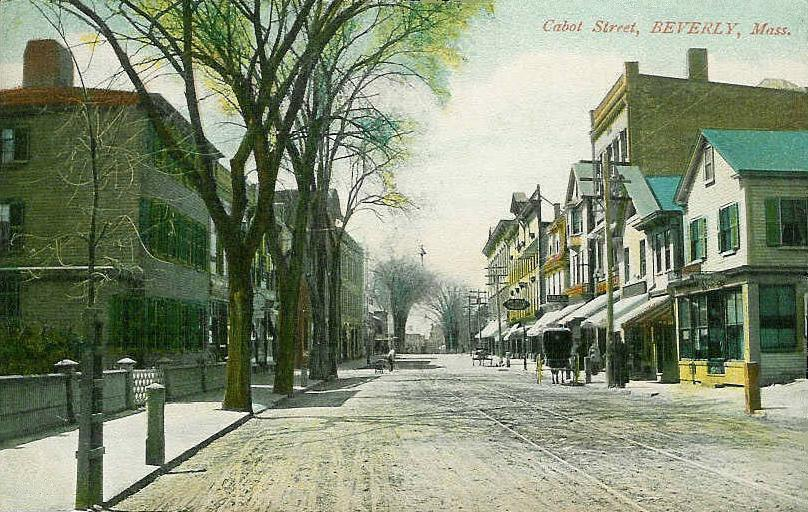
Cabot Street c. 1906

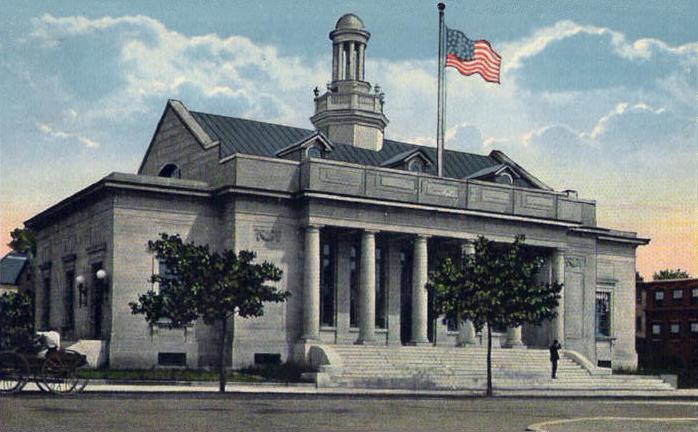
Post office c. 1919

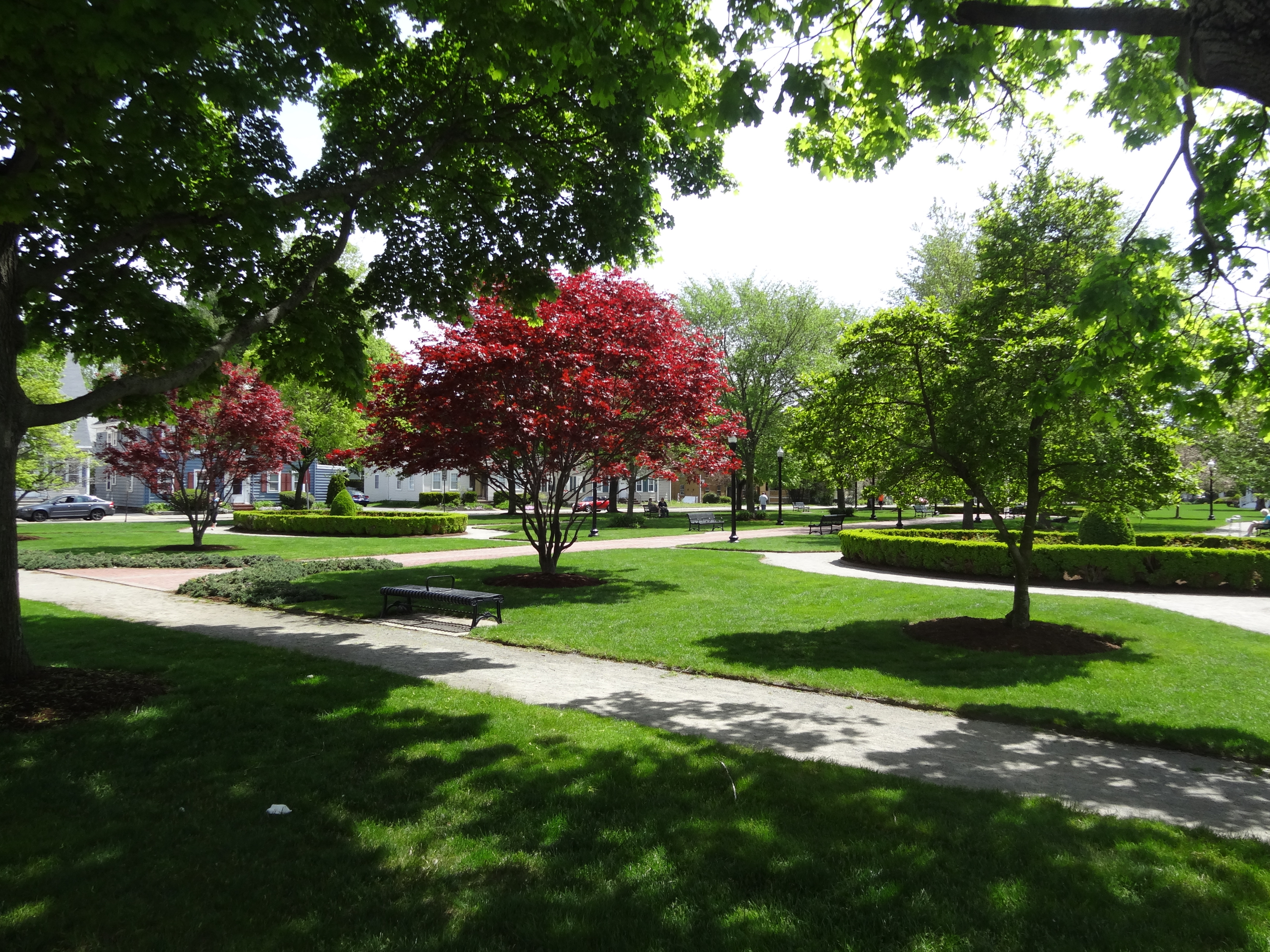
Beverly Common

- The Beverly Cotton Manufactory site, the first cotton mill in America. The monument sits in North Beverly next to the Veterans Memorial and North Beverly fire station.
- The Cabot boasted the world’s longest-running magician’s show, Le Grand David Spectacular Magic Company, which ran from February 1977 through May 2012. Built in an early 20th-century movie palace style, the theater has long functioned as both a live entertainment venue and a movie theater. Purchased in 2014 by a community-led effort to save it from demolition, The Cabot reopened as a nonprofit performing arts center and today presents a year-round mix of live music, comedy, film, and community programming.
- The Larcom Theatre, an historic multipurpose music and performing arts theatre in Downtown Beverly. Built in 1912, the 560-seat restored vintage theatre is known for its acoustics, and was built by the Ware brothers (architects of the Cabot Theatre).
- Harry Ball Field, home of the Beverly Little League—first and oldest little league in Massachusetts
- Hurd Stadium (home of the Beverly Panthers)
- John Balch House (c. 1679)
- John Cabot House (1781)
- Exercise Conant House (1695)
- John Hale House (c. 1694)
- Lynch Park & Beaches, located in the city's Cove section, is a popular summer spot for swimming, kayaking, sun bathing, and picnics.
- The North Shore Music Theatre, offering a program of musicals and celebrity concerts
- The Odd Fellows' Hall, on the corner of Cabot and Broadway streets
- Montserrat College of Art

== Education ==
The city has five K–4 elementary schools: Ayers Ryal Side, Centerville, Cove, Hannah, and North Beverly. The city's sole middle school is Beverly Middle School, which finished construction in 2018. Beverly Middle School serves residents in grades 5–8.

Beverly High School is a grade 9–12 public high school located in Beverly. It was founded in 1858, and currently enrolls over 1300 students. In September 2011, construction was completed on a new academic building, which is now in use by students and faculty.

Prior to the current state of Beverly's schools, Briscoe served as a middle and high school. Constructed in 1923, the historic building lies near downtown Beverly. Its use for high school students from 1923 to 1964 came to an end when it was transformed to the towns Junior High School, serving grades 6–8. There, it lasted until 2017 when the newly built Beverly Middle School took in the students.

Beverly is home to several K–12 private schools, including New England Academy, Landmark School, Harborlight-Stoneridge Montessori School, Kindercare Learning Center, Beverly School for the Deaf, Saints Academy, the Bright Horizons School, The Waring School, Glen Urquhart School, Shore Country Day, Mrs. Alexander's School, and several others.

In addition, Northshore Academy offers K–12 alternative public education services. Many schools exist on campus, including schools for those struggling with learning disabilities, substance addiction, and a school for people with more severe mental and physical disabilities such as Down syndrome and paralysis

The city is home to Endicott College, which offers 23 bachelor programs, 27 concentrations, and 27 minors. Master programs are offered in business, education, nursing, computer science, and political science. Beverly is also home of Montserrat College of Art, a private four-year visual arts college.

== Infrastructure ==
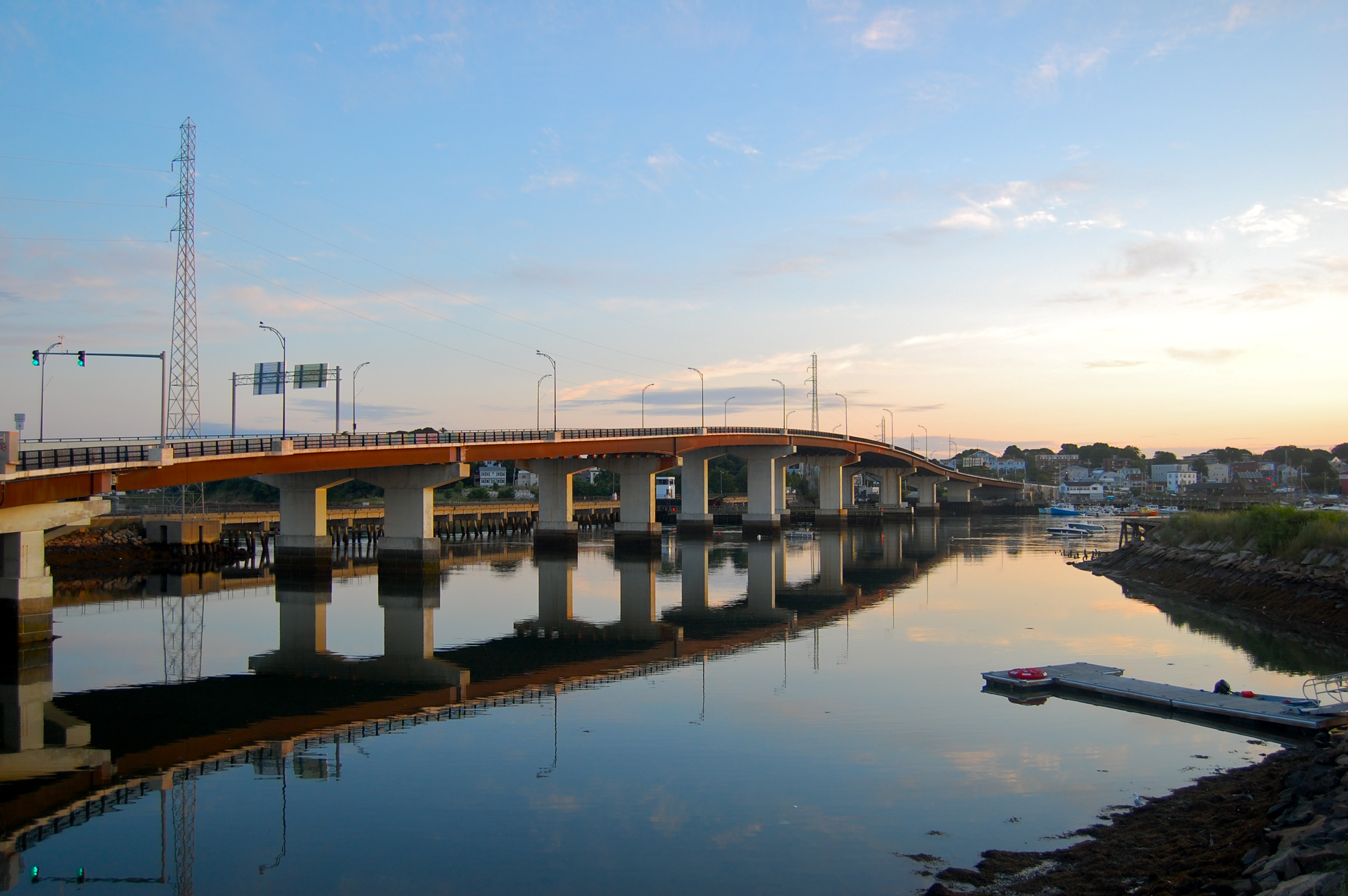
Veterans Memorial Bridge, looking toward Beverly from Salem

=== Transportation ===
Route 128, the chief circumferential highway of the Boston area, crosses Beverly from east to west and connects the city to Interstate 95 and U.S. Route 1 in Peabody. Route 1A passes through Beverly from south to north, along main streets in downtown Beverly. The city is also the terminus of four different state routes: Route 22, which heads northeast from Route 1A; Route 62, which heads west from Route 127; Route 97, which parts with Route 1A northwest of downtown before heading north; and Route 127 which heads east from Route 22.

Beverly is the site of the split between the separate lines of the Newburyport/Rockport Line of the MBTA Commuter Rail, which provides service to Boston's North Station. Aside from Boston itself, Beverly has the most commuter rail stations out of any town in the state. South of the junction lies Beverly Depot near downtown, which is accessible along both lines. Along the Newburyport portion of the line is the North Beverly stop, just south of the Wenham town line. Along the Rockport portion of the line are two working stops, Montserrat and Beverly Farms, as well as the Prides Crossing station to which service is indefinitely suspended. Additionally, MBTA bus Route 451 serves the city, with service to downtown Beverly and Salem from the North Beverly station. A local bus route called the Beverly Shoppers Shuttle serves downtown and western Beverly, and is contracted through the Cape Ann Transportation Authority. Beverly is home to Beverly Municipal Airport, though parts of the airfield itself lie within Danvers, as well as a very small portion of the north runway in Wenham. Logan International Airport provides the nearest national and international regularly scheduled air service.

The Hall-Whitaker Bridge which spans the Bass River on Bridge Street was closed to vehicular traffic by the Massachusetts Department of Transportation in June 2023. A permanent replacement is expected in 2027.

== Notable people ==
- Henry Adams, historian; lived in the Beverly Farms neighborhood while writing his works on Albert Gallatin
- David Alward, former premier of the Canadian province of New Brunswick
- John Appleton, congressman
- Frederick L. Ashworth, naval weaponer aboard Bockscar which dropped the atomic bomb on Nagasaki, Japan
- John Baker, first Mayor
- Jacob Bannon, artist, musician
- Will Barnet, artist
- Albert J. Beveridge, American Historian, Pulitzer Prize winner and US Senator from Indiana
- Briar Blush, drag queen and RuPaul's Drag Race contestant
- Benjamin C. Bradlee, Washington Post editor; summer resident; began his newspaper career as a copy boy for the Beverly Evening Times in 1937
- James F. Cahill, one of the first scuba divers and one of the first UDTs
- Nik Caner-Medley, professional basketball player for Maccabi Tel Aviv
- Bobby Carpenter, former NHL hockey player
- Rita Colwell, 2006 National Medal of Science recipient
- Nathan Dane, lawyer and congressman
- Le Grand David, magician
- Esther Earl, Internet vlogger and activist
- David Ferriero, Archivist of the United States
- Pete Frates, ALS advocate, ALS Ice Bucket Challenge pioneer
- Henry Clay Frick, industrialist (summer resident)
- John Hale, minister at the Salem witch trials
- David E. Harris, the first African American commercial airline pilot and pilot captain for a major U.S. commercial airline
- Kerry Healey, former lieutenant-governor
- Joshua Herrick, congressman
- Oliver Wendell Holmes Sr., author (summer resident)
- Oliver Wendell Holmes Jr., Associate Justice of the United States Supreme Court (summer resident)
- Corey Johnson, first HIV-positive member of the New York City Council (elected 2013)
- Jane Kessler, psychologist
- Lucy Larcom, poet
- Jack Leathersich, MLB player for the New York Mets
- Henry Cabot Lodge, Jr, vice-presidential candidate, elected official, ambassador (https://www.salemdeeds.com/salemdeeds/SearchResults.aspx)
- Mary Lou Lord, musician
- Charles Greely Loring, architect
- David Lundquist, former professional baseball pitcher and pitching coach for the Philadelphia Phillies
- Alfred Marshall, businessman, founder of Marshalls
- Greg Marshall, former NFL and CFL defensive lineman and coach, current Head Coach for the University of Toronto Varsity Blues football
- David McWane, musician (Big D and the Kids Table)
- Angie Miller, singer-songwriter and American Idol contestant
- David Morse, actor
- J. Foster Ober, architect, born in Beverly, designed Odd Fellows' Hall in 1874
- Kevin O'Connor, television host
- Benjamin Osgood Peirce, teacher
- Howard Petrie, actor
- Austin Phillips, dummy maker
- Joanna Quiner, sculptor
- Derek Rae, television sports commentator
- Peter Rockwell, sculptor
- Ed Rombola, actor
- William Howard Taft, U.S. president and Chief Justice (summer resident)
- Elbridge Trask, frontiersman and mountain man
- John Updike, author
- Joseph Vittori, awarded the Medal of Honor for his actions in the Korean War
- Herbert Woodbury (privateer)
- Nicole Woods Current member of USA Field Hockey 's Women's National Team
- Philip Gordon Wylie, author
- Jack Mullarkey, banned US fencing coach

== Film appearances ==
- The Thomas Crown Affair (1968) A bank robbery scene was filmed at Beverly National Bank, North Beverly Plaza. A car theft scene was filmed in front of Woolworth's (no longer there).
- Tell Me That You Love Me, Junie Moon (1970) A nighttime driving scene was filmed on Cabot Street from Washington Street to Bow Street. Webber's Department Store, Landers Pharmacy, Delaney's Drug Store and Elm Farm market are all shown in the scene.
- The Good Son (1993) Scenes were filmed in a house constructed for the movie at Lynch Park.
- Mrs. Winterbourne (1996) An exterior scene was filmed on Mechanic Street. Some scenes were also shot at the Beverly Farms train station.
- The Crucible (1996) Parts of the United Shoe Building (now Cummings Center) were used as a sound stage for interior scenes.
- State and Main (2000) A house on Abbott Street at Monument Square was used as the home of the Mayor (Charles Durning) and his wife (Patti Lupone). A parked Beverly Police cruiser appears in scenes shot through the front door. Additional scenes were shot at the Beverly Farms train station and at the Edwards School building on Rantoul Street.
- The Perfect Storm (2000) A helicopter scene was shot at Beverly Airport.
- The Proposal (2009) Scenes with Sandra Bullock and Ryan Reynolds were filmed at Beverly Airport in May 2008. The airport was a stand-in for the Sitka, Alaska, airport. Beverly City Councilor John Burke makes a cameo appearance as an airline passenger who cuts in front of Bullock's character as she descends the staircase of a small plane.
- Furry Vengeance (2010) Scenes with a small airplane were filmed at Beverly Airport
- Clear History (HBO) (2014) Scenes in Beverly Farms, North Shore Music Theater and Marino's Cafe, Rantoul St.
- Manchester by the Sea (2016) Scenes in downtown Beverly
- The Tender Bar (2021) Jacob's Corner used as bar in Director George Clooney's film starring MA native Ben Affleck
- CODA (2021) Shuttered Briscoe Middle School used for Gloucester High School
