= Ballardvale station =

Train station in Andover, Massachusetts, US

Ballardvale
- A train at Ballardvale station in 2026

General information
- Location: 195 Andover Street; Andover, Massachusetts
- Coordinates: 42.6277°N 71.1599°W
- Line: Western Route
- Platforms: 1 side platform
- Tracks: 1

Construction
- Parking: 115 spaces ($4.00 daily)
- Cycle facilities: 9 spaces
- Accessible: Yes

Other information
- Fare zone: 4

History
- Opened: c. 1836; April 2, 1976
- Closed: December 17, 1979
- Rebuilt: 1849, 1950

Passengers
- 2024: 167 daily boardings

Services
Preceding station	MBTA	Following station
North Wilmington toward North Station	Haverhill Line	Andover toward Haverhill
North Station Terminus	Haverhill Line limited service via Wildcat Branch	Andover toward Haverhill
Location

Ballardvale station is an MBTA Commuter Rail station on the Haverhill Line, located in the Ballardvale village of Andover, Massachusetts. The station has a single side platform serving a single track.

== History ==
=== Boston and Maine Railroad ===
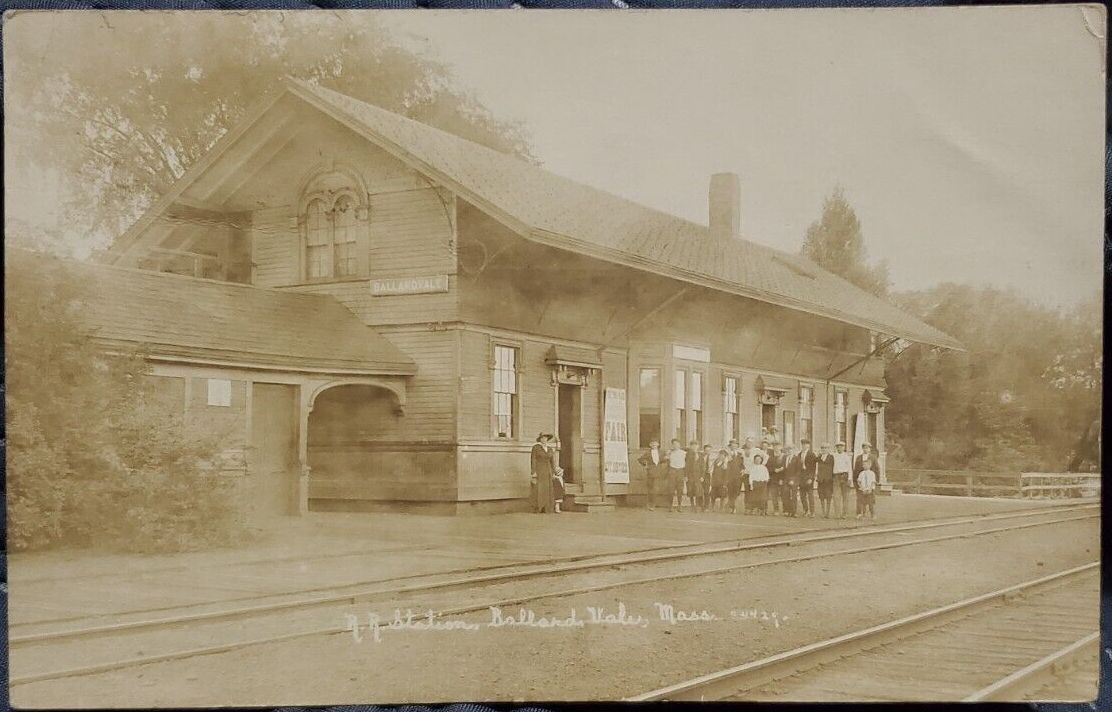
Postcard of the second Ballardvale station

The Andover and Haverhill Railroad opened through Ballardvale in 1836. In 1849, the Boston and Maine Railroad moved the line about 0.5 miles (1 km) west to its present alignment as part of a lengthy relocation to serve the growing mill city of Lawrence. The original depot was converted to a residence.

A two-story Italianate depot was built in 1849 at the Andover Street crossing to serve as the new Ballardvale station. A baggage room was added around 1893. In 1950, it was cut in half, moved 150 feet (46 m), and converted to a private residence. The baggage room was detached and served as the station shelter for some time.

The Massachusetts Bay Transportation Authority (MBTA) was formed in 1964 to subsidize suburban commuter rail service. Andover was outside the MBTA district. On January 4, 1965, the B&M discontinued most interstate service. The only service north of Haverhill was a single Boston–Dover round trip. On January 18, 1965, the B&M discontinued almost all remaining intrastate service outside the MBTA district. This left only the Dover round trip serving Andover. It was cut to Haverhill on June 30, 1967, with Andover and the other towns outside the district subsidizing the train.

In November 1974, North Andover and Andover declined to renew their subsidies. Service to North Andover station ended on November 15 that year. Days before, Andover commuters and businesses raised funds to continue service until April 1975. On April 7, 1975, town residents voted "overwhelmingly" to reimburse the commuters and subsidize service for an additional year. The town declined to subsidize further service, and the three Andover stops (Shawsheen, Andover, and Ballardvale) were dropped effective April 2, 1976. The round trip, by then stopping just at Lawrence, Bradford and Haverhill, was ended on June 30, 1976.

=== Restored service ===
The 1992-built mini-high platform

The MBTA purchased most of the B&M commuter assets, including the Western Route, on December 27, 1976. Planning began in 1978 for restoration of Haverhill service using the Merrimack Valley Regional Transit Authority as a funding intermediary. Haverhill Line service returned on December 17, 1979, including the resumption of the Ballardvale stop. In January 1989, the MBTA allocated $770,000 for new parking lots and accessible mini-high platforms at Ballardvale and Andover. The platforms at the two stations were constructed in 1992.

Ballardvale station was left as single track after the 2010–2017 double-tracking project. However, the MBTA planned to later reconstruct the station and add a second track. In August 2026, the MBTA received a $139.6 million grant from the Federal Railroad Administration to add 6.8 miles (10.9 km) of double track between Reading and Andover. The project will include reconstruction of Ballardvale and three other stations with accessible mini-high platforms. Construction at Ballardvale, which will include a short section of second track through the station, was expected to take place in 2028 and 2029.
