= Andover station (MBTA) =

Train station in Andover, Massachusetts, US

Andover
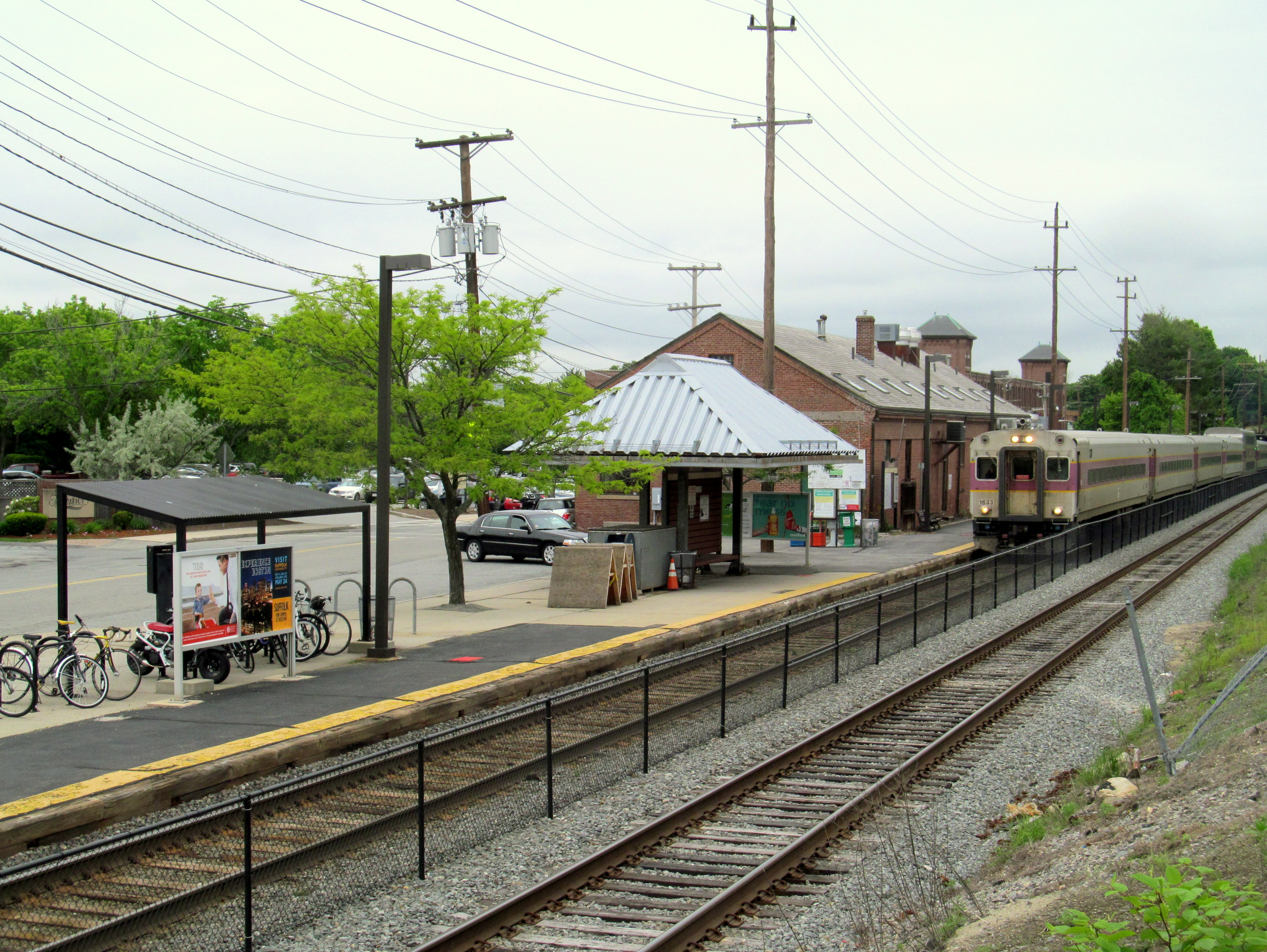
- An inbound train arriving at Andover station in 2017

General information
- Location: 17 Railroad Street; Andover, Massachusetts
- Coordinates: 42.6579°N 71.1446°W
- Line: Western Route
- Platforms: 1 side platform
- Tracks: 2
- Connections: MVRTA: 21

Construction
- Parking: 150 spaces
- Cycle facilities: 6 spaces
- Accessible: Yes

Other information
- Fare zone: 5

Passengers
- 2024: 247 daily boardings

Services
Preceding station	MBTA	Following station
Ballardvale toward North Station	Haverhill Line	Lawrence toward Haverhill
Former services
Preceding station	Boston and Maine Railroad	Following station
Ballardvale toward Boston	Western Route	Shawsheen toward Portland
Ballardvale toward Boston	Boston – Dover until 1967	Shawsheen toward Dover
Ballardvale toward Boston	Boston – Haverhill	Shawsheen toward Haverhill
- Third Railroad Station
- U.S. National Register of Historic Places
- Location: 100 School Street, Andover, Massachusetts
- Coordinates: 42°39′23″N 71°8′43″W
- Area: 9 acres (3.6 ha)
- Built: 1906-07
- Architectural style: Shingle Style
- MPS: Town of Andover MRA
- NRHP reference No.: 82004809
- Added to NRHP: June 10, 1982
Location

Andover station is an MBTA Commuter Rail station in Andover, Massachusetts. It serves the Haverhill Line. The station has one platform with a mini-high platform for accessibility serving one track, while the second track lacks a platform. The previous station building, used from 1907 to 1959, is still extant; it was added to the National Register of Historic Places in 1982 as Third Railroad Station.

== History ==
=== Early stations ===
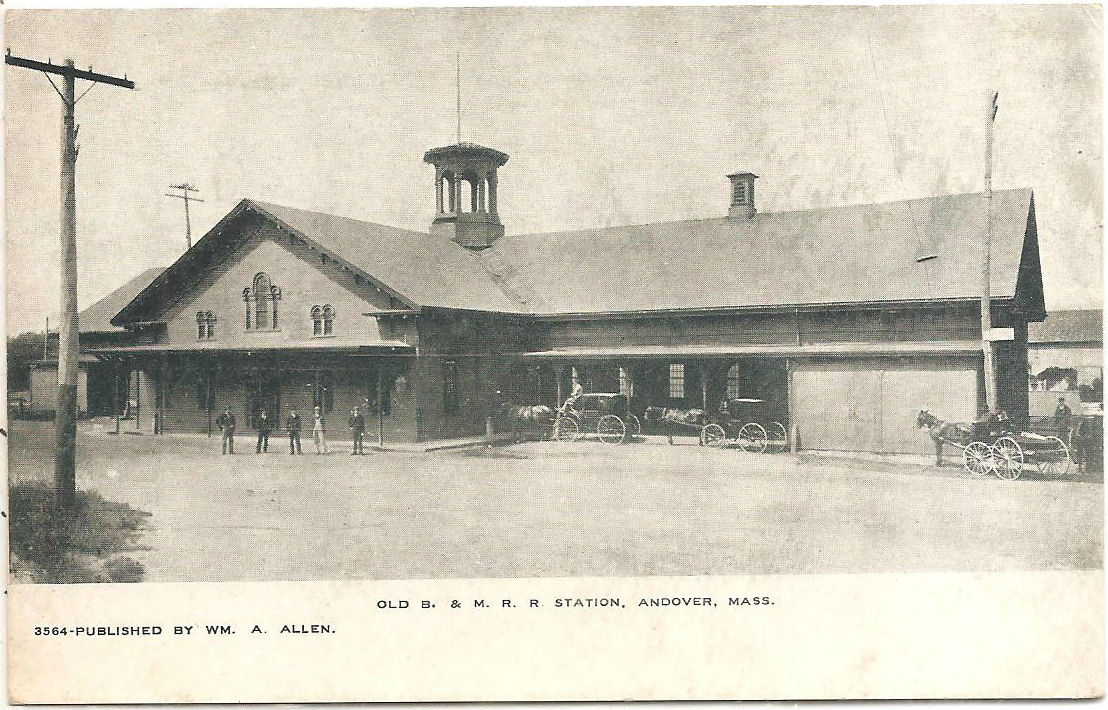
The c.-1848 built station on a c. 1905 postcard

The Andover and Wilmington Railroad opened between its namesake cities in August 1836 as a branch line off the new Boston and Lowell Railroad (B&L). A small wooden Greek Revival station was built near the center of Andover. The line was soon extended north, and in 1842 in merged into the Boston and Maine Railroad (B&M). After building its own route to Boston in 1845, the B&M looked to expand its passenger base to compete with the B&L. In 1848, the B&M relocated its main line from Ballardvale to North Andover to the west in order to serve the new mill town of Lawrence.

The line was moved several blocks west in Andover, away from the busy intersections of the town square. A small house was converted into a temporary station, which was soon replaced by a larger L-shaped station with a large train shed. A brick freight house was built sometime between then and 1875.

=== 1907 station ===
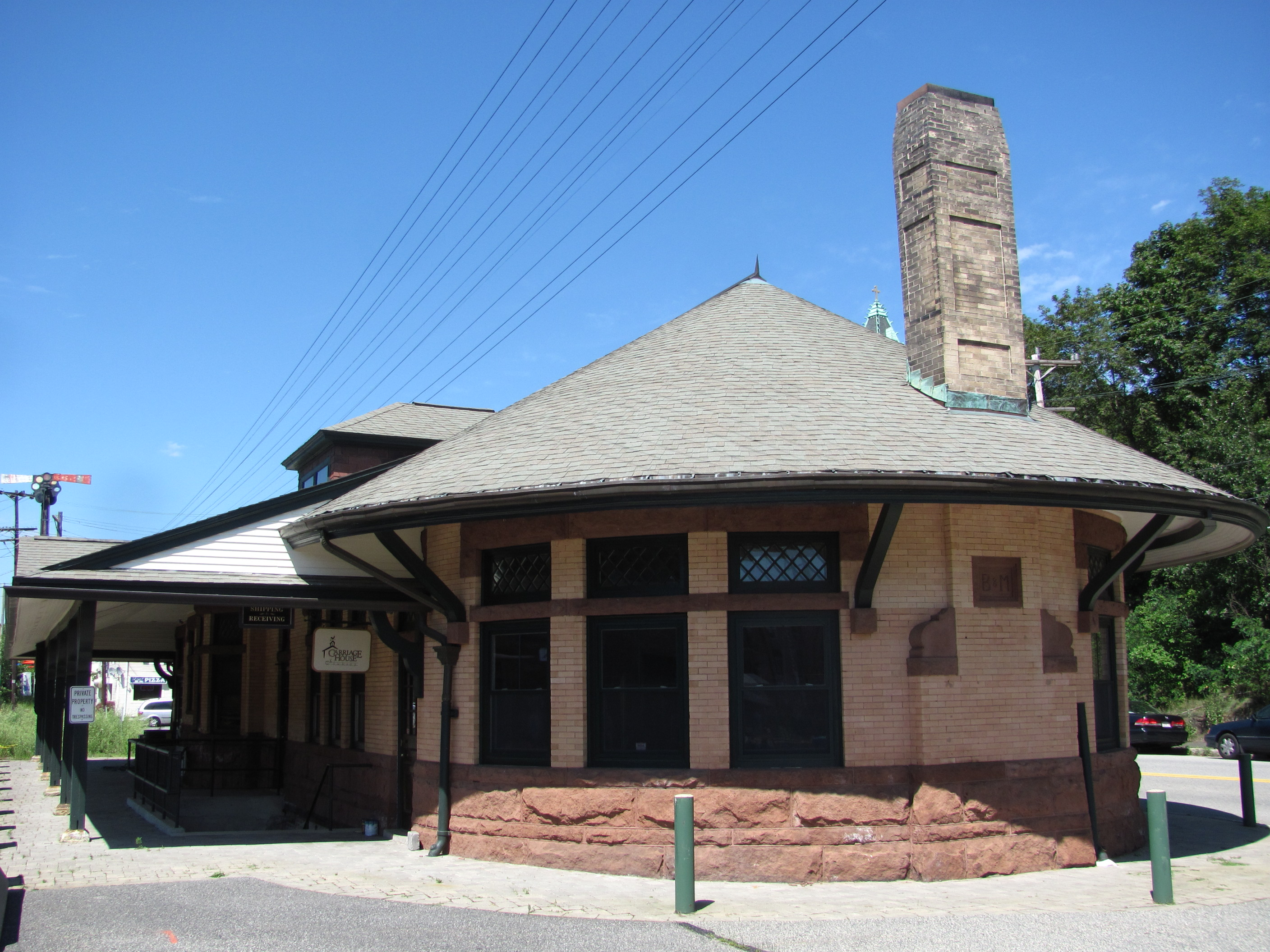
The 1907-built station in 2011

In 1906, the B&M began construction of a new station, as residents complained about the smoky conditions inside the train shed. The new station, a copy of Beverly Depot designed by Bradford Lee Gilbert a decade earlier, opened on September 1, 1907. The plans were drawn up by B&M architect Henry B. Fletcher. The cost of removing the old station and building the new one was $50,000. It was used as the station until 1959. It was later converted for commercial use, housing an auto parts store by 1977. In 1982, it was added to the National Register of Historic Places as Third Railroad Station.

The Massachusetts Bay Transportation Authority (MBTA) was formed in 1964 to subsidize suburban commuter rail service. Andover was outside the MBTA district. On January 4, 1965, the B&M discontinued most interstate service. The only service north of Haverhill was a single Boston–Dover round trip. On January 18, 1965, the B&M discontinued almost all remaining intrastate service outside the MBTA district. This left only the Dover round trip serving Andover. It was cut to Haverhill on June 30, 1967, with Andover and the other towns outside the district subsidizing the train.

In November 1974, North Andover and Andover declined to renew their subsidies. Service to North Andover station ended on November 15. Days before, Andover commuters and businesses raised funds to continue service until April 1975. On April 7, 1975, town residents voted "overwhelmingly" to reimburse the commuters and subsidize service for an additional year. The town declined to subsidize further service, and the three Andover stops (Shawsheen, Andover, and Ballardvale) were dropped effective April 2, 1976. The round trip, by then stopping just at Lawrence, Bradford and Haverhill, was ended in June 1976.

=== Restored service ===
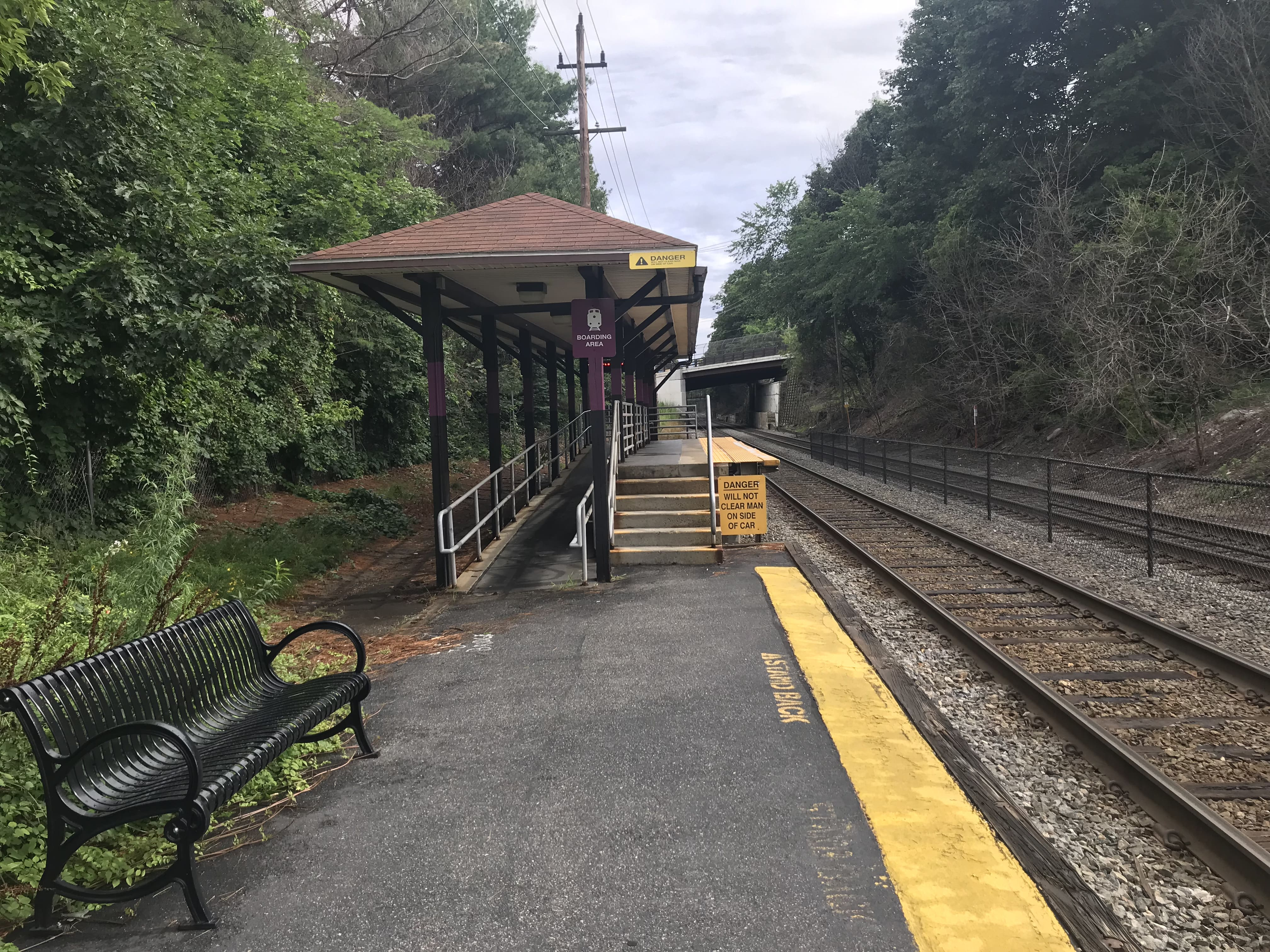
The 1992-built mini-high platform

The MBTA purchased most of the B&M commuter assets, including the Western Route, on December 27, 1976. Planning began in 1978 for restoration of Haverhill service using the Merrimack Valley Regional Transit Authority as a funding intermediary. Haverhill Line service returned on December 17, 1979, including the resumption of the Lawrence stop. In January 1989, the MBTA allocated $770,000 for new parking lots and accessible mini-high platforms at Ballardvale and Andover. The platforms at the two stations were constructed in 1992. MBTA passengers board from a single platform behind the former freight house. Both the former station and former freight house have been repurposed for commercial use. A second track was built through the station in 2015–2017. The originally-planned second MBTA platform was not built; by 2022, the second track was largely used for idling freight trains.

In August 2026, the MBTA received a $139.6 million grant from the Federal Railroad Administration to add 6.8 miles (10.9 km) of double track between Reading and Andover. The project will include reconstruction of Andover and three other stations with accessible mini-high platforms. Construction at Andover was expected to take place in 2028 and 2029.

== See also ==
- National Register of Historic Places listings in Andover, Massachusetts
