= McGovern Transportation Center =

Transit station in Lawrence, Massachusetts, US

Lawrence
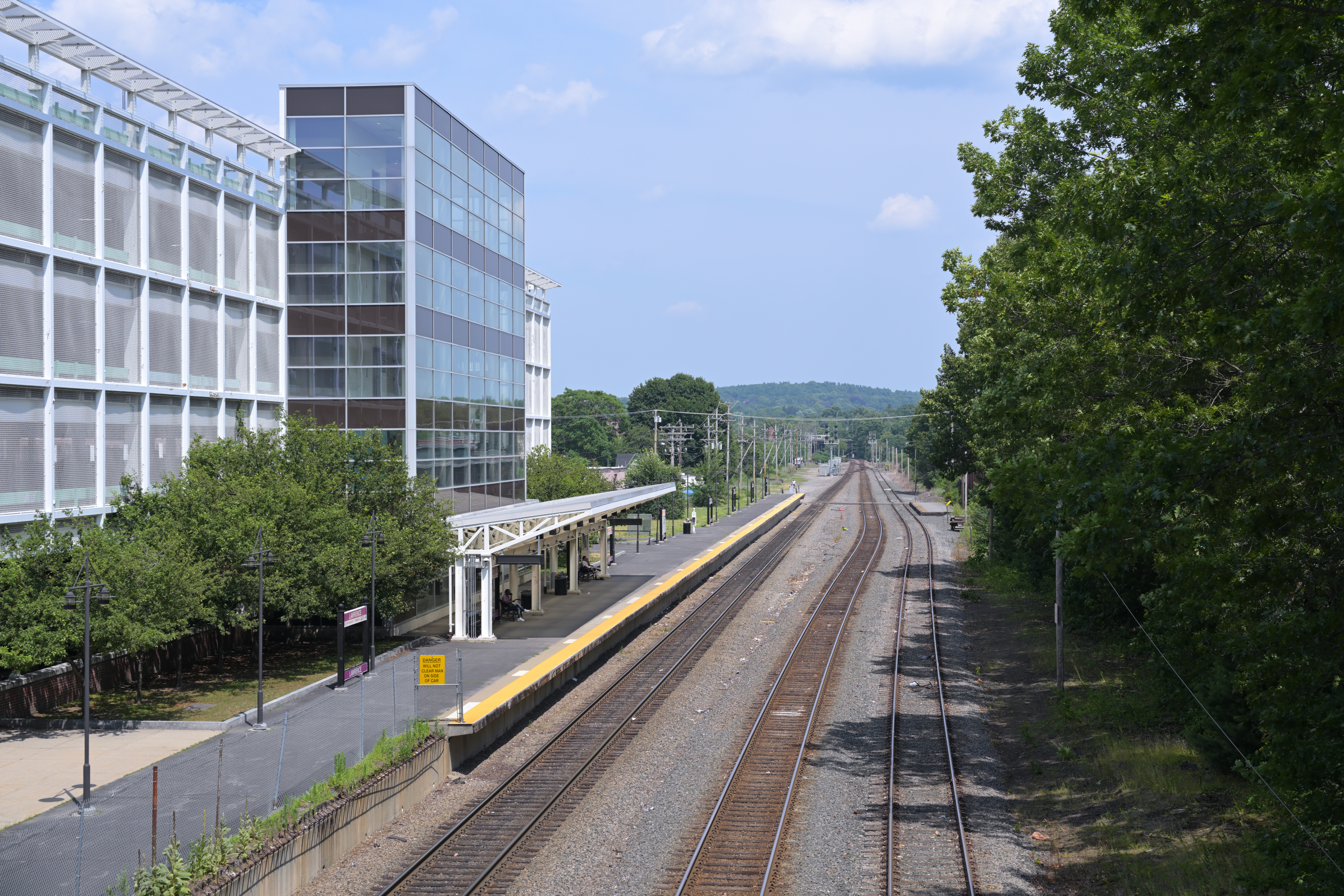
- McGovern Transportation Center in 2025

General information
- Location: 211 Merrimack Street; Lawrence, Massachusetts
- Coordinates: 42°42′7″N 71°9′9″W
- Owner: Merrimack Valley Regional Transit Authority
- Line: Western Route
- Platforms: 1 side platform
- Tracks: 3
- Connections: MVRTA: 0, 1, 2, 3, 4, 5, 6, 7, 8, 9, 10, 11, 12, 14, 24, 26, 28

Construction
- Parking: 400 spaces
- Cycle facilities: 18 spaces
- Accessible: Yes

Other information
- Fare zone: 6

History
- Opened: 1848, 1979
- Closed: 1976
- Rebuilt: 1931, 2005 (relocated)

Passengers
- 2024: 298 daily boardings

Services
Preceding station	MBTA	Following station
Andover toward North Station	Haverhill Line	Bradford toward Haverhill
Former services
Preceding station	Boston and Maine Railroad	Following station
Shawsheen toward Boston	Western Route	North Andover toward Portland
Shawsheen toward Boston	Boston – Dover until 1967	North Andover toward Dover
Shawsheen toward Boston	Boston – Haverhill	North Andover toward Haverhill
Location

The Senator Patricia McGovern Transportation Center, also known as the McGovern Transportation Center or simply Lawrence station, is a transit station in Lawrence, Massachusetts. It serves the MBTA Commuter Rail Haverhill Line and Merrimack Valley Regional Transit Authority local bus service. The station, which opened in 2005, is the latest of seven distinct stations located in Lawrence since 1848; it is located in the city's Gateway District.

== History ==
=== Early stations ===
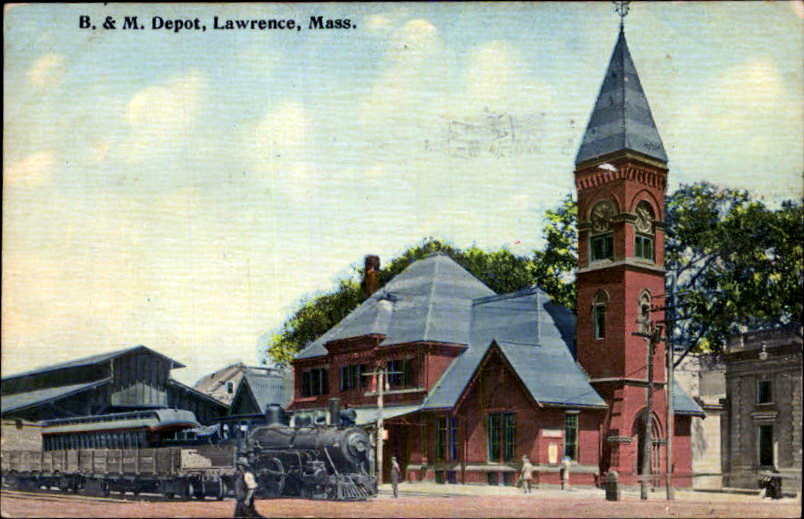
1879 North Lawrence station in 1915

The city of Lawrence was chartered in 1846, several years after the Boston & Maine Railroad opened. In 1848, the original tracks from Ballardvale to North Andover were abandoned and the route was relocated to the modern routing through Lawrence south of the Merrimack River. That year, the B&M set a land speed record for railed vehicles by operating the first authenticated 60 mph (96.6 km/h) train, The Antelope, from Boston to Lawrence, travelling 26 miles in 26 minutes.

The first station in Lawrence, South Lawrence, was a wooden structure built in 1848 just north of Salem Street. It was enlarged just two years after construction, then replaced in 1872 by a brick depot between Salem and Andover Streets.

In 1849, the Manchester and Lawrence Railroad was built from South Lawrence depot north through Lawrence proper. A new station was located at Essex Street and named North Lawrence; the original wooden building was replaced in 1851 by a permanent building (similar to the depot at Andover) then in 1879 by a Victorian Gothic brick structure. In 1880, the Boston and Lowell Railroad extended the 1848-built Lowell and Lawrence Railroad to a new depot north of the Merrimack River on Canal Street. After the B&M absorbed the B&L in 1887 the depot became redundant, though it saw service until 1918. Passenger service on the Lawrence & Lowell ended in 1926.

=== Consolidation ===
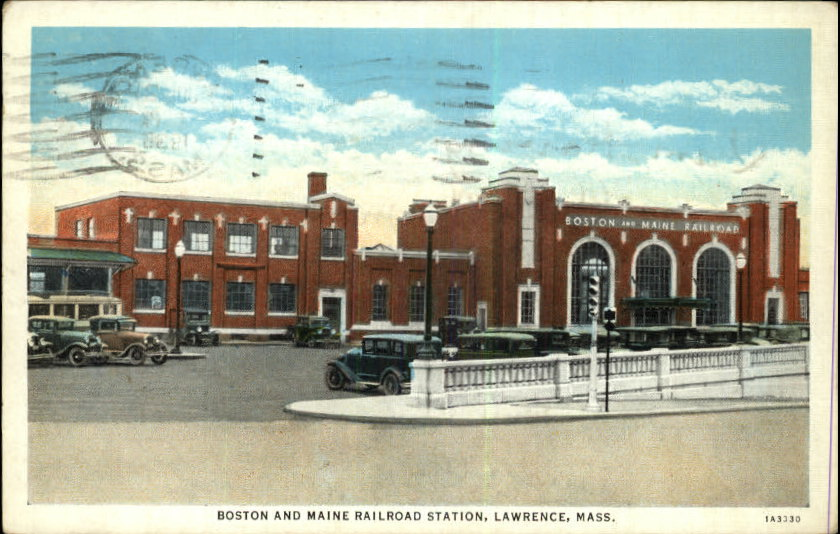
The 1931-built Lawrence station

In 1931, the Boston & Maine consolidated the existing South and North Lawrence into a single station, Lawrence, located off Parker Street. The tall brick and marble building, technically located at 65 Merrimack Street still stands as part of a strip mall. Passenger service on the Manchester and Lawrence ended in 1953.

The Massachusetts Bay Transportation Authority (MBTA) was formed in 1964 to subsidize suburban commuter rail service. Lawrence was outside the MBTA district. On January 4, 1965, the B&M discontinued most interstate service. The only service north of Haverhill was a single Boston–Dover round trip. On January 18, 1965, the B&M discontinued almost all remaining intrastate service outside the MBTA district. This left only the Dover round trip serving Lawrence. It was cut to Haverhill on June 30, 1967, with Lawrence and the other towns outside the district subsidizing the train.

The single Haverhill round trip ended on June 30, 1976, due to a loss of state subsidies, ending service to Lawrence. The MBTA purchased most of the B&M commuter assets, including the Western Route, on December 27, 1976. Planning began in 1978 for restoration of Haverhill service using the Merrimack Valley Regional Transit Authority as a funding intermediary. Haverhill Line service returned on December 17, 1979, including the resumption of the Lawrence stop. A mini-high platform for accessibility was added around 1992.

=== McGovern Transportation Center ===
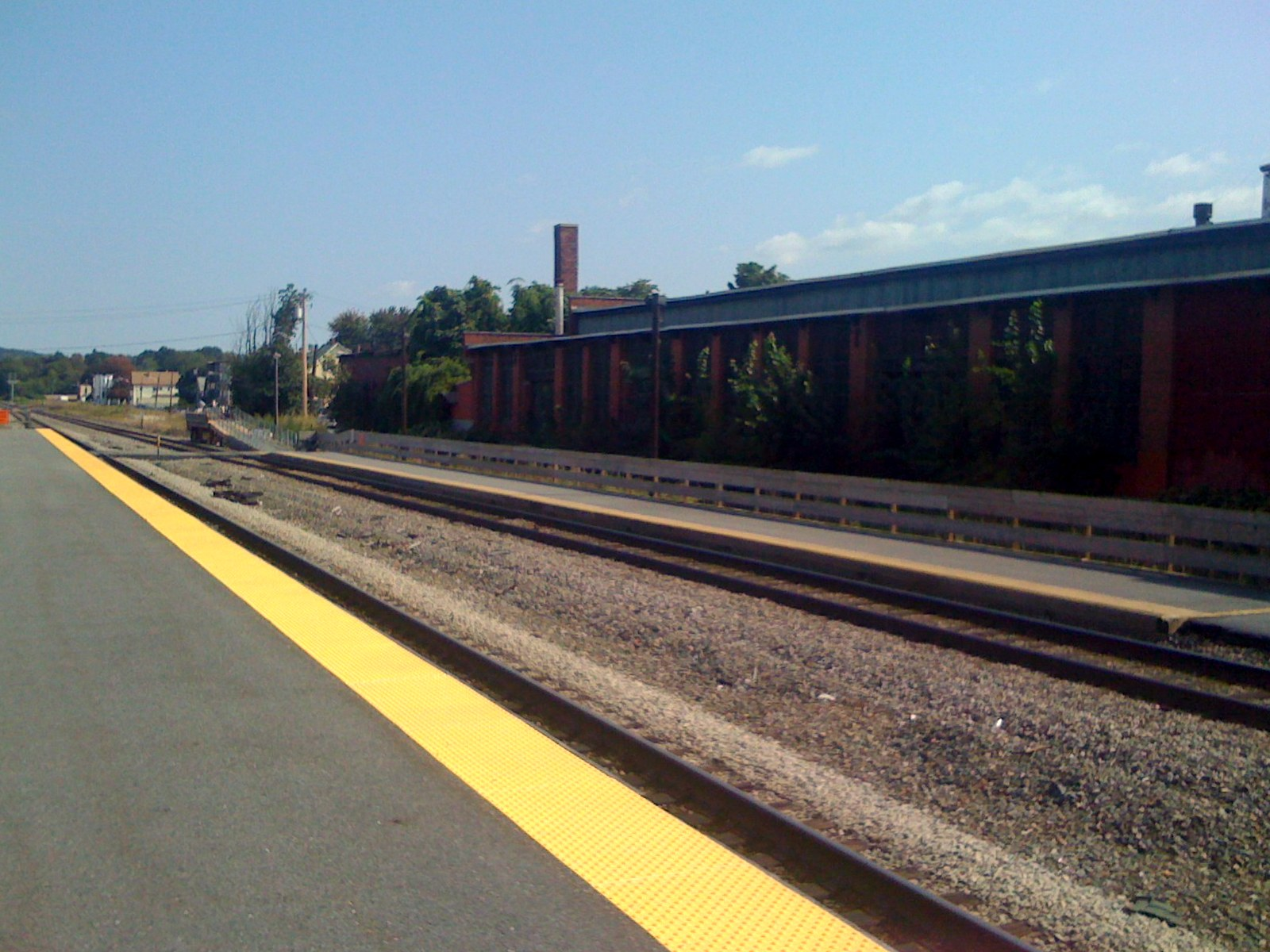
Main platform (left) and temporary platform (right) in 2008

On December 6, 2005, the Senator Patricia McGovern Transportation Center opened with a new Lawrence train station a quarter mile to the east, replacing the former station. The old platform is still extant.

Service to the station is at a single full-length high-level platform on the north side of the tracks. After the station was built in 2005, there was also a temporary platform located on the south side of the tracks, but locals were unhappy with having to cross active tracks to reach the garage from the platform. The second platform was removed from service after several years and was demolished when Pan Am built a second freight track through the station around 2010. With freight trains now on their dedicated tracks, the single passenger track is sufficient for current service levels. A similar platform was built in 2014 for use during track work on the line.

On September 1, 2024, MeVa moved its Lawrence hub to McGovern Transportation Center, replacing Buckley Transportation Center in downtown Lawrence.
