= Haverhill Line =

MBTA Commuter Rail line

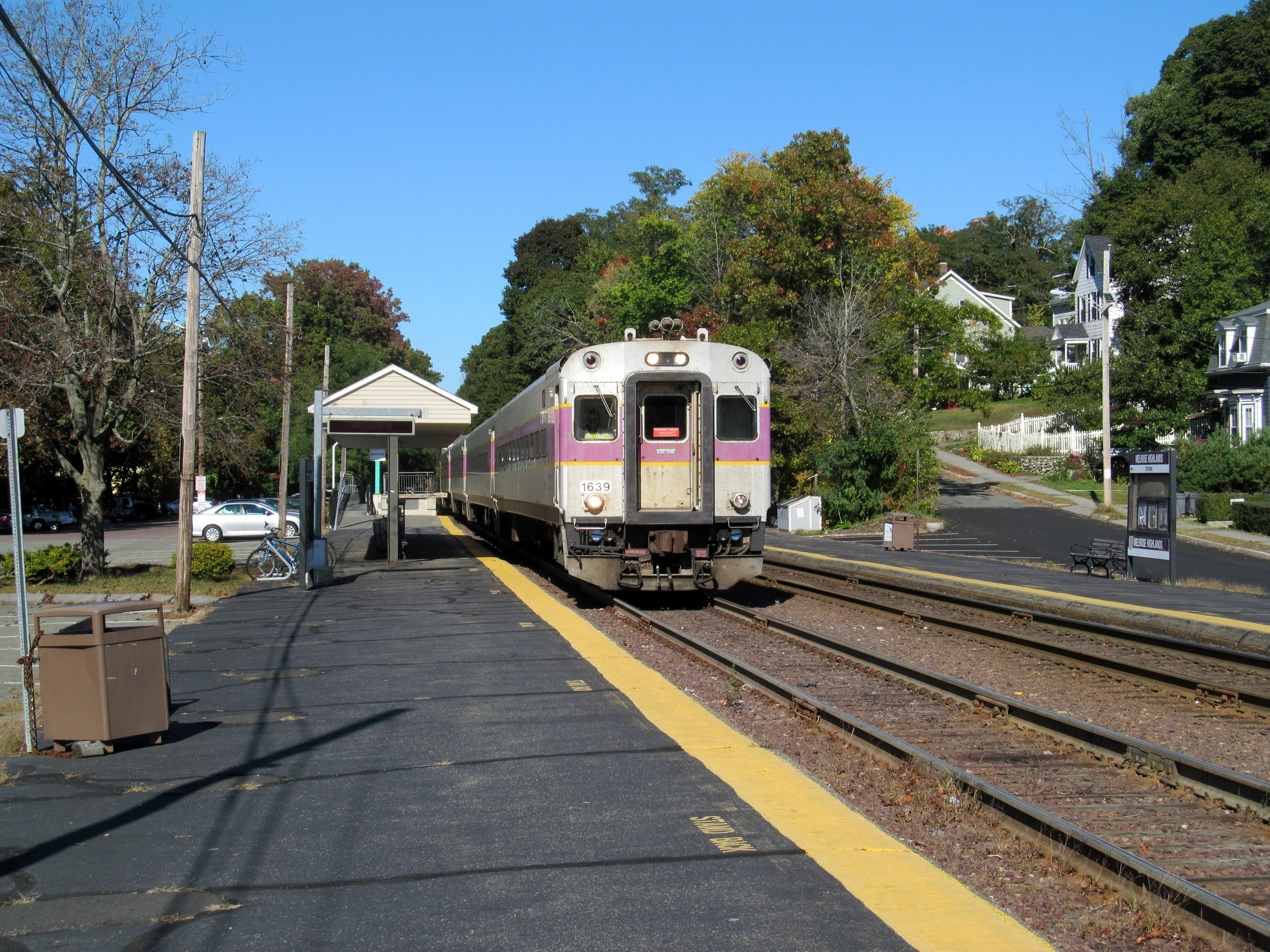
- An inbound train at Melrose Highlands station in 2014

Overview
- Owner: Massachusetts Bay Transportation Authority
- Locale: Northeastern Massachusetts
- Termini: Haverhill; North Station
- Stations: 15

Service
- Type: Commuter rail
- System: MBTA Commuter Rail
- Train number(s): 2001-2028, 2301-2319 (weekdays); 2501-2516 (weekends)
- Operator: Keolis North America
- Daily ridership: 3,856 (2024)

Technical
- Line length: 33 miles (53 km)
- Track gauge: 4 ft 8 1/2 in (1,435 mm) standard gauge

The Haverhill Line (formerly the Haverhill/Reading Line) is a branch of the MBTA Commuter Rail system, running north from downtown Boston, Massachusetts to Haverhill. The service operates on the Western Route of the former Boston and Maine Railroad, which extends north to Portland, Maine, though MBTA commuter rail service has not continued north of Massachusetts since 1967.

== History ==
=== Early cutbacks ===
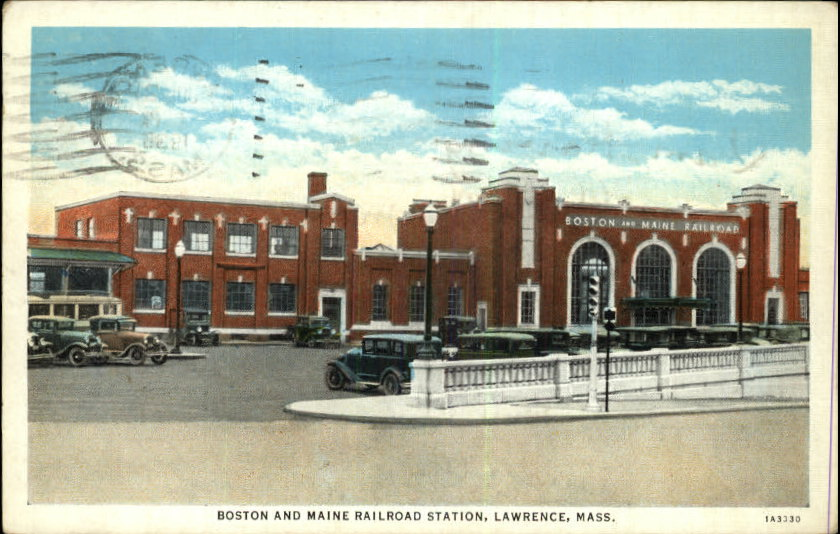
1931-built Lawrence station, used until 2005

Until 1959, the Boston and Maine Railroad (B&M) operated commuter service along its Western Route from Haverhill and Reading to Boston. In 1959 the section from Reading to Wilmington Junction became freight-only, and Haverhill commuter trains as well as intercity service from New Hampshire and Maine were rerouted over the Wildcat Branch and the lower Lowell Line. Salem Street on the Wildcat Branch opened to replace North Wilmington on the mainline. The MBTA was formed in August 1964 to consolidate and fund Boston's transit system, including subsidies for suburban commuter service. In December 1964, the MBTA signed a contract to subsidize B&M commuter service within the MBTA funding district. The portion of the Western Route north of Reading was outside the district.

On January 4, 1965, the B&M discontinued most interstate service. The only service north of Haverhill was a single Boston–Dover round trip. On January 18, 1965, the B&M discontinued almost all remaining intrastate service outside the MBTA district, including Boston–Haverhill service. This left only the Dover round trip serving the Western Route north of Reading. The Wakefield Junction stop on the Reading Line was discontinued at that time. The Dover trip was cut to Haverhill on June 30, 1967, with the municipalities outside the district (Haverhill, North Andover, Lawrence, and Andover) subsidizing the train. The Salem Street stop was discontinued.

In September 1973, the MBTA purchased the Western Route between Somerville and Wilmington Junction, with the intent to replace all Reading Line service with the Haymarket North Extension of the rapid transit Orange Line. However, local opposition to the extension - largely in Melrose, where rapid transit conversion would have required the elimination of grade crossings, possibly blocking important east-west local roads - and funding issues meant that the Orange Line only reached Oak Grove. A single track was retained for Reading Line service to Melrose, Wakefield, and Reading. Pearl Street station in Malden closed on December 27, 1975 concurrent with the opening of the Orange Line's Malden Center station; a commuter platform at Malden Center - the first high-level platform on the commuter system - opened on May 1, 1977 but closed again in September 1979.

In November 1974, North Andover and Andover declined to renew their subsidies. Service to North Andover station ended on November 15. Days before, Andover commuters and businesses raised funds to continue service until April 1975. On April 7, 1975, town residents voted "overwhelmingly" to reimburse the commuters and subsidize service for an additional year. The town declined to subsidize further service, and the three Andover stops (Shawsheen, Andover, and Ballardvale) were dropped effective April 2, 1976. The round trip, by then stopping just at Lawrence, Bradford and Haverhill, last ran on June 30, 1976. The MBTA bought all B&M commuter equipment and lines on December 27, 1976, including the Western Route from Wilmington Junction to the New Hampshire border.

=== Restoration ===
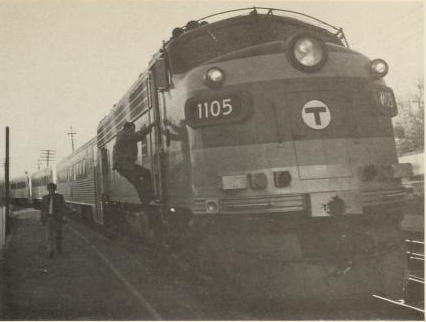
A train at Bradford shortly after the resumption of service

After the passenger cutbacks, the upper Western Route remained in use by freight. Planning began in 1978 for restoration of Haverhill service using the Merrimack Valley Regional Transit Authority as a funding intermediary. Weekday service was restored to Haverhill via Reading on December 17, 1979. Station stops resumed at North Wilmington, Ballardvale, Andover, Shawsheen, Lawrence, Bradford, and Haverhill, but not North Andover. Weekend service to Haverhill began on April 27, 1980, while Shawsheen station was closed. A small amount of Haverhill service was rerouted over the Wildcat Branch beginning in May 1981, skipping North Wilmington.

On January 20, 1984, a fire destroyed the wooden trestles approaching the North Station drawbridges. Haverhill/Reading Line trains ran to the normally-unused platform at Oak Grove for transfer to the Orange Line during the disruption. Oak Grove was discontinued as a regular stop when North Station and the drawbridges reopened on April 20, 1985, but the platform at Malden Center was permanently reopened for transfer purposes. The switch may have been made due to a request by John A. Brennan Jr., who was then constructing a large development near Malden Center station.

A 1990–1991 project rebuilt the Medford Branch overpass north of Wellington to allow newer F40PH locomotives on the line. Daily ridership on the line increased from 2,955 in 1991 to 4,970 in 2001. On December 14, 2001, Amtrak's Downeaster service began operating from Boston to Portland, Maine. The Downeaster runs via the lower Lowell Line and the Wildcat Branch then the Western Route, with a stop at Haverhill. On December 5, 2005, the new McGovern Transportation Center replaced the old Lawrence station.

=== 2010s improvement projects ===
==== Double tracking ====
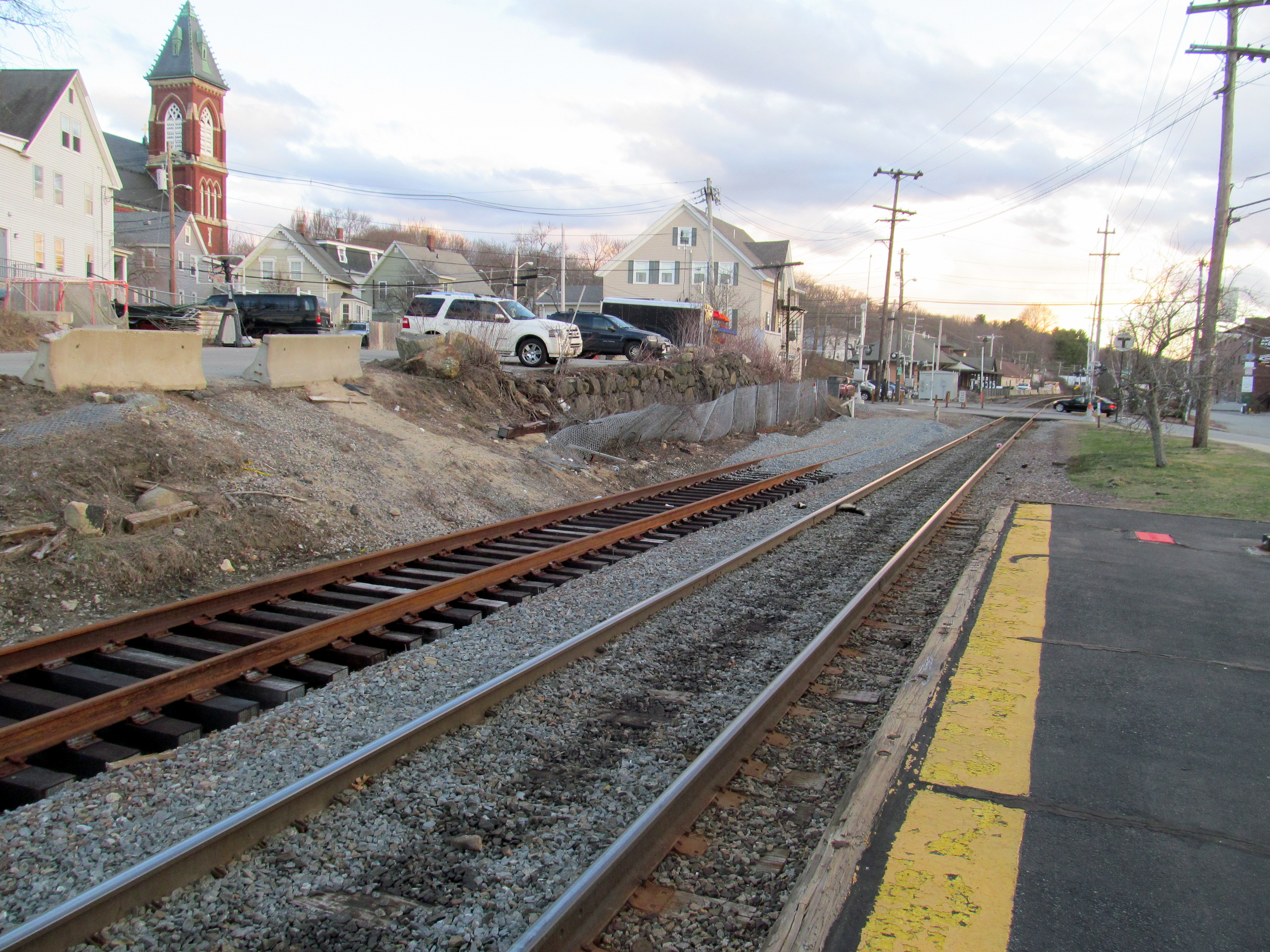
Double track being installed in Andover in 2016

Due to the Reading line being single-tracked along the Orange Line corridor in the 1970s, and most double track removed north of Wilmington after the 1976 discontinuation, the Haverhill Line has the most single track on the MBTA system. In early 2009, the MBTA began planning the addition of double track between Reading and Ballardvale that summer. Those plans fell through, but later that year the MBTA was awarded $51.5 million of stimulus funding for a variety of projects, including $10.2 million for the addition of double track from one mile north of Ballardvale to Andover Street in Lawrence, as well as $7.2 million for signal upgrades. The double tracking will increase capacity on the section of the line shared with freight service, increasing reliability and allowing for possible travel time decreases for the Downeaster. The second track was not extended through Ballardvale station due to limited space for a second platform, but Andover station was to receive a second platform and possibly additional parking following the removal of a town vehicle yard.

Work started in April 2010; a groundbreaking was held in May 2010 with completion then estimated for February 2012. Due to funding issues and construction delays, the work was not finished in 2012. By late 2013, a 1,300 feet (400 m) stone wall at Andover station had been replaced, along with a century-old culvert, as part of drainage improvements. Construction of the track and crossovers was partially complete; the signal system was largely finished. After more delays, the project was completed around 2017. However, second platforms were not built at Andover and Ballardvale, limiting the usefulness of the second track for the MBTA. Instead, Pan Am Railways often uses the second track in Andover to idle freight trains.

In 2011, the Northern New England Passenger Rail Authority won a $20.8 million federal grant to add additional double track from Wilmington Junction to just south of Ballardvale station. This second section of double track is largely for use by Downeaster trains but may benefit MBTA trains using the Wildcat Branch as well. The $26.0 million project (including a $5.2 million match from the MBTA) included 14,100 feet of new double main, rebuilt interlockings at Wilmington Junction and Lowell Junction, a maintenance-of-way siding at Wilmington Junction, preparing three grade crossings on the Wildcat Branch for future double tracking, and replacement of 5 miles of old track between Lawrence and Bradford. Work began in 2012 and was completed around 2017.

==== Bridges ====
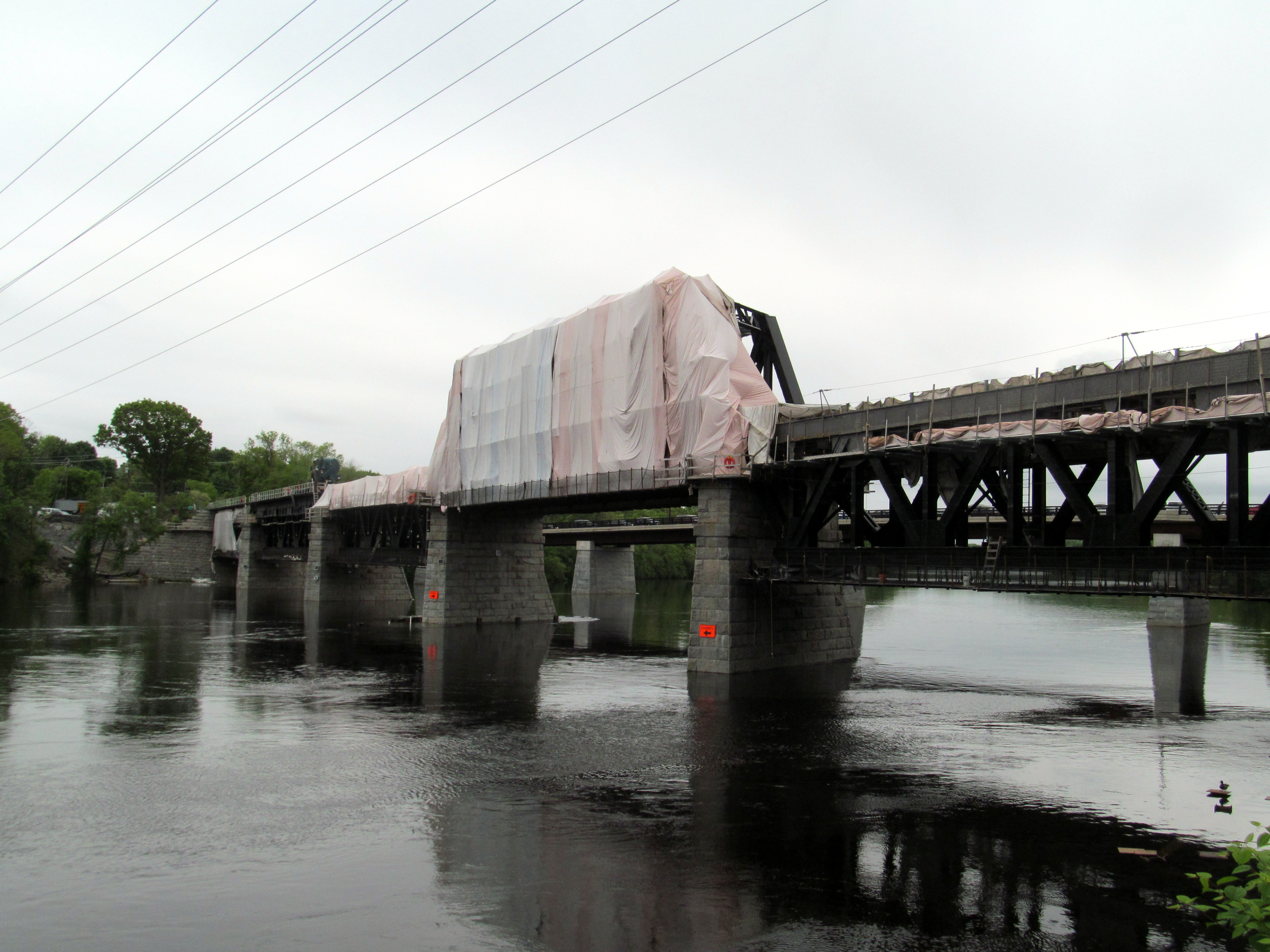
Merrimack River Bridge work in May 2017

Several bridges on the line were in poor condition, including the twelve-span, 1,042-foot (318 m)-long bridge over the Merrimack River between Bradford and Haverhill. A single-track covered bridge was built in 1839, and was replaced with a two-track steel truss bridge on the same piers in 1881. In 1904–05, the bridge was raised 11 feet (3.4 m) at the south end and 13 feet (4.0 m) at the north end as part of a grade crossing elimination project. A temporary one-track wooden trestle was constructed to the west of the bridge; the truss spans were jacked up 2 feet (0.61 m) at a time while the masonry piers were built up under them. The truss spans were replaced in 1919, again reusing the piers; the northern approach over Washington Street was replaced in 1928. In 2008, the MBTA began a $3 million project to repair the bridge. However, traffic on the bridge was still under heavy speed restrictions, with one freight train at 5 miles per hour (8.0 km/h) or two passenger trains at 15 miles per hour (24 km/h) allowed.

In 2010, the state applied for $110.8 million in federal funding to replace the bridge, but the request was denied in May 2011. In December 2011, the state received $10 million in TIGER stimulus funds to aid in rehabilitation of the bridge, then to cost $43 million. Passenger train speeds would be increased to 40–60 miles per hour (64–97 km/h), while freight speeds will be increased to 30 miles per hour (48 km/h) and maximum car loading increased to the 286,000-pound (130,000 kg) standard. The MBTA awarded a $23.9 million contract for the first phase in early 2014, with construction expected to last from April 2014 to April 2017. By 2014, the total cost was expected to reach $100 million. Some off-peak trains were substituted with buses during the repairs, and service was suspended on six weekends between September 2014 and November 2016. The second phase of bridge reconstruction - repairs to the piers - lasted from 2016 to 2019. Additional scour protection work was completed in 2021.

Repairs were also made to two smaller arch bridges over the Shawsheen River in Andover, both dating to the line's opening in 1839. The historic bridges were no longer able to support modern train loads; instead, fill was removed from the arch and modern flat steel bridges placed inside them. The steel bridges carry the train loads so that the stone arches need merely support their own weight. The $10.9 million project began in September 2012, with substantial completion in September 2013 and full completion a year later.

=== Plaistow extension proposal and layovers ===
Prior to 1987, when the system was operated by B&M successor Guilford Transportation Industries, trains were stored overnight on Guilford-owned sidings north of Haverhill station in a largely industrial area. When the MBTA contracted with Amtrak in 1987 to operate the system, a new layover yard for the line was needed. The MBTA constructed a two-track layover yard adjacent to a rebuilt Bradford station at a cost of $2.2 million. It was built without an environmental evaluation process in violation of state law; not until 1992 did complaints from residents prompt the MBTA to belatedly start the process. Because of its proximity to the Bradford residential neighborhood, the noise and diesel fumes from the layover have prompted continued complaint from residents.

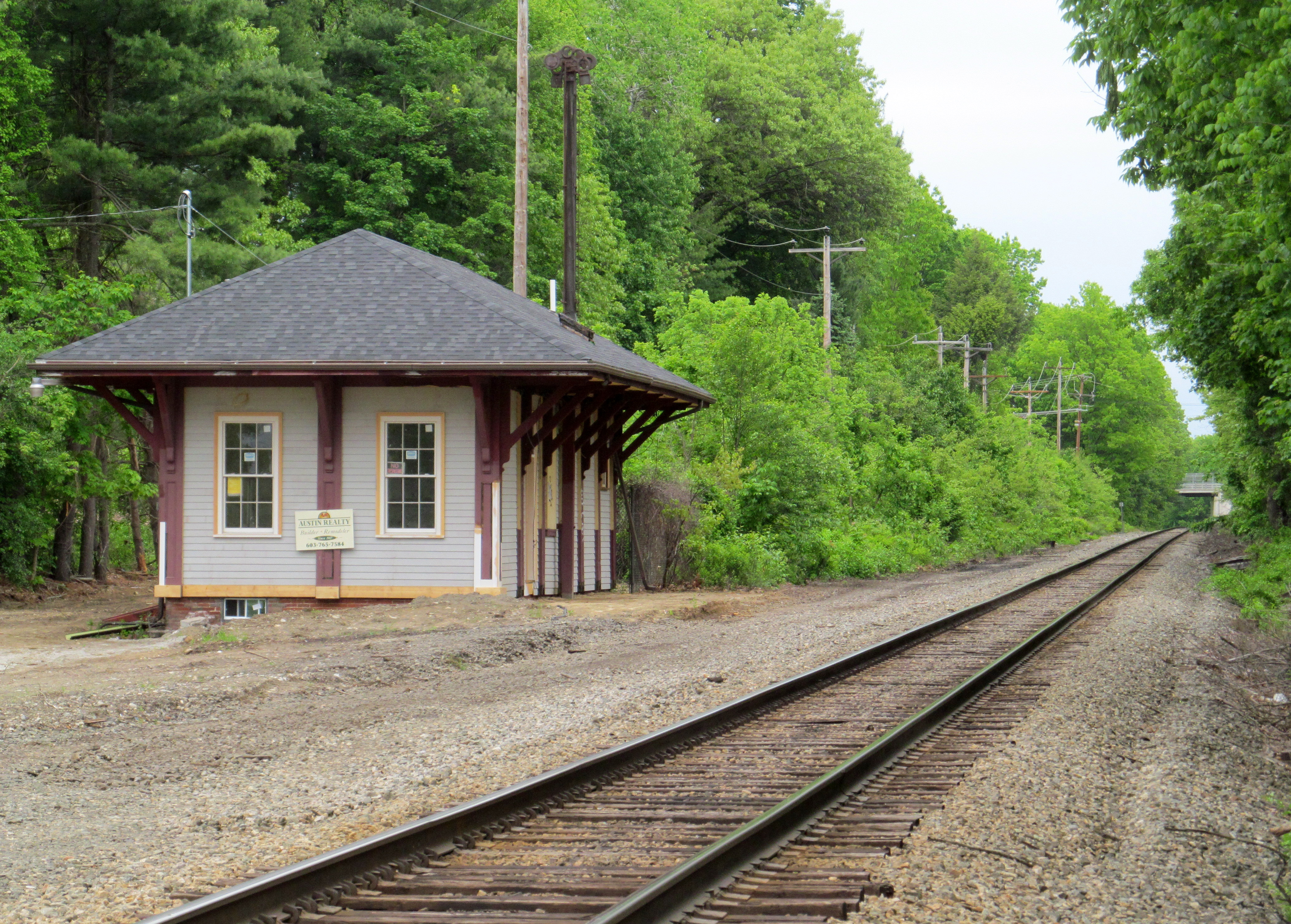
The former Plaistow station, which last had passenger service in 1967

In 2008, Massachusetts entered negotiations to buy property in Plaistow, New Hampshire for a layover yard (to replace the undersized Bradford layover) and a new station. Funding was available, and Plaistow was potentially interested, but wanted to better understand the potential drawbacks of being the location of the layover station. By August 2010, both states said that they were close to reaching a deal that would allow trains to operate over the proposed expansion.

Plaistow residents voted down one extension possibility in 2012, but the extension remained on the table. In August 2013, the New Hampshire Department of Transportation began another study of layover and station sites. A number of station and layover site options were presented in May 2014, and three final options were released in September 2014: a station and layover just past NH-125, a station there with the layover moved just south of the state line, and a station and layover near NH-121A. However, the Plaistow Board of Selectmen voted for the "no build" option to not extend commuter rail to the town in April 2015.

As of 2022, the MBTA plans to relocate and expand the layover facility in the mid-to-late 2020s.

=== Recent changes ===
The line was shut down on weekends in September through December 2017 for the installation of Positive Train Control equipment in order to meet a 2020 federal deadline. Substantially reduced schedules due to the COVID-19 pandemic were in effect from March 16 to June 23, 2020, and from December 14, 2020, to April 5, 2021. On January 23, 2021, reduced schedules went into place with no weekend service on seven lines, including the Haverhill Line. Weekend service on the seven lines resumed on July 3, 2021.

Continuous welded rail was installed on an 11.5-mile (18.5 km) section between Fells Interlocking in Malden and the Ipswich River in Wilmington from September to November 2021. Most off-peak service between Reading and North Station was cancelled, with many Haverhill trains operating using the Wildcat Branch. A second track and platform at Ballardvale is planned.

As of February 2022, the line has 13 Boston–Haverhill round trips and 9 1/2 Boston–Reading round trips on weekdays, with two inbound and one outbound Haverhill train using the Wildcat Branch. Weekend service has eight Boston–Haverhill round trips. During the closure of the Orange Line from August 19 to September 18, 2022, all Haverhill Line trains stopped at Oak Grove. It was retained as a permanent Haverhill Line stop after the closure. By October 2022, the line had 5,806 daily riders; this represented 82% of pre-COVID ridership, the second-highest percentage on the system.

All service between Reading and Boston was replaced by buses from September 10 to November 5, 2023 during installation of automatic train control and positive train control systems. Service on the outer section of the line operated via the Wildcat Branch and the inner Lowell Line, while North Wilmington station was closed. From May 20 to September 29, 2024, weekday midday inbound trains were temporarily routed over the Wildcat Branch during rail replacement work. In 2024, the town of North Andover began a planning study for a potential infill station at the Osgood Landing development. Replacement of the South Elm Street bridge in Bradford caused Haverhill station to be closed for MBTA service from July 15, 2024, to June 30, 2025. Bradford station was the temporary terminal of the line during the closure.

In June 2022, the MBTA indicated plans to add a second track at Reading station by 2023, allowing 30-minute headways between Boston and Reading. Hourly service to Haverhill was also being studied. In November 2024, the MBTA submitted a notice of intent (NOI) for the track construction. It would extend 4,500 feet (1,400 m) northwest from the station, effectively restoring the double track that formerly existed. Reading short turn trains would lay over on the new track rather than at the single-track station. As previously planned, it would allow 30-minute headways between Boston and Reading, with 60-minute headways for Haverhill service. The MBTA withdrew the NOI in February 2025, but resubmitted it in September 2025 with several changes including screen trees. The MBTA again withdrew the plan in November 2025.

In August 2026, the MBTA received a $139.6 million grant from the Federal Railroad Administration to add 6.5 miles (10.5 km) of double track between Reading and Wilmington Junction, plus 0.3 miles (0.5 km) at Ballardvale. The project will include reconstruction of Reading, North Wilmington, Ballardvale, and Andover stations with short, accessible high platforms. The work is intended to allow 30-minute headways between Boston and Haverhill pending equipment availability. Construction is expected to last from 2028 to 2030.

== Station listing ==
Mileages to the New Hampshire stations are via the Wildcat Branch and Wilmington – 0.4 miles (0.64 km) longer than the mainline through Reading – which was the route used at the time of discontinuance.

State	Miles (km)	Fare zone	Location	Station	Connections and notes
MA	0.0 (0.0)	1A	Boston	North Station	Amtrak: Downeaster; MBTA Commuter Rail: Fitchburg, Lowell, and Newburyport/Rockport Lines; MBTA subway: Orange Line, Green Line (D and E branches); MBTA bus: 4 EZRide; MBTA ferry: F10; Seaport Ferry
MA	0.8 (1.3)	1A	Somerville	Boston Engine Terminal	Flag stop for MBTA employees only
MA	4.5 (7.2)	1A	Malden	Malden Center	MBTA subway Orange Line; MBTA bus: 97, 99, 101, 104, 105, 106, 108, 131, 132, 137, 411, 430
MA	5.0 (8.0)	1A	Malden	Oak Grove	MBTA subway: Orange Line; MBTA bus: 131, 132, 137
MA	6.2 (10.0)	1	Melrose	Wyoming Hill	MBTA bus: 131, 132, 137
MA	6.7 (10.8)	1	Melrose	Melrose/Cedar Park	
MA	7.5 (12.1)	1	Melrose	Melrose Highlands	MBTA bus: 131
MA	8.5 (13.7)	2	Wakefield	Greenwood	MBTA bus: 137
MA	9.4 (15.1)	2	Wakefield	Wakefield Junction	Closed on January 18, 1965
MA	9.9 (15.9)	2	Wakefield	Wakefield	MBTA bus: 137
MA	12.0 (19.3)	2	Reading	Reading	MBTA bus: 137
MA	16.3 (26.2)	3	Wilmington	North Wilmington	
MA	20.5 (33.0)	4	Andover	Ballardvale	
MA	22.8 (36.7)	5	Andover	Andover	MeVa: 21
MA	23.9 (38.5)		Andover	Shawsheen	Closed April 27, 1980
MA	26.0 (41.8)	6	Lawrence	Lawrence	MeVa: 0, 1, 2, 3, 4, 5, 6, 7, 8, 9, 10, 11, 12, 14, 24, 26, 28 Moved from location 0.4 miles (0.6 km) west in 2005
MA	26.9 (43.3)		North Andover	North Andover	Closed in November 1974
MA	32.5 (52.3)	7	Haverhill	Bradford	
MA	32.9 (52.9)	7	Haverhill	Haverhill	Amtrak: Downeaster; MeVa: 1, 13, 14, 15, 16, 17, 18
NH	36.4 (58.6)		Atkinson	Atkinson	Closed June 30, 1967
NH	38.3 (61.6)		Plaistow	Plaistow	Closed June 30, 1967
NH	40.7 (65.5)		Newton	Newton Junction	Closed June 30, 1967
NH	44.5 (71.6)		East Kingston	Powwow River	Closed June 30, 1967
NH	45.5 (73.2)		East Kingston	East Kingston	Closed June 30, 1967
NH	50.4 (81.1)		Exeter	Exeter	Closed June 30, 1967; Served by Amtrak Downeaster service since 2001
NH	54.4 (87.5)		Newfields	Newfields	Closed June 30, 1967
NH	57.2 (92.1)		Newmarket	Newmarket	Closed June 30, 1967
NH	61.7 (99.3)		Durham	Durham	Closed June 30, 1967; Served by Amtrak Downeaster service since 2001
NH	67.1 (108.0)		Dover	Dover	Closed June 30, 1967; Served by Amtrak Downeaster service since 2001
Closed station
