= Exeter station (New Hampshire) =

Amtrak station in NH

Exeter, NH
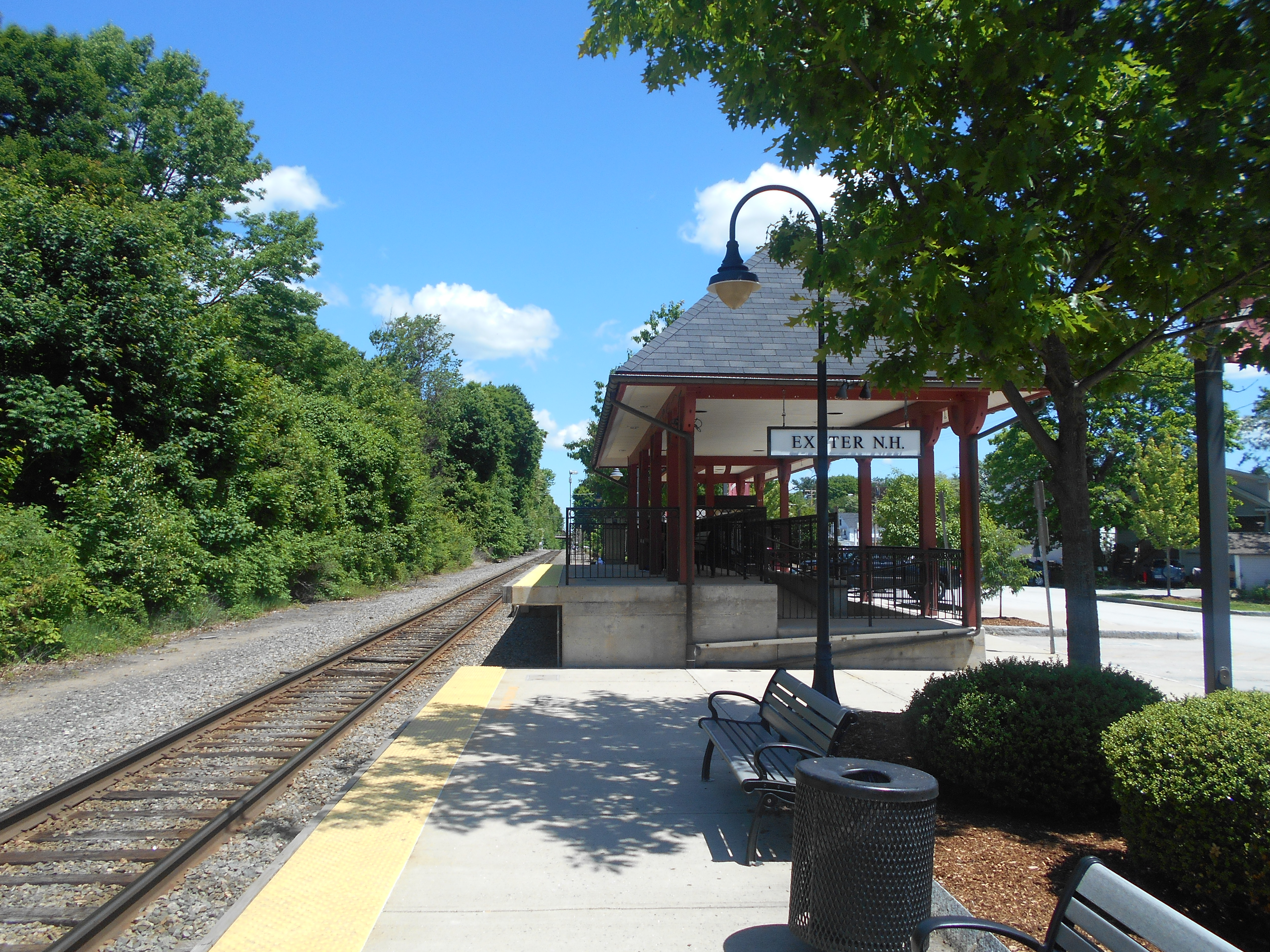
- Exeter station in July 2014

General information
- Location: 60 Lincoln Street; Exeter, New Hampshire; United States
- Coordinates: 42°58′52″N 70°57′31″W
- Owner: Town of Exeter (station); New Hampshire Department of Transportation (platform); CSX Transportation (track)
- Line: PAR Freight Main Line (Western Route)
- Platforms: 1 side platform
- Tracks: 1

Construction
- Parking: Yes
- Accessible: Yes

Other information
- Station code: Amtrak: EXR

History
- Opened: December 15, 2001

Passengers
- FY 2025: 69,062 (Amtrak)

Services
Preceding station	Amtrak	Following station
Haverhill toward Boston North	Downeaster	Durham–UNH toward Brunswick
Former services (at B&M station)
Preceding station	Boston and Maine Railroad	Following station
East Kingston toward Boston	Western Route	Newfields toward Portland
East Kingston toward Boston	Boston – Dover until 1967	Newfields toward Dover
Location

Exeter station is an Amtrak train station located in Exeter, New Hampshire. The station has one low side platform with an accessible high section serving the single track of the Pan Am Railways Freight Main Line. On average, 230 passengers board or detrain daily, making it the busiest stop in New Hampshire.

The station opened on December 15, 2001 when Downeaster service began. The former Boston and Maine Railroad station, built in 1891 and used until 1967, is located nearby.
