= Bradford station =

Train station in Bradford, Massachusetts, US

Bradford
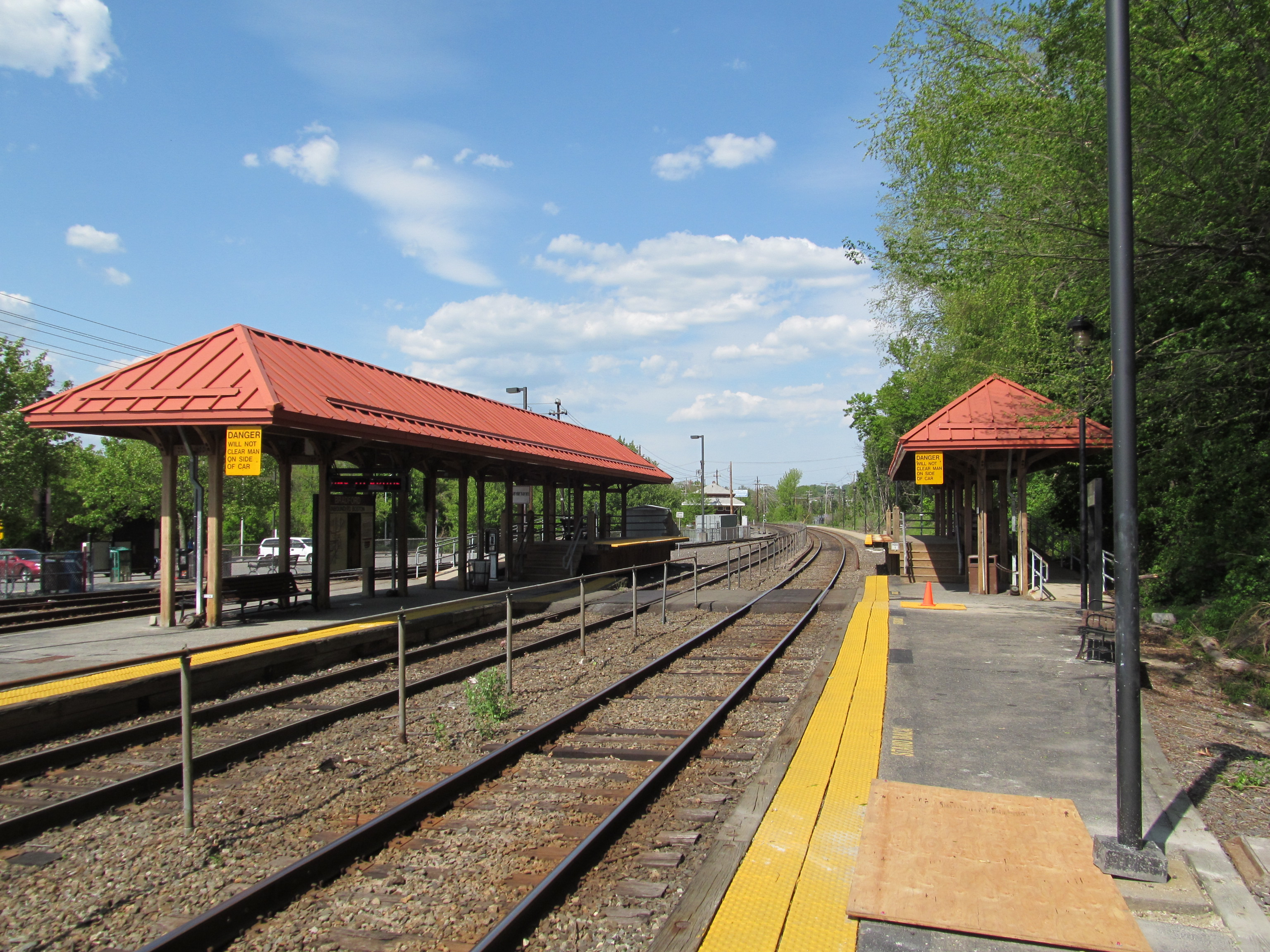
- Bradford station platforms in May 2012

General information
- Location: 10 Railroad Avenue; Bradford, Haverhill, Massachusetts
- Coordinates: 42°46′01″N 71°05′18″W
- Line: Western Route
- Platforms: 2 side platforms
- Tracks: 2

Construction
- Parking: 303 spaces ($2.00 fee)
- Cycle facilities: 12 spaces
- Accessible: Yes

Other information
- Fare zone: 7

Passengers
- 2024: 294 daily boardings

Services
Preceding station	MBTA	Following station
Lawrence toward North Station	Haverhill Line	Haverhill Terminus
Location

Bradford station is an MBTA Commuter Rail station in the Bradford neighborhood of Haverhill, Massachusetts, served by the Haverhill Line. The Haverhill Line's layover yard is located adjacent to the station.

== History ==
=== Boston and Maine Railroad ===
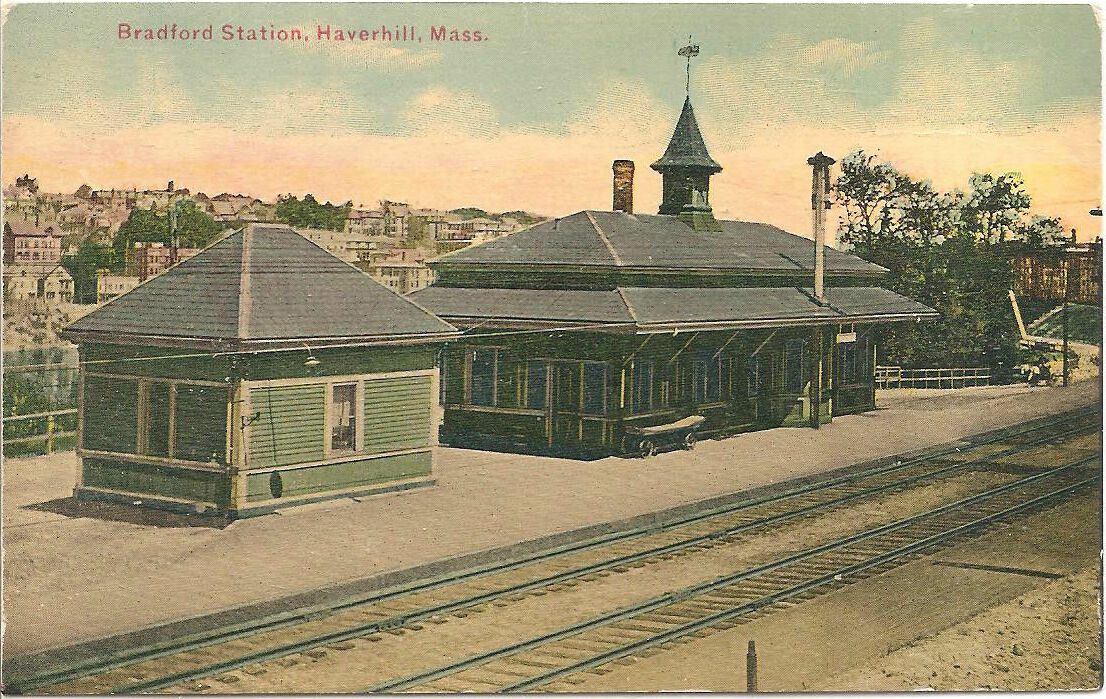
A postcard of the former Bradford station building, which is still extant

The Boston and Portland Railroad opened to Bradford (at the time, a separate town), across the Merrimack River from Haverhill, on October 26, 1837. It was the terminus of the line until the January 1, 1840 extension across the river and into New Hampshire. The Boston and Portland became the Boston and Maine Railroad (B&M) in 1843.

The Newburyport Railroad opened its Haverhill Branch between Georgetown and Bradford on September 22, 1851, with regular service beginning the next month. The B&M obtained control of the Newburyport in 1855 and leased it in 1860. The B&M built a new depot building in the 1870s, likely as part of a double-tracking project. It was raised 8 feet (2.4 m) in 1904–05 as part of a grade crossing elimination project.

Passenger service on the Haverhill Branch ended in 1933, though a short segment to a paper mill remained in freight use until 1982. The B&M sold the depot for commercial reuse in the 1960s. The Massachusetts Bay Transportation Authority (MBTA) was formed in 1964 to subsidize suburban commuter rail service. Haverhill was outside the MBTA district. On January 4, 1965, the B&M discontinued most interstate service. The only service north of Haverhill was a single Boston–Dover round trip. On January 18, 1965, the B&M discontinued almost all remaining intrastate service outside the MBTA district. This left only the Dover round trip serving Bradford. It was cut to Haverhill on June 30, 1967, with Lawrence and the other towns outside the district subsidizing the train.

=== MBTA ===
Bradford Layover in 2026

The single Haverhill round trip ended on June 30, 1976, due to a loss of state subsidies, ending service to Bradford. The MBTA purchased most of the B&M commuter assets, including the Western Route, on December 27, 1976. Planning began in 1978 for restoration of Haverhill service using the Merrimack Valley Regional Transit Authority as a funding intermediary. Haverhill Line service returned on December 17, 1979, including the resumption of the Lawrence stop. By 1993, the former station building housed a laundromat.

Prior to 1987, when the system was operated by B&M successor Guilford Transportation Industries, trains were stored overnight on Guilford-owned sidings north of Haverhill station in a largely industrial area. When the MBTA contracted with Amtrak in 1987 to operate the system, a new layover yard for the line was needed. The MBTA constructed a two-track layover yard adjacent to a rebuilt Bradford station at a cost of $2.2 million. It was built without an environmental evaluation process in violation of state law; not until 1992 did complaints from residents prompt the MBTA to belatedly start the process. Because of its proximity to the Bradford residential neighborhood, the noise and diesel fumes from the layover have prompted continued complaint from residents. Mini-high platforms for accessibility were added to the station around 1992.

As of 2022, the MBTA plans to relocate and expand the layover facility in the mid-to-late 2020s. Haverhill station was temporarily closed for MBTA service from July 15, 2024, to June 30, 2025, for replacement of the South Elm Street bridge in Bradford. Bradford station was the outer terminal of the line during that time.
