= Merrimack Valley Transit =

Regional public transportation system in Northeastern Massachusetts

Coordinates: 42°45′56″N 71°05′29.3″W

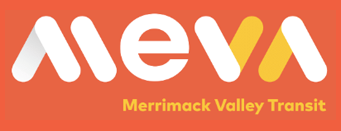

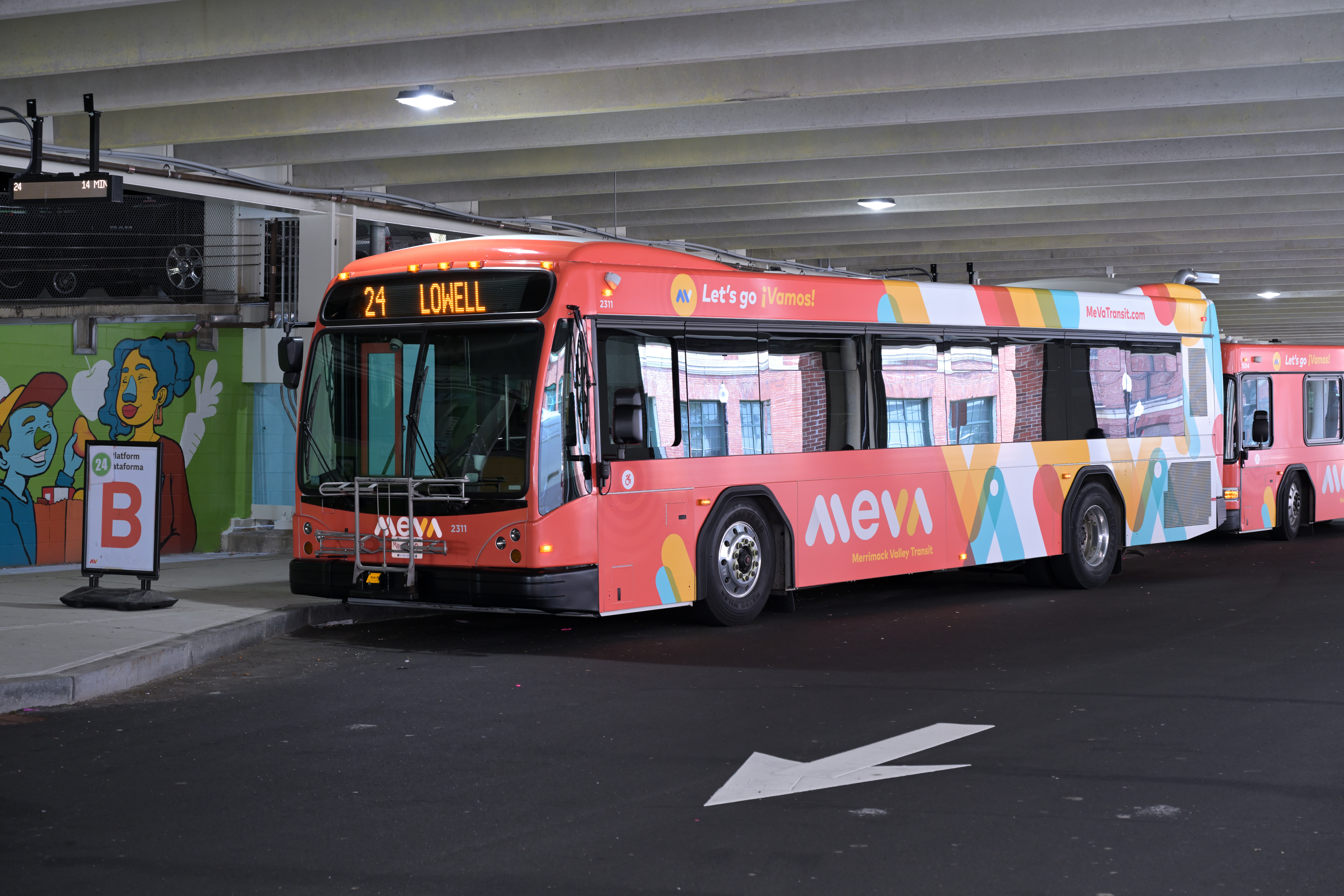
- MeVa buses at McGovern Transportation Center in 2025
- Headquarters: 85 Railroad Avenue; Haverhill, Massachusetts
- Service area: Northeast Massachusetts
- Service type: Bus service, paratransit
- Alliance: MBTA, LRTA
- Routes: 29
- Destinations: Lawrence, Haverhill, Methuen, Andover, North Andover, Lowell, Plaistow
- Fleet: Gillig
- Operator: First Transit
- Administrator: Noah Berger
- Website: mevatransit.com

Merrimack Valley Transit (MeVa), formerly known as Merrimack Valley Regional Transit Authority (MVRTA), is a transit agency in northeastern Massachusetts, United States. It provides public transportation to the municipalities of Amesbury, Andover, Boxford, Georgetown, Groveland, Haverhill, Lawrence, Merrimac, Methuen, Newbury, Newburyport, North Andover, Rowley, Salisbury and West Newbury, as well as a seasonal service to the popular nearby summer destination of Hampton Beach, New Hampshire.

== Operations ==
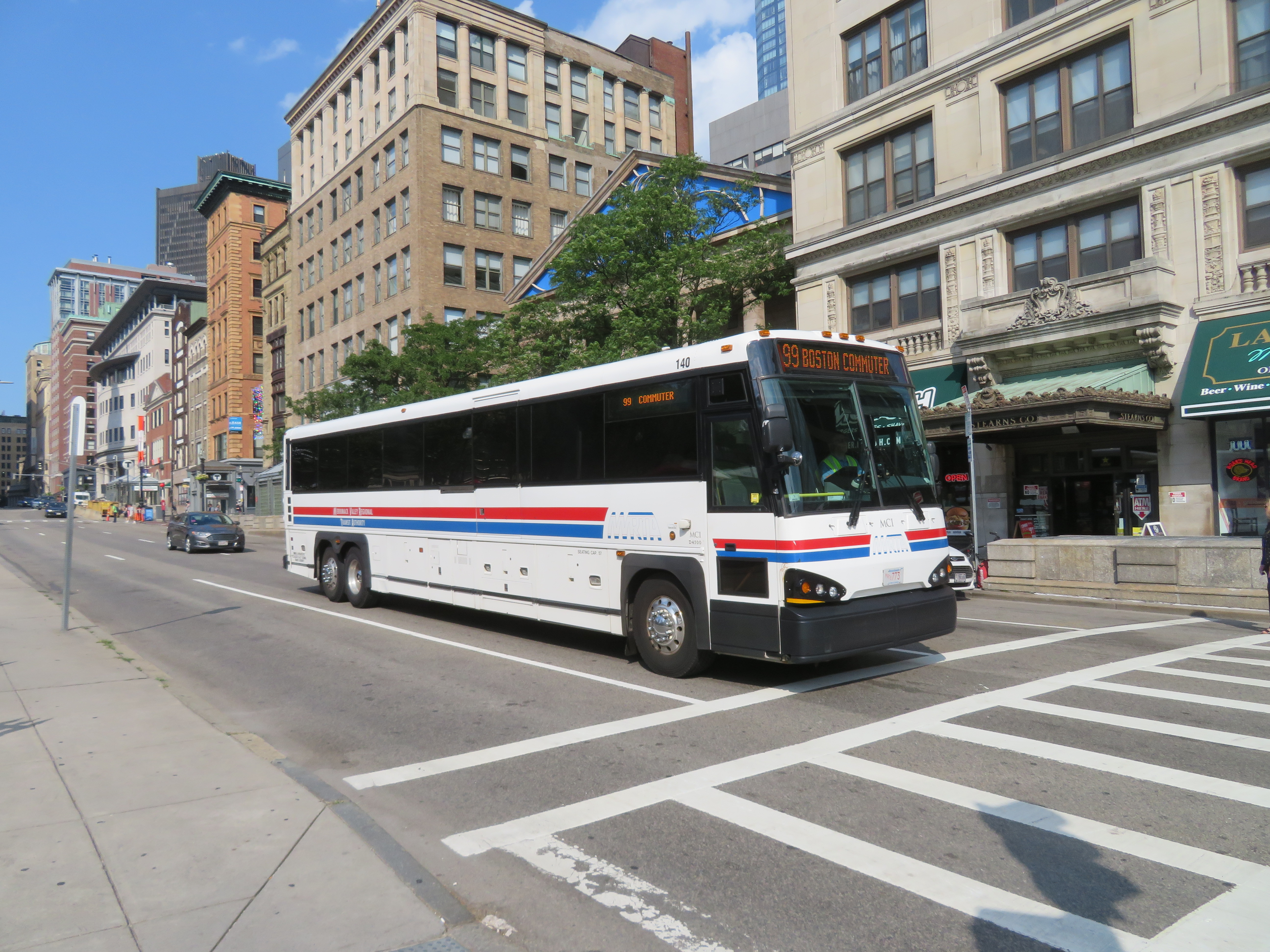
MVRTA commuter bus in Boston in 2019

MeVa provides fixed route bus services and paratransit services within its area, together with services to Lowell. MeVa routes connect with MBTA Commuter Rail at Andover, Haverhill, McGovern Transportation Center (Lawrence), Lowell, and Newburyport.

The MVRTA started operation in 1976. It was created under Chapter 161B of the Massachusetts General Laws. Since 1983, operation has been subcontracted to First Transit, a subsidiary of the United Kingdom based FirstGroup.

The MVRTA took over a Lawrence–Boston commuter route from a private operator, Trombly Commuter Lines, in January 2003. It was extended to Methuen that June. A North Andover–Boston round trip was added in April 2015. All Boston commuter service was suspended in March 2020 due to the COVID-19 pandemic. Methuen service resumed from July–August 2021 and September 2021 to September 2022, but has not operated since.

Effective March 1, 2022, all local routes are free. On September 1, 2024, MeVa moved its Lawrence hub from the 1993-opened downtown Buckley Transportation Center to McGovern Transportation Center.

As of November 2025, MeVA plans to begin limited ferry service between Haverhill, Amesbury, and Newburyport in 2026, with full service using three solar-powered ferries in 2027.

== Routes ==
MeVa operates 29 year-round routes in northeastern Massachusetts:

- 0 Essex Crosstown
- 1 Lawrence–Methuen–Haverhill
- 2 Andover
- 3 North Andover
- 4 Prospect Hill
- 5 Water Street
- 6 Holy Family Hospital/Lawrence Street
- 7 Beacon Street
- 8 Colonial Heights/North Andover Mall
- 9 North Andover Mall/Phillips Street
- 10 Methuen Square
- 11 Lawrence-Haverhill-Newburyport Limited
- 12 Lawrence Crosstown
- 13 Main Street/North Avenue
- 14 Lawrence-Haverhill via Amazon/Ward Hill
- 15 Hilldale Avenue/Haverhill Commons
- 16 Washington Street/Westgate Plaza
- 17 Haverhill–Salisbury Beach via Amesbury
- 18 Riverside/Groveland
- 19 Newburyport CR–Amesbury
- 20 Newburyport CR–Salisbury Beach
- 21 Andover Shuttle
- 22 Buttonwoods Express
- 24 Lawrence–Lowell
- 25 Methuen Crosstown
- 26 IRS/Raytheon
- 27 Beacon Street Special
- 28 Salem/Tuscan Village
- 30 Amesbury Circulator
