= Haverhill station (Massachusetts) =

Train station in Haverhill, Massachusetts

Haverhill
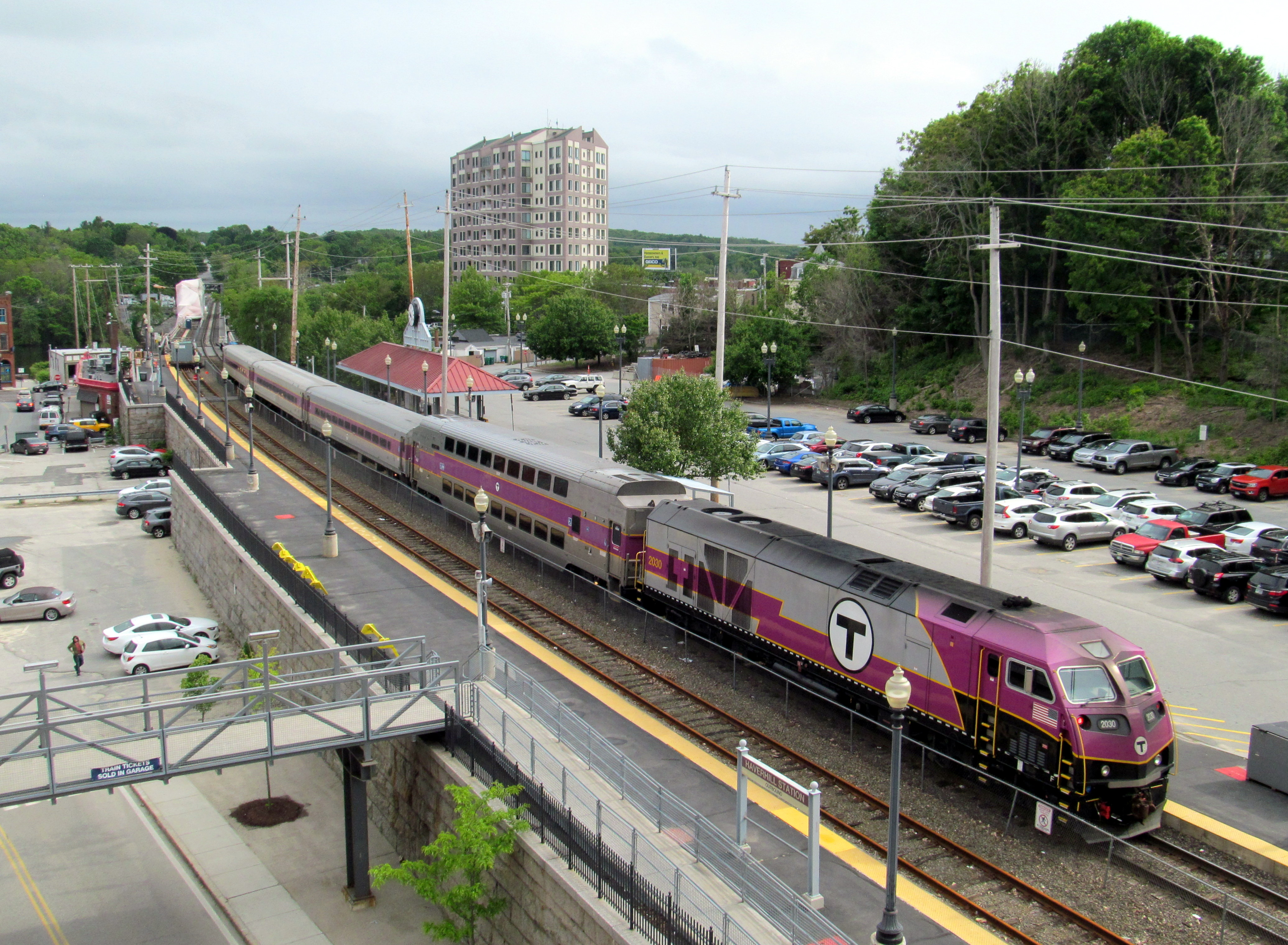
- An inbound MBTA train at Haverhill station in May 2017

General information
- Location: Washington Street (Routes 110/113) at Railroad Square; Haverhill, Massachusetts; United States
- Coordinates: 42.7735°N 71.0864°W
- Owner: Massachusetts Bay Transportation Authority
- Line: Western Route
- Platforms: 2 side platforms
- Tracks: 2
- Connections: MeVa: 1, 13, 14, 15, 16, 17, 18

Construction
- Parking: 159 spaces; paid
- Accessible: Yes

Other information
- Station code: Amtrak: HHL
- Fare zone: 7 (MBTA)

History
- Opened: December 17, 1979

Passengers
- FY 2025: 31,123 annually (Amtrak)
- 2018: 290 daily boardings (MBTA)

Services
Preceding station	Amtrak	Following station
Woburn toward Boston North	Downeaster	Exeter toward Brunswick
Preceding station	MBTA	Following station
Bradford toward North Station	Haverhill Line	Terminus
Former services
Preceding station	Boston and Maine Railroad	Following station
Bradford toward Boston	Western Route	Atkinson toward Portland
Bradford toward Boston	Boston – Dover until 1967	Atkinson toward Dover
Bradford toward Boston	Boston – Haverhill	Terminus
Location

Haverhill station is an intercity and regional rail station located in downtown Haverhill, Massachusetts, United States. It is served by Amtrak's Downeaster service and the MBTA Commuter Rail Haverhill/Reading Line; it is the northern terminus of MBTA service on the line. Haverhill is one of two major hubs for MeVa local bus service; the Washington Square Transit Center is located 1/5 mile (0.3 km) east of the rail station.

The Boston and Portland Railroad opened to Haverhill in 1840 and was renamed Boston and Maine Railroad (B&M) in 1843. The first station was replaced in 1867. It was modified with a second story in 1904–1906 during a project to eliminate grade crossings. B&M commuter service to Haverhill lasted until 1976; it resumed in 1979 under the control of the Massachusetts Bay Transportation Authority (MBTA). The Downeaster began service in 2001.

== History ==
=== Boston and Maine Railroad ===
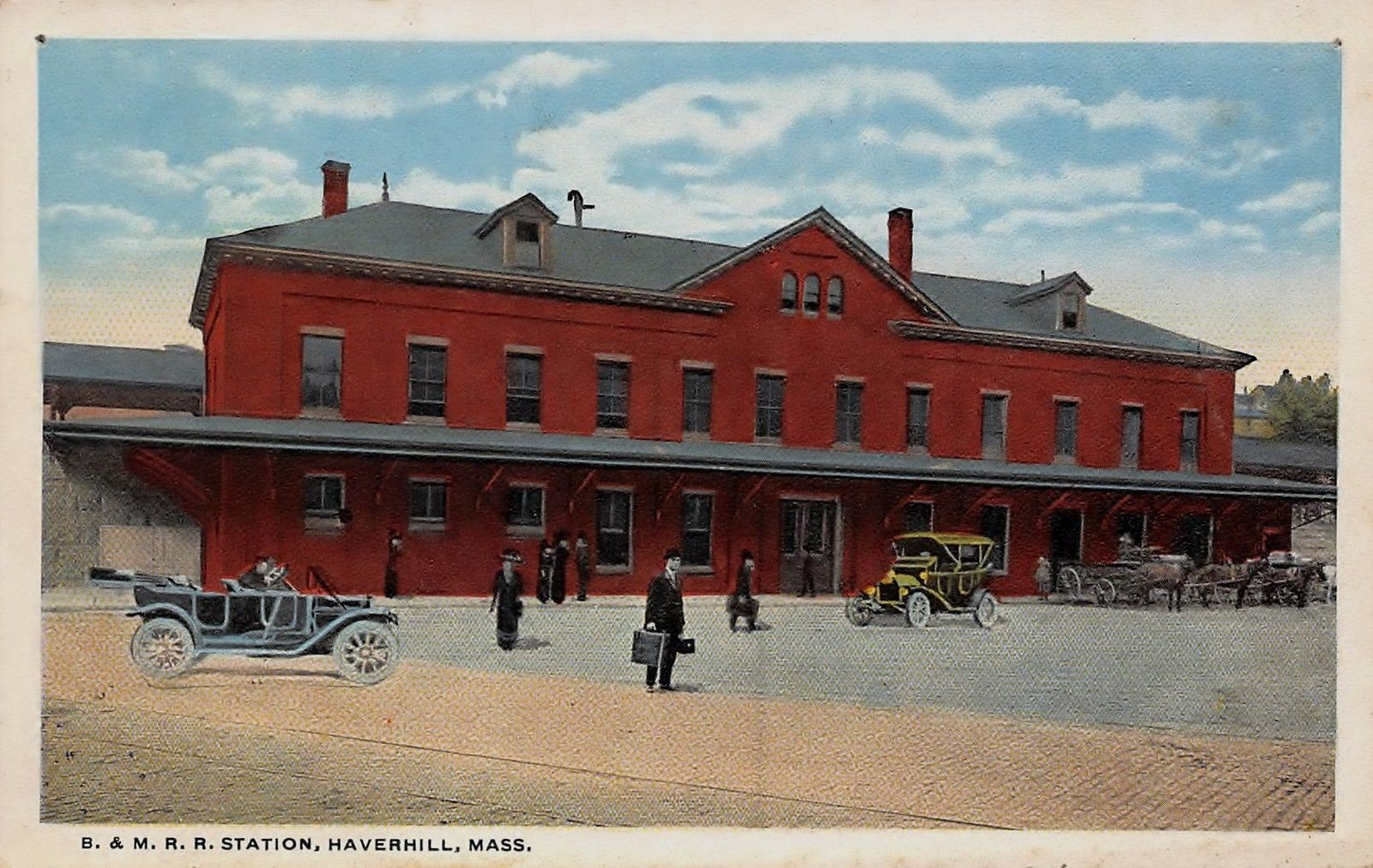
Haverhill station after the 1904–06 track raising

The Boston and Portland Railroad opened to Bradford, across the Merrimack River from Haverhill, on October 26, 1837. A bridge across the river was built in 1839, with service extended to East Kingston, New Hampshire via Haverhill on January 1, 1840. The railroad was renamed as the Boston and Maine Railroad (B&M) in 1843. The original station, with colonnades on several sides, was soon supplemented with a brick freight house. Haverhill had service suitable for commuting to Boston almost immediately; even after Dover became the outer limit for some commuter service in the 1850s, Haverhill remained the terminus of some trains.

A new brick station with a four-sided clock tower, design by local architect Josiah Littlefield, was built in 1867 on the east side of the tracks. A larger wooden freight house replaced the brick freight house several years later.

In the 1890s, the city began pushing for the elimination of grade crossings, including busy Washington Street adjacent to the station. A 1904–06 project eliminated crossings at Washington, Essex, Winter, and Elm streets by raising the railroad through Bradford and Haverhill. Although the city requested new station buildings on both sides of the tracks, the B&M instead added another story to the existing station and removed the clock tower. A pedestrian tunnel led to a waiting room on the west side of the tracks. The B&M used a temporary station at Essex Street while construction was in progress. The final cost of the project was $750,000 (equivalent to $20,200,000 in 2024). The existing freight house was not raised, while the former brick freight house was cut in half and moved away from the tracks for reuse. All three structures are still extant, though the newer freight house was partially destroyed by a fire.

=== MBTA and Amtrak ===
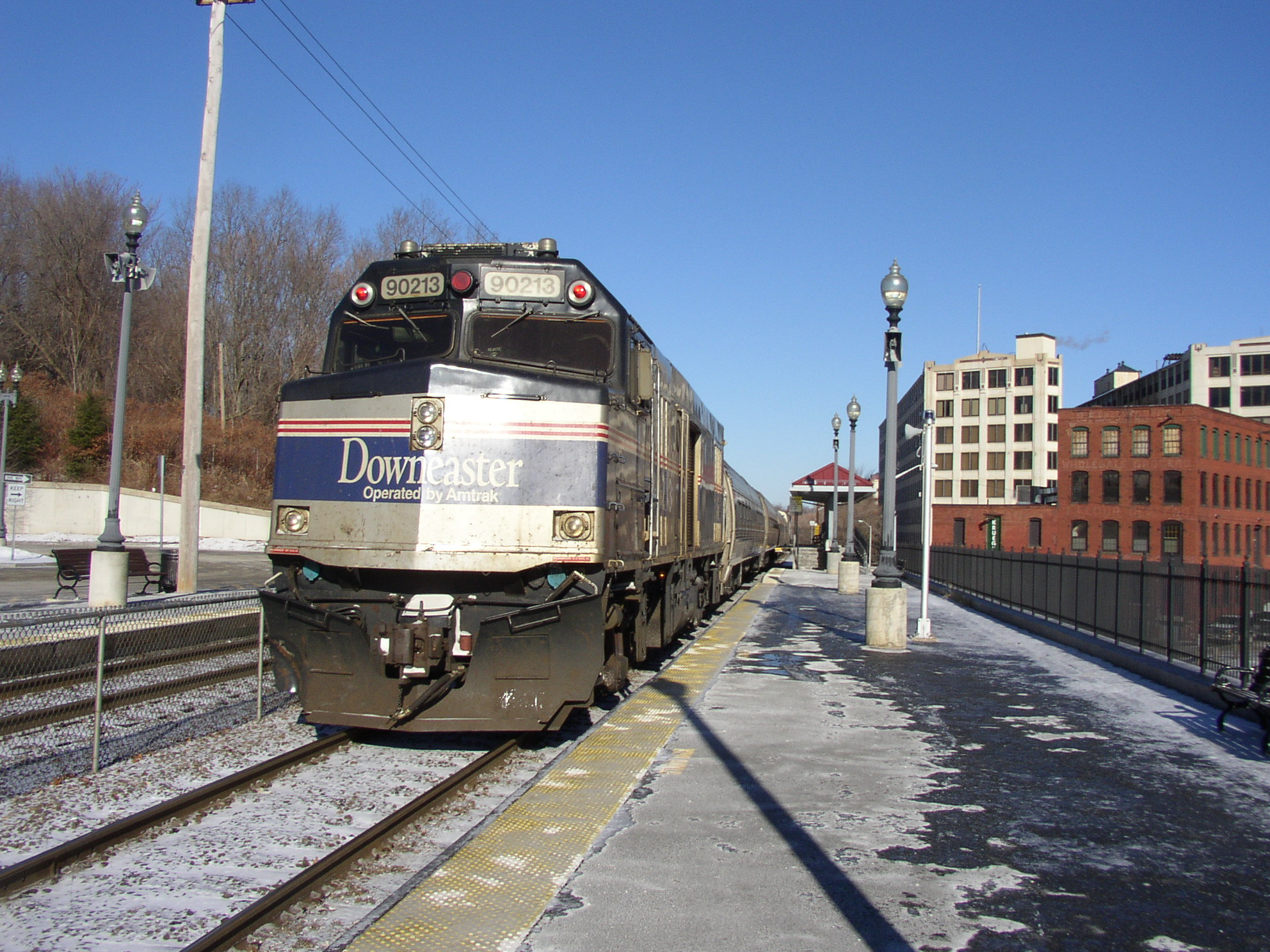
The Downeaster at Haverhill in 2006

The Massachusetts Bay Transportation Authority (MBTA) was formed in 1964 to subsidize suburban commuter rail service. Haverhill was outside the MBTA district. On January 4, 1965, the B&M discontinued most interstate service. Boston–Haverhill service continued, while the only service north of Haverhill was a single Boston–Dover round trip. On January 18, 1965, the B&M discontinued almost all remaining intrastate service outside the MBTA district, including the Boston–Haverhill trains. This left only the Dover round trip serving Haverhill. It was cut to Haverhill on June 30, 1967, with Haverhill and the other towns outside the district subsidizing the train.

North Andover stopped funding service in 1974, followed by Andover in 1976. The single Haverhill round trip ended on June 30, 1976, due to a loss of state subsidies, ending service to Lawrence. The MBTA purchased most of the B&M commuter assets, including the Western Route, on December 27, 1976. Planning began in 1978 for restoration of Haverhill service using the Merrimack Valley Regional Transit Authority as a funding intermediary. Haverhill Line service returned on December 17, 1979.

The other stations on the northern section of the Haverhill Line were modified for accessibility in the early 1990s; however, MBTA and town officials could not agree on the details of the Haverhill reconstruction. The MBTA opened bidding on the Haverhill station project - which included accessible mini-high platforms and a 160-space parking lot - in June 1998. The $4 million project was projected to take 18 months. The Downeaster began service, with a stop at the newly renovated Haverhill station, on December 14, 2001.

Haverhill station was temporarily closed for MBTA service from July 15, 2024, to June 30, 2025, for replacement of the South Elm Street bridge in Bradford. Bradford station was the outer terminal of the line during that time, though Amtrak service continued to serve Haverhill.
