= North Station =

Train station in Boston, Massachusetts, US

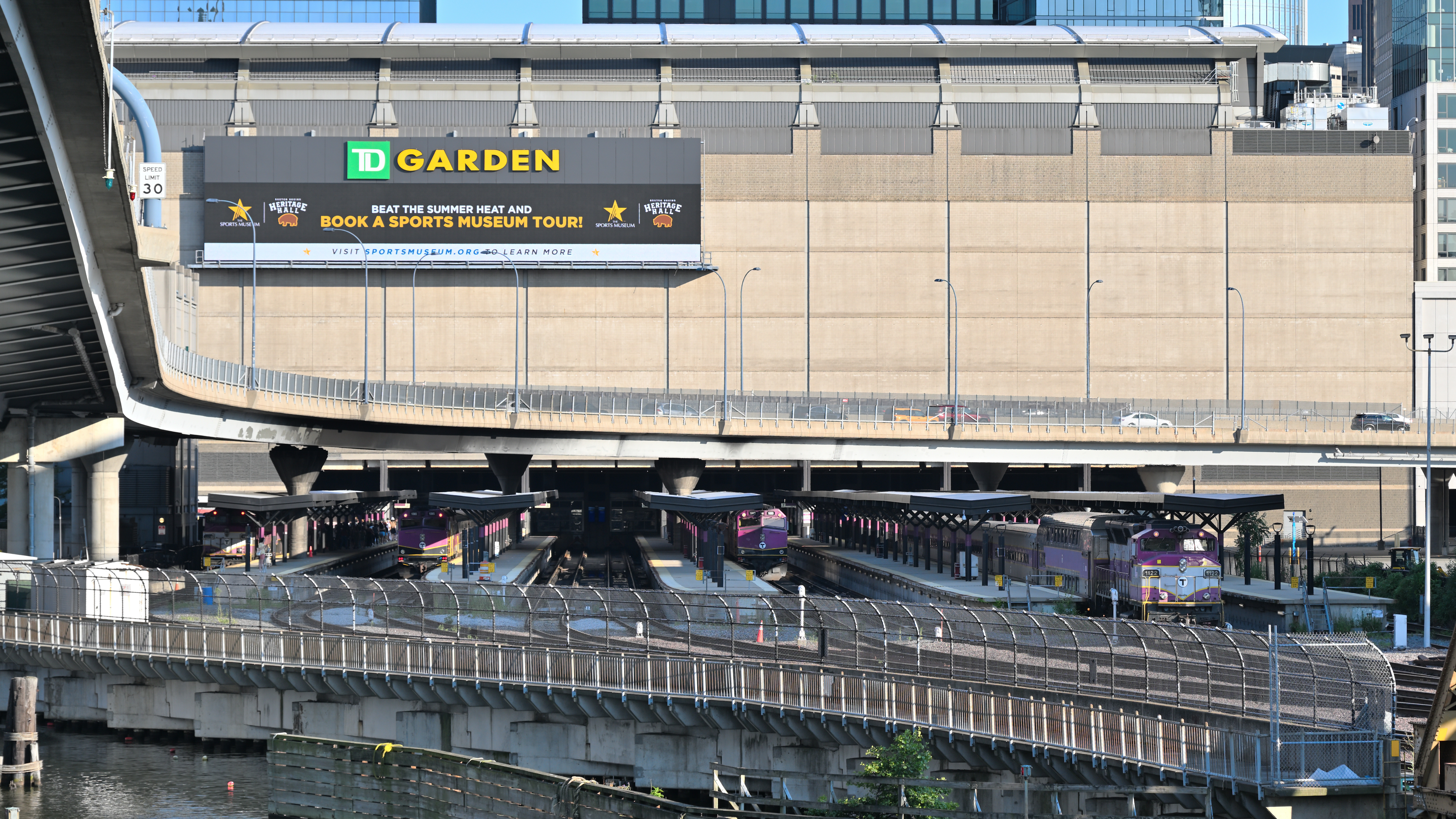
- MBTA Commuter Rail trains at North Station in August 2024

General information
- Location: 126 Causeway Street; Boston, Massachusetts; United States
- Coordinates: 42.36630°N 71.06222°W
- Owner: Massachusetts Bay Transportation Authority
- Lines: Western Route; Eastern Route; New Hampshire Main Line; Fitchburg Route
- Platforms: 5 island platforms
- Tracks: 10
- Connections: at North Station; MBTA bus: 4; EZRide; MBTA ferry: F10 (at Lovejoy Wharf); Seaport Ferry (at Lovejoy Wharf)

Construction
- Parking: 1,275 spaces (privately owned garage)
- Cycle facilities: 20 spaces; Bluebikes dock
- Accessible: Yes

Other information
- Station code: Amtrak: BON
- Fare zone: 1A (MBTA Commuter Rail)

History
- Opened: 1893 (North Union Station)
- Rebuilt: 1928, 1989, 1995, January 2007

Passengers
- 2024: 11,186 daily boardings (MBTA Commuter Rail)
- FY 2025: 447,961 annual boardings and alightings (Amtrak)
Services
Preceding station	Amtrak	Following station
Terminus	Downeaster	Woburn toward Brunswick
Preceding station	MBTA	Following station
Porter toward Wachusett	Fitchburg Line	Terminus
West Medford toward Lowell	Lowell Line	Terminus
Ballardvale toward Haverhill	Haverhill Line (limited service via Wildcat Branch)	Terminus
Terminus	Haverhill Line	Malden Center toward Haverhill
Terminus	Newburyport/Rockport Line	Chelsea toward Newburyport or Rockport
Former services
Preceding station	MBTA	Following station
Cambridge toward Bedford	Lexington Branch (closed 1977)	Terminus
Cambridge toward South Sudbury	Central Mass Branch (closed 1971)	Terminus
Preceding station	Boston and Maine Railroad	Following station
Cambridge toward Northampton	Central Mass Branch	Terminus
Cambridge toward Fitchburg	Boston – Fitchburg	Terminus
Fitchburg toward Montreal	Green Mountain Flyer / Mount Royal	Terminus
Cambridge toward Troy	Boston – Troy	Terminus
Union Square toward Waltham	Watertown Branch	Terminus
Prospect Hill toward Concord, NH	Boston – Concord, NH	Terminus
Terminus	Western Route	East Somerville toward Portland
Terminus	Eastern Route	East Somerville toward Portland
Terminus	Boston – Dover until 1967	East Somerville toward Dover
Terminus	Boston – Haverhill	East Somerville toward Haverhill
Terminus	Medford Branch	East Somerville toward Medford
Location

North Station is a commuter rail and intercity rail terminal station in Boston, Massachusetts. It is served by four MBTA Commuter Rail lines – the Fitchburg Line, Haverhill Line, Lowell Line, and Newburyport/Rockport Line – and the Amtrak Downeaster intercity service. The concourse is located under the TD Garden arena, with the platforms extending north towards drawbridges over the Charles River. The eponymous subway station, served by the Green Line and Orange Line, is connected to the concourse with an underground passageway.

== Description ==
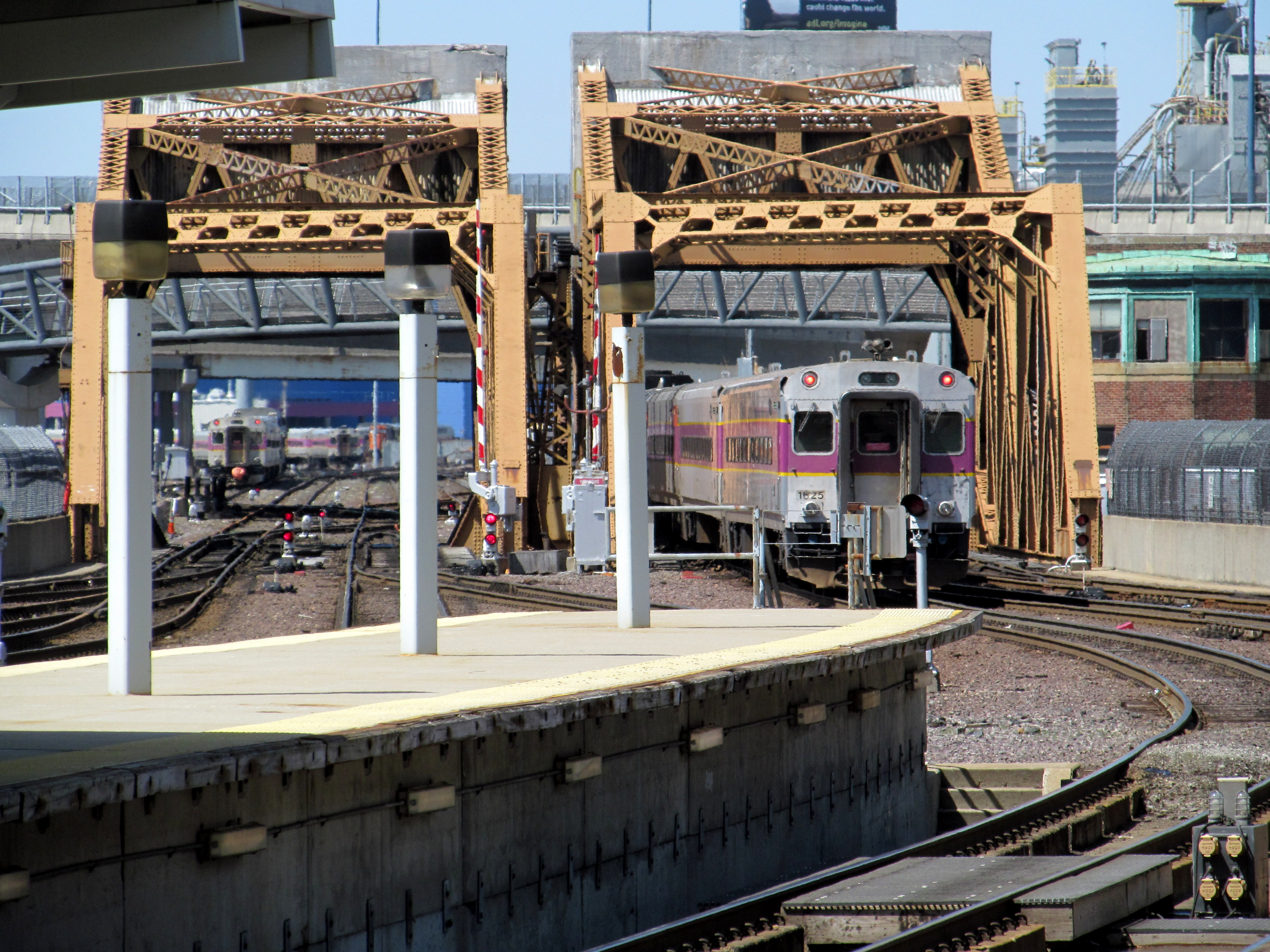
Platforms and drawbridges at North Station

The concourse of the station, named for longtime Boston Celtics coach and executive Red Auerbach, is located under the TD Garden arena, with two entrances from Causeway Street, as well as entrances from Nashua Street to the west. Five island platforms serving ten tracks run north from the concourse. Just north of the platforms, a pair of two-track drawbridges cross the Charles River. Eight commuter rail lines and three Amtrak services terminate at South Station about 1 mile (1.6 km) to the south, with no direct rail link between the two stations. The proposed North–South Rail Link would link the two halves of the commuter rail system, with new underground platforms at both stations.

North Station is accessible on all modes. MBTA bus route 4 runs on Causeway Street, with stops near Canal Street. The EZRide Shuttle loops on Red Auerbach Way with a stop near the secondary entrance to North Station.

Lovejoy Wharf, located off Beverly Street northeast of North Station, is the head of navigation of the Charles River due to the adjacent Charles River Dam. It is served by MBTA ferry route F10, a privately operated Seaport ferry, and water taxi services to Logan Airport and the Boston waterfront.

== History ==
=== Previous stations ===
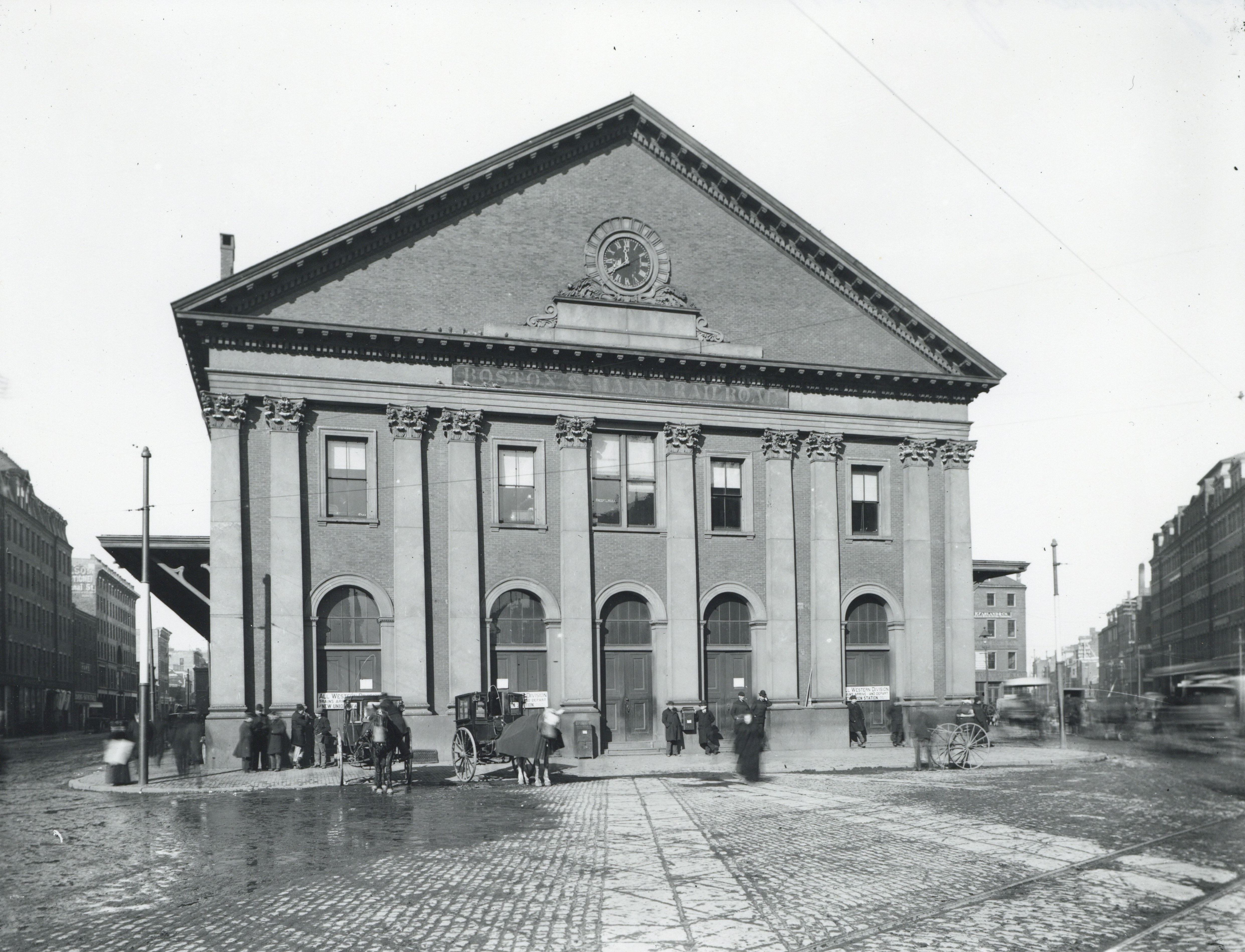
The B&M terminal around 1894

The four major northside railroads originally built separate terminal stations in Boston. The Boston and Lowell Railroad (B&L) was the first to open, with service beginning on June 24, 1835. The first station was built later in 1835 along Lowell Street (now Lomasney Way) and was several blocks north of Causeway Street. A new station was built at Causeway Street east of Nashua Street in 1857, with the original depot converted to a freight house. An even larger third station on the Causeway Street site, constructed of brick with towers at the front corners, was opened on November 24, 1873.

The Boston and Maine Railroad (B&M) opened in July 1845, with a temporary station at Canal and Traverse streets. The permanent station, opened on October 20, was between Canal and Haverhill streets and fronted on Haymarket Square. Trains had to cross busy Causeway Street to reach the station; at first, a city ordinance required the railroad to pull cars across the street with oxen rather than locomotives. In 1867, the station was extended northwards from Market Street to Traverse Street.

The 1843-opened Fitchburg Railroad originally terminated in Charlestown, near the north end of the Warren Bridge. On August 9, 1848, the railroad opened a new station with large Norman style towers at Causeway Street, just east of the B&M tracks. The second floor was the largest auditorium in New England at the time; it was the site of two performances by Jenny Lind in October 1850 during her tour of the United States.

The Eastern Railroad opened in 1838 with an East Boston terminal; ferries carried passengers between there and Lewis Wharf in Boston. On April 10, 1854, the railroad opened its Boston terminal on Causeway Street opposite Friend Street – west of the B&M tracks and east of the soon-to-be-built B&L station. This "temporary" station was destroyed by fire on June 21, 1862. The brick replacement station, completed the next year, "had a reputation of being dirty, unattractive, and uninviting."

=== North Union Station ===
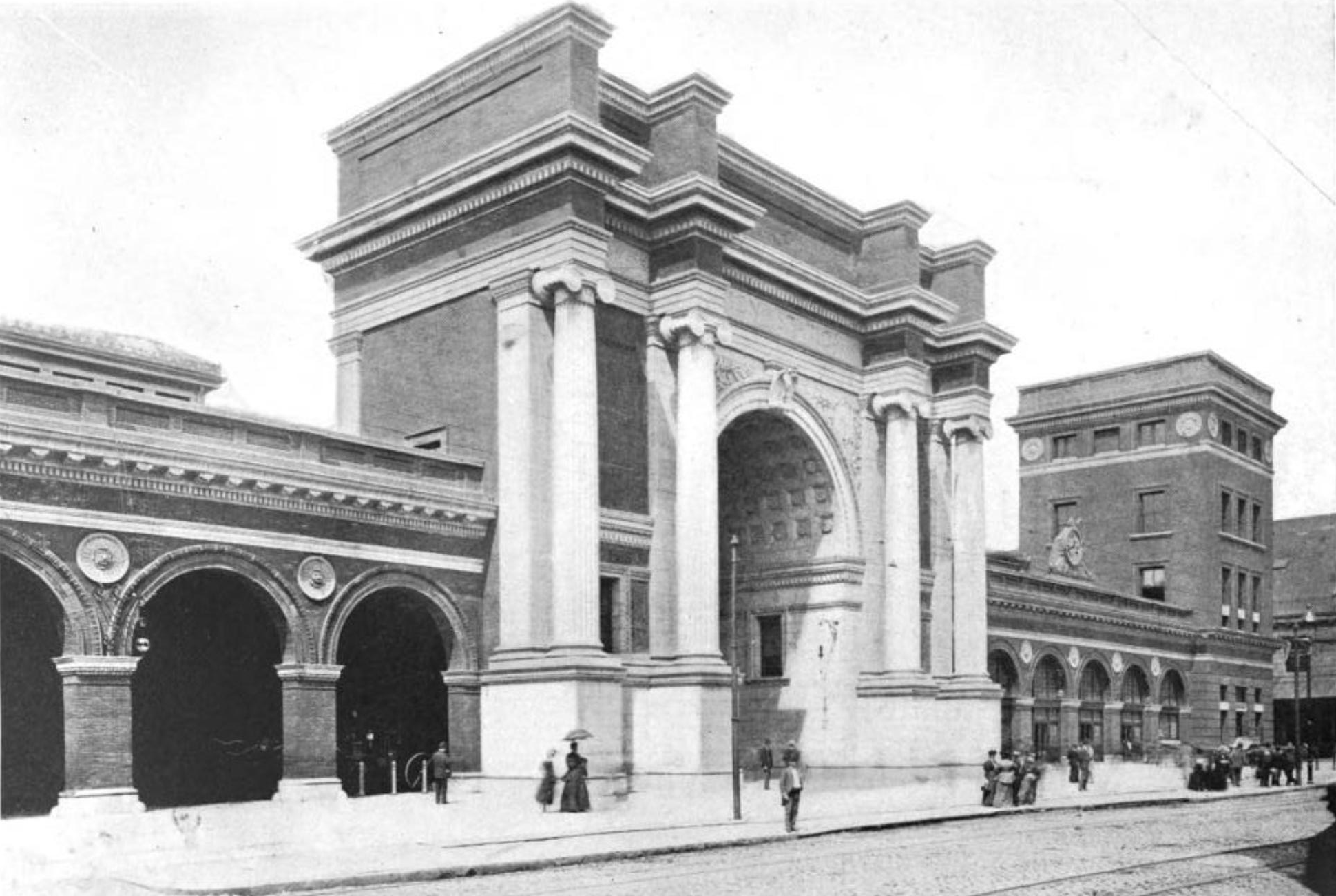
North Union Station around 1897

The B&M leased the Eastern in 1884, though it continued to use its own terminal. As a condition of the B&M's 1887 lease of the B&L, the state required the B&M to construct a union station for use by the combined B&M system plus the Fitchburg. After years of resistance by the B&M, construction on North Union Station began in 1893. The station was built as an eastward expansion of the B&L station, with a total frontage of 568 feet (173 m) on Causeway Street. The center of the new facade was an 80-foot (24 m)-high granite triumphal arch flanked by four massive columns. The east side was formed by a five-story baggage and express building. The station was designed by the firm of Shepley, Rutan and Coolidge, which designed South Station several years later.

The new station was opened in stages from August 1893 to June 1894. The Eastern depot had been demolished in 1893 to allow construction to proceed. The B&M depot was demolished in 1897, with the site used for the Canal Street incline of the Tremont Street subway. The Fitchburg was leased by the B&M in 1900, after which the former Fitchburg depot was used as the B&M offices. By that time, the station was popularly known as "North Station". The former Fitchburg depot burned on January 17, 1925; it was demolished in 1926–28.

=== North Station ===
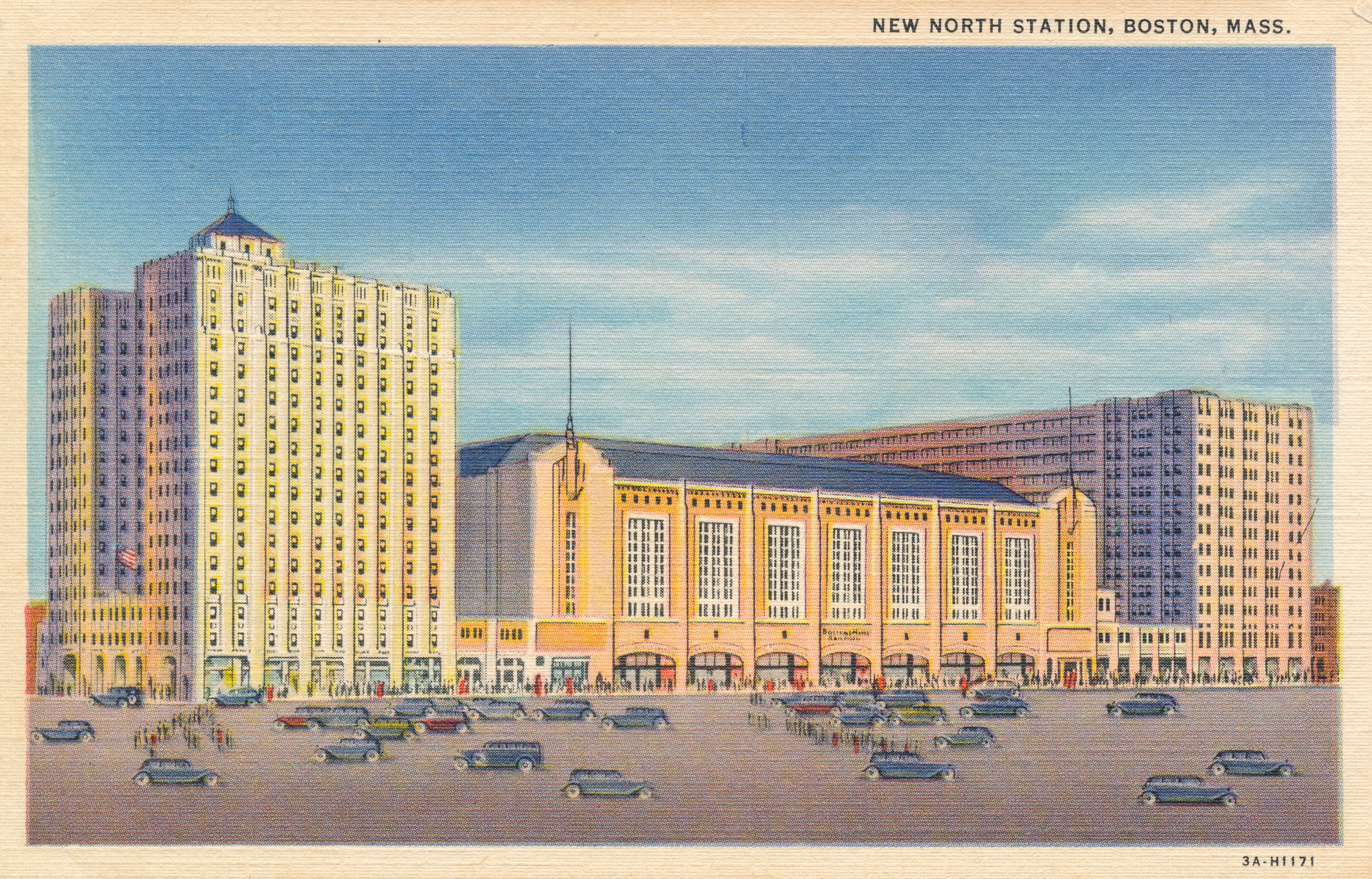
North Station c. 1928

In 1926, the B&M began work on an expansion and modernization of the freight yards north of North Station in Somerville. The next November, the railroad announced plans for a new North Station complex. Demolition of the old station began the next month. The partially-complete station was opened on August 19, 1928; it was formally opened on November 14, 1928 – one year after the original announcement.

The new station had 22 tracks paired around island platforms, largely similar to its previous configuration. The concourse was topped with the Boston Garden arena, with a 14-story office building to the east and a hotel to the west. (Early plans had called for these to be integrated into the station like the arena.) The complex fronted on Causeway Street for 700 feet (210 m) from Nashua Street to Beverly Street. A project lasting from August 26, 1930 to mid-1931 rebuilt the approach to the station, with four new drawbridges crossing a relocated Charles River channel.

Until the 1960s, the station was the hub for long-distance B&M service to multiple locales north and west of Boston, usually in conjunction with other railroads. Service cutbacks began in the 1950s, and service soon dwindled down to commuter rail operations. The last intercity service to Portland, Maine, and to north of Concord, New Hampshire, ended on January 4, 1965. By this point, the intercity train itineraries consisted of self-propelled Budd Rail Diesel Cars, often just one or two cars for the trip. Single commuter-oriented daily round trips on these routes to Concord and Dover, New Hampshire, lasted until June 30, 1967. (Limited MBTA Commuter Rail service to Concord ran from January 28, 1980, to March 1, 1981, as part of a federally funded experiment.) In the 1960s, the B&M removed two drawbridges and cut the station to ten tracks. The south end of the platforms were removed to make room for a parking lot.

Prior interstate train service from North Station:

Name	Final B & M station at peak level	Partner railroad in continuing joint train service	Final destination	Year discontinued
Minute Man	Troy, New York, via Fitchburg, Massachusetts, and Greenfield, Massachusetts	New York Central	Chicago, Illinois	1957
The Cheshire	Bellows Falls, Vermont, via Fitchburg, Massachusetts, and Keene, New Hampshire	-	-	1958
Green Mountain Flyer	Bellows Falls, Vermont	Rutland Railway	Burlington, Vermont, Montreal, Quebec	1953
Mount Royal	Bellows Falls, Vermont	Rutland Railway	Burlington, Vermont, Montreal, Quebec	1953
Ambassador	White River Junction, Vermont, via Lowell, Massachusetts, and Concord, New Hampshire	Central Vermont Railway	Essex Junction, Vermont, Montreal, Quebec	1956
Alouette	Wells River, Vermont, via Lowell, Massachusetts, and Concord, New Hampshire	Canadian Pacific Railway	Montreal, Quebec	1956 (unnamed train from 1956–1965)
Connecticut Yankee	Travelling as the Red Wing via Concord, New Hampshire, and Plymouth, New Hampshire, then connecting with main route from New York City at White River Junction, Vermont	Central Vermont Railway; Quebec Central Railway	Quebec City, Quebec, via Sherbrooke, Quebec	c. 1952
Flying Yankee	Portland, Maine, via Dover, New Hampshire	Maine Central Railroad	Bangor, Maine	1957
The Gull	Portland, Maine	Maine Central Railroad; Canadian Pacific Railway; Canadian National Railway	Halifax, Nova Scotia, via Saint John, New Brunswick	1960
Kennebec Limited	Portland, Maine	Maine Central Railroad	Vanceboro, Maine	1958
Mountaineer (summer only)	Littleton, New Hampshire, via North Conway, and Crawford Notch in the White Mountains	Maine Central Railroad	Intervale, New Hampshire	1955
Penobscot	Portland, Maine	Maine Central Railroad	Bangor, Maine	1957
Pine Tree Limited	Portland, Maine	Maine Central Railroad	Bangor, Maine	1958
Red Wing	Wells River, Vermont, via Lowell, Massachusetts, and Concord, New Hampshire	Canadian Pacific Railway	Montreal, Quebec	1959

=== MBTA era ===
==== New station ====
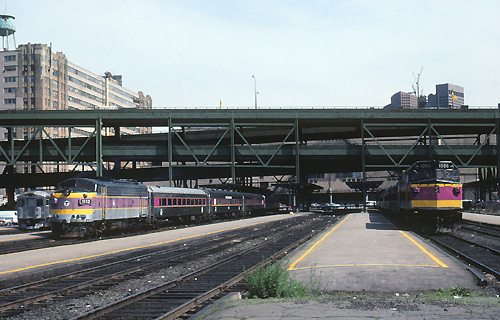
Trains at North Station in 1988, viewed from the north end of the island platforms

On January 20, 1984, a fire destroyed the wooden trestles leading to the North Station drawbridges. Temporary terminals were soon established: Haverhill/Reading trains terminated at Oak Grove, Rockport/Ipswich trains at a temporary platform at Sullivan, and Lowell and Gardner trains at a temporary station near Lechmere. On June 28, 1984, the MBTA awarded a $11.3 million contract for construction of replacement trestles plus new tracks and platforms. The rebuilt station opened on April 20, 1985. On March 29, 1989, the MBTA awarded a $13.7 million construction contract to raise the five commuter rail platforms for accessibility. (Until then, a modified forklift was used as a mobile lift.) Groundbreaking was held for the underground garage on June 25, 1990, followed by the platform project on July 12. However, the nearest accessible subway transfer was State station over half a mile away; not until 2001 were the North Station and Haymarket subway stations made accessible.

In February 1993, the state reached a deal with a developer for the replacement of the aging Boston Garden. In exchange for the land and easements to construct the FleetCenter, the developer would construct a new train shed and waiting area on the ground floor of the new arena. The MBTA would also be granted easements for a Green Line tunnel under the arena to replace the Causeway Street Elevated, for a combined underground "superstation" for the Green and Orange lines, and for pedestrian access to North Station. The FleetCenter, North Station concourse, and garage opened in 1995.

Two MBTA ferry routes – the F3 Lovejoy Wharf – Boston Navy Yard and F5 Lovejoy Wharf – World Trade Center via Moakley Courthouse – began operation in 1997 during Big Dig construction. They were discontinued on January 21, 2005 due to low ridership. The F5X Lovejoy Wharf – World Trade Center Express route, which did not rely on MBTA funding, was run until February 24, 2006. A one-year pilot of the privately funded Fan Pier route, intended mostly as a private employee shuttle, began in January 2019. A new MBTA route, the F10 Harbor Loop, was added on June 29, 2026.

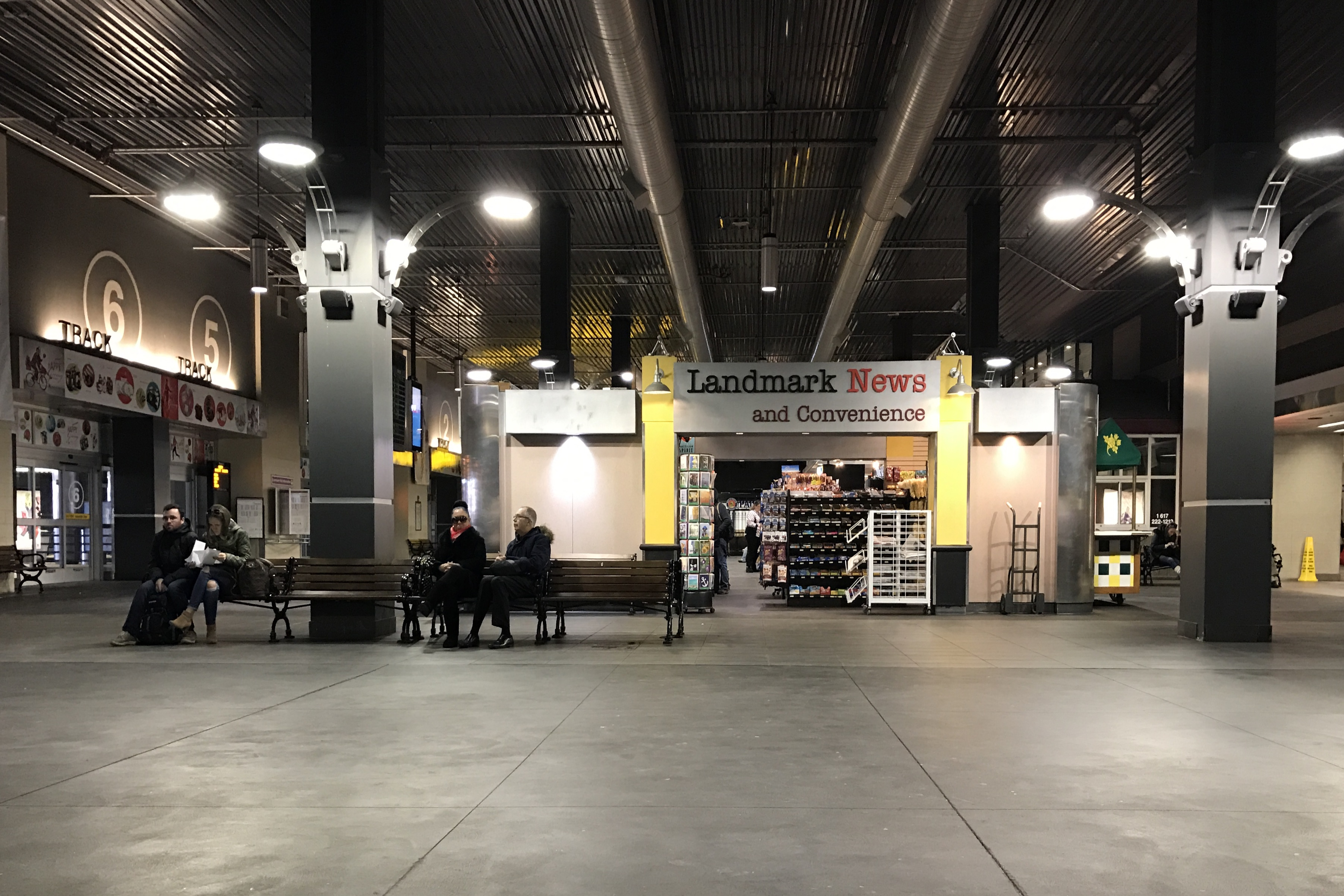
The 2007-expanded waiting area in 2017

In 2001, intercity service returned to North Station with Amtrak's Downeaster to Portland, Maine (later extended to Brunswick). In April 2006, the MBTA announced plans for an enlargement of the waiting area at North Station. The project covered over the southern 80 feet (24 m) of the platforms, adding 20,000 square feet (1,900 m^{2}) of waiting and retail space. The $5 million project was completed in February 2007. Two large train information displays, with electronic noises to imitate Solari boards, were added in November 2007.

Beginning in early 2016, Boston Properties built 'The Hub On Causeway', a mixed-use development including two towers, on the former Boston Garden site. The development included a new entrance to the rail station from Causeway Street opposite Canal Street, plus an underground passageway from the rail station to the subway station. The passageway opened on January 6, 2019. Installation of fare gates on the North Station concourse began on March 24, 2022. The gates were activated on October 1, 2022.

==== Drawbridge replacement ====
The two aging two-track drawbridges at North Station are planned to be replaced by three new two-track spans, which will be more reliable and have higher capacity. The unfinished sixth platform will be completed to serve long out-of-service tracks 11 and 12, the Fitchburg mainline will be slightly relocated to provide more layover space near the maintenance facility, and FX interlocking will be reconfigured. The signals contract associated with the new drawbridges was awarded in May 2019. By November 2022, signal work was expected to be completed in August 2023. Design of the new vertical lift bridges began in 2019 and was 75% complete by May 2023, with design completion expected in 2024. In September 2024, the MBTA was awarded a $472 million federal grant for the bridge replacement.

The draft environmental assessment was released in December 2024, with construction then expected to last from 2025 to 2034. The MBTA awarded a $1.06-billion design-build contract in April 2026 and issued notice to proceed in May. Groundbreaking took place in September 2026. At that time, the $1.286 billion project was expected to be complete in late 2032.
