= North Wilmington station =

Train station in Wilmington, Massachusetts, US

North Wilmington
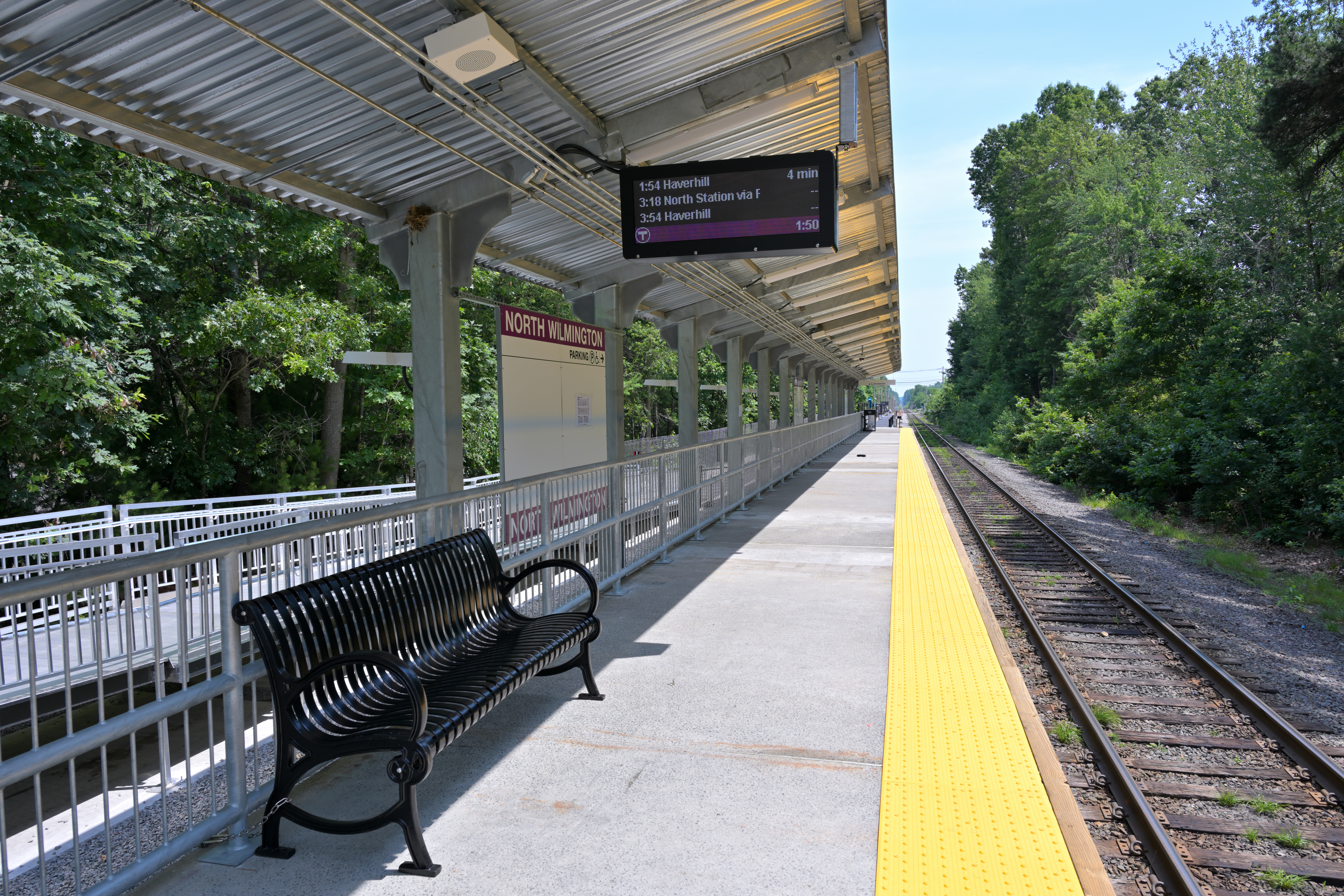
- North Wilmington station in July 2025

General information
- Location: 370 Middlesex Avenue (Route 62); Wilmington, Massachusetts
- Coordinates: 42.57105°N 71.16094°W
- Line: Western Route
- Platforms: 1 side platform
- Tracks: 1

Construction
- Parking: 20 spaces (free)
- Accessible: Yes

Other information
- Fare zone: 3

History
- Opened: c. 1849; December 19, 1979
- Closed: June 14, 1959
- Rebuilt: c. 1914; 1992; 2024–2025

Passengers
- 2024: 27 daily boardings

Services
Preceding station	MBTA	Following station
Reading toward North Station	Haverhill Line	Ballardvale toward Haverhill
Location

North Wilmington station is an MBTA Commuter Rail station in the North Wilmington village in Wilmington, Massachusetts. The station has a single accessible high-level side platform north of Middlesex Avenue (Route 62). It is served by all Boston–Haverhill trains on the Haverhill Line except for a small number that use the Wildcat Branch.

The Boston and Maine Railroad (B&M) built a new line through Wilmington in 1845 and began stopping there around 1849. A station was built in 1851 and renamed North Wilmington in 1888. The station was destroyed by a fire in 1914, and a new structure was built. The ticket office closed in 1949; all service to North Wilmington ended in 1959. A local newspaper rented the building in 1955 and bought it in 1960. It was damaged by fire in 1988 and demolished in 1991.

Under the Massachusetts Bay Transportation Authority (MBTA), Haverhill Line service to North Wilmington resumed in 1979. Trains initially stopped at the Middlesex Avenue grade crossing. A small platform nearby was built in 1992 to prevent stopped trains from blocking emergency vehicles at the grade crossing. Planning for an accessible platform further from the crossing began in 2018. Construction started in 2024, and the new platform opened in June 2025. Additional work is planned in 2029–2030 as part of double-tracking of the line.

== Station design ==
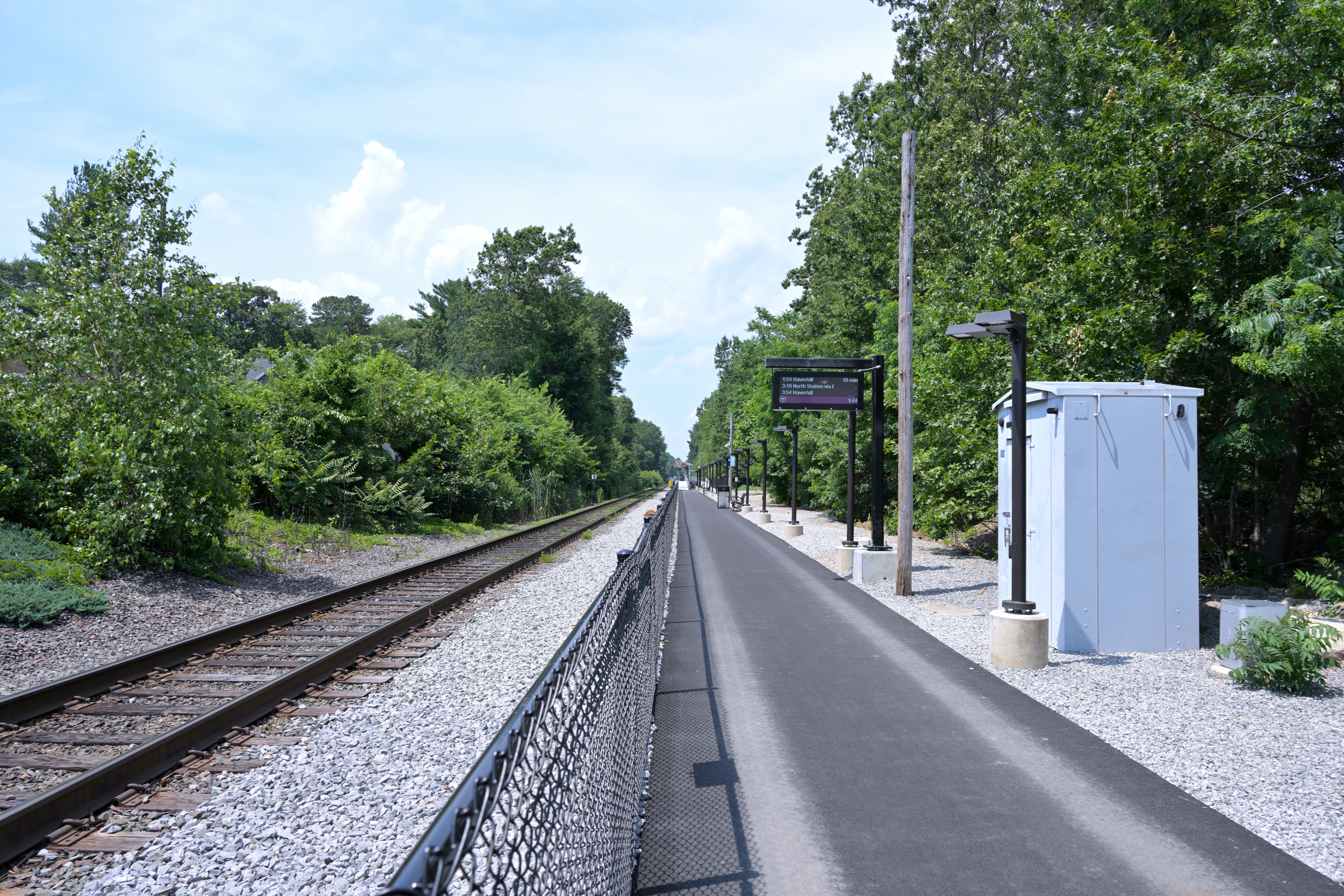
The walkway to the platform

North Wilmington station is located in the North Wilmington village in Wilmington, Massachusetts. The single-track Western Route runs approximately northwest–southeast through the station area. The station has a single accessible high-level side platform, measuring 200 by 9 feet (61.0 m × 2.7 m), on the east side of the track. A canopy covers the platform. A ramp and walkway run 705 feet (215 m) southeast to Middlesex Avenue (Route 62), which crosses the line at grade. A 20-space parking lot is located off Middlesex Avenue. The station is served by all Boston–Haverhill trains on the Haverhill Line except for a small number that use the Wildcat Branch. As of 2025, it is a flag stop (where trains only stop upon passenger request) except for peak-hour peak-direction weekday trains.

== History ==
=== Boston and Maine ===
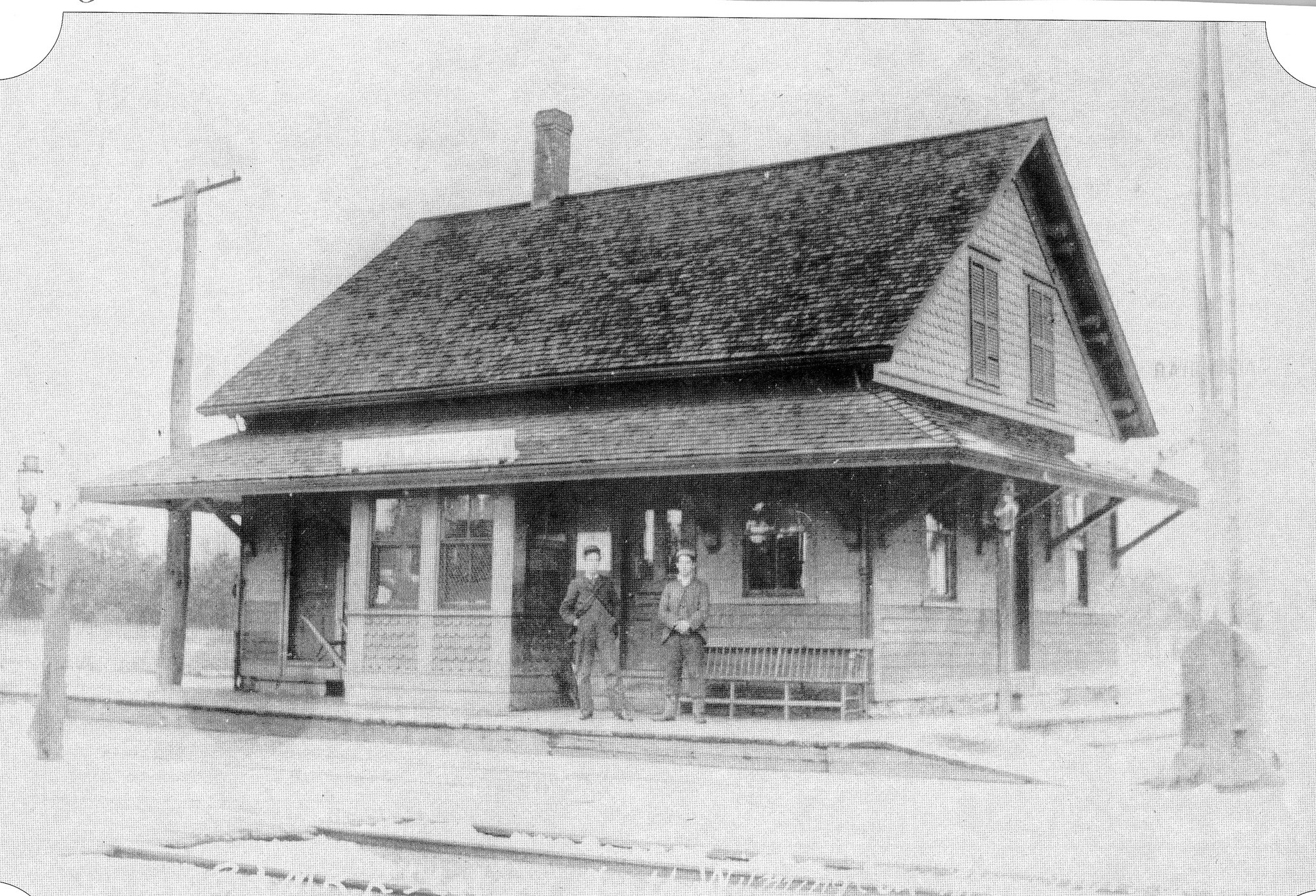
North Wilmington station before it was destroyed by a 1914 fire

The Boston and Lowell Railroad (B&L) opened between its namesake cities via Wilmington in 1835. The Andover and Wilmington Railroad opened between Wilmington and Andover on August 8, 1836, using the B&L to access Boston. After extensions further north over the following years, it became the Boston and Maine Railroad (B&M) in 1842. As the B&M grew, using the B&L became insufficient for its purposes. On July 1, 1845, the B&M opened its own route into Boston, which split off its original line at Wilmington Junction in northern Wilmington. The original alignment between Wilmington and Wilmington Junction was used for shuttle service until 1848 and abandoned around 1850; it was rebuilt by the B&L in 1874 and became the Wildcat Branch.

The B&M began stopping at Wilmington on the new route around 1849. A station building was constructed in 1851. It was located on Middlesex Street about 1.7 miles (2.7 km) northeast of the Wilmington town center (where the B&L station was located). Schedules suitable for commuting to Boston were tried intermittently beginning in the 1840s and implemented permanently by the 1850s. The village of North Wilmington grew around the station. The B&M leased the B&L in 1887. To eliminate duplicate names, the B&M station was renamed North Wilmington in November 1888, while the B&L station retained its name. The B&M main line became the Western Route, while the B&L became the Southern Division.

By the early 20th century, the 1 1/2-story wooden station building was located on the east side of the tracks on the north side of Middlesex Avenue. On July 26, 1907, a Portland–Boston train rear-ended a Haverhill–Boston train about 600 feet (180 m) northwest of the station, injuring several passengers. The station was robbed twice in 1908–09; on the second occasion, the burglars blew open the safe with explosives. The station building was destroyed in a fire caused by a defective chimney on October 26, 1914. The loss was estimated at $1,500 for the station (equivalent to $35,000 in 2024) and $500 for the contents (equivalent to $12,000). (Note: Some later sources claim the fire was in 1912.) Its replacement was a one-story building at the same site.

=== Closure ===
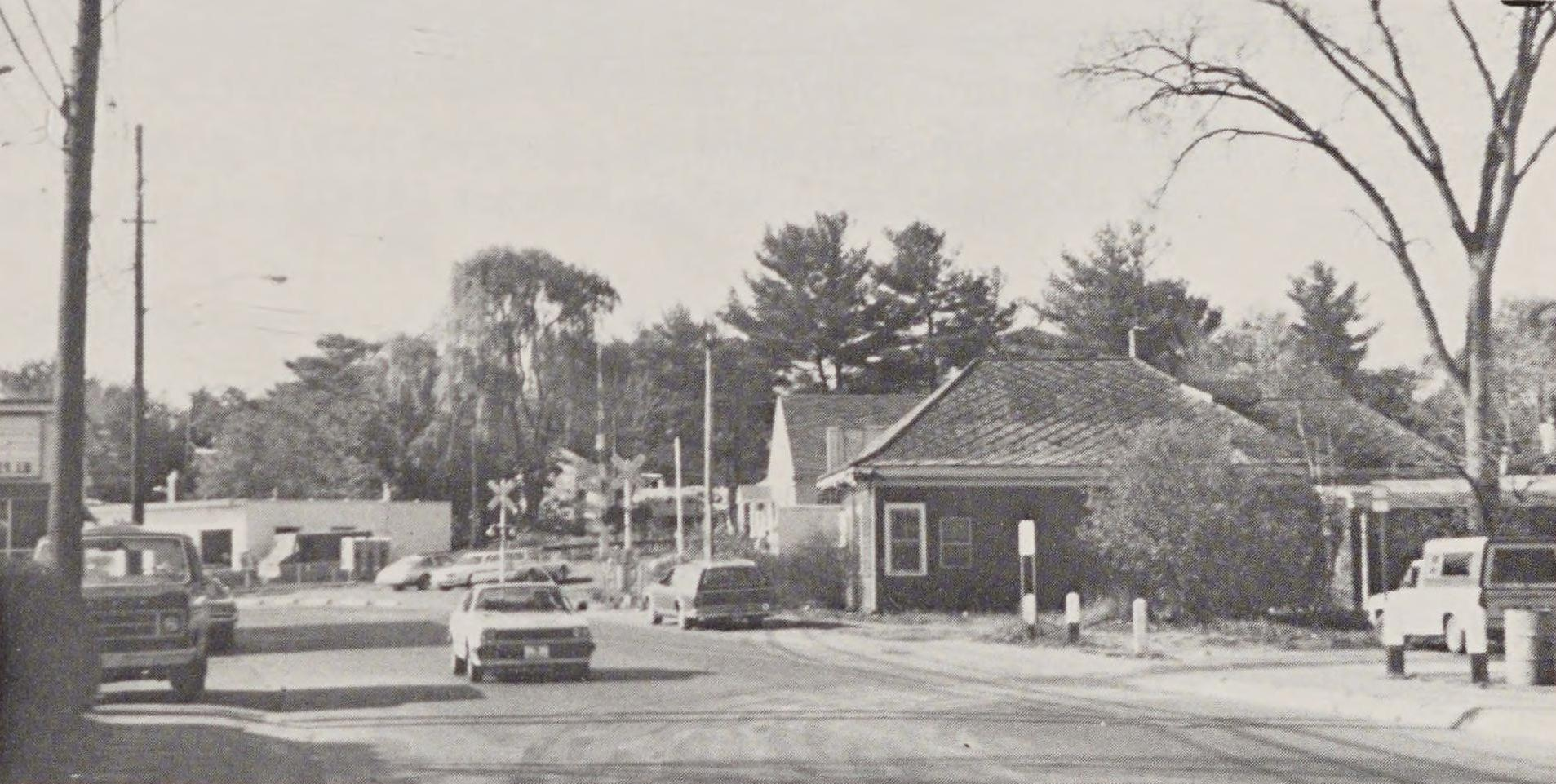
The former station building used as the Town Crier office, seen around 1980

The ticket office at the station closed in 1949. A taxi company rented the building from the B&M, with the waiting room kept open to passengers. In late 1954, the B&M proposed to demolish the building in favor of a parking lot. A 12-by-24-foot (3.7 m × 7.3 m) cinder block shelter would have replaced a smaller existing shelter on the west side of the tracks. When the Wilmington Town Crier – a local newspaper – was founded in November 1955, it rented the building as its office and sublet portions to other businesses.

By 1957, North Wilmington was served by 11 southbound and 15 northbound trains on weekdays. The B&M proposed major service cuts, including the closure of several branch lines, in December 1958. North Wilmington was among the stations to be closed. All trains serving Andover and points north would be rerouted over the Wildcat Branch and the Southern Division; the section of the Western Route between Reading and Wilmington Junction would become freight-only.

Despite the objections of Wilmington and other affected municipalities, the cuts were approved by the Massachusetts Department of Public Utilities (DPU) in May 1959. They took effect on June 14, 1959. As required by the DPU, the B&M opened a new stop at Salem Street on the Wildcat Branch to replace North Wilmington. The town sued the DPU to prevent the closure of North Wilmington station; in January 1961, the Massachusetts Supreme Judicial Court ruled against the town. The owner of the Town Crier purchased the building from the B&M in 1960; he added a room to the rear of the building in 1965.

=== MBTA era ===
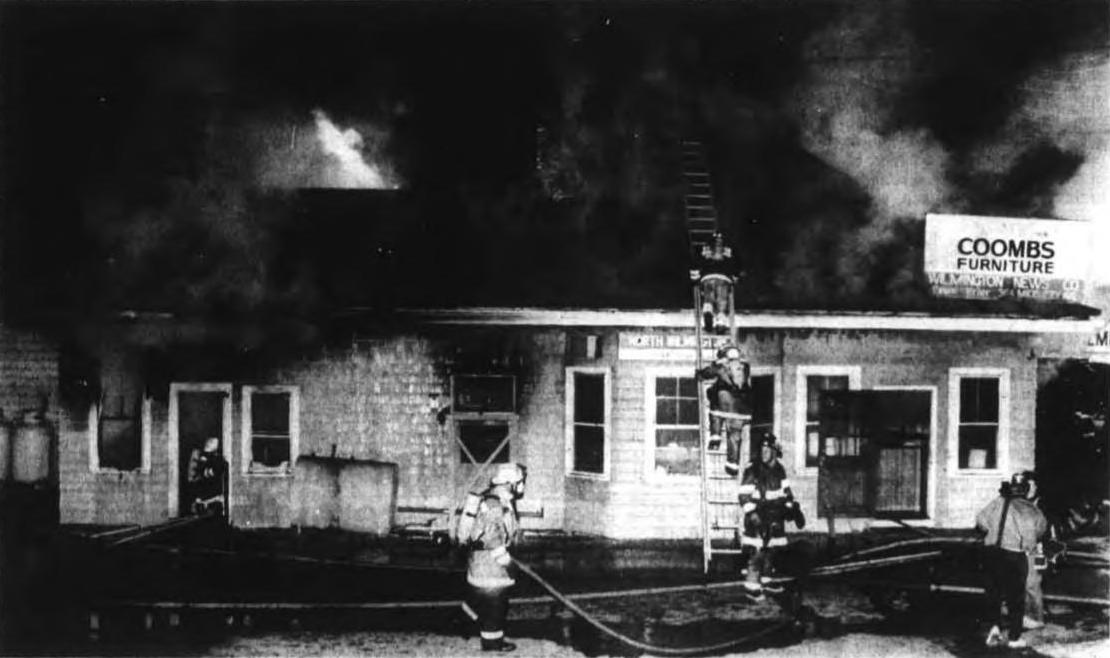
The former station on fire in 1988

The Massachusetts Bay Transportation Authority (MBTA) was formed in August 1964 to subsidize suburban commuter rail service. On January 18, 1965, the MBTA began subsidizing expanded service within its funding district, of which Wilmington was the northern limit. Boston–Haverhill trains were eliminated; service on the Wildcat Branch was cut to a single Boston–Dover round trip. That trip was cut back to Haverhill on June 30, 1967, and Salem Street station was closed. The remaining Haverhill round trip ended on June 30, 1976. The MBTA purchased most of the B&M commuter assets, including the Western Route, on December 27, 1976.

Planning began in 1978 for restoration of Haverhill service using the Merrimack Valley Regional Transit Authority as a funding intermediary. Service resumed on December 17, 1979, initially with five weekday round trips – two of which did not stop at North Wilmington. This Haverhill Line service used the pre-1959 route via Reading; track between Reading and Wilmington Junction was rebuilt for passenger service. At North Wilmington, trains stopped at the Middlesex Street grade crossing, with no platforms, station facilities, or parking. A stop at Concord Street to the south, either supplementing or replacing North Wilmington, was also considered at the time.

Weekend service on the line began in April 1980. A small amount of Haverhill Line service was rerouted over the Wildcat Branch beginning in May 1981, skipping North Wilmington. The former station building was heavily damaged by a fire that began late on February 24, 1988. That year, the MBTA proposed to take the damaged building and several nearby buildings by eminent domain to create a 400-car park and ride lot and built a platform. However, the plan was put on hold that December. The former station building, vacant since the fire, was demolished in July 1991.

=== Reconstructions ===
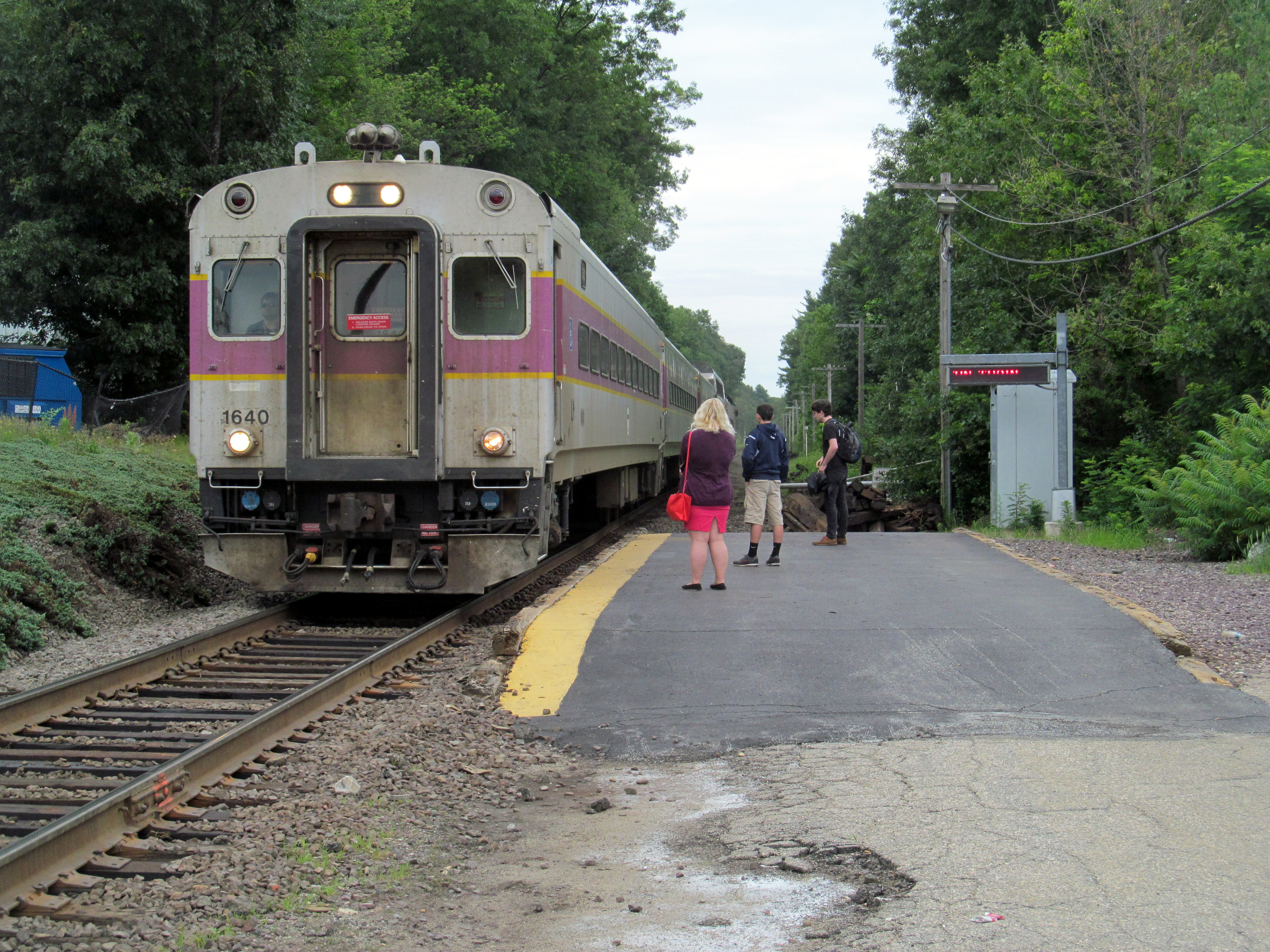
A train at the 1992-built platform

Because trains stopped at the Middlesex Avenue grade crossing, they blocked the street for several minutes during stops, which caused delays for emergency vehicles. In June 1992, the town pushed the MBTA to build a platform nearby to avoid blocking the crossing. A platform was completed that August. Located slightly north of the grade crossing, it was a short section of asphalt with a nearby bus shelter for passengers. While the crossing gates would still be down while trains stopped at North Wilmington, emergency vehicles would be able to maneuver around the gates. The low-level platform was not accessible; it was intended to be temporary, as the MBTA then planned to add a second track to the line and build a permanent platform.

Despite the platform, trains continued to intermittently block the crossing over the following decades. In July 2018, the MBTA agreed to consider near-term changes as well as a later station reconstruction to fix the problem. In April 2019, the town considered but rejected a proposal to eliminate lesser-used midday flag stops at the station. That June, the town proposed a temporary platform further from the crossing as an interim solution pending a full station reconstruction. In early 2020, the town set aside $180,000 to design a temporary platform.

In February 2020, the MBTA agreed to fund the design and construction of a new accessible platform. It would be built from a section of a demolished bridge, similar to Bourne station. In January 2021, the MBTA received a $1 million Federal Transit Administration grant for the project. By May 2021, work was expected to be complete by the end of 2021. On January 21, 2022, a motorist was killed when an inbound train struck her auto at the grade crossing. The initial MBTA investigation indicated that the crossing gates did not function due to an error by a signal technician who was performing preventive maintenance.

In December 2022, the MBTA filed environmental documentation for the project. It included a 200-foot (61 m)-long platform that could serve two train cars at once. Original plans had called for a five-car-length platform, but this was deemed not feasible without disturbing nearby wetlands. Rail service on the inner Haverhill Line was suspended from September 9 to November 5, 2023, to accommodate signal work. Unlike other stations, North Wilmington was not served by substitute bus service. A construction contract for the station was advertised in late 2023, with construction then planned to begin in spring 2024. By April 2024, completion was expected that October. The old platform was demolished in spring 2025 during construction work. The new platform ultimately opened on June 30, 2025; a ribbon-cutting ceremony was held on October 3, 2025.

In August 2026, the MBTA received a $139.6 million grant from the Federal Railroad Administration to add 6.8 miles (10.9 km) of double track between Reading and Andover. The project will include reconstruction of North Wilmington and three other stations with accessible mini-high platforms. Construction at North Wilmington was expected to take place in 2029 and 2030.
