= Salem Street station =

Former railway station

Salem Street
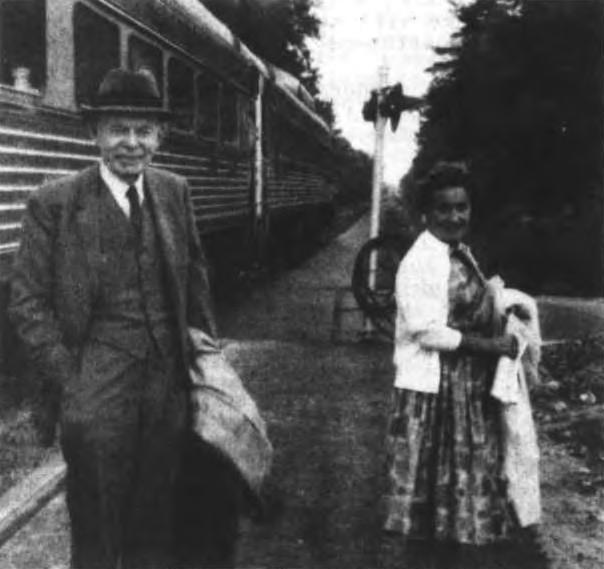
- Passengers at the station in June 1959

General information
- Location: Salem Street; Wilmington, Massachusetts; United States
- Coordinates: 42.5745°N 71.1694°W
- Line: Wildcat Branch
- Platforms: 1 side platform
- Tracks: 1

History
- Opened: June 14, 1959
- Closed: June 30, 1967

Former services
Preceding station	MBTA	Following station
Wilmington toward North Station	Haverhill Line	Ballardvale toward Dover
Location

Salem Street station was a short-lived commuter rail station in Wilmington, Massachusetts in use from 1959 to 1967. It was located at the Salem Street crossing. It was established by the Boston and Maine Railroad (B&M) as the sole stop on the Wildcat Branch, in the wake of a restructuring brought on by service cuts. In 1965, the Massachusetts Bay Transportation Authority started funding MBTA Commuter Rail service on the B&M routes, but closed Salem Street in 1967.

== History ==
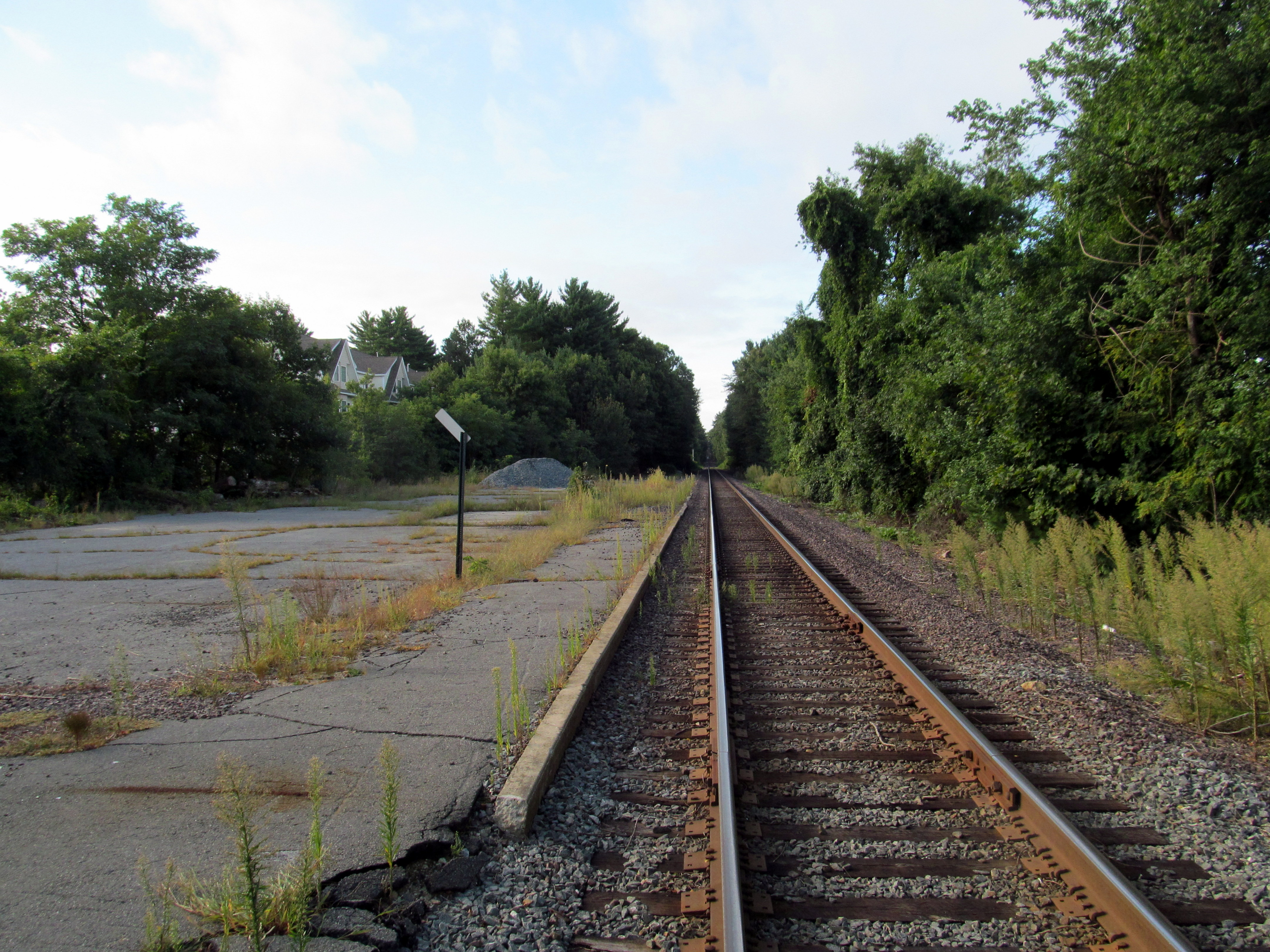
The abandoned platform in 2014

Although the Wildcat Branch was in use from 1836 to 1848 and again from 1874 on, there was no station on the branch. On June 14, 1959, the Boston and Maine Railroad introduced a series of service cutbacks, including the abandonment of the north half of the Woburn Loop. Service on the Western Route (B&M mainline) was discontinued from Reading station to Wilmington Junction; all service to Haverhill station and beyond was rerouted via the Wilmington Branch (now known as the Wildcat Branch). North Wilmington station on the Western Route was replaced with Salem Street. A single low-level platform was built on the east side of the line's single track, along with a small parking area.

When the newly formed MBTA began funding B&M commuter service in January 1965, state subsidies were provided only for service to Reading on the Western Route and Wilmington on the Lowell Line; local governments were required to fund out-of-district service. Salem Street was closed on June 30, 1967, as the B&M cut all service on the line except for a single round trip to Haverhill. That single trip was cut in June 1976.

When Haverhill service resumed as part of the MBTA Commuter Rail system in December 1979, it ran on the pre-1959 routing via Reading. The former stop at Salem Street on the Wildcat Branch, plus the North Andover station on the mainline, were not returned to service. Although several daily Haverhill trains running over the Wildcat Branch were soon added, to be joined by Amtrak Downeaster service beginning in 2001, the Salem Street stop was not reactivated.
