= Wildcat Branch =

Railway line in Massachusetts, U.S.

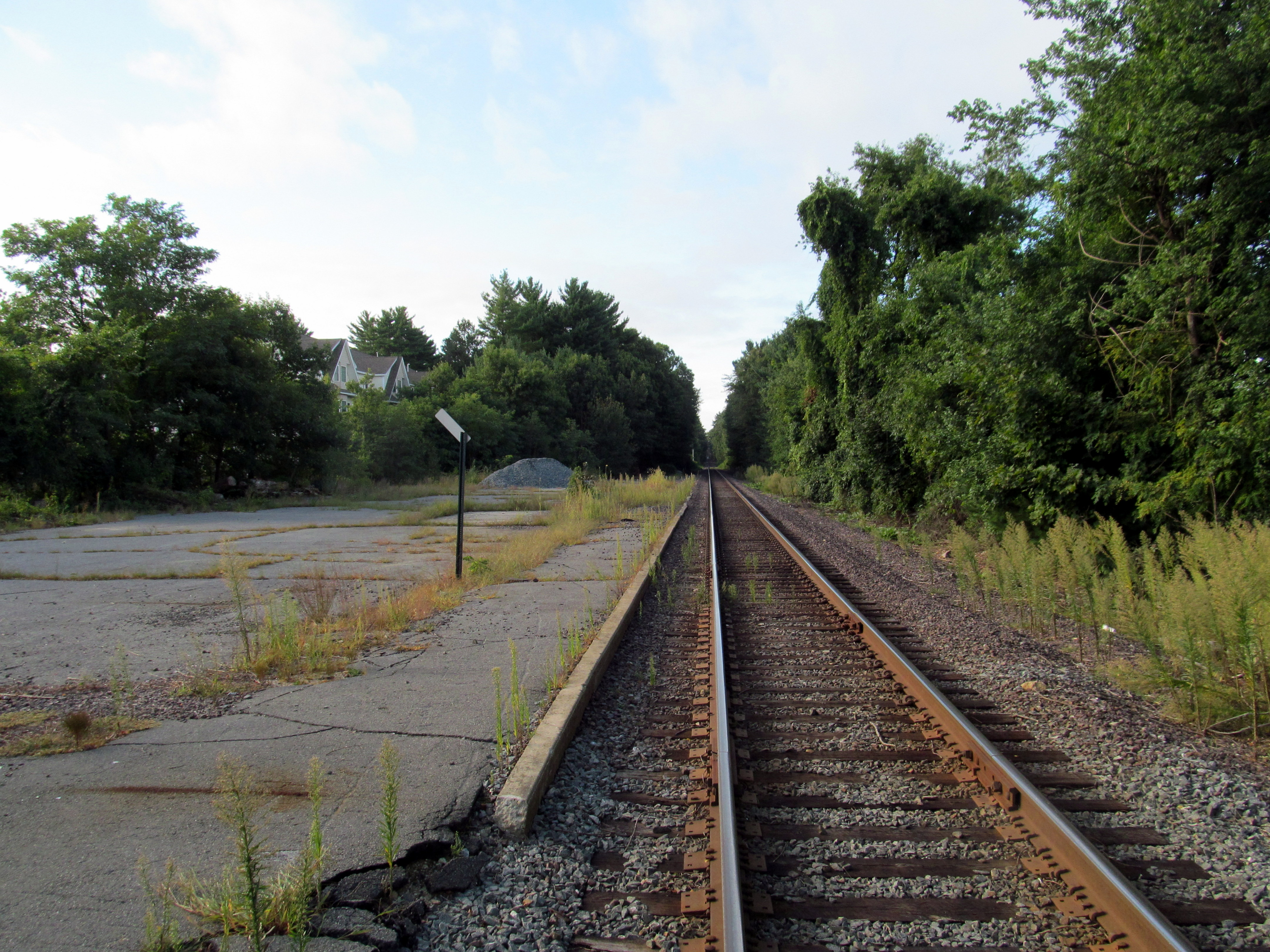
- Wildcat Branch as seen from the former Salem Street station site

The Wildcat Branch is a single track railroad branch line which connects the MBTA Lowell Line in Wilmington, Massachusetts to the MBTA Haverhill Line at Wilmington Junction. The total length of the branch line from the connection with the Lowell Line to the merge with the Haverhill Line is 2.88 miles (4.63 km). It was operated from 1836 to 1848, then rebuilt in 1874, and has been used since.

The branch's name is in reference to Wilmington's high school mascot, the Wildcats. The entire length of the branch line is within the town of Wilmington.

== History ==
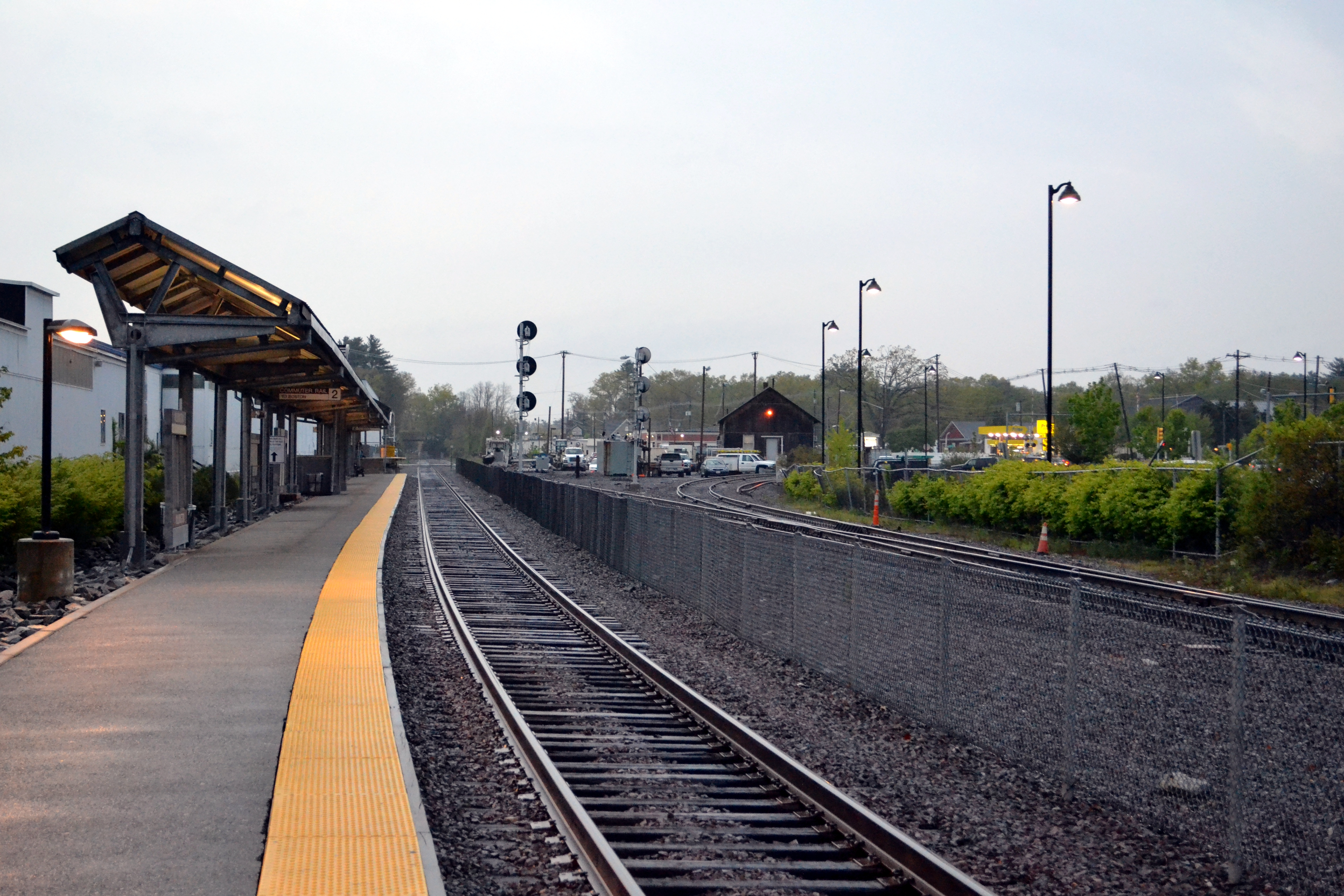
The Wildcat Branch splits from the Lowell line just north of the outbound Wilmington platform.

=== Original line ===
The Boston and Lowell Railroad was chartered on June 5, 1830, and opened between its namesake cities on June 24, 1835. On March 15, 1833, while the B&L was under construction, the Andover and Wilmington Railroad was incorporated to build a branch line from Wilmington to Andover. The A&W opened on August 8, 1836; it became the Andover & Haverhill Railroad which was quickly merged into the nascent Boston and Maine Railroad. By 1843 the B&M ran from Wilmington to Portland, Maine; however, it was still dependent on the B&L to reach Boston. The B&M opened a new route (the Western Route) from Wilmington Junction (three miles north of Wilmington) to Boston via Reading in July 1845, thus negating the need for the original line between Wilmington and Wilmington Junction. The B&L operated the line for three years; its abandonment in 1848 was the first railroad abandonment in New England.

=== Rebuilt line ===
In 1874, the B&L rebuilt the line; some sections are on the original grade, while others are slightly west. Rather than connecting to the B&M mainline, this Wilmington Branch paralleled the Western Route to a new Wilmington Junction station at the junction with the Salem and Lowell Branch. This gave the B&L a route to Lowell via the S&L and the Lowell and Lawrence Railroad. The B&L was merged into the B&M at the end of the 19th century. Passenger service on the S&L was abandoned west of Wilmington Junction in 1924 and east of it in 1932, but the branch was used to run some service to Haverhill and beyond as it avoided slow grade crossings in Malden and Wakefield. It still connects to the Western Route at Wilmington Junction and runs parallel to it for half a mile.

The name "Wildcat" was used for the branch at least as early as 1911.

=== Cutbacks ===
On June 14, 1959, the B&M introduced a series of service cutbacks, including the abandonment of the north half of the Woburn Loop. The Western Route was abandoned from Reading to Wilmington Junction; all service to Haverhill and beyond was rerouted via the Wilmington Branch. North Wilmington on the Western Route was replaced with Salem Street station, the first station ever built on the Wilmington Branch. When the newly formed MBTA began funding B&M commuter service in January 1965, state subsidies were provided only for service to Reading on the Western Route and Wilmington on the Lowell Line; local governments were required to fund out-of-district service. Salem Street was closed on June 30, 1967, as the B&M cut all service on the line except for a single round trip to Haverhill. That single trip was cut in June 1976.

=== Modern service ===
The MBTA bought the B&M commuter rail assets, including the Wildcat Branch, on December 27, 1976. The Reading line was re-extended to Haverhill as the Haverhill/Reading Line on December 17, 1979. Most trains on the line use the Western Route via Reading; however, the line south of Reading is single-tracked in many locations due to the 1970s construction of the Haymarket North Extension of the MBTA Orange Line subway and has numerous grade crossings, so some express trips run via the Wildcat and the lower Lowell Line. Amtrak Downeaster service to Maine began on December 14, 2001; all Downeaster service uses the Wildcat except during service disruptions such as construction.

Regular MBTA service via the Wildcat Branch ran until December 2020 and resumed in April 2021. From September 9 to November 5, 2023, all outer Haverhill Line service was routed over the Wildcat Branch during signal work on the inner part of the Haverhill Line. Beginning May 20, 2024, weekday midday inbound trains were again temporarily routed over the Wildcat Branch during construction work. As of 2025, two Haverhill Line trains operate over the Wildcat Branch each weekday: one inbound train in the morning and one outbound train in the evening. These trains run express between North Station and Ballardvale and do not stop at any Lowell Line stations.

The line also carries some freight service by CSX Transportation (formerly Pan Am Railways), primarily the train "DOBO" (Dover, New Hampshire, to Boston), which mainly hauls sand and gravel from the New Hampshire Northcoast railroad to the Boston Sand and Gravel facility in Somerville.

== See also ==
- Central Branch, a similar branch connecting two parts of the Long Island Rail Road
