= B&L =

B&L may refer to:

- Boston and Lowell Railroad, a railroad line of the MBTA Commuter Rail system in Massachusetts, United States
- Bausch & Lomb, an American company specializing in optical applications, including corrective lenses
