= Anderson Regional Transportation Center =

Transit station in Woburn, Massachusetts, US

Anderson RTC
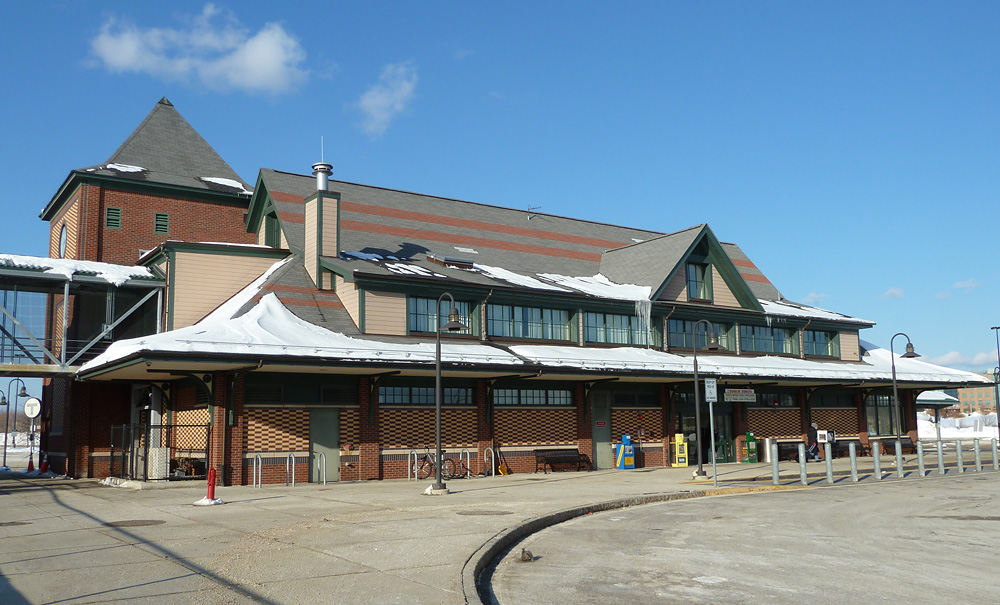
- Anderson RTC in January 2011

General information
- Location: 100 Atlantic Avenue; Woburn, Massachusetts; United States
- Coordinates: 42.5174°N 71.144°W
- Owner: Massport
- Line: New Hampshire Main Line
- Platforms: 1 island platform
- Tracks: 3
- Connections: Logan Express

Construction
- Parking: 880 spaces (Logan Express); 1,200 spaces (MBTA/Amtrak)
- Cycle facilities: No
- Accessible: Yes

Other information
- Station code: Amtrak: WOB
- Fare zone: 2 (MBTA)

History
- Opened: April 8, 2001 (bus); April 28, 2001 (rail)

Passengers
- 2024: 677 daily boardings (MBTA)
- FY 2025: 17,708 annually (Amtrak)

Services
Preceding station	Amtrak	Following station
Haverhill toward Brunswick	Downeaster	Boston North Terminus
Preceding station	MBTA	Following station
Wilmington toward Lowell	Lowell Line	Mishawum toward North Station
Former services
Preceding station	MBTA	Following station
Wilmington toward Haverhill	Haverhill Line limited service	Winchester Center toward North Station
Former services (South Wilmington station)
Preceding station	Boston and Maine Railroad	Following station
Wilmington toward Concord, NH	Boston – Concord, NH	Mishawum toward Boston
Location

Anderson Regional Transportation Center (RTC) (noted on MBTA schedules and maps as Anderson/Woburn, and on Amtrak schedules and maps as Woburn–Anderson) is a train and bus station located at 100 Atlantic Avenue, off Commerce Way, in Woburn, Massachusetts, a suburb of Boston. It can be accessed from Exit 30 off Interstate 93 or Exit 54 (Washington Street) from southbound Interstate 95/Route 128.

It opened on April 28, 2001, replacing nearby Mishawum as Woburn's main Amtrak and MBTA station. It was named in memory of James R. "Jimmy" Anderson (1968–1981), whose death led to the Woburn Wells court case (Anderson v. Cryovac) chronicled in the book, and film, A Civil Action.

== History ==
=== Planning and opening ===
A station at South Wilmington was previously open until June 14, 1959.

The modern station and the surrounding commercial-industrial area was redeveloped from the Industri-Plex Superfund site. The site is a former chemical and glue manufacturing facility. Industri-Plex was used for manufacturing chemicals such as lead-arsenic insecticides, acetic acid, and sulfuric acid for local textile, leather, and paper manufacturing industries from 1853 to 1931. Chemicals manufactured by other industries at the site include phenol, benzene, and toluene. Industri-Plex was also used to manufacture glue from raw animal hide and chrome-tanned hide wastes from 1934 to 1969. The by-products and residues from these industries caused the soils within the site to become contaminated with elevated levels of metals, such as arsenic, lead, and chrome.

During the 1970s, the site was redeveloped for industrial use. Excavations uncovered and mixed industrial by-products and wastes accumulated over 130 years. During this period, residues from animal hide wastes used in the manufacture of glue were relocated on-site from buried pits to piles near swampy areas on the property. Many of the animal hide piles and lagoons on-site were leaching toxic metals into the environment. In the 1980s, the site contained streams and ponds, a warehouse and office buildings, remnant manufacturing buildings, and hide waste deposits buried on the site. The site was cleaned up using the capping technique, in which an impermeable layer seals the top of the hazardous waste site, preventing further pollution.

The station was originally to be called MetroNorth Center after the surrounding development. A groundbreaking ceremony for the station was held in April 2000. Logan Express service moved from Mishawum to Anderson RTC on April 8, 2001, three weeks ahead of rail service. Rail service began on April 28. The new station had 2,400 parking spaces. Dedicated Logan Express parking doubled to 900 spaces, while MBTA parking increased from 600 to 1,100 spaces.

=== Later changes ===
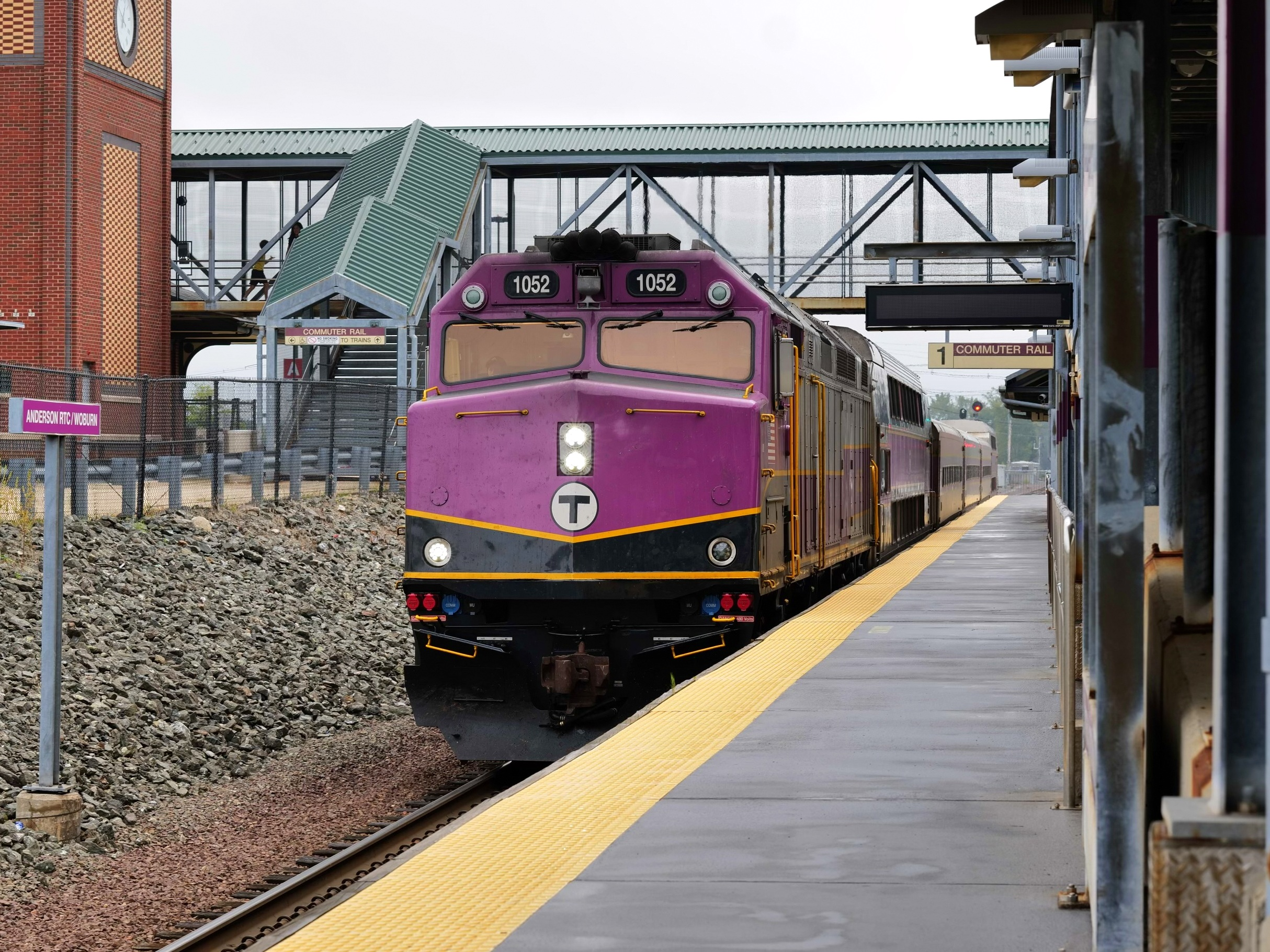
An outbound train at Anderson RTC in 2023

In October 2006, the MBTA added four short turn round trips that terminated at Anderson RTC. By 2012, the parking lot was still underused. In June 2022, the MBTA indicated it was considering improvements to a siding in Woburn, which would have allowed 30-minute headways between Boston and Anderson/Woburn by 2024.

Until December 2020, a small number of Haverhill Line trains ran via the Wildcat Branch and the inner Lowell Line, making stops including Anderson/Woburn. This routing was resumed in April 2021, with the trains no longer making the intermediate stops. From September 9 to November 5, 2023, all outer Haverhill Line service was routed over the Wildcat Branch during signal work on the inner part of the Haverhill Line. The diverted trains stopped at Anderson/Woburn, with connecting shuttle buses operating to Reading. Beginning May 20, 2024, weekday midday inbound Haverhill Line trains were again temporarily routed over the Wildcat Branch during construction work, again stopping only at Anderson/Woburn.

In February 2025, a joint venture of MassDOT, Massport, and the MBTA began looking for a developer for mixed-use transit-oriented development at the station. They released a request for proposals that December. The Massport Board approved a proposal in November 2026. It would include two buildings with 595 apartments and 595 garage parking spaces replacing the northern 6 acres (2.4 ha) of the parking lots. The buildings were expected to be completed in 2031.

== Connections ==
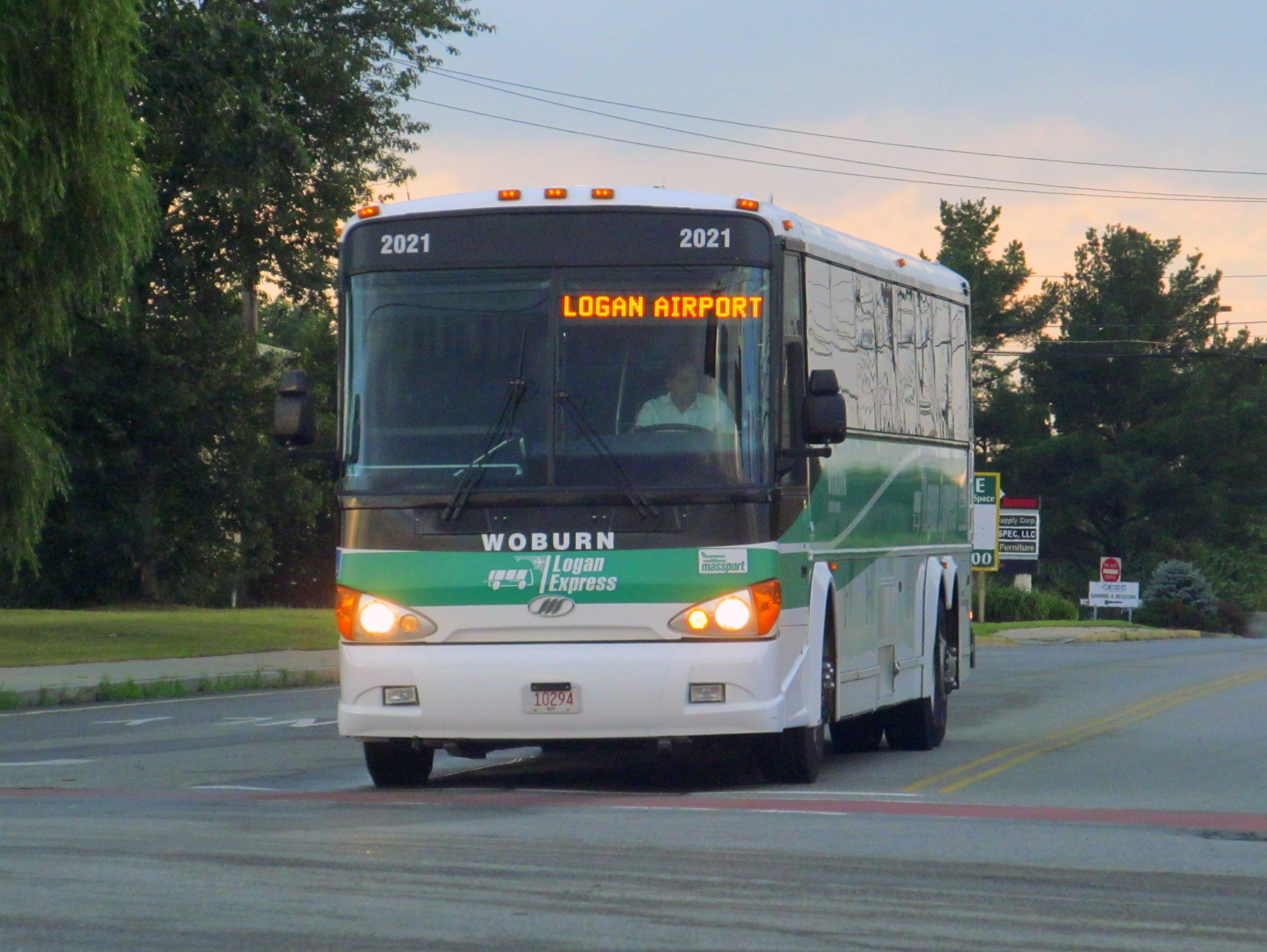
A Logan Express bus leaving the station in 2015

Massport operates Logan Express bus service from the station directly to Logan Airport terminals, with service on hourly or half-hourly headways except late at night.

Several other connecting services have previously been run. Beginning in June 2005, the Route 128 Business Council ran a "Metro North Shuttle" from the station to Lahey Hospital & Medical Center and a business center in Woburn. The service was discontinued in July 2006 due to poor ridership and a loss of state funding. In November 2006, the Manchester-Boston Regional Airport began a shuttle service between the airport and Anderson station, free to ticketed airline passengers. The shuttle, part of a strategy to expand Manchester's visibility as a less crowded alternative to Logan Airport, was replaced with a non-free private shuttle to downtown Boston at the end of June 2008.

There are separate parking lots for overnight parking and for commuter rail (day-only) parking. The overnight lot is intended for airport and Amtrak customers and is more expensive. The Massport lot has 875 spaces and the MBTA lot has 1,500 spaces.
