= Mishawum station =

Former train station in Woburn, Massachusetts, US

Mishawum
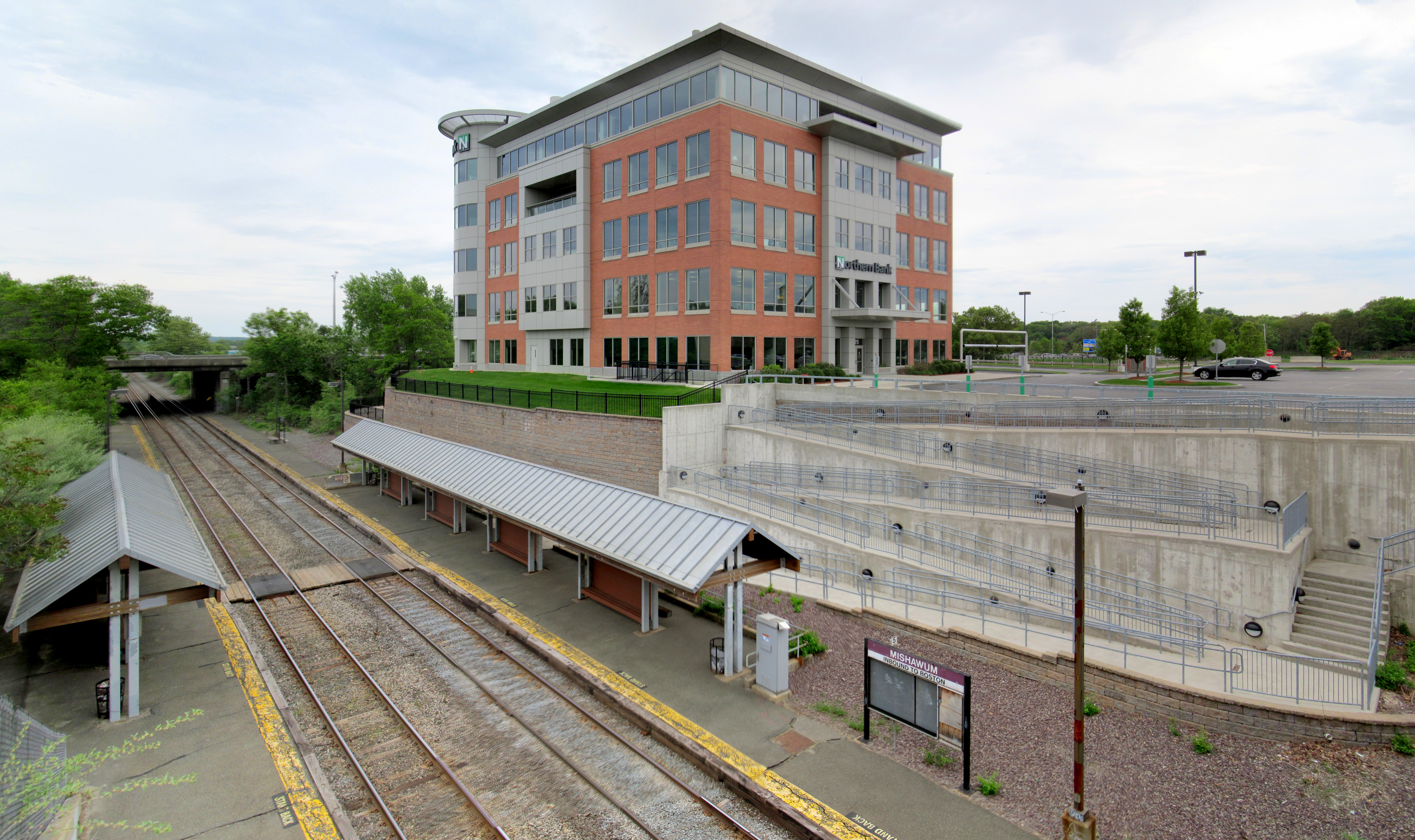
- Mishawum station and associated development in May 2014

General information
- Location: 250 Mishawum Road; Woburn, Massachusetts
- Coordinates: 42.50309°N 71.13699°W
- Line: New Hampshire Main Line
- Platforms: 2 side platforms
- Tracks: 2

Construction
- Accessible: No

Other information
- Fare zone: 2

History
- Opened: c. 1840s; September 24, 1984
- Closed: c. 1950; December 14, 2020
- Rebuilt: 1989–1991; 2008–2010
- Former names: North Woburn (until c. 1885)

Passengers
- 2018: 32 daily boardings

Services
Preceding station	MBTA	Following station
Anderson/Woburn toward Lowell	Lowell Line limited service	Winchester Center toward North Station
Former services
Preceding station	Boston and Maine Railroad	Following station
South Wilmington toward Concord, NH	Boston – Concord, NH	Walnut Hill toward Boston
Location

Mishawum station is an indefinitely-closed MBTA Commuter Rail Lowell Line station located in the north part of Woburn, Massachusetts just north of the Route 128/I-95 beltway. The station has two side platforms serving the line's two tracks. Mishawum is a limited-service flag stop intended for reverse commuting to the adjacent office park, with no weekend service. With just 32 boardings on an average weekday in 2018, Mishawum was one of the least busy stations on the commuter rail system.

The Boston and Lowell Railroad opened in 1835, with a North Woburn station opened by midcentury. It was renamed Mishawum around 1885 when the Woburn Loop opened with its own North Woburn station. Served by only a handful of daily trains during the 20th century, the station closed around 1950. The Massachusetts Bay Transportation Authority (MBTA), which took over Boston commuter rail service in the 1960s, opened a park and ride station at Mishawum in 1984. A 1989–1991 renovation made the station accessible, and Logan Express bus service began in 1992. It was replaced by Anderson Regional Transportation Center in 2001 and service was reduced to three daily round trips; the station has not been accessible since around 2007. An adjacent office building opened as transit-oriented development around 2010, but a planned apartment complex was not built. The station has been closed since December 14, 2020, when reduced schedules were introduced during the COVID-19 pandemic.

== Station design ==
Mishawum station is located in the north part of Woburn, just north of the Route 128/I-95 beltway. The station has two side platforms serving the two tracks of the New Hampshire Main Line. The platforms, located in a cut, run north from near the 128/95 overpass and pass under Mishawum Road. At the north end of the platform are mini-high platforms; they are missing their platform edges, so the station is not accessible. A pedestrian level crossing connects the two platforms. A switchback ramp structure leads from the west (inbound) platform to an at-grade parking lot, which primarily serves an adjacent commercial development.

== History ==
=== Former station ===
When the Boston and Lowell Railroad (B&L) opened in 1835, passenger service operated express between its two endpoints. Over the next several decades, a number of local stops were opened – often several in each town. North Woburn station was opened at Middle Street in the village of New Boston by the 1850s. On November 30, 1885, the Woburn Branch was extended north from Woburn to reconnect with the mainline at North Woburn Junction in South Wilmington. This new Woburn Loop had its own North Woburn station in the village center. Middle Street and the mainline station were soon renamed Mishawum, after the native name for what is now Charlestown (of which Woburn was originally part). The B&L was acquired by the rival Boston and Maine Railroad (B&M) in 1887.

Most local trains were rerouted over the new Woburn Loop. Mishawum station was a flag stop served by just three northbound and five southbound trains by 1917. It was served by one northbound and three southbound trains in 1929; by that time, only a small wooden shelter was available for passengers. Service to Mishawum was further reduced to one trip in each direction by 1946, and the station was abandoned entirely by 1952.

=== MBTA station ===
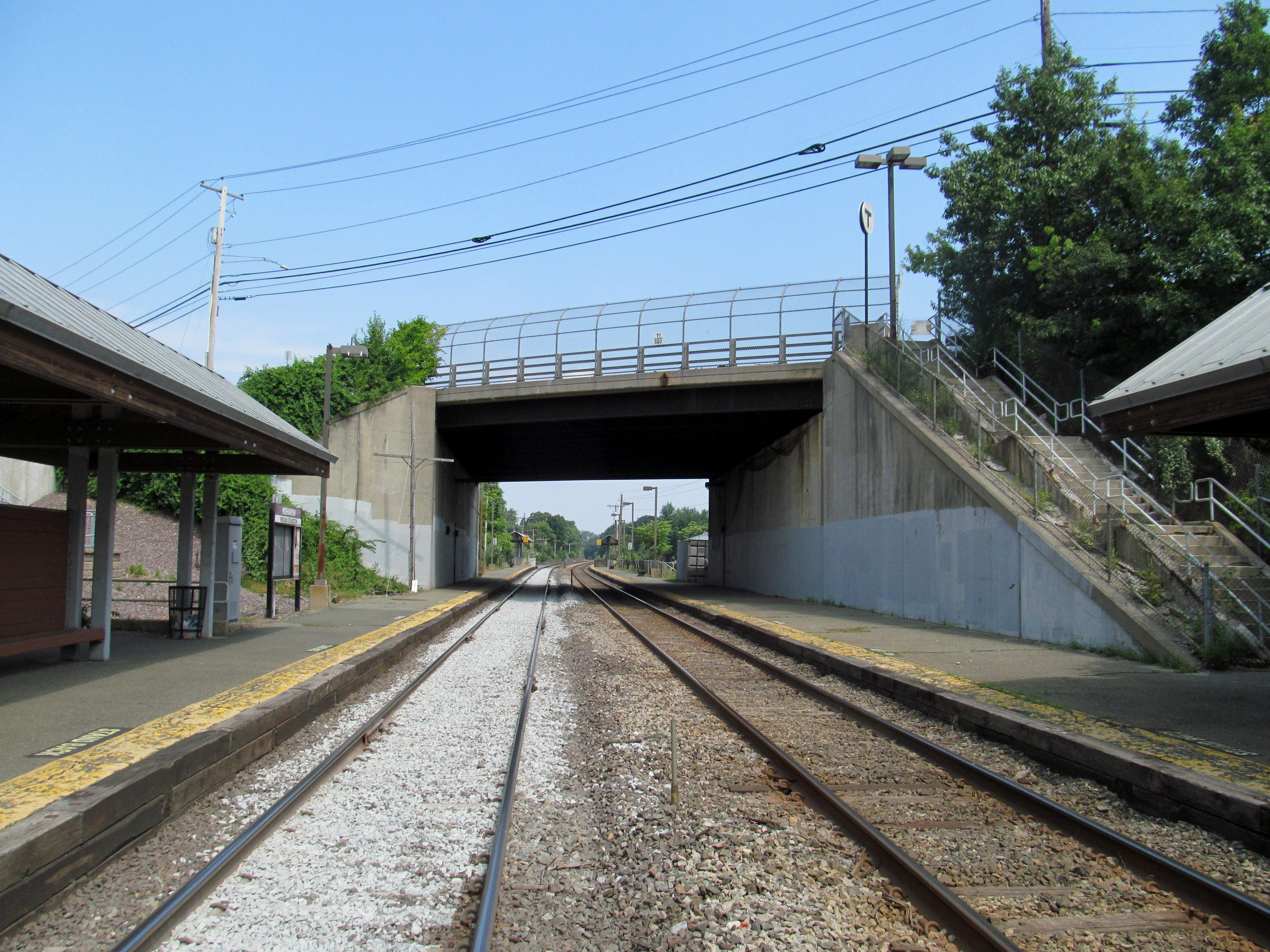
The modern Mishawum station opened in 1984.

The northern part of the Woburn Loop, including North Woburn station, closed on June 14, 1959. The Massachusetts Bay Transportation Authority (MBTA) was formed in 1964 to subsidize suburban commuter rail service, with the ex-B&L becoming its Lowell Line. The MBTA ended remaining Woburn Branch service on January 30, 1981. This left Woburn without any commuter rail stations save for Lechmere Warehouse station, a private station serving an industrial park.

By that time, a new station to serve Woburn was under development. In July 1978, the MBTA purchased an industrial site on the south side of Mishawum Road for a reported $560,000 for use as a park and ride station. Contamination from improperly dumped industrial waste was an issue at many sites in Woburn; 187 55-gallon drums of polyurethane resin were discovered at the station site during construction in 1979. The station appeared under several names on systems maps prior to opening: "Mishawum Park" in 1978, and "Mishawum Park-128" in 1980.

Mishawum station ultimately opened on September 24, 1984 – the first new station on the system since West Natick station, which opened in 1982. A 250-space parking lot on the west side of the station served Woburn residents and drivers from the Route 128/I-95 and I-93 expressways. By June 1985, the MBTA planned to add 500 additional spaces; this was soon scaled down to 250 additional spaces. The station was not originally accessible. With the pending passage of the Americans with Disabilities Act, the MBTA announced a $1.1 million renovation of the station on September 29, 1989. The project, which included mini-high platforms for accessibility and the 250-space parking lot expansion, was completed on May 17, 1991.

On November 16, 1992, Peter Pan Bus Lines began operating Logan Express bus service from Mishawum to Logan Airport via I-93 under contract to Massport, following the success of similar services running from Braintree and Shopper's World in Framingham. A waiting room and expanded parking lot were soon built for Logan Express passengers. The route was taken over by Paul Revere Transportation in November 1995. In September 1998, the MBTA introduced route 355 MBTA bus service, with two daily round trips between Mishawum and downtown Boston.

=== Replacement and continued usage ===
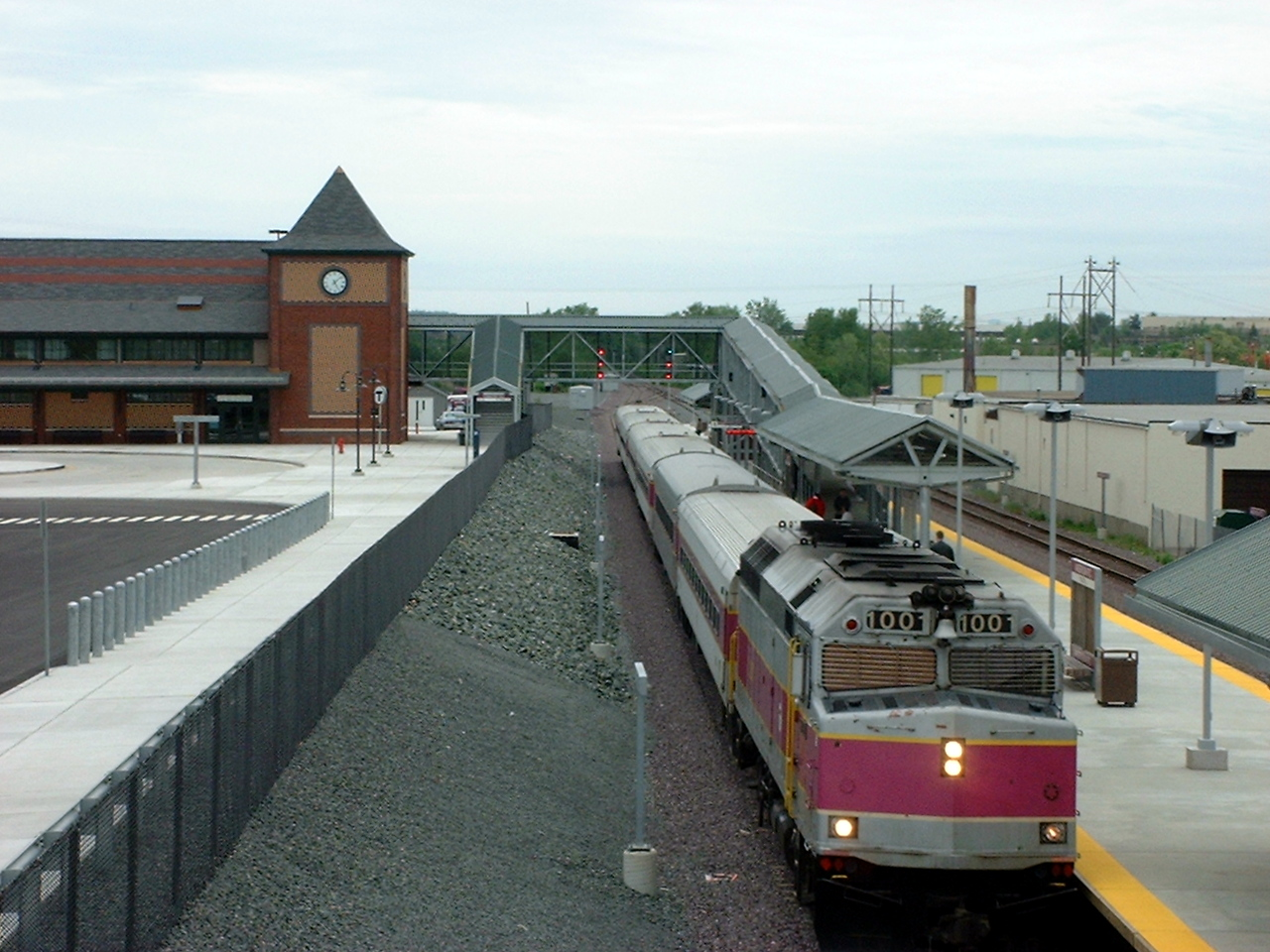
Mishawum was largely replaced by the more modern Anderson RTC in 2001

In the late 1990s, the city of Woburn began redevelopment of the Industri-Plex Superfund site north of Mishawum Road. The redevelopment included an office park, an interchange with I-93, and a regional transportation center. Built to serve MBTA Commuter Rail, Logan Express, and Amtrak Downeaster service, the Anderson Regional Transportation Center (RTC) had 2,400 parking spaces to replace the 600 at Mishawum. Located 1 mile (1.6 km) north of Mishawum, it had direct access to I-93 via the new interchange and a larger station building for bus and train passengers. Logan Express service shifted to Anderson RTC effective April 8, 2001; full commuter rail service followed on April 28.

The MBTA originally intended to close Mishawum after Anderson RTC opened. However, Anderson RTC is further from the commercial and residential center of Woburn, and local officials and business owners desired to retain the stop. After pressure from local politicians, the MBTA agreed to keep Mishawum open as a limited-service reverse commute stop for workers who live in Boston. A bill in the state legislature to study reestablishing Mishawum as a full-time stop died in committee in 2002 and 2003.

During the 2004 Democratic National Convention held at the Fleet Center, commuter rail service was not operated into North Station due to security concerns about North Station's location under the arena. Lowell Line service operated only to West Medford, with bus service operated from several stations to downtown Boston The parking area at Mishawum was reopened for one week, with express buses (numbered as the normally unused route 53) running directly to South Station.

=== Development and renovations ===
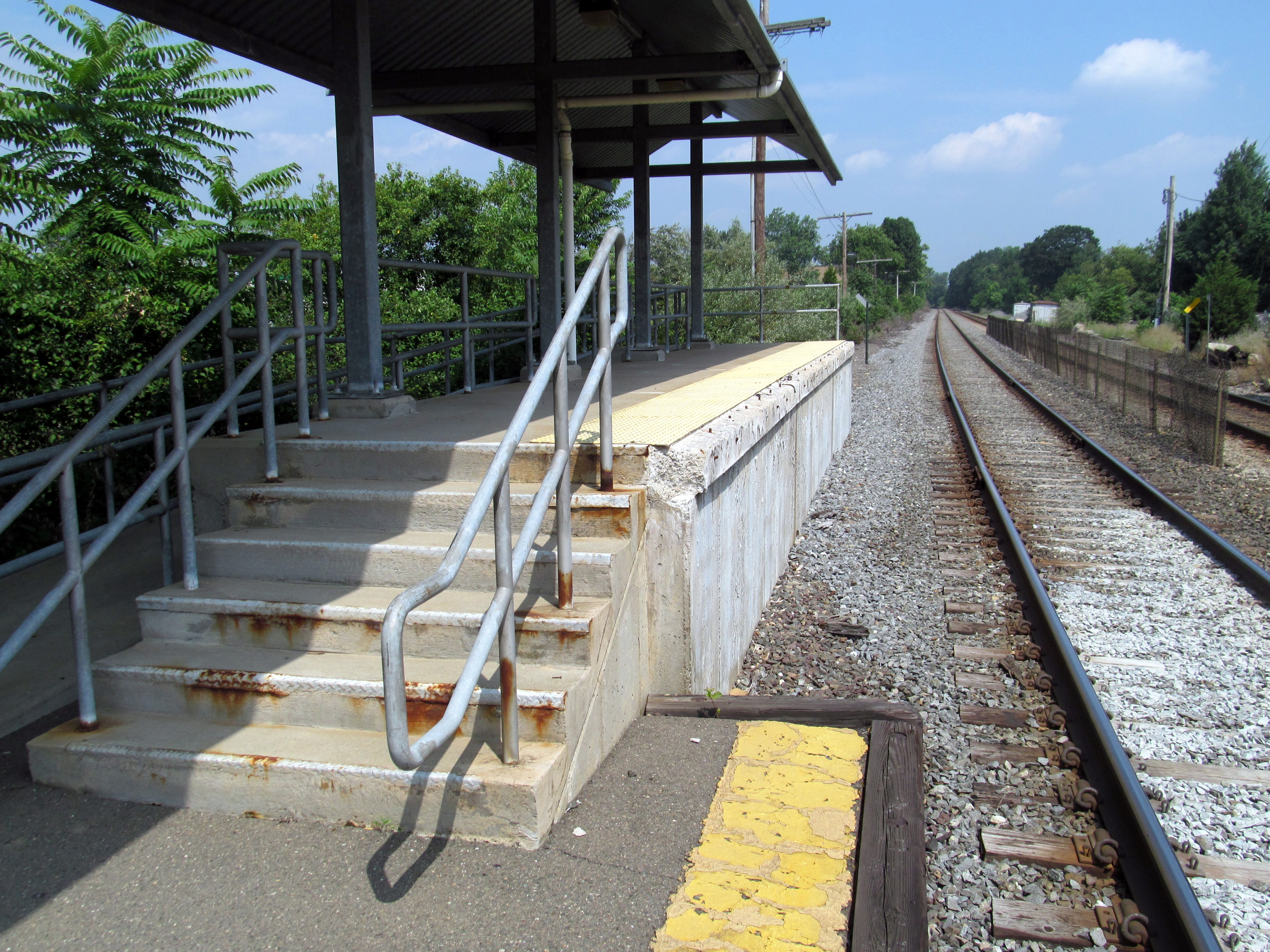
The inbound mini-high platform with missing edge strip in 2013.

The MBTA began planning for transit-oriented development around Mishawum station even before its 1984 opening. In 2004, the MBTA proposed a mixed-use development on the former parking lot with a fire station, residential units, and a hotel, but zoning for the plan was rejected by Woburn City Council due to concerns about increased density in the primarily suburban city. In July 2005, two developers bought the 7-acre site from the MBTA for $7.2 million. In August 2006, the City Council approved the parcel as a "transit oriented development overlay district" allowing the construction of apartment buildings up to 7 stories high, in addition to other possible uses.

The Council approved a 210-apartment building and a 50,000 square foot office building with a below-ground garage in January 2007. Although local opinion favored a smaller residential building, 210 units was considered the minimum number to bring restoration of Mishawum as a full-time station into consideration. Environmental approval was granted two months later.

Construction of the office building also included a large ramp structure leading to the inbound platform to replace the old ramp. The office building, garage, and ramp were completed around 2010, but the apartment complex was delayed and ultimately never built. However, the outbound stairs and the south ends of the platform were never renovated and are closed off. The mini-high platform edges that were removed around 2007 to repair another station were not replaced, making the station no longer accessible. Bus route 355 was discontinued in July 2012 as part of general service cutbacks due to the MBTA's financial state, leaving Mishawum with no remaining bus connections. The abandoned Logan Express building was demolished in 2014 for the construction of a Dave and Busters, which opened in 2015.

With just 32 boardings on an average weekday in 2018, Mishawum is one of the least busy stations on the commuter rail system. Prior to the COVID-19 pandemic, weekday service to Mishawum consisted of three outbound trains during the morning rush hour and three inbound trains during the evening rush hour, with no weekend service. This was the same level of service the station had since 2001. Temporary reduced schedules based on existing Saturday schedules were in effect from March 16 to June 23, 2020. These schedules did not include Mishawum and five other limited-service stations not normally served on Saturdays. Temporary reduced schedules again went into effect on December 14, 2020, with Mishawum and four other stations not served.
