= North Wilmington, Massachusetts =

Coordinates: 42°34′10″N 71°09′23″W

North Wilmington
- Populated place
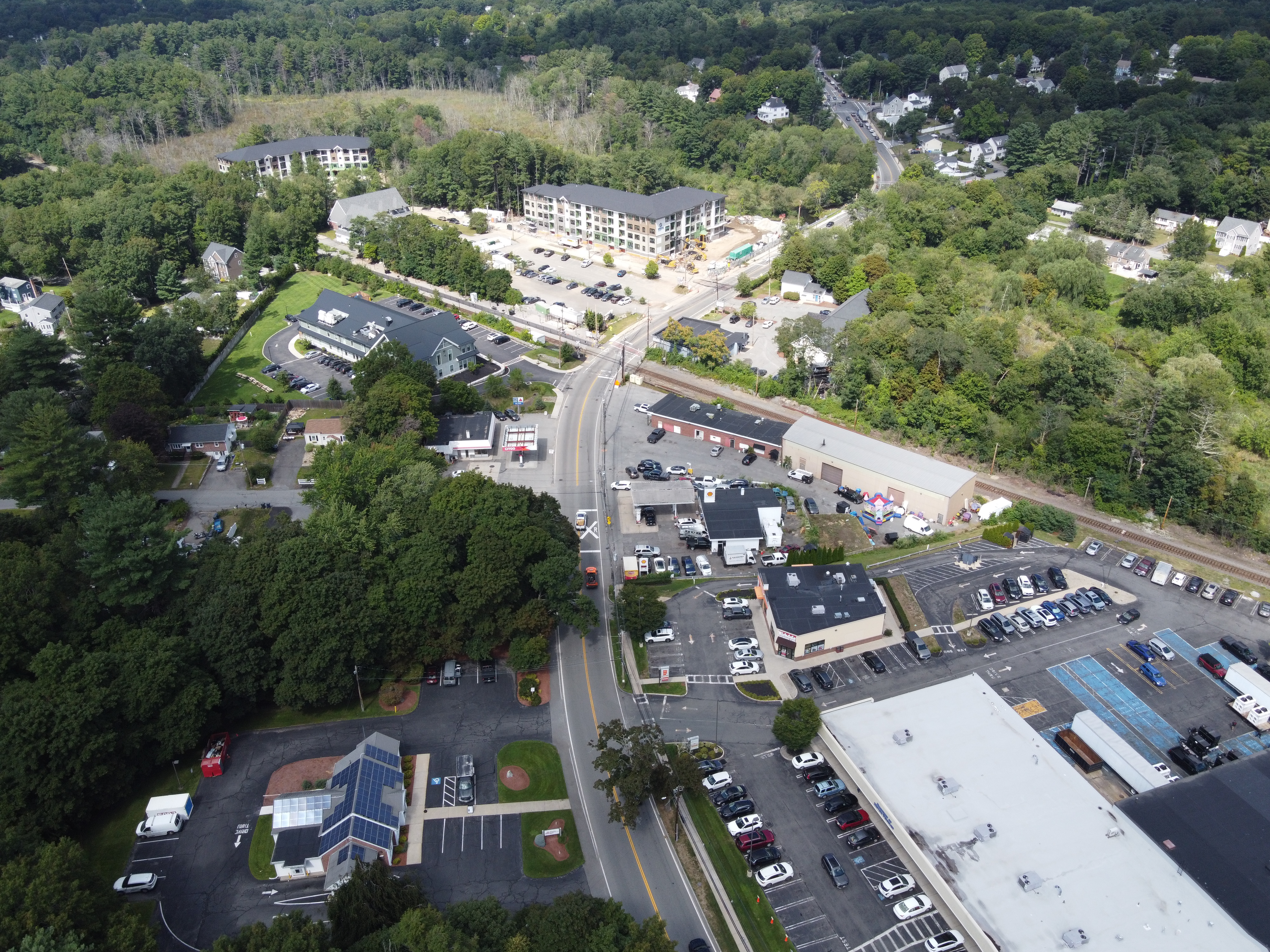
- North Wilmington from above
- Nickname: "North Wilmy"
- Interactive map of North Wilmington
- Country: United States
- State: Massachusetts
- County: Middlesex
- Town: Wilmington
- ZIP Code: 01887
- Area code: 978

North Wilmington is an unincorporated village and populated place in Wilmington, Massachusetts. North Wilmington consists of much of the northern and eastern half of the town.

The center of North Wilmington contains the village's MBTA Commuter Rail station, North Wilmington station, alongside a Massachusetts Registrar of Motor Vehicles location and several other attractions along Route 62.
