= Lowell and Lawrence Railroad =

Map

The Lowell and Lawrence Railroad was a small independent railroad that was chartered in 1846 to build a rail line linking the two giant Merrimack River Valley cities of Lowell, Massachusetts to Lawrence, Massachusetts.

== Early history ==
Originally, the line was going to be built along the Merrimack River, but the residents of Tewksbury, upset that they had been bypassed by both the Boston and Lowell Railroad and the Boston and Maine Railroad requested that the new line come through their town.

Construction began in 1846 and passed through Tewksbury and West Andover and met the B&M main line in South Lawrence. The line opened in 1848 and began running both freight and passenger service between the two cities. Passengers could access Boston by either connecting to the B&M in Lawrence or the B&L in Lowell.

The year the L&L opened, the Salem and Lowell Railroad was chartered and its line was built from Peabody to the L&L's line just a little over a mile east of Tewksbury Center. The S&L was ready for business in 1850 and the L&L ran the line under contract. The meeting of the two lines was a Wye that the two lines gave three different names to. The north point of the Wye was called Lawrence Jct; the west point was called Tewksbury Jct and the south point was called Salem Jct. By the time the two lines fell under control of the Boston and Lowell, the entire Wye was called Tewksbury Jct.

== B&M control of operations ==
In 1852, the L&L allowed the B&M to run passenger service from Wilmington Jct to Lowell along the two lines in defiance of the monopoly owned by the B&L for all rail service between Lowell and Boston. B&L filed suit in 1855 and won in court. Because of this violation, the B&L acquired the L&L and took over operation in 1858.

By the time that the B&M took over control of the B&L in 1887, the Lowell and Lawrence was obsolete. The B&M had built its own branch line to Lowell in 1874, after the B&L's monopoly ran out in 1865, and it closely paralleled the L&L's main line, meaning it was not worthwhile for the B&M to maintain two line between Lowell and Lawrence. The B&M ran some passenger service over the line until 1924 and then slowly started to abandon the line. First from Pikes Siding in South Lawrence to Tewksbury Jct in 1926. Then Tewksbury Jct to Tewksbury Center later that year when the B&M abandoned the Salem & Lowell from Tewksbury Jct to Wilmington Jct.

Between 1895 and 1900, service ended on the line from its start at the Bleachery in Lowell to Wamesit in Tewksbury where the B&M and the L&L shared a station. This stretch of track was not, however, legally abandoned until 1936. The tracks were removed and the line from Tewksbury Center was directly connected to the B&M's Lowell Branch line. Freight traffic ran from Wamesit to Tewksbury Center until 1979 and then was completely abandoned in 1983.

== Current status ==
The only part of the Lowell and Lawrence still in operation today is at either end of where the lines began and ended. In Lawrence, the first two miles of the line from Lawrence to Pikes Siding is still used as an industrial spur. In Lowell, where the two lines paralleled each other only a half mile apart, the B&M abandoned its line from the Bleachery to the Concord River and built a connecting line to the L&L, keeping the first mile of the line in service. Pan Am Railways still uses this part of the line as its main line through the city of Lowell. A portion of the railbed near Haggetts Pond has been converted into the Haggetts Pond Rail Trail. In May 2025, construction began to pave the trail and add other improvements.

== Sources ==
- Karr, Ronald D. (1994). Lost Railroads New England. Branch Line Press. ISBN 0-942147-04-9.
- Karr, Ronald D. (1995). The Rail Lines of Southern New England - A Handbook of Railroad History. Branch Line Press. ISBN 0-942147-02-2.
