= Wilmington station (MBTA) =

Train station in Wilmington, Massachusetts, US

Wilmington
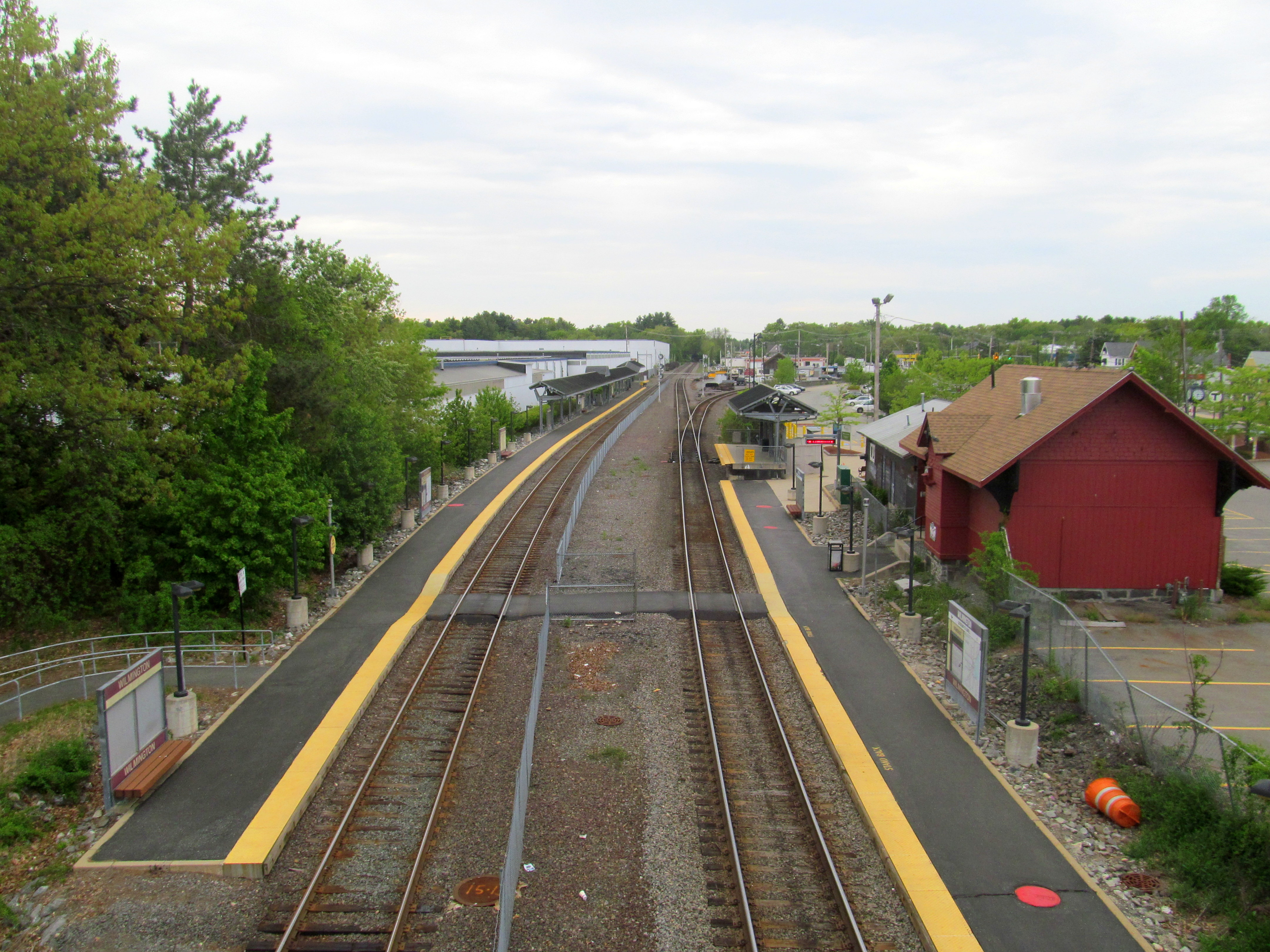
- Wilmington station in April 2016, viewed from the Route 62 overpass

General information
- Location: 405 Main Street (Route 38); Wilmington, Massachusetts
- Coordinates: 42.547°N 71.1747°W
- Lines: New Hampshire Route Main Line; Wildcat Branch
- Platforms: 2 side platforms
- Tracks: 2
- Connections: LRTA: 12, 21

Construction
- Parking: 191 spaces
- Accessible: Yes

Other information
- Fare zone: 3

History
- Opened: c. 1836
- Rebuilt: c. 1887; 2003

Passengers
- 2024: 377 daily boardings

Services
Preceding station	MBTA	Following station
North Billerica toward Lowell	Lowell Line	Anderson/Woburn toward North Station
Former services
Preceding station	MBTA	Following station
Ballardvale toward Haverhill	Haverhill Line Limited service	Anderson/Woburn toward North Station
Preceding station	Boston and Maine Railroad	Following station
Silver Lake toward Concord, NH	Boston – Concord, NH	South Wilmington via mainline toward Boston
Silver Lake toward Concord, NH	Boston – Concord, NH	North Woburn via Woburn Loop toward Boston
Location

Wilmington station is an MBTA Commuter Rail station in Wilmington, Massachusetts served by the Lowell Line. It is located near the intersection of Main Street (Routes 38/129) and Church Street (Route 62) in Wilmington's town center. The station is accessible, with mini-high platforms serving both tracks.

== Station layout and history ==
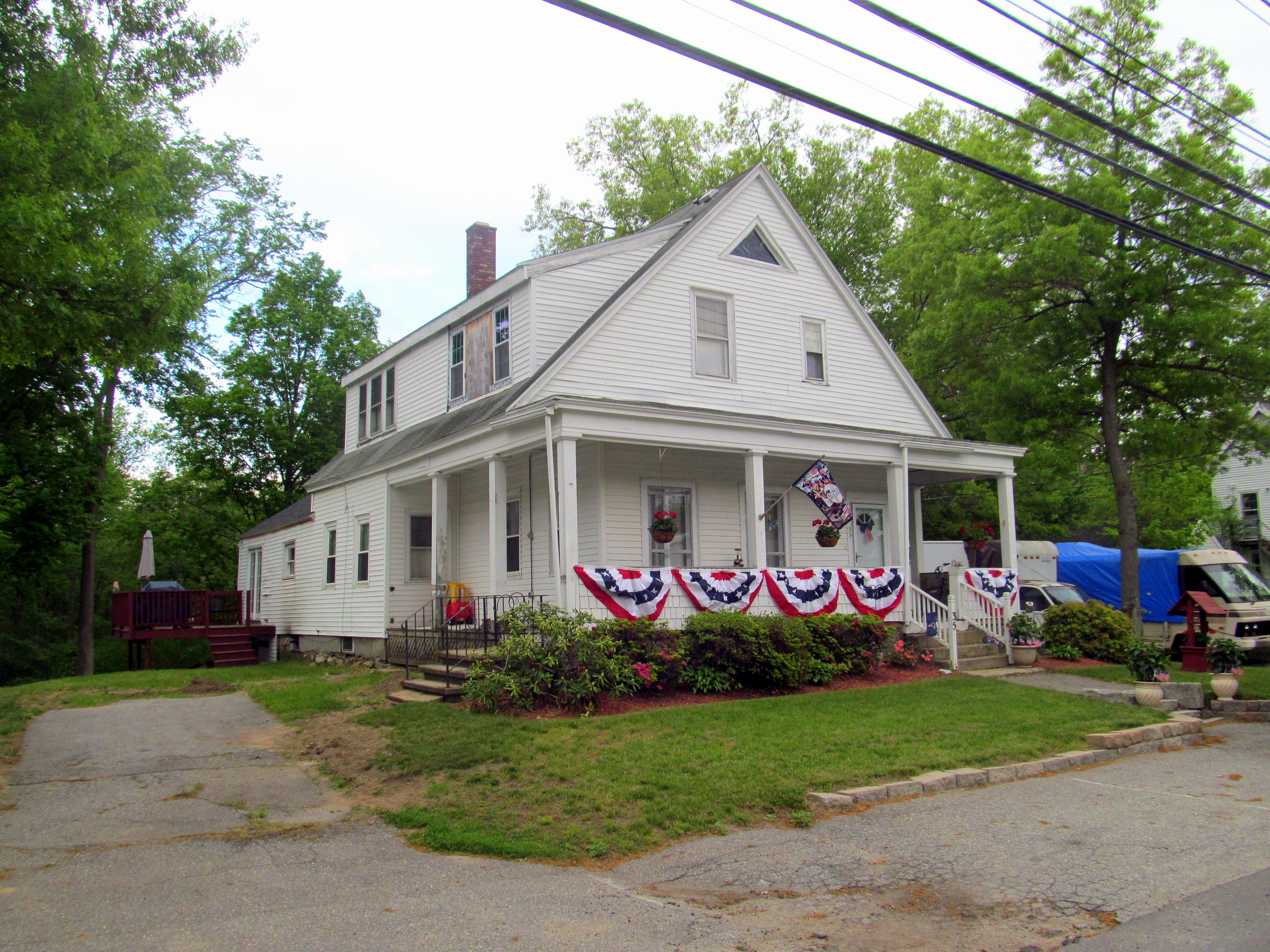
The 1845-built station building in 2016

The Boston and Lowell Railroad originally had no intermediate stations, but Wilmington petitioned for a stop as early as 1836. An early station building was constructed either for the Andover and Wilmington Railroad in 1835 or 1836, or for the B&L and B&M a decade later. It was replaced by a small wooden structure around 1887. Both structures are still extant; the earlier structure was moved east on Church Street in the 1890s and reused as a house. The newer structure remains next to the tracks; it was converted to a pizza restaurant by 1977.

The platforms are staggered; the southbound platform is entirely to the north of the Route 62 overpass, while over half of the northbound platform is south of the bridge. A pedestrian crossing between the two platforms is located just north of the bridge; until a path from an adjacent apartment complex opened in 2015, this was the only access to the southbound platform.

The station formerly had a single small side platform and no MBTA parking lot. In 1998, the MBTA began planning a $5.2 million renovation which included longer accessible platforms and a 227-space parking lot. The project was completed in 2003 at a total cost of $13 million.

The Wildcat Branch, used by Amtrak Downeaster trains and some Haverhill Line express trains, connects with the Lowell Line at Wilmington station. The single-track branch splits from the northbound track just north of the platform. Until December 2020, the small number of Haverhill Line trains using the Wildcat Branch made intermediate stops on the inner Lowell Line. Northbound trains using this routing stopped at Wilmington; southbound trains did not, as the southbound platform cannot be reached from the Wildcat Branch. This routing was resumed in April 2021, with the trains no longer making the intermediate stops.
