= Reading station (MBTA) =

Train station in Reading, Massachusetts, US

Reading
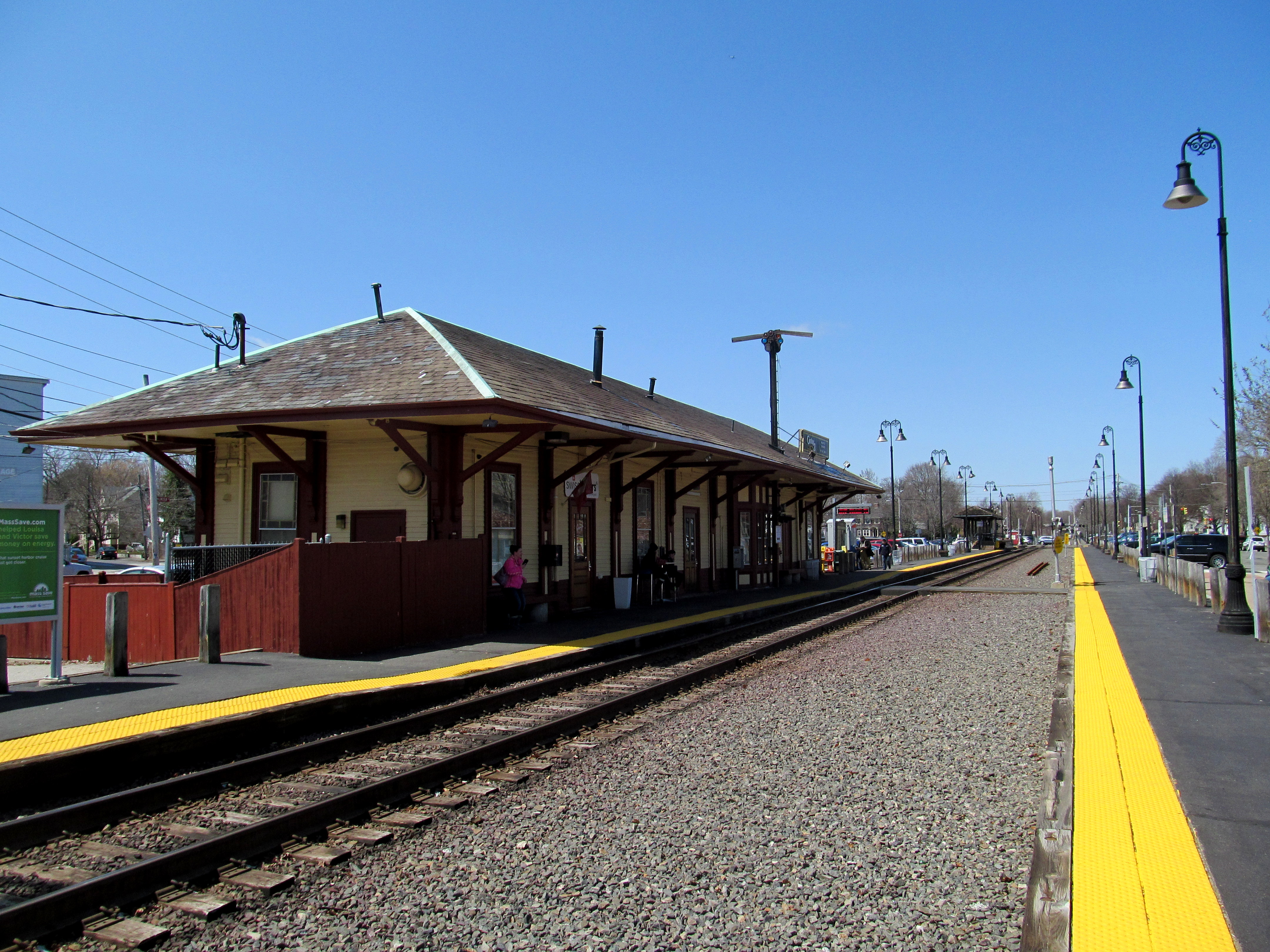
- Reading station in 2014

General information
- Location: 35 Lincoln Street; Reading, Massachusetts
- Coordinates: 42°31′18″N 71°6′27″W
- Line: Western Route
- Platforms: 2 side platforms
- Tracks: 1
- Connections: MBTA bus: 137

Construction
- Parking: Yes
- Cycle facilities: 10 spaces
- Accessible: Yes
- Architectural style: Stick/Eastlake, Queen Anne

Other information
- Fare zone: 2

History
- Opened: 1845
- Rebuilt: 1870, 1991

Passengers
- 2024: 209 daily boardings

Services
Preceding station	MBTA	Following station
Wakefield toward North Station	Haverhill Line	North Wilmington toward Haverhill
Former services
Preceding station	Boston and Maine Railroad	Following station
Wakefield toward Boston	Western Route	Reading Highlands toward Portland
Wakefield toward Boston	Boston – Dover until 1967	North Wilmington toward Dover
Wakefield toward Boston	Boston – Haverhill	North Wilmington toward Haverhill
- Boston and Maine Railroad Depot
- U.S. National Register of Historic Places
- Area: 3 acres (1.2 ha)
- MPS: Reading MRA
- NRHP reference No.: 84002509
- Added to NRHP: July 19, 1984
Location

Reading station is an MBTA Commuter Rail station in Reading, Massachusetts. It serves the Haverhill/Reading Line. It is located at Lincoln and High Streets on the western fringe of Reading's central business district. The station's historic depot building was built in 1870 by the Boston and Maine Railroad. The station was the terminus of the line from 1959 until the re-extension to Haverhill station in 1979.

== History ==
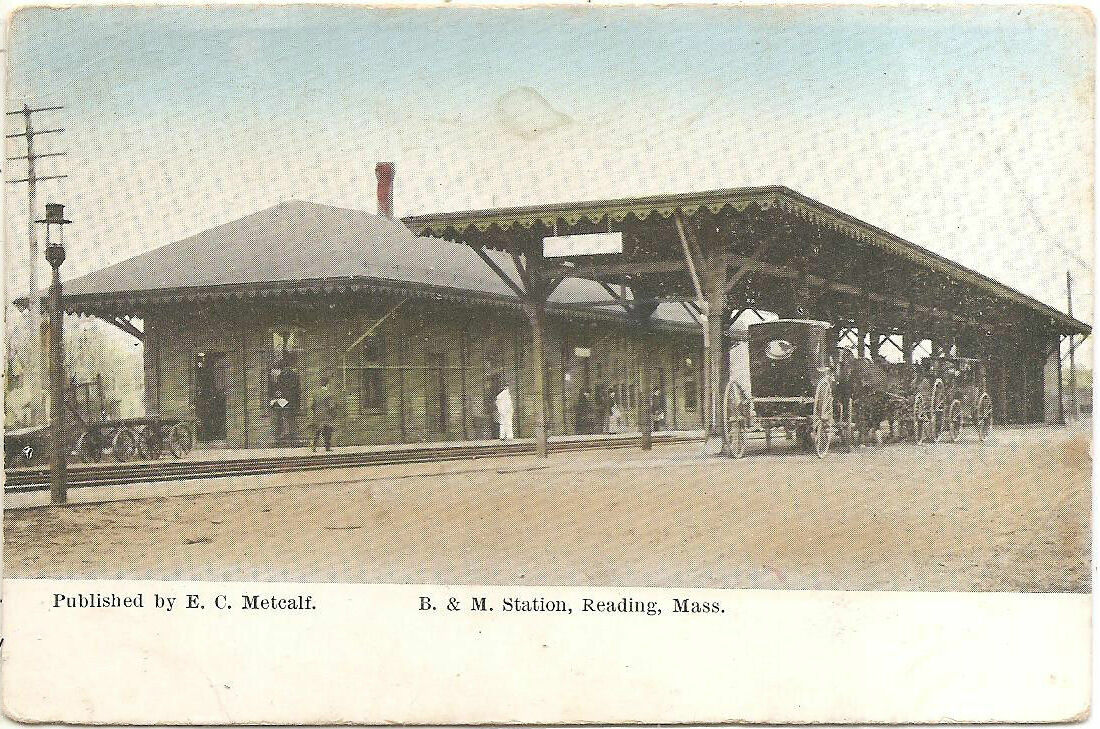
Reading station on an early postcard

The Boston and Maine Railroad Extension from Wilmington Junction to Boston was completed in 1845, with intermediate stops including Reading. A new station building was constructed in 1870. The depot is located southwest of the tracks, at the junction of Lincoln and Prescott Streets. It is a long rectangular building with Queen Anne styling, with paneled pilasters at the corners and between the bays, and large knee braces that help support the wide overhangs of the hip roof. The north (track-facing) facade has seven bays, alternating windows (4) and doors (3). One of the windows is a projecting bay with a band of narrow and tall windows, whose upper sash has colored lights.

The station was purchased by the town in 1960, and was briefly used as a museum of railroad history. The MBTA purchased the Haverhill Line in 1973, intending to replace commuter rail service with extended Orange Line subway service between Oak Grove and Reading. The new Reading/128 terminus would have been located outside the downtown area just south of Route 128, rather than at the current downtown location. Ultimately, the extension was not built past Oak Grove due to rising costs, and commuter rail service was kept on the corridor.

The station building was added to the National Register of Historic Places in 1984. The town sold the building to private owners in 1985, with preservation restrictions. The station was rebuilt in 1990 with a mini-high platform on the inbound side for accessibility. Rail service on the inner Haverhill Line was suspended from September 9 to November 5, 2023, to accommodate signal work. Substitute bus service was operated between Reading and Oak Grove and between Reading and Anderson/Woburn.

=== Future ===
In June 2022, the MBTA indicated plans to add a turnback track at the station at a cost of $1.5–2 million to allow increased frequency. In November 2024, the MBTA submitted a notice of intent (NOI) for the track construction. It would extend 4,500 feet (1,400 m) northwest from the station, effectively restoring the double track that formerly existed. Reading short turn trains would lay over on the new track rather than at the single-track station. This would allow all-day service between Boston and Reading to be increased to every half hour. The MBTA withdrew the NOI in February 2025, but resubmitted it in September 2025 with several changes including screen trees. The MBTA again withdrew the plan in November 2025.

In August 2026, the MBTA received a $139.6 million grant from the Federal Railroad Administration to add 6.8 miles (10.9 km) of double track between Reading and Andover. The project will include reconstruction of Reading and three other stations with accessible mini-high platforms. Construction at Reading was expected to take place in 2029 and 2030.

== See also ==
- National Register of Historic Places listings in Reading, Massachusetts
