= Rotem Commuter Cars =

Series of multi level commuter rail passenger car

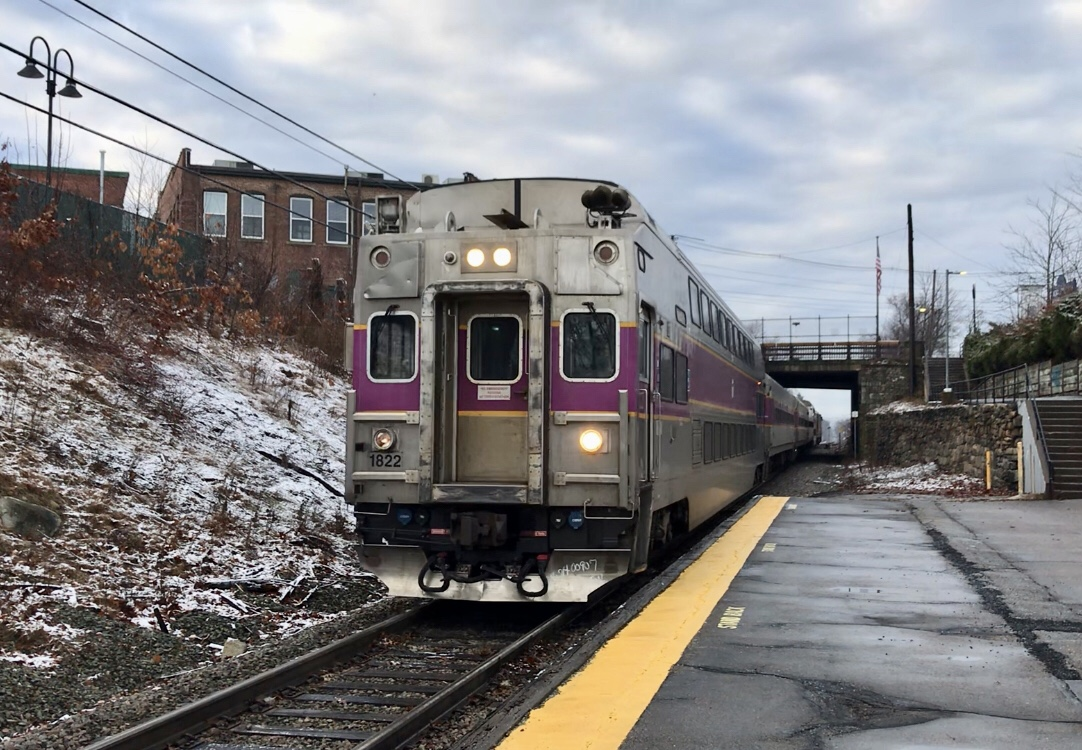
An MBTA Hyundai-Rotem CTC-5 cab car at Franklin station in January 2023

Rotem Commuter Cars are a series of multi-level passenger rail cars for commuter rail operations. They are manufactured by Hyundai Rotem.

Hyundai Rotem began marketing commuter rail cars in 2006 to compete with rail car manufacturers in North America against established manufacturers like Bombardier Transportation and Kawasaki Heavy Industries Rolling Stock Company. An assembly plant opened in Philadelphia, Pennsylvania, in 2008 to meet American requirements; it closed a decade later.

== Types ==
- BTC-5 (Blind Trailer Coach): car coaches with 179 seats and capacity for 225
- CTC-5 (Control Trailer Coach): car coaches with 173 seats and capacity for 215
- Bi-level rail set: rail set consisting of locomotive, coaches and cab car seating 233 passengers and capacity for 337

== Operators ==
- MBTA Commuter Rail: both BTC and CTC cars
- Metrolink: bi-level coach and cab cars
- Tri-Rail: bi-level coach and cab cars (24 total)

== Gallery ==
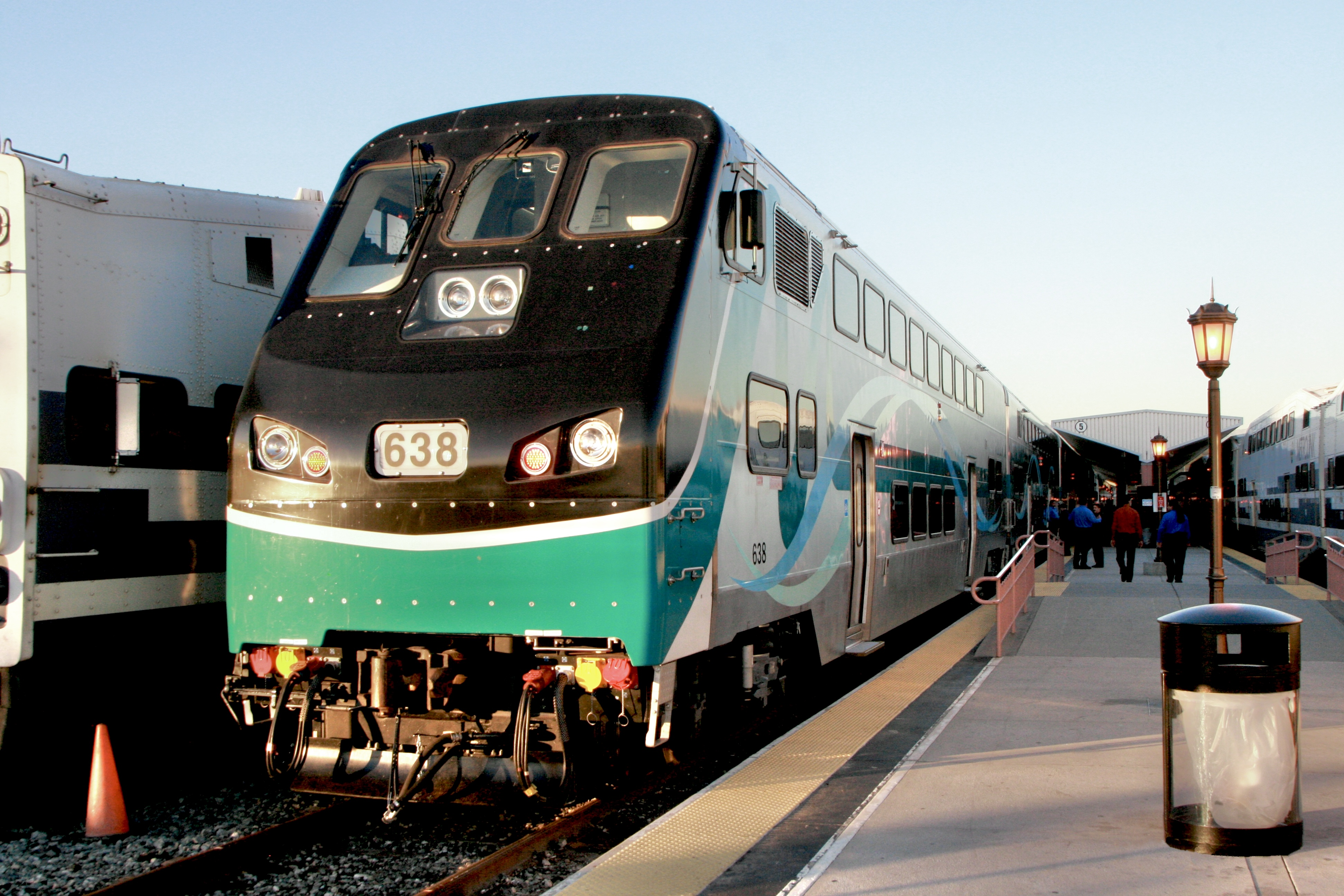
Metrolink Hyundai-Rotem cab car at LAUPT

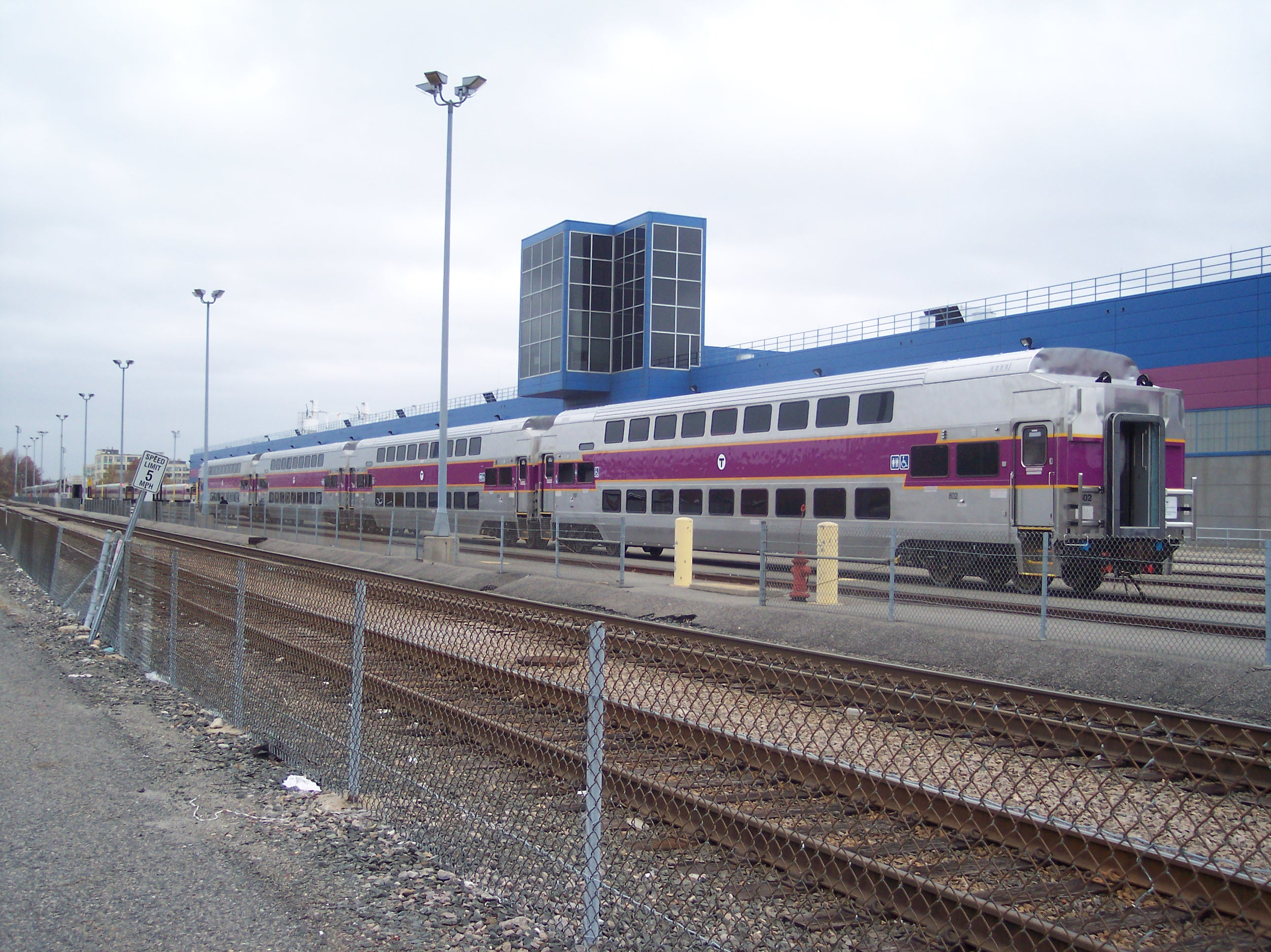
MBTA Hyundai-Rotem BTC (Blind Trailer Car) cars at Boston Engine Terminal

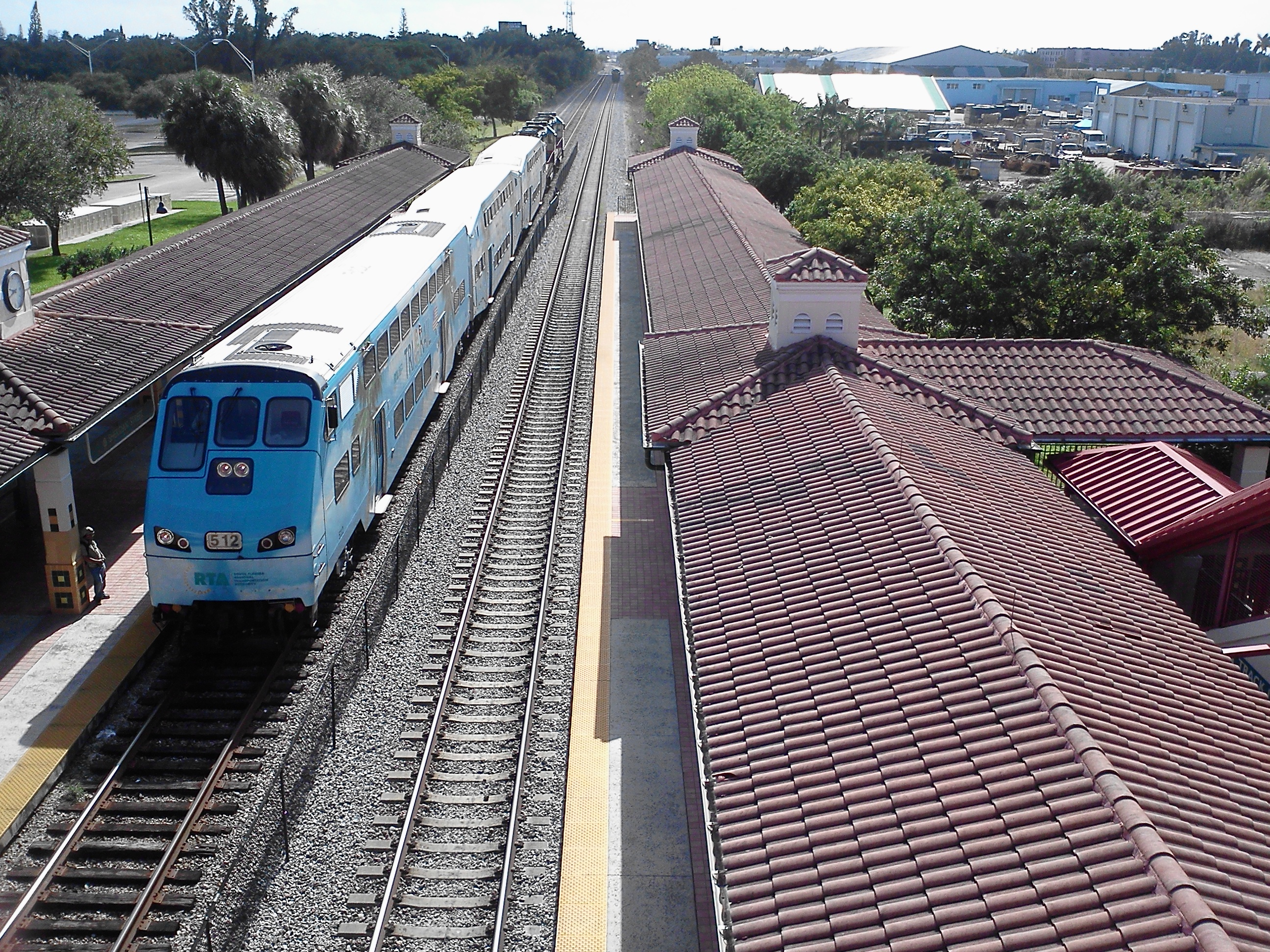
Tri-Rail Cab and Coach Bilevel cars being pushed by 2 GP49H-3s
