= MBTA Commuter Rail =

Greater Boston commuter rail system

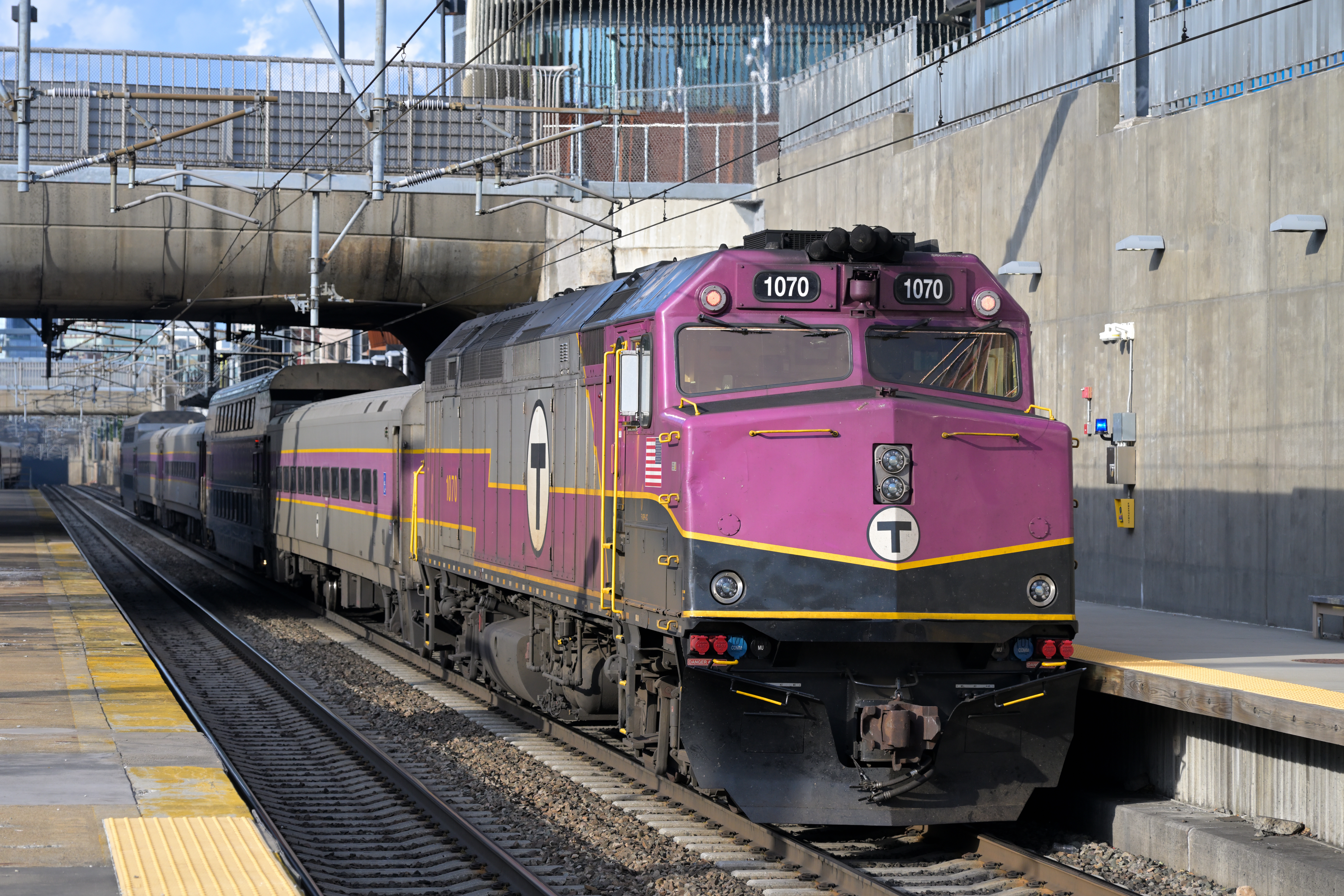
- A Providence/Stoughton Line train at Ruggles in 2025

Overview
- Owner: Massachusetts Bay Transportation Authority (MBTA)
- Locale: Eastern Massachusetts and central Rhode Island
- Transit type: Commuter rail
- Number of lines: 12
- Number of stations: 143 active; 5 currently closed
- Daily ridership: 111,600 (weekdays, Q2 2026)
- Annual ridership: 29,707,200 (2025)
- Website: mbta.com/schedules/commuter-rail

Operation
- Began operation: 1834 (first lines open); 1965 (beginning of MBTA subsidies); 1973 and 1976 (MBTA asset purchases); 1977 (full consolidation)
- Operator: Keolis Commuter Services
- Reporting marks: MBTX
- Number of vehicles: 110 diesel locomotives, 475 coaches

Technical
- System length: 429 mi (690 km)
- Track gauge: 4 ft 8 1/2 in (1,435 mm) standard gauge
- Top speed: 79 mph (127 km/h)
MBTA Commuter Rail system maps

The MBTA Commuter Rail (reporting mark MBTX) system serves as the commuter rail arm of the Massachusetts Bay Transportation Authority's (MBTA's) transportation coverage of Greater Boston in the United States. Trains run over 429 mi (690 km) of track on 12 lines to 143 stations. It is operated under contract by Keolis.

In 2025, the system had a ridership of 29,707,200, or about 111,600 per weekday as of the second quarter of 2026, making it the fifth-busiest commuter rail system in the U.S., behind the three New York-area systems and Metra in Chicago. The lines' characteristic purple-trimmed coaches operate as far south as North Kingstown, Rhode Island, as far north as Newburyport and as far west as Fitchburg, both in Massachusetts.

Trains originate at two major terminals in Boston – South Station and North Station. The only connection between the two halves of the system is the non-revenue Grand Junction Branch. The North–South Rail Link is a proposed tunnel between North Station and South Station to allow through-running service. Passengers currently connect between the stations using MBTA subway service.

== Service ==
=== Lines ===
The system consists of twelve lines – four of which have branches – radiating from downtown Boston. Eight "southside" lines terminate at South Station, with four (Framingham/Worcester, Needham, Franklin/Foxboro, and Providence/Stoughton) also running through Back Bay station. Four "northside" lines terminate at North Station. The lines vary in length from the 9.2-mile (14.8 km) Fairmount Line to the 62.9-mile (101.2 km) Providence/Stoughton Line, with typical lengths in the 25–40-mile (40–64 km) range. The system has 429 miles (690 km) of revenue trackage and covers roughly the eastern third of Massachusetts plus central Rhode Island.

Line	Boston terminal	Outer terminal(s)	Stations	Length	Daily boardings (2024)
Greenbush Line	South Station	Greenbush	10	27.6 miles (44.4 km)	3,741
Kingston Line	South Station	Kingston; Plymouth (indefinitely closed)	11 (1 closed)	35.1 miles (56.5 km) – Kingston; 35.6 miles (57.3 km) – Plymouth	5,310
Fall River/New Bedford Line	South Station	Fall River; New Bedford	15	56.6 miles (91.1 km) – Fall River; 60.0 miles (96.6 km) – New Bedford	6,669
Fairmount Line	South Station	Readville	9	9.2 miles (14.8 km)	4,402
Providence/Stoughton Line	South Station	Wickford Junction; Stoughton	18	62.9 miles (101.2 km) – Wickford Junction; 18.9 miles (30.4 km) – Stoughton	19,078
Franklin/Foxboro Line	South Station	Forge Park/495; Foxboro	18 (Note: This count does not include the 7 intermediate stations on the Fairmount Line, which are served by some Franklin/Foxboro Line trains.) (1 closed)	30.3 miles (48.8 km) – Forge Park/495; 22.6 miles (36.4 km) – Foxboro	10,398
Needham Line	South Station	Needham Heights	12	13.7 miles (22.0 km)	6,064
Framingham/Worcester Line	South Station	Worcester	18	44.2 miles (71.1 km)	14,942
Fitchburg Line	North Station	Wachusett	19 (1 closed)	53.7 miles (86.4 km)	6,288
Lowell Line	North Station	Lowell	9 (1 closed)	25.5 miles (41.0 km)	6,297
Haverhill Line	North Station	Haverhill	15	32.9 miles (52.9 km)	3,856
Newburyport/Rockport Line	North Station	Newburyport; Rockport	19 (1 closed)	36.2 miles (58.3 km) – Newburyport; 35.3 miles (56.8 km) – Rockport	10,392

Most lines do not share trackage outside the Boston terminal areas, with several exceptions. The Providence/Stoughton Line and Franklin/Foxboro Line both use the Northeast Corridor between Readville and South Station, with the Needham Line also sharing the tracks between Forest Hills and South Station. The Fall River/New Bedford Line, Kingston Line, and Greenbush Line all use the Old Colony mainline between South Station and Braintree. The Haverhill Line and Newburyport/Rockport Line share tracks between North Station and near Sullivan Square. A small number of Haverhill Line trains use the inner Lowell Line and the Wildcat Branch, while some Franklin/Foxboro Line trains (including all weekend trains) use the Fairmount Line rather than the Northeast Corridor. Several Amtrak intercity routes run on MBTA tracks: the Acela and Northeast Regional over the Providence/Stoughton Line, the Lake Shore Limited over the Framingham/Worcester Line, and the Downeaster over portions of the Lowell and Haverhill lines. Private companies also operate freight service over much of the system (see § Freight service).

=== Stations ===
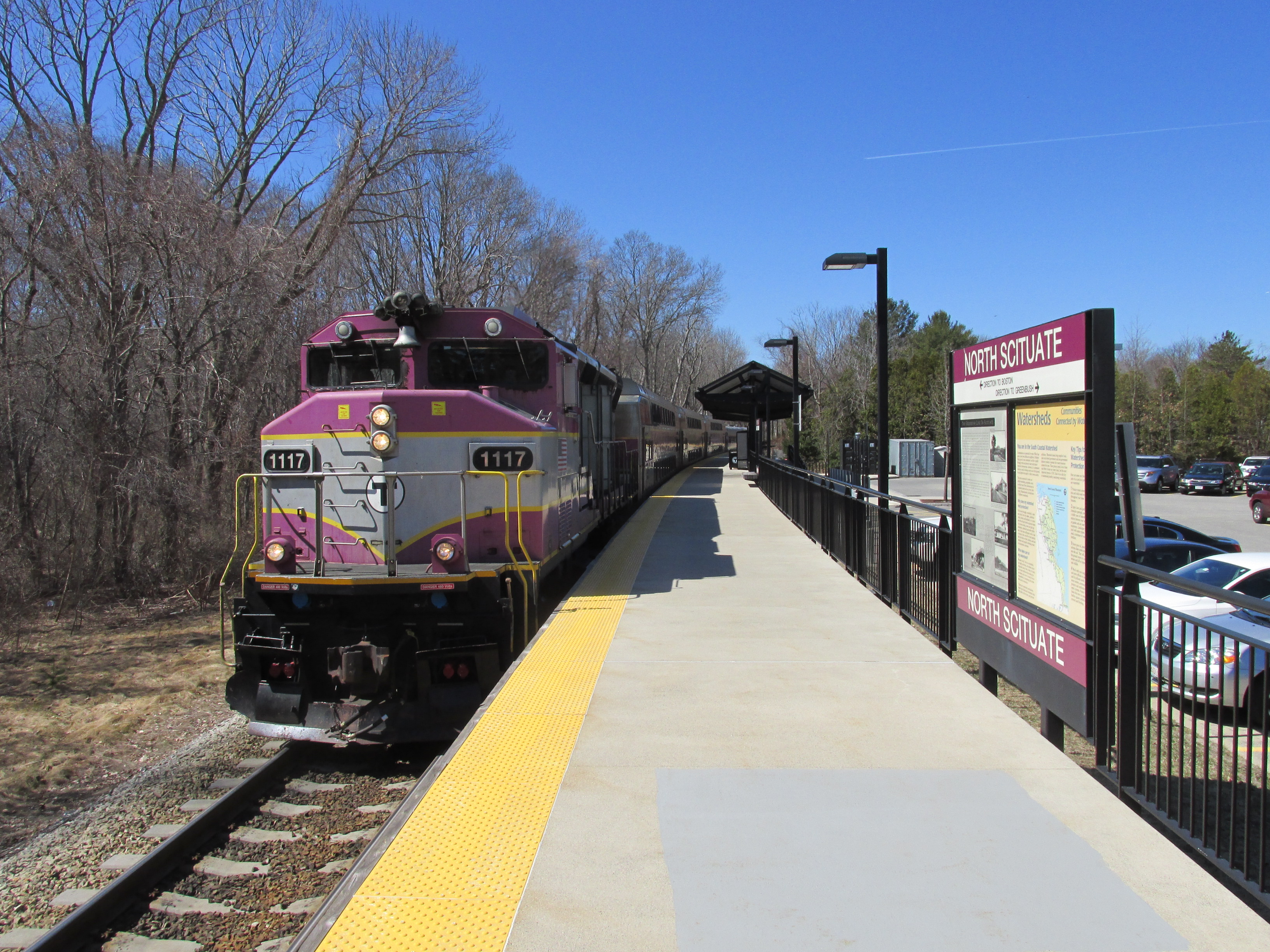
A train at North Scituate – a typical suburban station with a full-length high-level platform

As of July 2025, there are 143 active stations – 56 northside and 87 southside. Five additional stations (Prides Crossing, Mishawum, Hastings, Plimptonville, and Plymouth) are indefinitely closed due to service cuts during the COVID-19 pandemic. Several other stations are planned. South Station, North Station, and Back Bay all have MBTA subway and Amtrak connections; nine other stations have subway connections, and six others have Amtrak connections.

Stations range in size from small platforms like Islington to the sprawling downtown terminals. Most stations outside downtown Boston have one or two side platforms or a single island platform. Standard MBTA platforms are about 800 feet (240 m) long – enough for a nine-car train – and a minimum of 12 feet (3.7 m) wide for side platforms and 22 feet (6.7 m) wide for island platforms. 122 active stations are accessible, including all terminals and all stations with rapid transit connections; 21 are not. The MBTA uses 48-inch (1,200 mm)-high platforms for accessible level boarding, as is standard in the northeastern United States. Some accessible stations have full-length high platforms for accessible boarding on all cars; others only have "mini-high" platforms about 40 feet (12 m) long – which allow for level boarding on two cars – with the rest of the platform length not accessible.

=== Operations ===
The MBTA Commuter Rail system is operated by Keolis Commuter Services – a subsidiary of French company Keolis – under contract to the MBTA. The MBTA owns all passenger equipment and most stations. Most trackage is also owned by the MBTA. The Massachusetts Department of Transportation (parent agency of the MBTA) owns several portions of the Framingham/Worcester Line as well as the Grand Junction Branch, which is used for non-revenue equipment moves between the northside and southside lines. Pan Am Southern owns the section of the Fitchburg Line between Fitchburg and Wachusett, while Amtrak owns the section of the Northeast Corridor (used by the Providence/Stoughton Line) in Rhode Island.

Most lines operate on regular headways, though some have additional service at peak hours. Service levels vary by lines: the Greenbush and Kingston lines have 13 round trips on weekdays, while the Providence/Stoughton Line has 37. Running times vary from 30 minutes on the Fairmount Line to nearly 120 minutes for some Providence/Stoughton Line trips, with 60–75 minutes typical. Most trains stop at all stations on the line; some stations have limited service, and peak-hour express trains operate on several lines. Several lines additionally have some short turn service. The CapeFlyer, a seasonal weekend-only service to Cape Cod, operates using MBTA equipment over the Middleborough/Lakeville Line plus the Cape Main Line (which is not otherwise used by the MBTA). Special express service to Foxboro station is operated during New England Patriots home games and some other events at Gillette Stadium. It runs from South Station via the Franklin/Foxboro Line, and from Providence via the Providence/Stoughton Line. During the winter, one "ski train" round trip of the Fitchburg Line operates with a bicycle car on weekends and Wednesday evenings, with a shuttle bus to Wachusett Mountain.

All MBTA commuter rail service is provided by push-pull trains powered by diesel locomotives (see § Rolling stock). Maximum speed for trains is 79 miles per hour (127 km/h), though some lines have lower limits. The entire system is signalled and operates with Positive Train Control using the Advanced Civil Speed Enforcement System. All lines have cab signals for automatic train control. The MBTA is a member of the Northeast Operating Rules Advisory Committee (NORAC) and uses its operating rules. Most portions of the system operate under NORAC rules 261 and 562, which allow bidirectional train movements on every track (such as an express train passing a local train in the same direction). Most lines are either double track, or single track with passing sidings; portions of the Northeast Corridor have three or four tracks.

==== Freight service ====
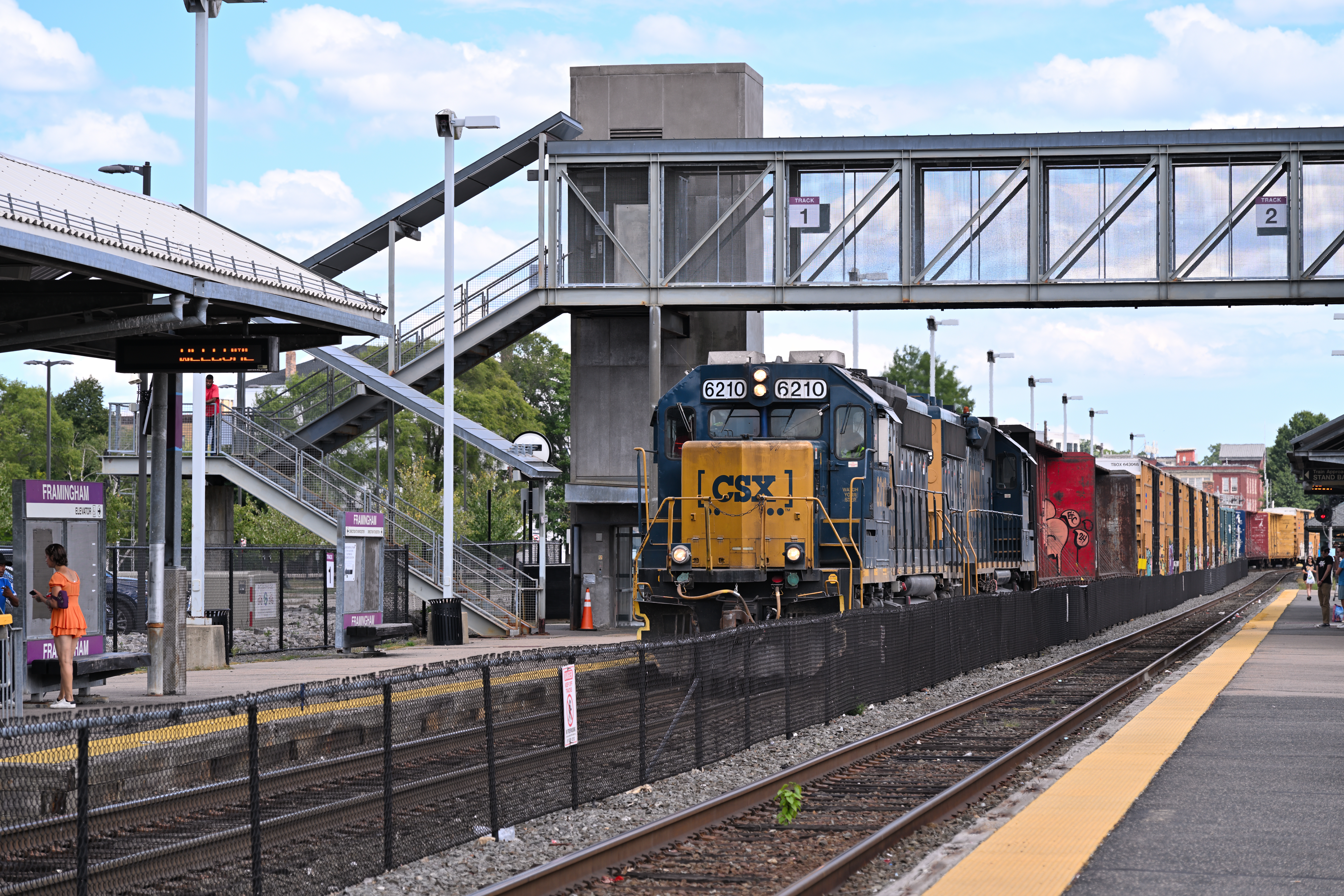
A CSX freight train at Framingham station

Freight service is operated over most of the MBTA Commuter Rail system by several private railroads. CSX Transportation operates freight on most southside lines, of which the outer portion of the Worcester Line has the most freight traffic. Massachusetts Coastal Railroad operates south of Middleborough on the Fall River/New Bedford Line. The Fore River Railroad operates between Braintree Yard and East Braintree on the Old Colony mainline and the Greenbush Line. The Providence and Worcester Railroad shares tracks with Providence/Stoughton Line trains between Providence and Wickford Junction; it uses a freight-only track between Providence and Central Falls. No freight operates on the Needham Line, the Northeast Corridor between Readville and Back Bay, the Old Colony mainline between Boston and the Greenbush Line junction in Braintree, the Kingston Line, and most of the Greenbush Line.

CSX also operates on most northside lines; prior to its 2022 purchase by CSX, Pan Am Railways operated over these lines. The Berkshire and Eastern Railroad (formerly Pan Am Southern) operates over the Fitchburg Line west of Ayer. Their combined Freight Main Line between Mechanicville, New York, and Mattawamkeag, Maine, shares tracks with sections of the Fitchburg, Lowell, and Haverhill lines. No freight service is operated over the Newburyport/Rockport Line north of Salem.

Weight limits and loading gauge vary across the system. The full Framingham/Worcester line is rated for car weights of 315,000 pounds (143,000 kg), sections of lines that are part of the Freight Main Line for 286,000 pounds (130,000 kg), and other lines for lower weights. The western portion of the Framingham/Worcester Line and the southern section of the Providence/Stoughton line can accommodate cars up to 20 feet 8 inches (6.30 m) (AAR Plate H or Plate K). The Fitchburg Line west of Ayer can accommodate cars up to 19 feet 0 inches (5.79 m) (AAR Plate J), while most of the other northside lines can accommodate up to 17 feet 0 inches (5.18 m) (AAR Plate F). The inner Fitchburg and Newburyport/Rockport Lines, and the southside except for the outer Framingham/Worcester Line, have height restrictions smaller than Plate F.

=== Fares ===
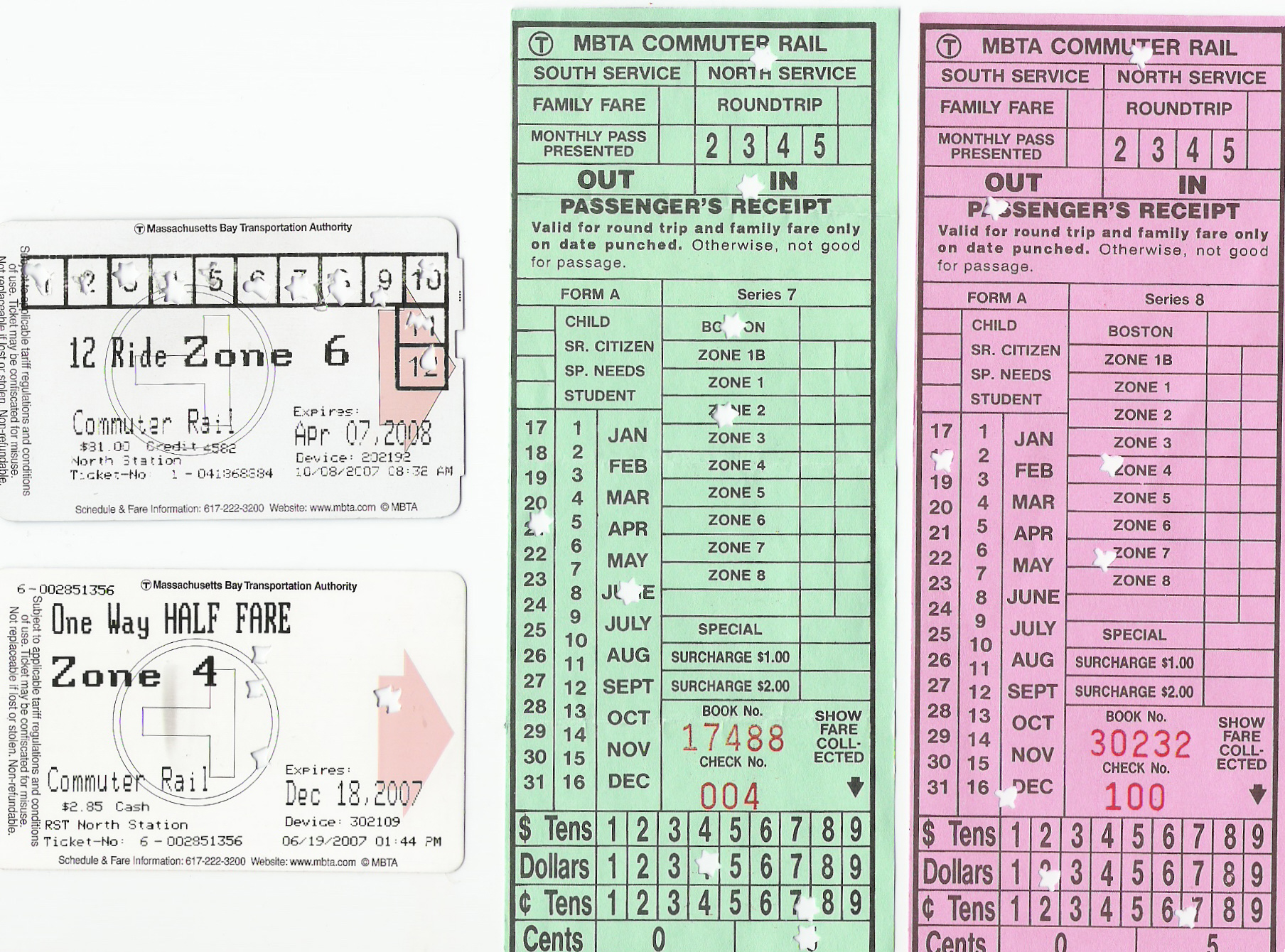
Commuter Rail tickets in the form of CharlieTickets purchased at fare vending machines and ticket booths (left) and paper tickets purchased on-board (right).

MBTA Commuter Rail uses a zone fare system, with fares increasing with distance. Zone 1A includes the downtown terminals and other inner core stations up to about 5 miles (8.0 km) from downtown. Ten additional zones, numbered 1 through 10, extend outwards from Boston. Each zone is about 5 miles, with most outer terminals in zones 6 through 8. Only two stations use further zones: T.F. Green Airport in Zone 9, and Wickford Junction in Zone 10. Zone 1A fares are identical to MBTA subway fares (though subway passes on CharlieCards are not accepted, except for Fairmount Line stations that have CharlieCard validator machines). As of 2024, one-way fares within Zone 1A are $2.40, while fares between further zones and Zone 1A range from $6.50 for Zone 1 to $13.25 for Zone 10. Trips that do not enter Zone 1A have less expensive interzone fares; as of 2024, these range from $2.75 for travel within a single zone to $7.25 for travel between Zone 1 and Zone 10.

Fares can be purchased on the MBTA mTicket app, at automatic vending machines located at major stations, from businesses near some stations, or from conductors on board trains. Discounted passes include monthly passes (with or without free transfer to other MBTA services), "flex passes" valid for five 24-hour periods, and $10 passes offering unlimited travel on a single weekend. As with other MBTA services, discounted fares and passes are available for several groups including disabled passengers, passengers over age 65, and students attending certain schools. Foxboro special event services and the CapeFlyer have separate fares; regular MBTA fares and passes are not valid. Fares are collected by train conductors; while fare evasion is explicitly illegal under state law, it is not criminal. Fare gates have been installed at North Station and South Station, with plans for installation at Back Bay and Ruggles. The second-generation MBTA fare collection system will standardize fare media across modes, including commuter rail.

== History ==
=== Early history ===
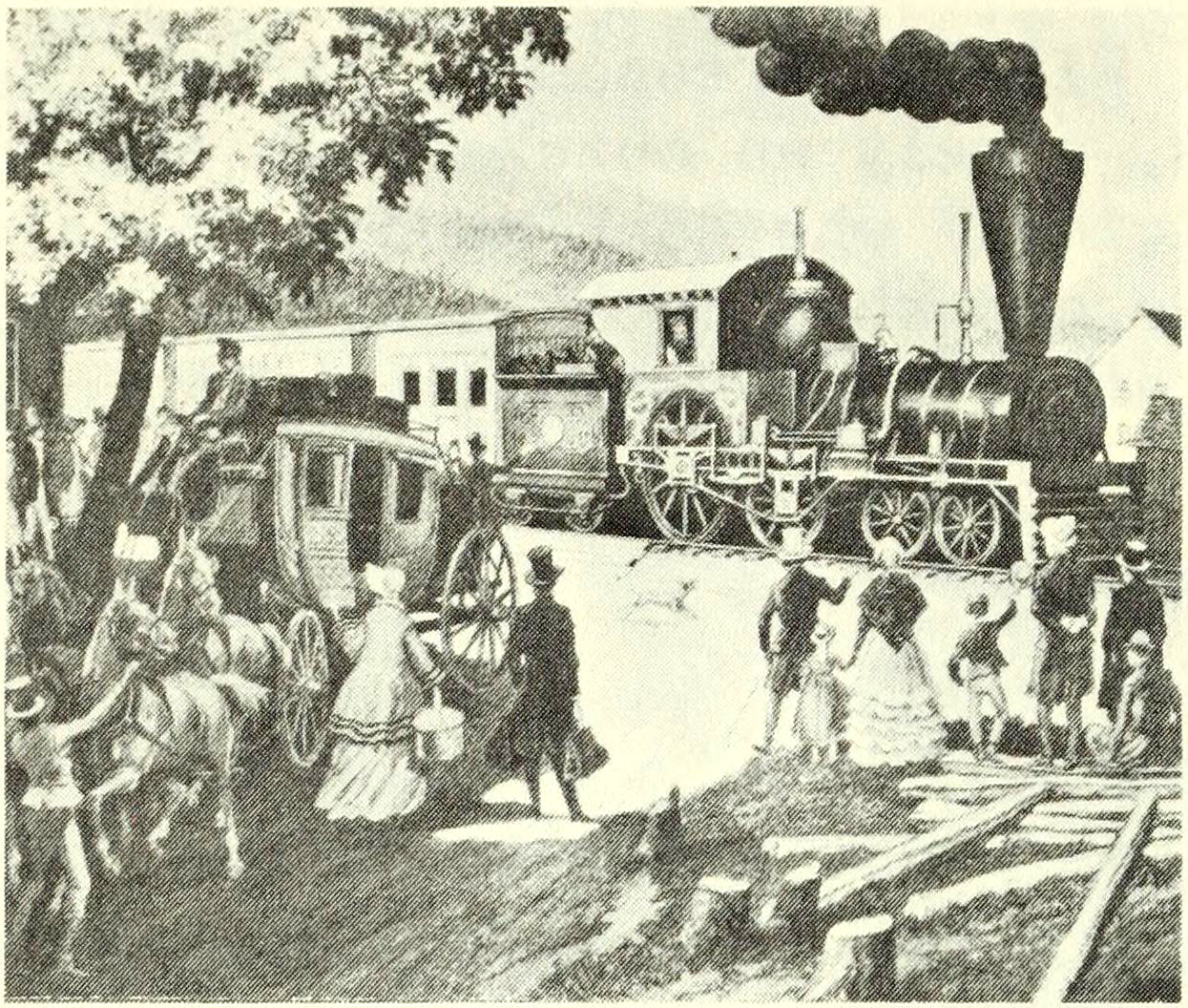
A train at West Newton on the B&W in 1834

Eight intercity mainlines radiating from Boston opened between 1834 and 1855: the Boston and Worcester Railroad (B&W) in 1834–35, Boston and Providence Railroad (B&P) in 1834–35, Boston and Lowell Railroad (B&L) in 1835, Eastern Railroad in 1838–1840, Fitchburg Railroad in 1843–45, Boston and Maine Railroad (B&M) in 1845, Old Colony Railroad and Fall River Railroad in 1845–46, and Norfolk County Railroad in 1849–55. Commuter rail service allowing suburban residents to work in Boston began with the B&W in 1834; by the 1860s, commuting was possible on the eight mainlines and a number of branch lines. Mergers prior to the 1880s were primarily acquisitions of branch lines and consolidations with connecting lines: the B&A merged with the Western Railroad in 1874 to become the Boston and Albany Railroad (B&A), the Fall River Railroad and several other lines merged into the Old Colony Railroad, and the Norfolk County Railroad eventually became part of the New York and New England Railroad (NY&NE). The narrow gauge Boston, Revere Beach and Lynn Railroad (BRB&L) opened in 1875, competing with the inner portion of the Eastern Railroad. Unlike the other lines, it never built rails into downtown Boston, and instead relied on a ferry connection from East Boston.

The B&M obtained control of the Eastern in 1883, the B&L in 1887, and the Fitchburg in 1900, giving it a near-monopoly on rail service north of Boston. North Union Station was built in 1893 to provide a union station for northside service; it was replaced by North Station in 1928. The Old Colony obtained control of the B&P in 1888; the New York, New Haven and Hartford Railroad acquired the Old Colony in 1893 to obtain access to Boston. The New Haven also acquired the New England Railroad (successor to the NY&NE) in 1898. South Station opened in 1899 as a union station for the southside lines (New Haven and B&A). The New York Central and Hudson River Railroad – which later became the New York Central) (NYC) – leased the B&A in 1900; this brought all Boston commuter service save the BRB&L under the control of three large multi-state railroads.

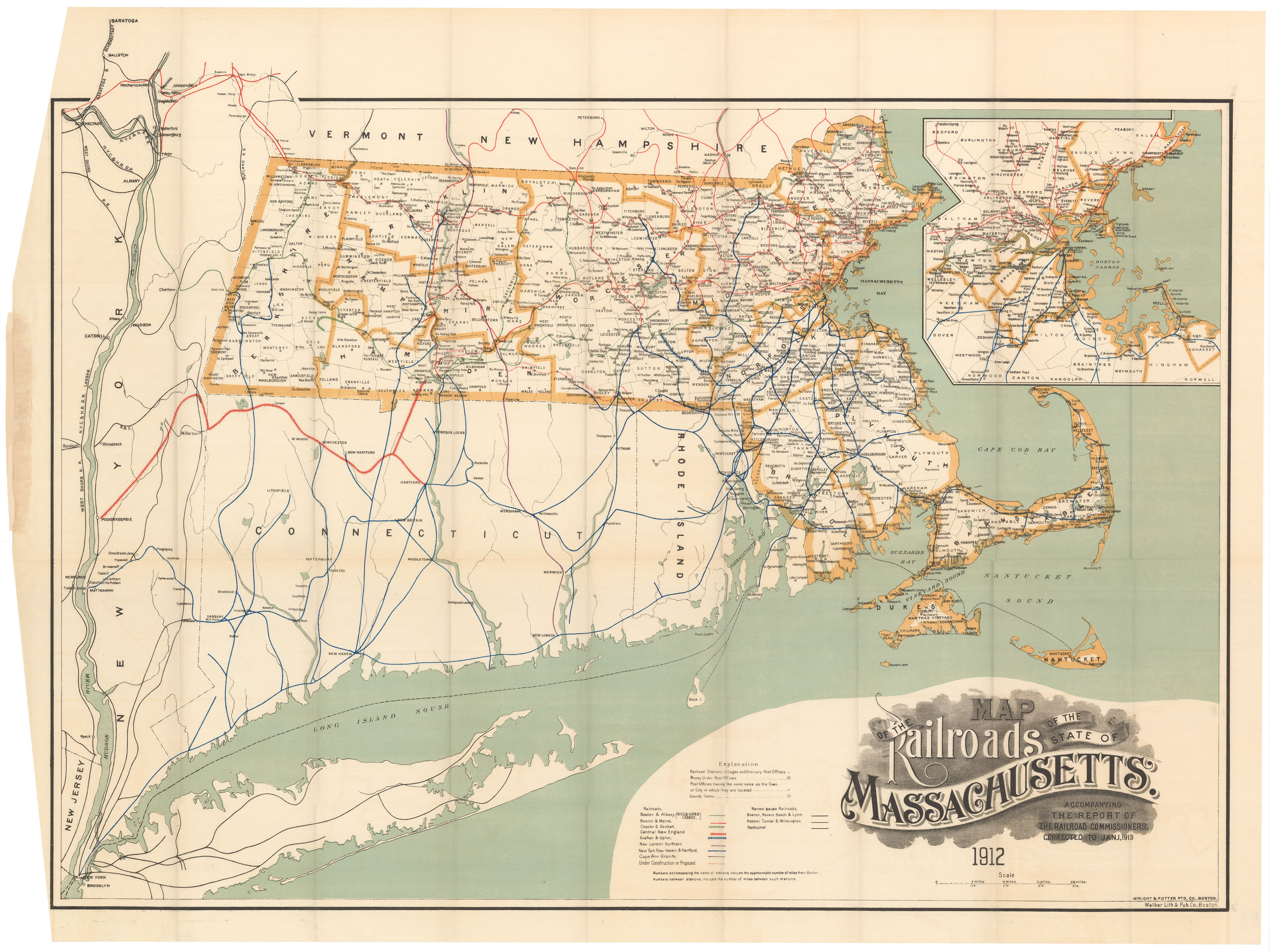
Suburban railroads around Boston in 1912

The three railroads all planned electrification of some suburban lines in the early 20th century. The New Haven tested electrification on small parts of the Old Colony system, but never followed through on its plans to electrify South Station and the inner section of the ex-B&P. Despite a study to electrify the mainline to Framingham plus the Highland branch, the NYC only electrified the short Lower Falls Branch. Quadruple-tracking and electrification of part of the ex-Eastern Railroad was planned by the B&M around 1910 when it was briefly under control of the New Haven, but this fell through when they separated. Service levels on the three major railroads peaked around 1910 and began to decline from streetcar and later auto competition in the 1910s. The independent BRB&L electrified its mainline and single branch line in 1928 and increased service to near-rapid transit levels. Two Old Colony branches were converted to an extension of Boston Elevated Railway (BERy) rapid transit in the 1920s.

Service levels declined more significantly during the 1930s; the 88 stations case resulted in the New Haven closing dozens of suburban stations and several lines in 1938. The BRB&L ceased all operations in 1940. Ridership increased during World War II but decreased soon afterwards, prompting further cuts. The railroads converted from steam to diesel in the 1950s. All three purchased substantial fleets of Budd Rail Diesel Cars, which lowered operating costs – but not enough to save most branch lines. A 1945–47 state report proposed suburban extensions of the rapid transit system, largely using railroad rights-of-way, with the expectation that most commuter rail service would be cut back to the rapid transit terminals or abandoned entirely. Prompted by the report, part of the BRB&L was reactivated as rapid transit in 1952–54 by BERy successor Metropolitan Transit Authority (MTA), and the Highland branch was converted to a rapid streetcar line in 1958–59.

=== Consolidation under MBTA control ===
The three railroads all made major cuts to suburban service in 1958–1960 as commuters began using new expressways. The B&M became unprofitable in 1958 and moved to shed its money-losing passenger operations. Four branch lines were cut that May, and most stations in the MTA service area were closed; three more branches closed in 1959. The New Haven experimentally increased Old Colony Division service for several years in the 1950s, but new management soon sought to reduce costs. Service to Fall River and New Bedford was cut in 1958; a one-year state subsidy was given for the remaining Old Colony service, which ended in 1959 after the Southeast Expressway opened. The inner portion of the B&A was reduced from four to two tracks in 1959 for construction of the Massachusetts Turnpike, with several inner stations closed; all local stops west of Framingham were closed in 1960. The New Haven filed for bankruptcy for the last time in 1961. Faced with the imminent threat of losing what service remained, public opinion began to support subsidies for commuter rail.

The state Mass Transportation Commission (MTC), formed in 1959 to coordinate transportation and land use, held a series of experiments to determine how fares and service levels affected ridership. This included a trial on the MTA bus network, as well as a $4 million test from January 1963 to March 1964 on New Haven and B&M lines. (The NYC, uninterested in its commuter service, declined to participate.) The MTC found that higher frequency was most important to attract additional ridership; lower fares would attract additional riders, while even higher fares would not result in the services becoming profitable. At the recommendation of the MTC, the Massachusetts Bay Transportation Authority (MBTA) was created on August 3, 1964, with a 78-municipality funding and service district. The MBTA was to build rapid transit extensions (as planned in 1947) along some lines, with the others to be subsidized or allowed to be discontinued. Most remaining lines ran to points outside the funding district; those outlying municipalities were expected to reach their own subsidy agreements with the railroads.

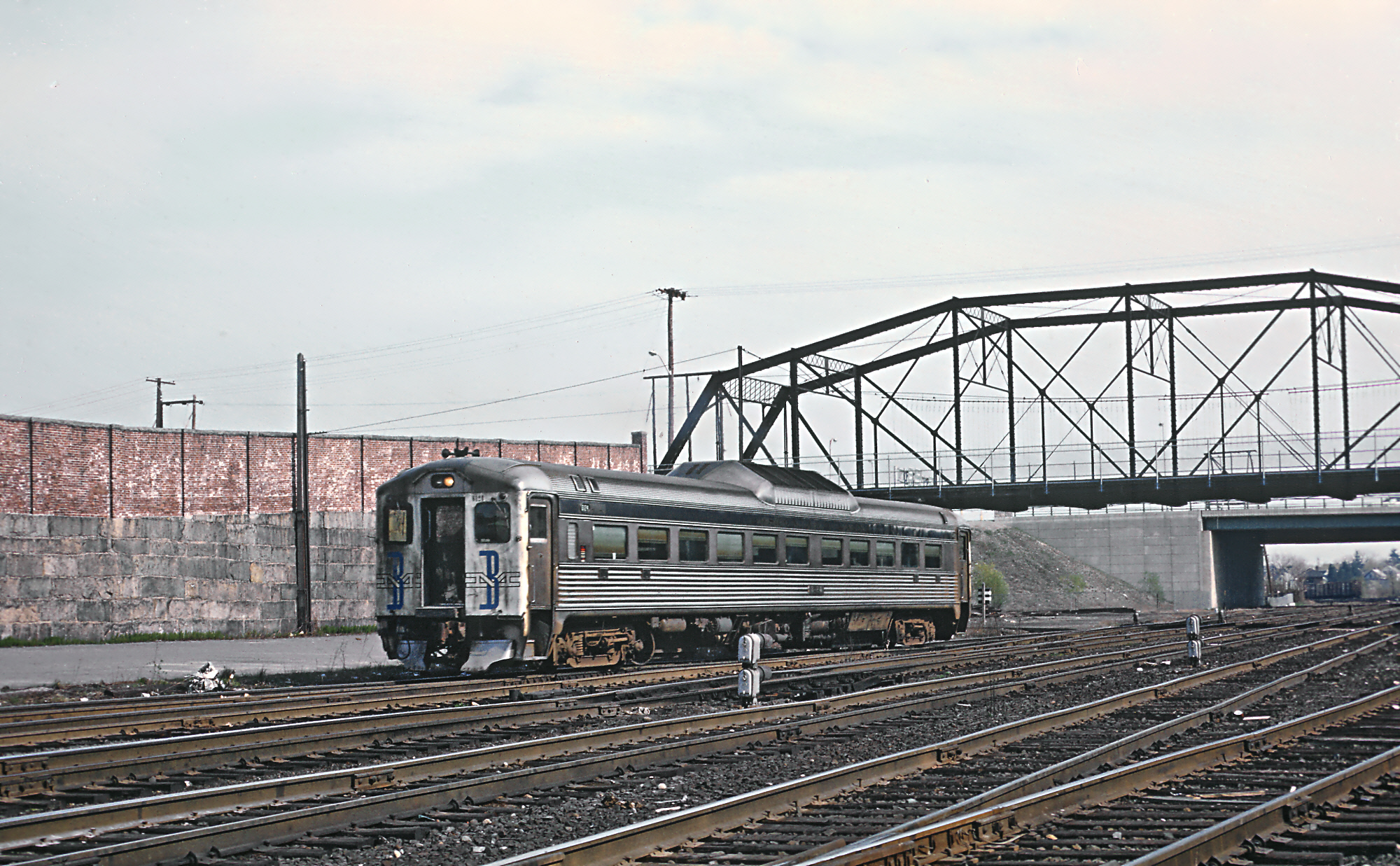
B&M train at Lowell in 1969

On December 14, 1964, the MBTA reached a subsidy agreement with the B&M. The agreement only covered in-district services; on January 4, 1965, the B&M discontinued interstate service except for single commuter round trips from Dover and Concord, New Hampshire; Portsmouth service was cut back to a single Newburyport round trip. Subsidies began for six lines on January 18; all out-of-district service to Fitchburg, Lowell, Haverhill, Ipswich, and Rockport was discontinued except for the single Dover, Concord, and Newburyport round trips. Agreements were reached to restore most out-of-district service; after delays due to a lawsuit by the competing Eastern Massachusetts Street Railway, full service returned to Ayer, Lowell, Ipswich, and Rockport on June 28. On June 30, 1967, the B&M discontinued the Concord trip; the Dover trip was cut back to Haverhill with local subsidies. In 1969, the B&M averaged 24,000 weekday passengers, with a yearly deficit of $3.2 million (equivalent to 28 million in 2025). The single daily trip on the Central Mass Branch ended on January 26, 1971.

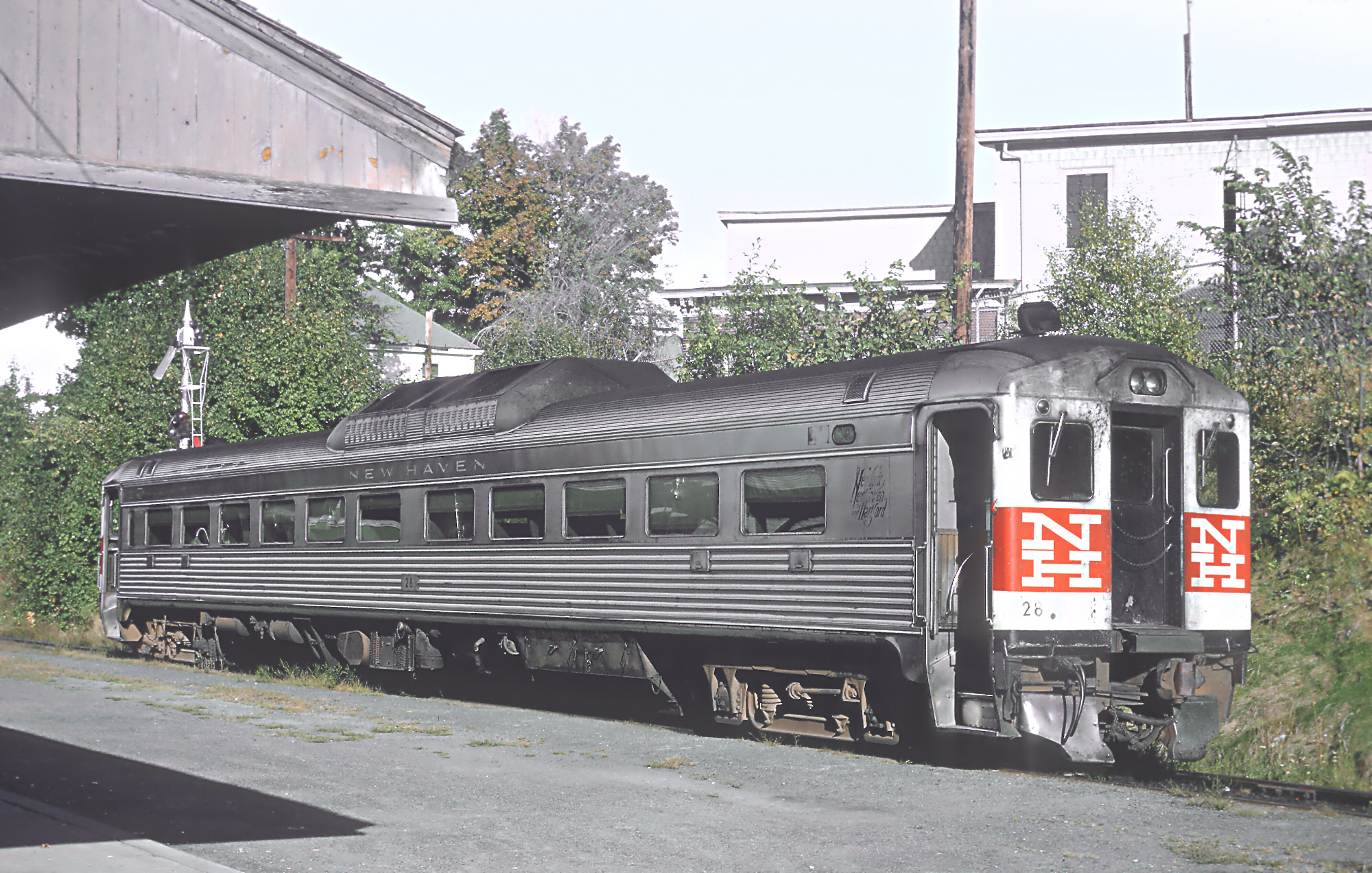
New Haven train at Franklin in 1968

On July 28, 1965, the MBTA signed an agreement with the New Haven Railroad to purchase 11 miles (18 km) of the former Old Colony mainline from Fort Point Channel to South Braintree in order to construct a new rapid transit line along the corridor. The line was expected to be completed within two years. The agreement also provided for the MBTA to subsidize commuter service on the railroad's remaining commuter rail lines for $1.2 million (equivalent to 11 million in 2025) annually. Subsidies for the Needham, Millis, Dedham, and Franklin lines began on April 24, 1966, as the New Haven had Interstate Commerce Commission (ICC) permission to discontinue them otherwise. Three out-of-district stations were cut, while Franklin subsidized its station. The Millis and Dedham lines were discontinued on April 21, 1967. The NYC and the Pennsylvania Railroad merged to form Penn Central on February 1, 1968; the New Haven joined at the end of the year. Penn Central declared bankruptcy in 1970. Amtrak took over most intercity passenger service in the US on May 1, 1971, including New York–Boston trains.

The state agreed in December 1971 to purchase 145 miles (233 km) of Penn Central rights of way to prevent them being sold off in bankruptcy. The MBTA purchased the lines effective January 27, 1973. They included almost all the lines with passenger service: the Attleboro Line and Stoughton Branch, Franklin Branch, Needham Branch, and the Riverside–Framingham portion of the Worcester Main Line. (The inner section of that line was already owned by the Massachusetts Turnpike Authority.) The purchase also included several freight-only or abandoned lines, including the Old Colony mainline between Braintree and Brockton. Subsidies began for the Framingham Line in January 1973, for Canton Junction and Sharon stations in June 1973, and all Providence/Stoughton Line service on September 28, 1976. The MBTA purchased the B&M Western Route between Somerville and Wilmington Junction in September 1973 for construction of the Haymarket North Extension.

From 1967 to 1973, a series of state appropriations covered 90–100% of outside-of-district subsidy. This was reduced to 50% in January 1974, substantially increasing the cost of these municipalities. This resulted in several cuts as municipalities refused the higher subsidies: Ayer service was cut to South Acton on March 1, 1975; the single Newburyport trip ended on April 1, 1976; and the single Haverhill trip ended on June 30, 1976 (North Andover and Andover having previously ended subsidies.) The single round trip to Worcester, never subsidized, was cut to Framingham on October 27, 1975. Amtrak began running the Lake Shore Limited over that route four days later, restoring rail service to Worcester. State subsidies were increased back to 75% in June 1976 to prevent further cuts.

=== Combined operations ===
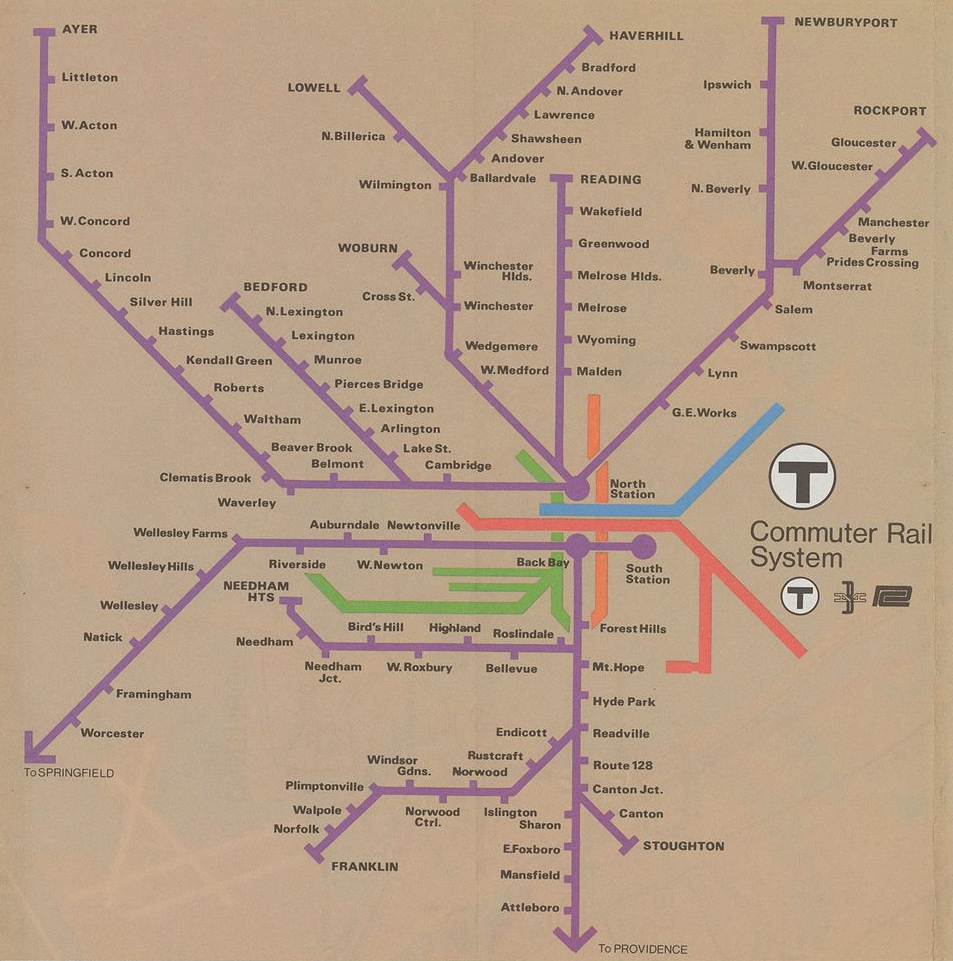
1974 map showing a unified commuter rail system with new purple coloring

Rapid transit extension was slower than expected; by 1971, the only extension in service was the first portion of the Red Line Braintree Branch on the Old Colony mainline. In 1972, as part of a funding shift from highways to transit, Governor Francis Sargent initiated a Commuter Rail Improvement Program. On October 8, 1974, the MBTA began using purple to represent the commuter rail system, as had been done in 1965 with the rapid transit lines. MBTA maps began showing the B&M and Penn Central lines as a single system. Penn Central became Conrail on April 1, 1976; the MBTA purchased most of their commuter rolling stock at that time. After delays due to the B&M bankruptcy, the MBTA purchased the B&M commuter equipment, maintenance facility, and 250 miles (400 km) of right of way on December 27, 1976. This included all lines with passenger service, as well as a number of freight-only or abandoned lines. This also marked the start of a five-year contract for the B&M to operate the service, replacing a series of one-year contracts. After acquiring the B&M and Penn Central rolling stock, the MBTA painted it with purple, yellow, silver, and black to create a visual identity.

Federal subsidies allowed MBTA subsidies to Penn Central to remain the same until March 1977, when a large increase was expected. Since it owned the tracks and equipment, the MBTA bid out the operating contract, which was won by the B&M. The B&M began operating the southside lines on March 15, 1977; for the first time, all Boston commuter service was operated by one entity. Although all operation was subsidized by this time, a small number of cuts took place. The lightly used Lexington Branch closed after a snowstorm on January 10, 1977. Declining subsidies from Rhode Island resulted in off-peak Providence service being cut back to Attleboro in April 1979, with peak service cut on February 20, 1981. Woburn Branch service ended on January 30, 1981, amid state budget cuts.

However, the energy crises of the 1970s and the formation of regional transit authorities prompted some expansions and improvements. $70 million in reconstruction work (equivalent to 615 million in 2025) on the Franklin Line and several northside lines, partially funded by the Urban Mass Transportation Administration, began in 1977 under the Commuter Rail Improvement Program. Service to Haverhill resumed on December 17, 1979, and to Fitchburg and Gardner on January 13, 1980. Federally-funded experimental service to Nashua, Manchester, and Concord, New Hampshire, ran from January 28, 1980, to March 1, 1981. Little-used stations continued to be closed until the 1980s, but several infill stations were opened, including Shirley in 1981, West Natick in 1982, Mishawum in 1984, and Chelsea in 1985. The MBTA also began replacing the aging Rail Diesel Cars and other equipment; 18 EMD F40PH diesel locomotives and 60 passenger cars arrived between 1978 and 1980.

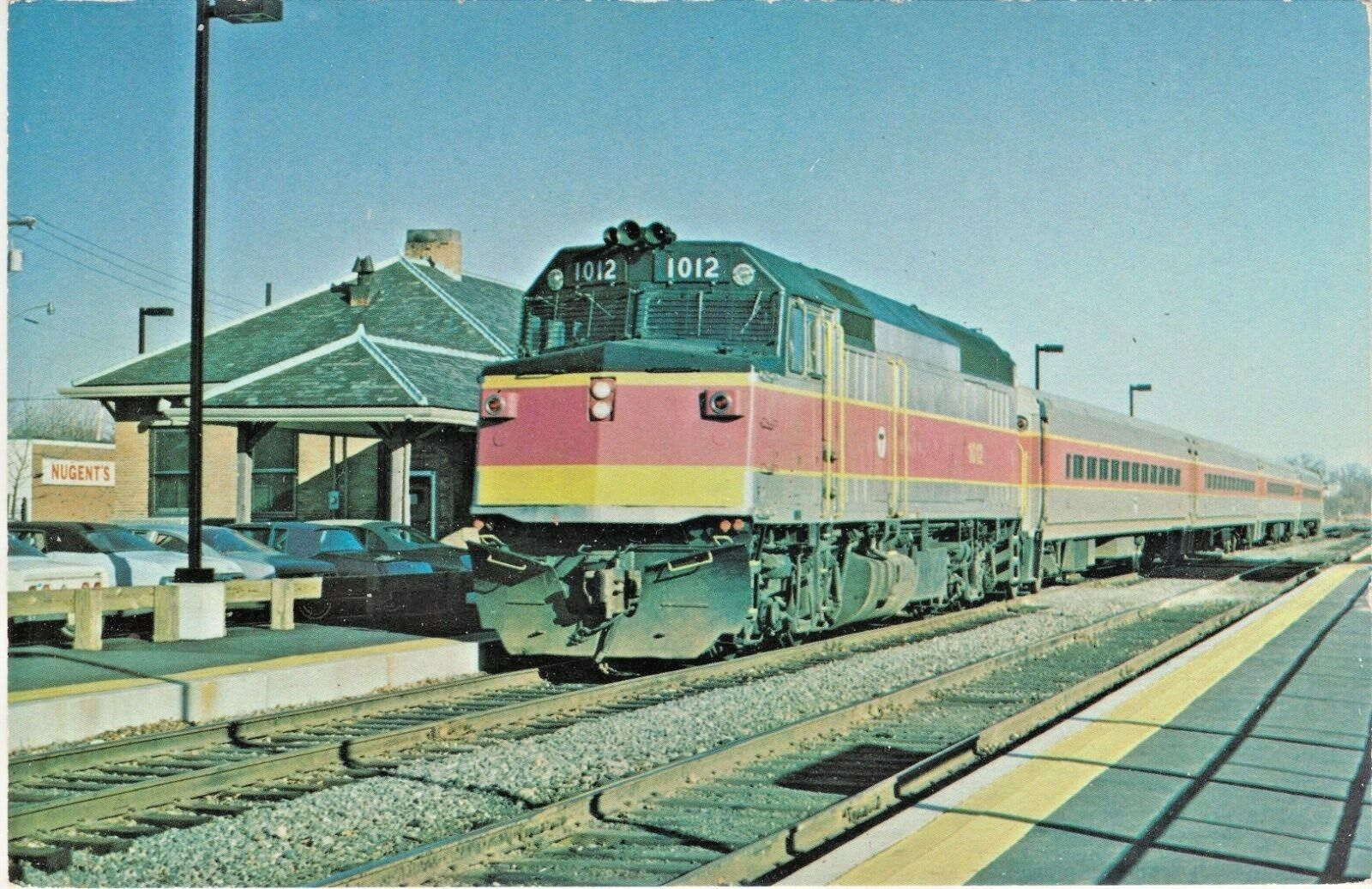
A train of new equipment on the recently upgraded Franklin Line in 1980

Several major disruptions occurred in the mid-1980s. On January 20, 1984, a fire destroyed the wooden approach trestles to the North Station drawbridges. The four northside lines used temporary terminals with rapid transit connections while the trestles were rebuilt. Another bridge fire between Beverly and Salem on November 16, 1984, isolated part of the Ipswich/Rockport Line from the rest of the system. Service to North Station resumed on April 20, 1985; service to Ipswich and Rockport resumed on December 1, 1985.

Guilford Transportation Industries purchased the B&M in 1983. This did not initially affect commuter rail operations. Guilford's attempts to regain profitability, which included reducing employee headcount and pay, soon soured labor relations. This resulted in two strikes by Guilford employees; the first shut down the commuter rail system from March 21 to May 12, 1986. Local media was critical of Guilford during the strike; the company did not bid for a renewal of the commuter rail operating contract, which expired at the end of 1986. Amtrak won the contract for commuter rail operations and took over the system on January 1, 1987. Gardner service was cut back to Fitchburg at that time due to a dispute between Amtrak, Guilford, and the MBTA.

=== Expansions ===
The late 1980s saw the beginning of substantial expansion of the system. The Southwest Corridor project was completed in 1987 with a new below-ground alignment for commuter rail, Amtrak, and Orange Line trains. Back Bay and Forest Hills stations were completely rebuilt as transfer stations, and Ruggles opened to serve the growing Longwood Medical Area. The Needham Line, closed since 1979 for construction, was reopened. The Attleboro and Franklin lines had been diverted over the previously freight-only Dorchester Branch during construction; after they returned to the Southwest Corridor, a shuttle service was retained as the Fairmount Line. Peak-hour service to Providence resumed in 1988 (with off-peak and weekend service later added); South Attleboro was added in 1990 as a park-and-ride station to replace Pawtucket–Central Falls. The Franklin Line was extended to Forge Park/495 in 1988; infill stations in that era included Yawkey in 1988 to serve Boston Red Sox games at Fenway Park, and Dedham Corporate Center in 1990.

Massachusetts had state accessibility laws since 1977 – prior to 1990 federal legislation. At times, the MBTA clashed with state regulators: several stations including West Natick and Chelsea were built without accessible platforms despite state rules; the latter resulted in fines from the Massachusetts Architectural Access Board (MAAB). The opening of South Attleboro was delayed by the MAAB because of the MBTA's refusal to build full-length high-level platforms. However, the MBTA did slowly increase accessibility of the system. Most Ipswich/Rockport line stations were made accessible during the 1984–85 closure, and renovations followed at other stations. South Station was made accessible in the late 1980s, Back Bay during the Southwest Corridor project, and North Station in the early 1990s, providing accessibility at the main downtown Boston stations. By 1992, 44 commuter rail stations were accessible.

In 1991, the state agreed to build a set of transit projects as part of the settlement of a lawsuit by the Conservation Law Foundation (CLF) over auto emissions from the Central Artery/Tunnel Project (Big Dig). Among these project were extensions of the Framingham Line to Worcester and the Ipswich/Rockport Line to Newburyport, restoration of the Old Colony Lines (Middleborough/Lakeville Line and Plymouth/Kingston Line), and addition of 20,000 park and ride spaces outside the urban core. Peak-hour service to Worcester began in 1994, followed by off-peak and weekend service; four intermediate stations were added in 2000 and 2002. Service on the Old Colony Lines began in 1997. Newburyport and Rowley opened in 1998. The MBTA Commuter Rail Maintenance Facility, which replaced the ex-B&M Boston Engine Terminal, was completed in 1998.

Two tenders were submitted in 2003, one from GTI and another from the newly formed Massachusetts Bay Commuter Railroad Company (MBCR), a partnership between Connex (later Veolia), Bombardier Transportation and Alternate Concepts, Inc. MBCR won the contract, and took over the MBTA Commuter Rail operation from Amtrak in July 2003. The MBCR contract originally expired in July 2008 but had an additional five-year option; it was later extended three years to July 2011 and then another two to July 2013. After concerns about on-time performance, the 2011 extension increased the fine for late trains from $100 to $300. The MBTA considered running the service directly rather than contracting it out, but this "public option" was rejected in 2012. In August 2012, MBCR and Keolis were the two bidders for the contract. On January 8, 2014, the MBTA awarded Keolis the contract for $2.68 billion over eight years, with the possibility of two two-year extensions that could bring the total price to $4.3 billion. Keolis took over the operations on July 1, 2014. Keolis lost $29.3 million in its first year of operation. In June 2020, the MBTA extended the contract through at least 2025.

Free Wi-Fi internet service was piloted in January 2008 on the Worcester Line, where 45 coaches were fitted with routers which connected to cellular data networks. This was the first Wi-Fi available on a commuter rail service in the United States. The program was considered successful; in December 2008, the MBTA announced that Wi-Fi would be available on all trains by mid-2009. In July 2014, the MBTA announced that a private company would be building a new network by 2016 to replace the 2008-built network. The MBTA would not pay for the new network; the company would have a two-tier model with a fee for higher bandwidth. The MBTA canceled the plan in August 2017 due to local opposition to the erection of 320 monopoles, each 70-foot (21 m) tall, as well as the need to focus on more critical projects like the Green Line Extension. By that time, the 2008-built system was largely unusable to the decommissioning of 3G networks. Mobile ticketing was introduced on the northside lines on November 12, 2012, and on the southside lines on November 28.

Positive Train Control was implemented on the entire system per a federal mandate, which required installation by the end of 2018 with the possibility of a two-year extension. Construction began in 2017. The final segment of the system to have Positive Train Control activated was the inner Worcester Line on August 15, 2020. Most of the southside lines already had cab signals for automatic train control (ATC) prior to PTC implementation, but the northside lines did not. Cab signals on the southside were completed in 2020. Temporary bus replacements for several lines took place between 2017 and 2022 during PTC and ATC construction and testing. PTC implementation, including cab signals on the northside, was completed in January 2025.

- The Greenbush Line opened in 2007.
- The Riverside-Framingham section was sold to the MBTA in 1976 as part of their larger acquisition of PC commuter assets, but the section past Framingham remained in Conrail control. In September 2009, Conrail successor CSX Transportation and the Commonwealth finalized a $100,000,000 (equivalent to $150,069,800 in 2025) agreement to purchase CSX's Framingham to Worcester tracks, as well as the Grand Junction Railroad plus lines which will be part of the South Coast Rail project, to improve service on the Framingham/Worcester Line. After several years of construction and negotiations, ownership of the line was transferred to the commonwealth on October 4, 2012, with increased service on the outer section of the line beginning several weeks later.
- As Big Dig mitigation, MBTA rebuilt existing stations and added 4 new stations along the Fairmount Line. The first of these, Talbot Avenue, opened on November 12, 2012, followed by Newmarket and Four Corners/Geneva on July 1, 2013. Blue Hill Avenue station was opened on February 25, 2019, after many delays.
- Service along the Providence/Stoughton Line was extended further south to T. F. Green Airport in Warwick, Rhode Island, in December 2010 and to Wickford Junction in North Kingston in April 2012. This represents the first commuter service in Rhode Island south of Providence since 1981.
- In 2013, the CapeFLYER service began running from South Station to Hyannis on summer weekends – the first direct service from Boston to Cape Cod since 1959. Though officially a Cape Cod Regional Transit Authority service, the CapeFLYER uses MBTA equipment.
- A 4-mile extension of the Fitchburg Line to Wachusett station opened on September 30, 2016.

==== COVID-19 pandemic ====
Weekday service was substantially cut on March 17, 2020, due to reduced ridership during the COVID-19 pandemic. On June 22, service was increased to 85% of normal weekday levels. Changes effective November 2 reduced peak service and increased off-peak service, providing more consistent midday headways on some lines; Foxboro pilot service was suspended. In November 2020, as part of service cuts during the pandemic, the MBTA proposed to close six low-ridership stations. On December 14, the MBTA Board voted to enact a more limited set of cuts, including indefinitely closing five stations. That day, temporary reduced schedules were again put into place, with four of the five stations (Hastings, Silver Hill, Prides Crossing, and Plimptonville) not served.

On January 23, 2021, reduced schedules based on the December 14 vote went into place, with no weekend service on seven lines. Service changes on April 5, 2021, increased midday service on most lines as part of a transition to a regional rail model. Weekend service on the seven lines resumed on July 3, 2021. Ridership dropped substantially during the COVID-19 pandemic, with daily boardings just 12,800 during the first quarter of 2021. Ridership rose to 47,100 average weekday boardings in the first quarter of 2022, and 85,000 (69% of 2018 ridership) in October 2022. Limited Foxboro service resumed in May 2022; full pilot service began that September. The service was made permanent effective October 2, 2023. Silver Hill station reopened on November 18, 2024.

In April 2024, the MBTA extended the Keolis contract by one year to June 30, 2027, at which time a successor contract will take effect. In December 2024, the MBTA indicated that the next contract might be split into separate contracts for train maintenance, infrastructure maintenance, operations, and dispatching. The MBTA announced three shortlisted firms, including a consortium of Keolis and Alstom, in December 2025. The agency issued a request for proposals at that time, with the intention of selecting the next operator by the end of 2026.

The South Coast Rail project extended service to the South Coast cities of Taunton, Fall River, and New Bedford. A full planning process was held from 1990 until its suspension in 2002. Planning restarted in 2007, with environmental documentation completed in August 2013. Plans were modified into two phases in 2017 due to an increase in costs. Phase I construction to run diesel service as an extension of the Middleborough/Lakeville Line via the Middleboro Secondary took place from 2020 to 2024. Service began on March 24, 2025.

== Rolling stock ==
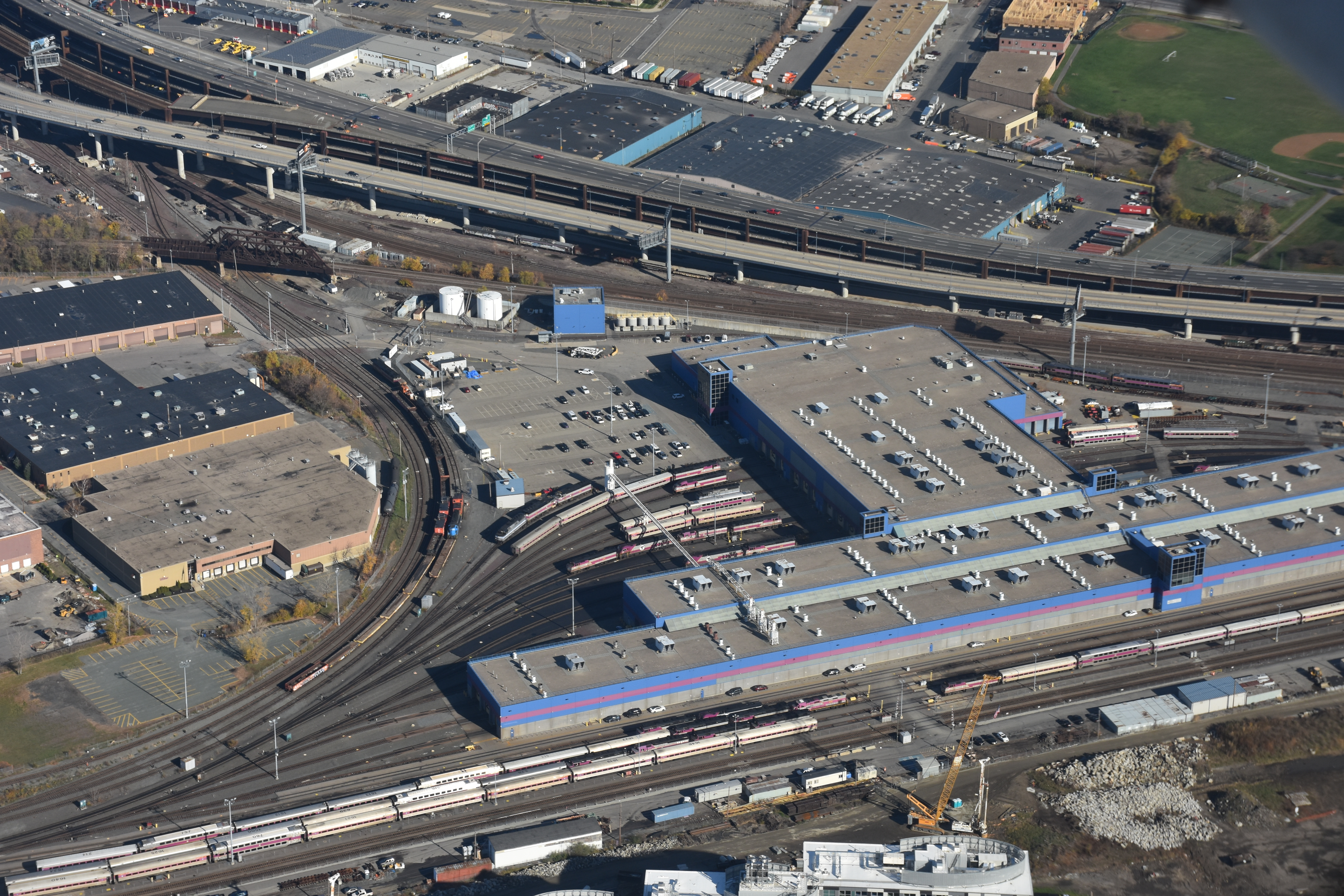
Aerial view of the MBTA Commuter Rail Maintenance Facility

All MBTA commuter rail service is provided by push-pull trains powered by diesel locomotives with a cab car on the opposite end. The locomotive is usually on the end facing away from Boston so that diesel exhaust does not enter the passenger concourses at North Station and South Station. Trains typically have four to eight coaches (with six the most common) and seat between 400 and 1,400 passengers. Approximately 66 trainsets are needed for weekday service.

The primary heavy maintenance facility is the MBTA Commuter Rail Maintenance Facility, located in the Inner Belt District in Somerville. It is also used for midday and overnight storage of trains on the northside lines. Southampton Street Yard and the Readville Interim Layover facility are used for light maintenance and layover service. Various other layover facilities are used for midday and overnight storage; most are located near the outer ends of the lines. Some maintenance and storage of MBTA equipment is contracted out to the Seaview Transportation Company in North Kingstown, Rhode Island.

Several additional yards are under construction or planned. Two layovers are under construction for South Coast Rail, with service planned for mid-2025, and the Haverhill Line layover at Bradford is proposed for relocation later in the 2020s. A new midday layover yard at the former Beacon Park Yard is planned to be constructed by 2032 as part of the realignment of I-90. A large midday and overnight layover yard, which would support expanded service including regional rail and electrification, is planned at Widett Circle near South Station. The MBTA also plans to construct a southside maintenance and layover facility at Readville, replacing the existing layover yard there, as the Grand Junction Branch will be closed for several years during the I-90 project.

=== Locomotive fleet ===
As of February 2026, the MBTA owned 109 locomotives. Of these, 98 were in active passenger service. Two were undergoing rebuild, eight awaiting repairs, and three retired or out of service. All passenger locomotives are equipped with head end power. Rebuilding of 37 F40PH-2C and F40PHM-2C locomotives to F40PH-3C class by MotivePower (MPI) began in 2017; other older locomotives are also being rebuilt by MPI or in-house. The 40 HSP46 locomotives will be sent to Wabtec for rebuilding as well. As of February 2026, the MBTA plans to acquire 10 new battery-electric locomotives for electrified Providence Line service, and another 10 new diesel locomotives compliant with EPA Tier 4 emissions regulations for service on other lines, with options for an additional 50 locomotives of either type.

Year built	Builder	Model	Numbers	Number active	Notes	Image
1973–1975	GMD	GP40MC	1115–1139, 1776	21	Originally built as GP40-2LW for Canadian National Railways; rebuilt by AMF for passenger service in 1997. Most are being rebuilt in-house.	
1987–1988	EMD	F40PH-3C	1050–1075	25	Originally built as F40PH-2C. Rebuilt by MPI in 2001–2003, and again by MPI as F40PH-3C in 2019–2024.	
1991–1993	Morrison–Knudsen	F40PH-3C	1025–1036	12	Originally built as F40PHM-2C. Rebuilt by MPI in 2003–2004, and again by MPI as F40PH-3C in 2019–2024.	
2009	MPI	MP36PH-3C	010-011	0	Purchased from Utah Transit Authority in 2011. Being overhauled by MPI.	
2013–2014	MPI	HSP46	2000–2039	40	To be overhauled by Wabtec by March 2032.	
2009	NRE	NRE 3GS21B	3248–3249	2	Work locomotives – not used for passenger service	
2028-2030 (planned)	Siemens	Charger	TBD	10	Diesel. Will replace some F40PH-3C and GP40MC locomotives.	
2029-2031 (planned)	Siemens	Charger	TBD	10	Battery/catenary electric. Will replace some F40PH-3C and GP40MC locomotives. For Providence Line service.	
Leased locomotives
2025–2026	Rolling Stock Solutions	F40PH-4C	RSTX 1001–1011	12 planned	Ex-Amtrak units; RSTX 1002 entered service in March 2026.	
	MotivePower	MP20GP-3	PNLX 2107	1	Work locomotive leased from Precision Locomotive Leasing	
	GMD	GP40-2LW	PNLX 9619	1	Work locomotive leased from Precision Locomotive Leasing	

=== Coach fleet ===
As of February 2026, the MBTA owned 506 coaches. Of these, 443 were in active service, three being repaired or overhauled, and 63 stored pending disposition or reuse. Coaches whose designations start with BTC (Blind Trailer Coach) are conventional coaches, while those starting with CTC (Control Trailer Coach) are cab cars. Coaches acquired before 1990 were single-level cars with 88 to 127 seats; those since are bilevel cars with 173 to 185 seats. Some coaches are equipped with electronic doors for use on the Middleborough/Lakeville, Kingston, and Greenbush lines, which have full-length high-level platforms at all stations. All BTC-3, CTC-3, BTC-4C, and BTC-4D coaches have restrooms. During winter months, a Ski Train serving Wachusett Mountain runs on the Fitchburg Line, using a coach car which is equipped for carrying bicycles or skis. Three converted coaches — a bike car and two cafe cars — are reserved for the CapeFLYER.

The agency issued a $279 million contract (total project cost of $345 million) for 80 additional Rotem bilevel coaches in September 2019, with delivery expected from September 2022 to June 2024. The contract was later modified to 83 coaches, of which 43 are cab cars. The first four of the 83 bilevel cars arrived in June 2022 and entered service in 2023. In May 2024, the MBTA exercised an option order for 41 additional trailer coaches at a cost of $203 million, with deliveries to begin in mid-2026. An $165 million option for 39 additional coaches (29 trailers and 10 cab cars), which would allow the retirement of all remaining single-level equipment, was exercised in November 2024 with deliveries to begin in 2027.

Year built	Builder	Model	Numbers	Number active	Seats	Notes	Image
1978–79	Pullman	BTC-1C	200–202, 204–214, 216–258	30	114	Rebuilt from BTC-1 and CTC-1 cars in 1995–1996. Coach 219 is a bike/ski car, 221 a bike car, and 224 and 225 café cars. 253 is equipped with lasers for non-revenue use removing leaf debris from tracks.	
1987	Bombardier	BTC-1A	350–389	40	127		
1987–88	MBB	BTC-3	500–542	7	86	533–542 were converted from CTC-3 in 2019–2022. 525 and 529 were converted to non-revenue office cars in 2024.	
1987–88	MBB	CTC-3	1500–1533	0	96		
1989–90	Bombardier	BTC-1B	600–653	49	122		
1989–90	Bombardier	CTC-1B	1600–1652	20	122	Cab controllers have been deactivated in coaches 1600–1624 for use as blind coaches. No cars of this group are still in active service as control trailer coaches.	
1990–91	Kawasaki	BTC-4	700–749	50	185	All units were overhauled by Alstom in 2014–2019.	
1990–91	Kawasaki	CTC-4	1700–1724	24	175	All active units were overhauled by Alstom in 2014–2019.	
1997–1998	Kawasaki	BTC-4A	750–766	17	182	All units were overhauled by Alstom in 2019–2021.	
2001–2002	Kawasaki	BTC-4B	767–781	15	182	All units were overhauled by Alstom in 2019–2021.	
2005–2006	Kawasaki	BTC-4C	900–932	33	178		
2012–2014	Hyundai Rotem	BTC-4D	800–846	47	179		
2012–2014	Hyundai Rotem	CTC-5	1800–1827	28	173		
2022–2024	Hyundai Rotem	BTC-4D	847–886	40	179		
2022–2024	Hyundai Rotem	CTC-5	1828–1870	43	173		
2026–2027	Hyundai Rotem	BTC-4D	400-469	0	179	70 on order. First 2 arrived for testing in October 2026	
2026–2027	Hyundai Rotem	CTC-5	1400-1409	0	173	10 on order. Deliveries will start in 2027	

=== Retired equipment ===
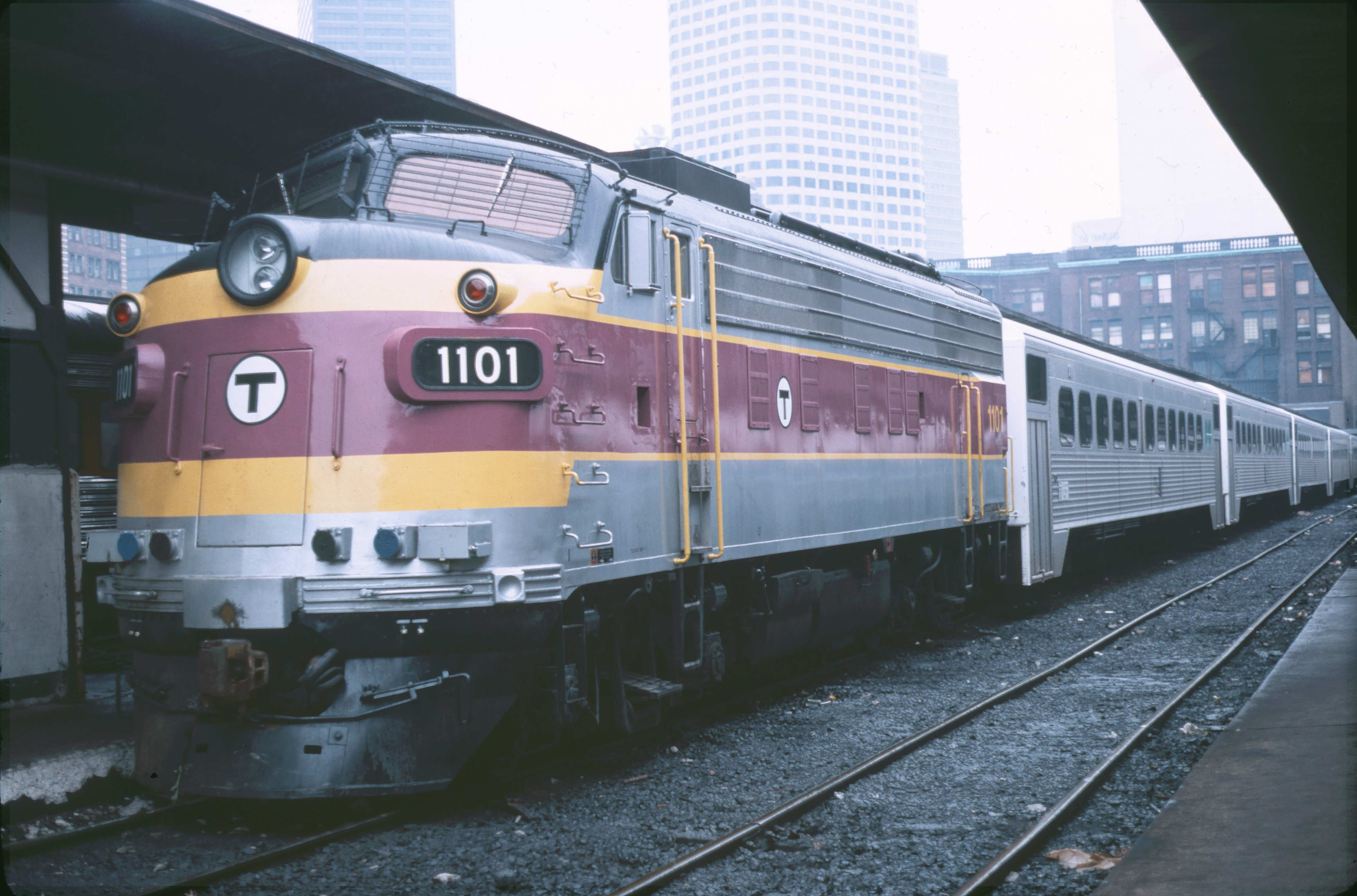
An EMD FP10 locomotive with rented GO Transit coaches at South Station in 1979

As the MBTA assumed control of the commuter rail during the 1970s, it inherited various equipment from predecessor railroads. The 1976 purchase of B&M and Penn Central equipment included 94 Budd Rail Diesel Cars (RDCs) – 86 from the B&M and eight from Penn Central – plus 116 Penn Central coaches and 25 Penn Central E8 and GP9 diesel locomotives. Although the MBTA purchased some new equipment in 1978–1980, large locomotive and coach fleets were not purchased until the late 1980s, so the first decade of combined operations used a variety of secondhand equipment in addition to that acquired in 1976:

- Four ALCO PA locomotives leased from the Delaware and Hudson Railway in 1978
- 48 coaches leased from GO Transit in 1978–1980. 51 coaches (some of which were in the previous group) were leased in 1984–85.
- 19 EMD GP7 locomotives leased from the B&M in 1978–1982
- 24 RDCs acquired or leased from MARC, SEPTA, and New Jersey Transit between 1983 and 1987
- 11 EMD GP9 locomotives acquired from the Burlington Northern Railroad and SEMTA in 1983–1986
- One EMD SW9 locomotive acquired from the Seaboard Coast Line Railroad in 1984

Most of the secondhand and inherited equipment was retired between 1979 and 1989. 33 ex-B&M RDCs were converted to locomotive-hauled coaches (designated BTC-2 and CTC-2) in 1980 and 1982; they were retired by 1989. This left all MBTA service operated by locomotives and coaches purchased new by the MBTA. At several points since, the MBTA or its contract operator has temporarily leased locomotives when needed. Some passenger equipment acquired new by the MBTA has been retired:

- 18 EMD F40PH locomotives (1000–1017), built 1978–1980 and last ran in 2015
- 19 EMD FP10 locomotives (1100–1114 and 1150–1153), rebuilt 1979 from Gulf, Mobile and Ohio Railroad locomotives and last ran in 1991

== Capital projects ==
The following projects are actively being pursued by the MBTA and are at various stages of construction, planning, or funding.

=== Regional Rail Modernization Program ===
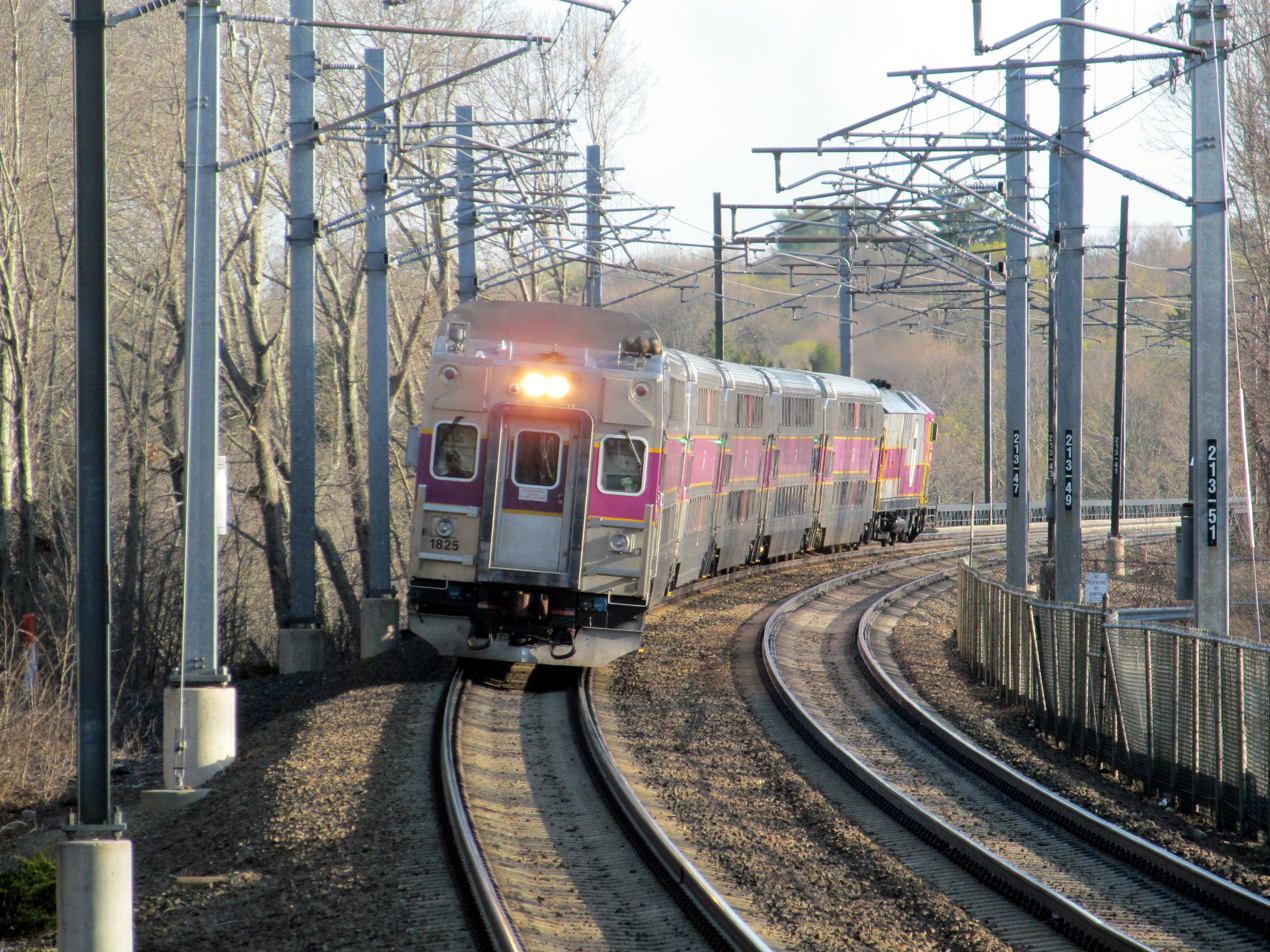
A diesel MBTA train on the electrified Northeast Corridor

The Regional Rail Modernization Program is a long-term initiative to transition the commuter rail system from diesel-powered, peak-oriented service to a battery-electric regional rail network with frequent all-day service. The program was initiated in early 2025 following several years of planning. Regional rail concepts were first proposed in the late 2010s after the cancellation of the Indigo Line project (a proposed hybrid rail network) in 2015. Between 2018 and 2019, the MBTA conducted the Rail Vision study to evaluate regional rail alternatives, drawing on domestic and international examples. In 2019, the now-defunct Fiscal and Management Control Board (FMCB) endorsed the study and established the MBTA Regional Rail Transformation Office; Network Rail Consulting was selected to assist with early transition planning.

Despite endorsement by the FMCB, planning for regional rail stagnated into the early 2020s. Several proposed electrification pilots were cancelled. By 2022, the MBTA committed to systemwide battery electrification with limited catenary infrastructure as a cost-saving measure. By 2025, planned early improvements to facilitate regional rail include capacity upgrades (including turnback tracks, layover expansion, double-tracking, station reconstruction, track replacement) and new equipment procurement. In October 2026, the MBTA purchased 20 new locomotives from Siemens Mobility, including 10 dual-mode battery-electric Charger locomotives to facilitate electrified Providence Line service by the early 2030s. As of late 2026, the MBTA is developing an updated ten-year regional rail modernization plan by 2027.

==== Fairmount Line BEMU pilot ====
In July 2024, the MBTA approved a $54 million pilot proposal from operator Keolis to lease battery electric multiple units (BEMUs) to facilitate 20-minute headways on the Fairmount Line. In May 2026, the MBTA Board endorsed a $765.4 million, 15-year lease agreement for seven 4-car bilevel BEMU trainsets (with the option to procure an additional 96 cars) and a light maintenance/acceptance facility at Readville; the plan was approved in June 2026. Stadler Rail was named the BEMU manufacturer with financing provided by Rock Rail; BEMUs will be leased by Keolis through the MBTA's operational budget. The first BEMUs are planned for testing by 2029, with full pilot service projected to begin by 2030.

=== Infrastructure improvements ===
The following projects are underway to facilitate the improvement of facilities, infrastructure, and services:

- Plans to double track the Haverhill Line between the towns of Reading and Andover were announced in August 2026. The project will add approximately 6.5 miles (10.5 km) of double track in addition to improved signaling and station infrastructure. Completion is expected by 2030.
- In 2019, the MBTA committed to the replacement of Draw One bridge at North Station. The reconstructed bridge will increase capacity from 4-tracks to 6-tracks. A design/build contract was issued in April 2026, with completion expected by 2032.
- The MBTA began work on multiphase project to double track approximately 11.5 miles (18.5 km) of the Franklin/Foxboro Line between Norwood and Franklin in 2019. The segments between Walpole station and Franklin station are expected for completion by 2026; the final segment between Walpole and Norwood Central is unfunded.
- Plans to establish a new layover facility at Widett Circle were announced in September 2026. The multiphase project will construct a total of 26 new layover tracks for lines serving South Station. The first 6 tracks are planned for completion by 2029; construction of the additional 20 tracks remains unfunded.

==== Station renovations ====
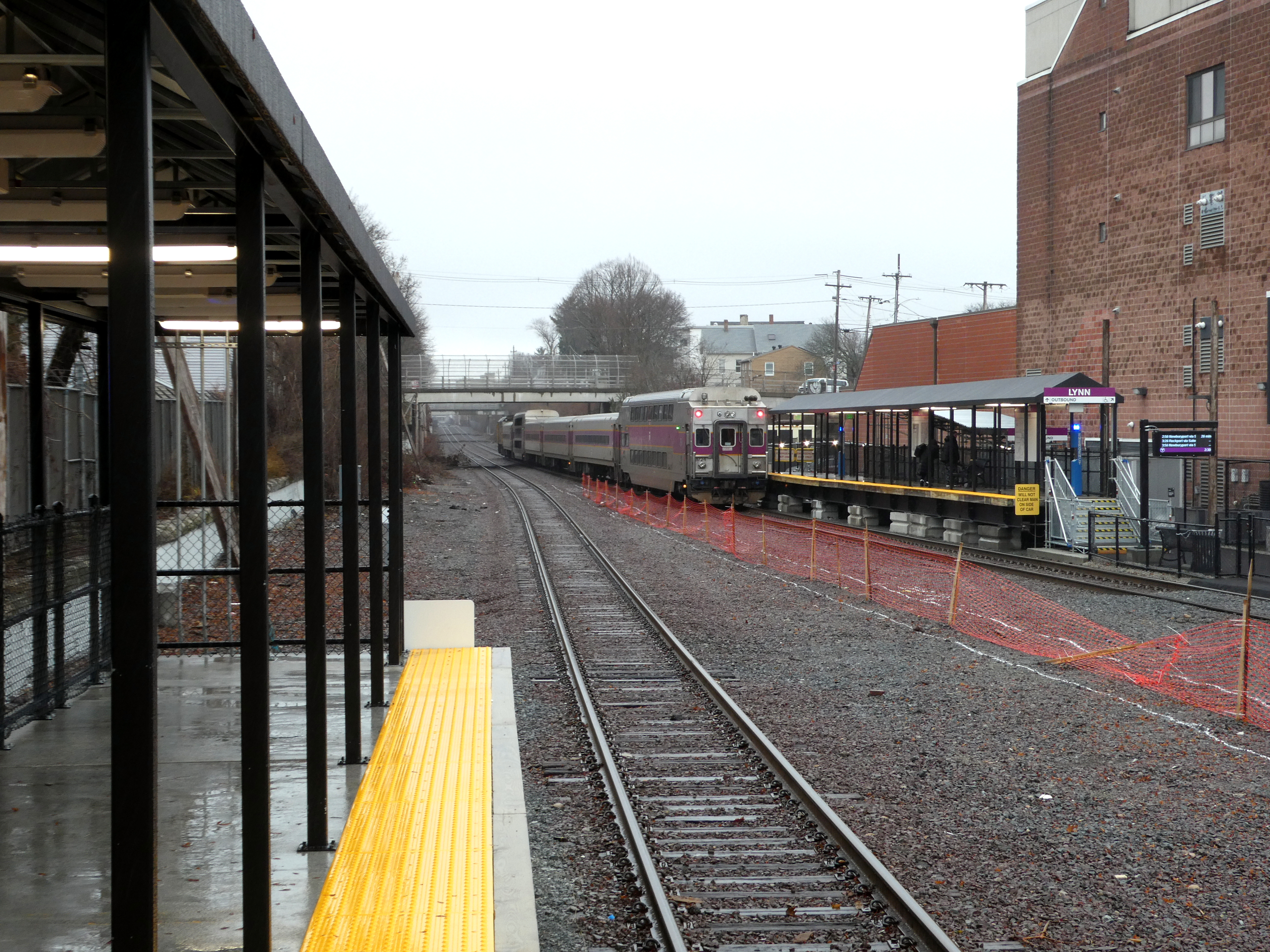
The temporary platforms at Lynn station

Several station renovations are underway or funded for construction:

- Endicott, Wyoming Hill, Belmont Center, Concord, Lincoln, Melrose/Cedar Park, and Wellesley Hills stations will receive accessible freestanding mini-high platforms between 2026 and 2027.
- In November 2024, the MBTA committed to the reconstruction of Newtonville station for accessibility and increased capacity. A design/build contract was issued in December 2025, with completion expected by 2028.
- In August 2026, the MBTA committed to the reconstruction of Reading, North Wilmington, Ballardvale, and Andover stations for accessibility and increased capacity as part of a Haverhill Line double track project. Construction is expected between 2028 and 2030.
- Plans for the reconstruction of Lynn station were announced in 2019. The station closed in October 2022 due to structural deterioration, with interim platforms opened by December 2023; demolition work was completed by June 2025. A design contract was issued by December 2025, with project completion expected by 2030.
- The expansion of North Station with a new island platform is included as part of the Draw One replacement project. Two new station tracks will be served (tracks 11 and 12); a design/build contract was issued May 2026, with completion expected by 2032.

The following station renovations are planned or partially initiated, but are not currently funded:

- The full reconstruction of South Attleboro station was announced in 2019. The station closed in February 2021 due to structural deterioration, with demolition work completed in October 2023; limited service resumed in May 2024. 100% design was completed in April 2022, though by May 2025 the project was indefinitely paused pending future funding.
- The reconstruction of Auburndale and West Newton stations were initially planned alongside Newtonville station in 2019. By April 2024, plans to reconstruct all three stations were paused due to rising costs and funding limitations. In November 2024 the MBTA moved forward with the reconstruction of Newtonville, with Auburndale and West Newton indefinitely paused pending future funding.

== Previous proposals ==
These projects stem from past expansion and improvement studies, as well as service proposals from various constituencies, but none have been advanced or approved by the MBTA.

=== Extension studies ===
Two extensions of existing lines have been studied in the 2020s:

- Extension of the Middleborough/Lakeville Line to Buzzards Bay or Sagamore (both in Bourne) to serve Cape Cod was studied in 1997, and extension to Buzzards Bay was again studied in 2007. The extension was again proposed after the 2013 introduction of the CapeFLYER. The town of Bourne voted in 2015 to join the MBTA district. MassDOT began planning a possible commuter rail trial service in October 2015. The proposed service, which was to have shuttle trains between Bourne and Middleborough/Lakeville operated by Massachusetts Coastal Railroad, was rejected by the MBTA Fiscal Management and Control Board in April 2016. Middleborough station, which replaced Middleborough/Lakeville in 2025 when South Coast Rail service began, was built with space for a potential future platform for shuttle trains. A 2021 study analyzed two alternatives for service to Buzzards Bay or Bourne station. Middleborough–Buzzards Bay shuttle service with 7 daily round trips was expected to have 1,710 total daily boardings, while Middleborough–Bourne service with 10 daily round trips (including two off-peak Boston–Bourne round trips) was expected to have 2,540 total daily boardings.
- Extension of the Lowell Line to Manchester and Nashua, New Hampshire, has been proposed since the 1980–81 pilot service. The extension has been a politically contentious issue at the state level in New Hampshire, with Democratic politicians supporting the service and Republican politicians opposing it. A 2014 alternatives analysis recommended several possible services, including commuter rail to Nashua or Manchester or intercity rail to Concord, for further evaluation. Engineering and design work for commuter service to Manchester began in late 2020, and was completed in February 2023.

Several other extensions of existing lines and restoration of service to disused lines have been studied in the past:

- Extension of the Providence/Stoughton Line to Westerly, Rhode Island (studied in 2001 and 2017)
- Extension of the Franklin Line to Milford (studied in 1997) or Woonsocket, Rhode Island (studied in 2007)
- Restoration of service on the Millis Branch to Millis (studied in 1998)
- Restoration of service on the Milford Branch to Milford (studied in 1990 and 1997)
- Restoration of service on the Fitchburg Secondary to Marlborough (studied in 1990) or Northborough/I-290 (studied in 2002)
- Rerouting of some Framingham/Worcester Line service to North Station via the Grand Junction Branch (studied in 2012)
- Restoration of service on the Central Mass Branch to Berlin/I-495 (studied in 1996)
- Restoration of service on the Lexington Branch to Bedford (studied in 1985)
- Extension of the Fitchburg Line to Gardner (studied in 2005)
- Extension of the Haverhill Line to Plaistow, New Hampshire (studied in 2015)
- Extension of the Newburyport/Rockport Line to Portsmouth, New Hampshire (studied in 1988 and 1999)
- Restoration of service on the Peabody Branch between Salem and Danvers (studied in 2004)
- Restoration of service on the Manchester and Lawrence Branch between Lawrence, Massachusetts and Manchester, New Hampshire (studied in 2009)
- Restoration of service on the Dighton and Somerset Railroad between Stoughton and East Taunton (studied in 1988, 1990, 1995, 2007 and 2009)
- Extension of the Fall River/New Bedford Line to downtown Fall River near Battleship Cove (studied in 2008 and 2013)

=== Infill stations ===
Several infill stations on existing lines are proposed:

- West Station is a proposed Framingham/Worcester Line station to serve the Beacon Park Yard redevelopment.
- South Salem station is a proposed Newburyport/Rockport Line station near Salem State University.

=== North–South Rail Link ===
No direct connection exists between the two downtown commuter rail terminals; passengers must use the MBTA subway or other modes to transfer between the two halves of the system. (For non-revenue transfers of equipment, the MBTA and Amtrak use the Grand Junction Branch.) The proposed North–South Rail Link would add a new rail tunnel under downtown Boston to allow through-running service, with new underground stations at South Station, North Station, and possibly a new Central Station. A feasibility study was conducted in 2018.

== See also ==
- List of Massachusetts railroads
- East-West Passenger Rail
- Northern Tier Passenger Rail
