= MBTA bilevel cars =

Massachusetts passenger rail cars

MBTA Bilevel Cars
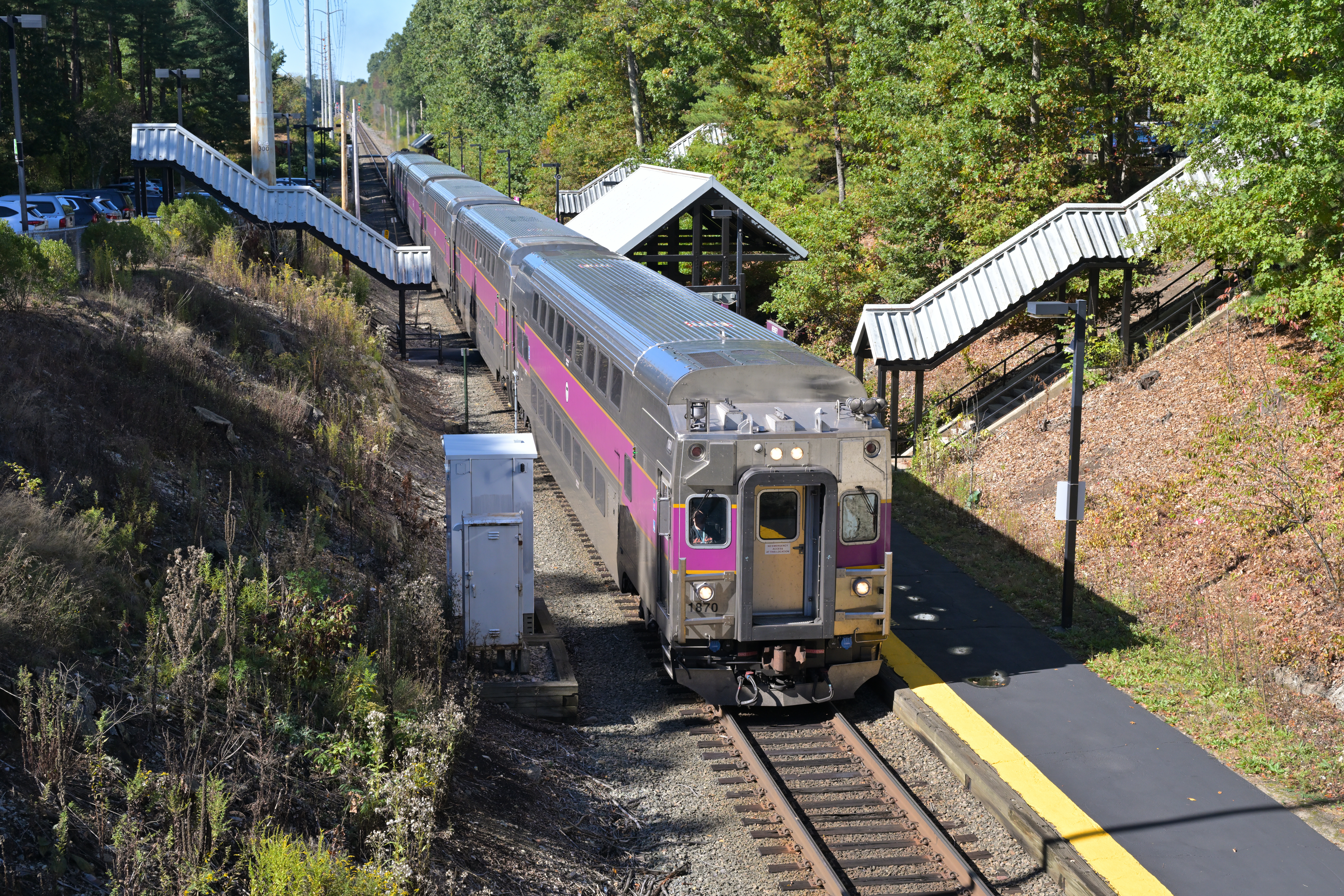
- An all-bilevel inbound Needham Line train arriving at Hersey in 2025, led by a CTC-5 cab car

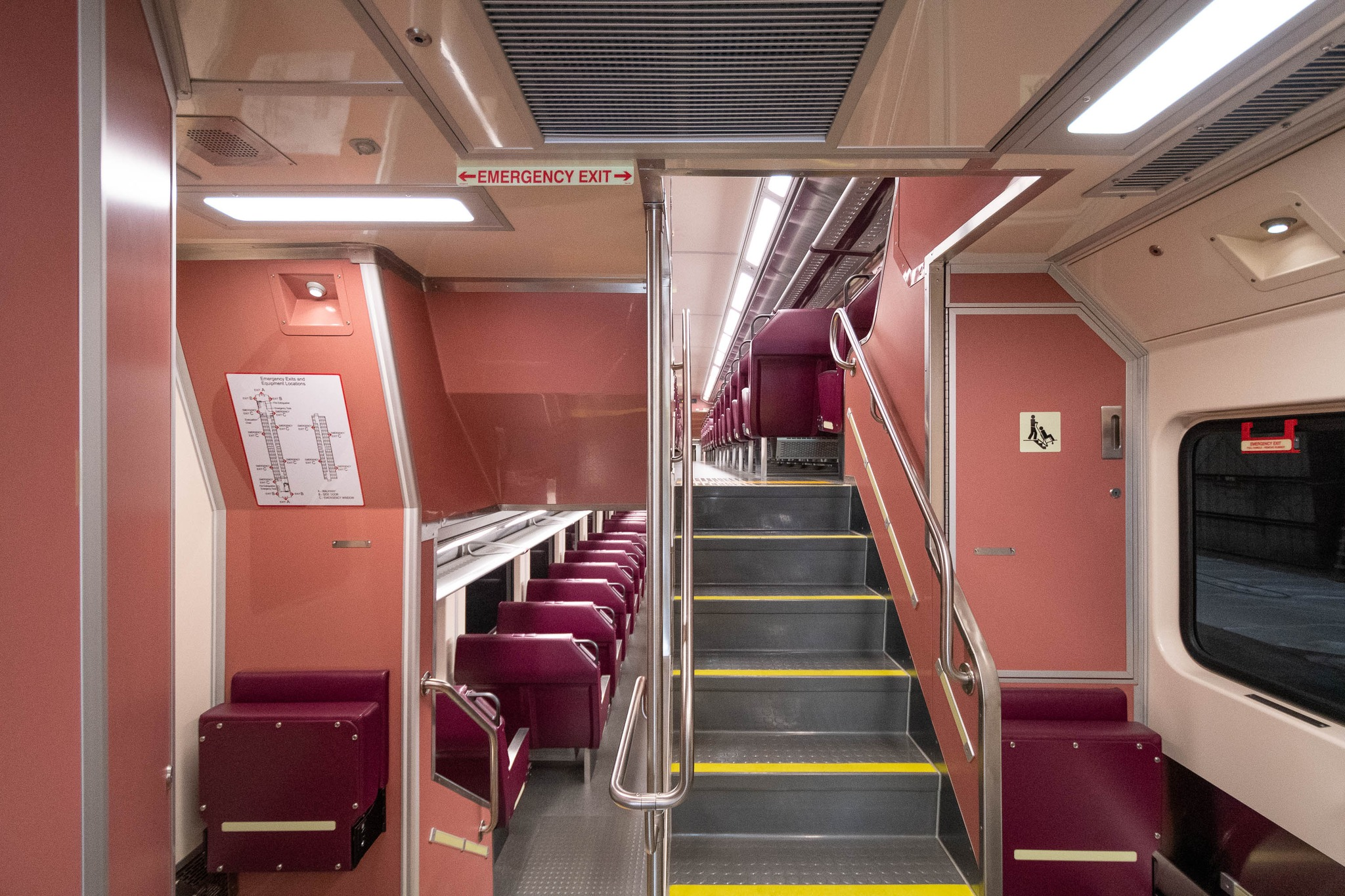
- The interior of a BTC-4D car, with all 3 decks visible
- Stock type: Coach
- Manufacturers: Kawasaki; Hyundai Rotem
- Constructed: 1990–2006 (Kawasaki cars); 2012–2027 (Hyundai-Rotem cars)
- Entered service: 1990
- Refurbished: 2014–2021 (Kawasaki cars)
- Number in service: 297 (80 currently on order)
- Fleet numbers: 700–749 (BTC-4); 750–766 (BTC-4A); 767–781 (BTC-4B); 900–932 (BTC-4C); 800–886 (BTC-4D); 1700–1724 (CTC-4); 1800–1870 (CTC-5)
- Capacity: 173–185
- Owner: Massachusetts Bay Transportation Authority
- Operator: Keolis Commuter Services

Specifications
- Car body construction: Stainless steel
- Car length: 85 feet 4 inches (26.01 m)
- Width: 10 feet (3.0 m)
- Height: 15 feet 6 inches (4.72 m)
- Track gauge: 4 ft 8 1/2 in (1,435 mm) standard gauge

The Massachusetts Bay Transportation Authority operates a fleet of approximately 300 bilevel railcars on its Commuter Rail system. The cars are manufactured to the MBTA's specification by Kawasaki Railcar Manufacturing and Hyundai Rotem, in 7 variants that include standard coaches and cab cars. The first cars entered service in 1990, and new cars are planned to be built until the late 2020s.

== History ==
In the early 1990s, the MBTA Commuter Rail was nearing vital service expansions across its system, with expansion of the Framingham Line to Worcester and the reopening of the Old Colony Lines being expected soon. Until the early 1990s, MBTA passenger equipment consisted solely of standard capacity single level cars, which were mostly cars of the BTC-1 series, a variant of the well-known 'Comet' series cars. The BTC-1A, BTC-1B and CTC-1B cars were relatively new at the time, being made by Bombardier in the late 1980s, and hosting a seating capacity of 122–127. The older variants of these cars, the BTC-1C fleet, were originally built as BTC-1 cars and CTC-1 control cab cars in the late 1970s by Pullman-Standard, and were rebuilt by Amerail into their current specs in 1996, these cars have a total seating capacity of 114.

The MBTA also had a unique fleet of coaches manufactured by Messerschmitt-Bölkow-Blohm (MBB), which were designated as BTC-3 and CTC-3 cars. These had considerably less seating capacity than the BTC-1 cars, ranging from 88 to 94, but were equipped with restrooms, and would be the only cars on the fleet to host this accommodation until 2005.

The MBTA's first delivery for new bilevel passenger equipment from Kawasaki consisted of 50 regular coaches (BTC-4), and 25 control cab cars (CTC-4). This order was later supplemented by 17 BTC-4A cars in 1997–98, and 15 BTC-4B cars in 2001–02. In 2005–06, with the opening of the Greenbush Line nearing, the MBTA took delivery of 33 BTC-4C coaches, these cars differed from all previously ordered bilevel cars in that they were equipped with restrooms. The BTC-4C cars would also be their final order from Kawasaki. The Kawasaki cars are also referred to as the "K-cars", for short.

In 2008, the South Korean rolling stock company Hyundai Rotem won a $170 million contract to construct the MBTA's latest order for more bilevel cars. The new order consisted of 47 BTC-4D cars, and 28 CTC-5 control cars, which were the first bilevel control cab cars to be put into service since the original CTC-4s in 1990. These cars first began to arrive in 2012, and featured various technological improvements over the older cars, such as interior and exterior LED displays, and fully automatic door control, which had been unused in the older cars, eliminating the need for a conductor to be present at every opening door.

In 2012, the MBTA reached an agreement for Alstom to overhaul 74 bilevel cars of the entire BTC-4 and CTC-4 fleets in Hornell, New York, with the only exclusion being CTC-4 #1710, which sustained severe damage in a 2006 accident. The contract also provided an option to overhaul the entirety of the BTC-4A and BTC-4B fleets, as well as the previously excluded CTC-4 #1710. The rebuilding of the BTC-4 and CTC-4 fleets took place from 2014 to 2019, with the rebuilding of the BTC-4A and BTC-4B fleets subsequently starting in 2019, and eventually being completed in 2021. Despite the MBTA choosing to go ahead with the extra option in the contract, CTC-4 #1710 was never rebuilt, and was scrapped in 2014. The upgrades to the rebuilt K-cars included interior and exterior LED displays, automatic door control, new trucks and couplers, and other modifications that made them nearly indistinguishable from the Hyundai Rotem cars.

In 2019, the MBTA indicated plans to fully replace its fleet of 260 single-level cars, which would require a total of 181 bilevel cars to maintain the system's total seating capacity. The MBB cars in particular were outlined as needing replacement as soon as possible. A total of 80 bilevel cars were ordered by the MBTA to provide immediate relief for the retirement of the MBB cars and for the completion of the South Coast Rail project to extend service to Fall River and New Bedford, which alone required 16 new bilevel cars, the first of these cars arrived on MBTA property in late 2022. This order was later increased to 83 cars. Eventually, the MBTA plans to order over 200 additional bilevel cars to completely replace the rest of the single-level fleet, and to support projected ridership increases in the coming years.

== Blind Trailer Coaches ==
Specification	Builder	Year built	Car numbers	Number active	Seats	Notes	Image
BTC-4	Kawasaki	1990–91	700–749	50	185	Overhauled by Alstom 2014–19	
BTC-4A	Kawasaki	1997–98	750–766	17	182	Overhauled by Alstom 2019–21	
BTC-4B	Kawasaki	2001–02	767–781	15	182	Overhauled by Alstom 2019–21	
BTC-4C	Kawasaki	2005–06	900–932	33	178	Restroom-equipped	
BTC-4D	Hyundai Rotem	2012–14	800–846	47	179	Restroom-equipped	
BTC-4D	Hyundai Rotem	2022–24	847–886	40	179	Restroom-equipped	
BTC-4D	Hyundai Rotem	2026–27	400–469	0	179	Restroom-equipped 70 on order Deliveries due to begin 2026	

== Control Trailer Coaches ==
Specification	Builder	Year built	Car numbers	Number active	Seats	Notes	Image
CTC-4	Kawasaki	1990–91	1700–1724	24	175	Overhauled by Alstom 2014–19	
CTC-5	Hyundai Rotem	2012–14	1800–1827	28	173		
CTC-5	Hyundai Rotem	2022–24	1828–1870	43	173		
CTC-5	Hyundai Rotem	2026–27	1400–1409	0	173	10 on order Deliveries due to begin 2026	
