= East Side (Melrose) =

- Neighborhood
- Interactive map of East Side
- Coordinates: 42°27′31″N 71°03′01″W
- Country: United States
- State: Massachusetts
- County: Middlesex
- City: Melrose
- Time zone: UTC-5 (Eastern)
  - Summer (DST): UTC-4 (Eastern)
- ZIP code: 02176
- Area code: 339 / 781
- Website: http://www.cityofmelrose.org

The East Side is a Melrose, Massachusetts neighborhood located on the east side of the city. It stretches roughly from Lebanon Street east to the Saugus, Massachusetts line and is positioned in between the Mount Hood Golf Club neighborhood (to the south) and the Horace Mann neighborhood (to the north).

== Description ==
The area was mostly built out in the early twentieth century with a large majority of the houses being Colonials and Victorians.

A very popular spot in the East Side is the Melrose Common. The park consists of two softball fields, a basketball court, and a playground. The park is the only one of its kind in Melrose and serves as a central meeting place for citywide activities such as summer programs and Fourth of July festivities.

The East Side also contains the two Melrose golf courses. One being Bellevue Golf Course, which is a 9-hole country club. The other golf course is named Mount Hood Golf Club The course consists of 18 holes and is a popular spot for sledding and ice skating in the winter.

== Education ==
The East Side contains two Kindergarten to fifth grade elementary schools operated by Melrose Public Schools: Winthrop School and Hoover School.

== Transportation ==
The East Side is the closest Melrose neighborhood to Saugus and US Route 1. It is served by MBTA bus route 131.
