= Melrose, Massachusetts =

- City
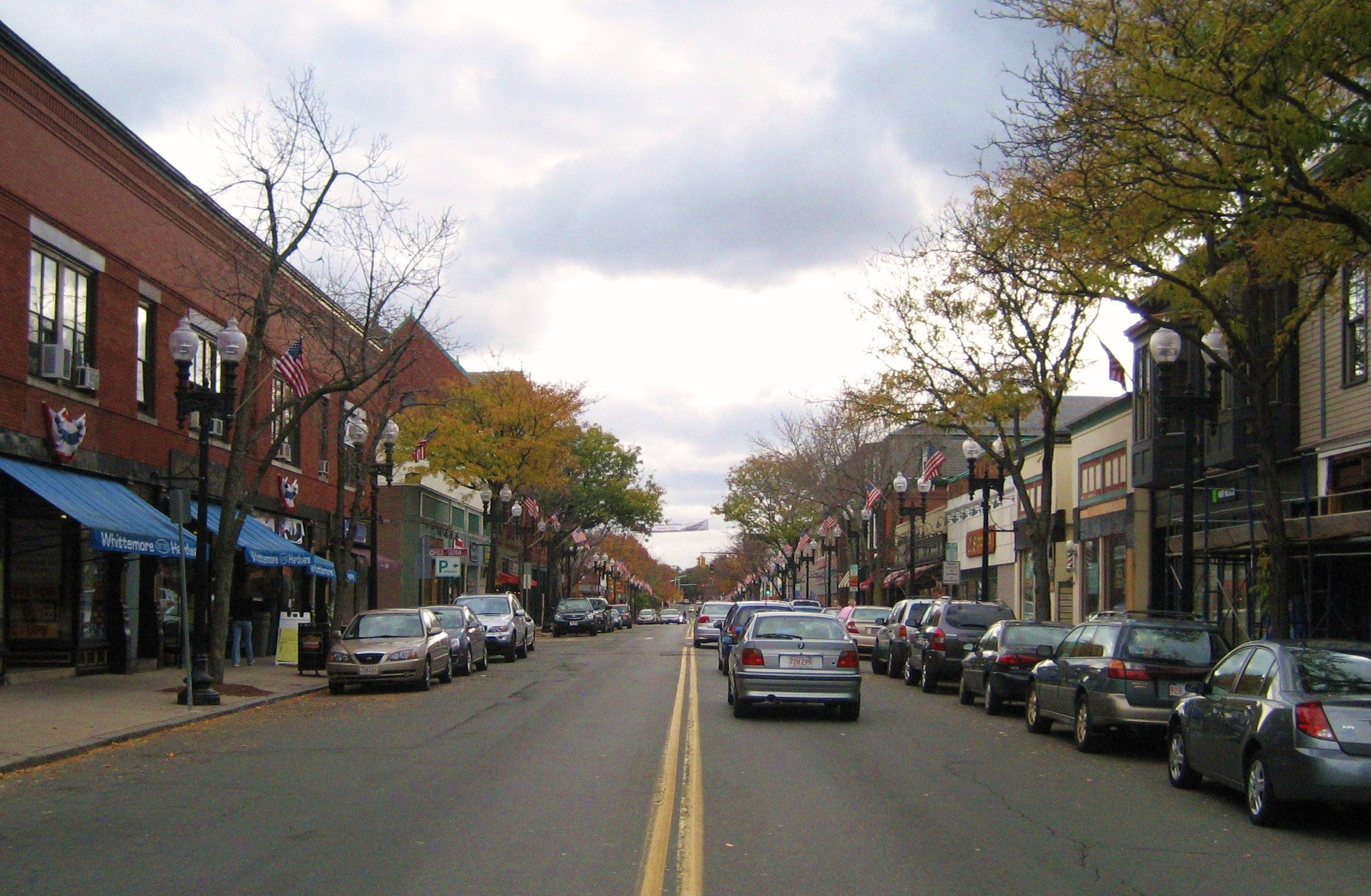
- Downtown Melrose

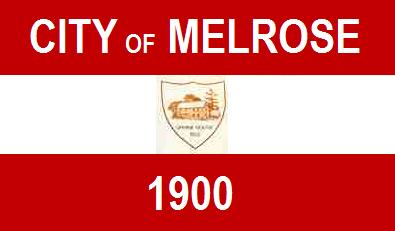
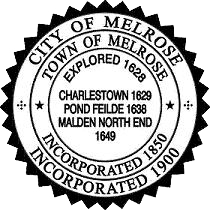
- Flag Seal
- Motto: One Community Open to All
- Location in Middlesex County in Massachusetts

- Location in the United States
- Coordinates: 42°27′30″N 71°04′00″W
- Country: United States
- State: Massachusetts
- County: Middlesex
- Settled: 1629
- Incorporated: 1850
- City: 1900

Government
  - Type: Mayor-council city
  - Mayor: Jennifer Grigoraitis

Area
  - Total: 4.77 sq mi (12.35 km^{2})
  - Land: 4.68 sq mi (12.13 km^{2})
  - Water: 0.085 sq mi (0.22 km^{2})
- Elevation: 135 ft (41 m)

Population (2020)
  - Total: 29,817
  - Density: 6,366.4/sq mi (2,458.07/km^{2})
- Time zone: UTC−5 (Eastern)
  - Summer (DST): UTC−4 (Eastern)
- ZIP Code: 02176
- Area code: 339/781
- FIPS code: 25-40115
- GNIS feature ID: 0612780
- Website: www.cityofmelrose.org

Melrose is a city located in the Greater Boston metropolitan area in Middlesex County, Massachusetts, United States. Its population as of the 2020 census was 29,817. It is a suburb located approximately seven miles north of Boston. It is situated in the center of the triangle created by Interstates 93, 95 and U.S. Route 1.

The land that comprises Melrose was first settled in 1628 and was once part of Charlestown and then Malden. It became the Town of Melrose in 1850 and then the City of Melrose in 1900.

== History ==
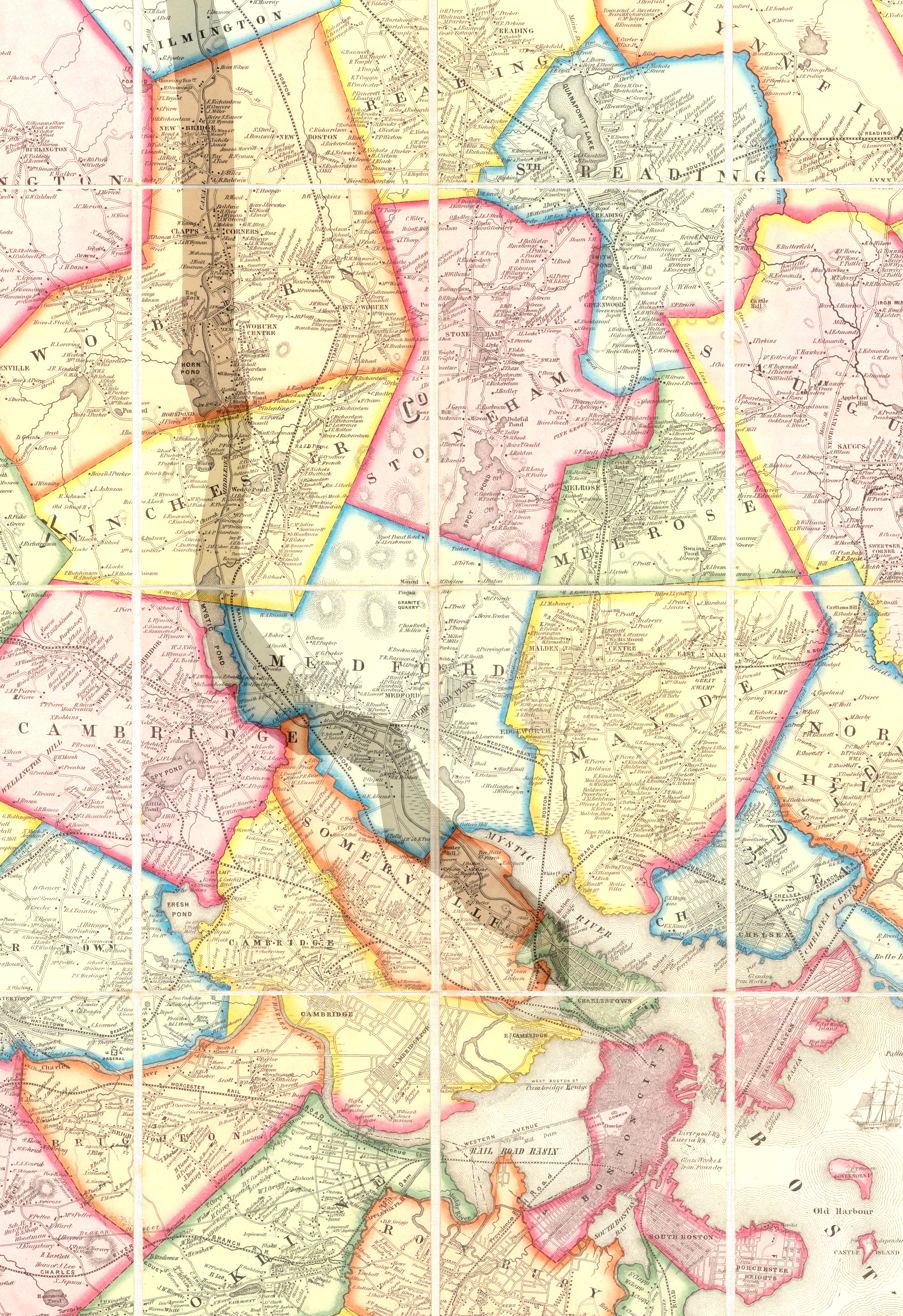
1852 map of Boston area showing Melrose and rail lines

Melrose was originally called "Ponde Fielde" for its abundance of ponds and streams or "Mystic Side" because of its location in a valley north of the Mystic River. The area was first explored by Richard and Ralph Sprague in 1628 and became part of Charlestown in 1633 along with a large area of land encompassing most of the surrounding communities.

In 1649, the neighborhood of Charlestown known as Malden was incorporated as a separate town; the new town of Malden included most of present-day Melrose (then called North Malden) within its borders. North Malden largely remained a lightly populated farming community. By 1845, the Boston and Maine Railroad had built three stops (now the commuter rail stations of Wyoming Hill, Melrose/Cedar Park, and Melrose Highlands). Boston workers in search of a country atmosphere moved to the area and began commuting to work. The population of North Malden began growing, and in 1850 North Malden split from Malden proper and was incorporated as the town of Melrose. The town then annexed the highlands from neighboring Stoneham in 1853, creating the city's current borders. The name "Melrose" comes from the burgh of Melrose, Scotland. It was a reference to the Eildon hills of Melrose, Scotland, which the new town resembled. The name was suggested and advocated for by William Bogle, a Scotland native and longtime resident of North Malden.

The population of Melrose continued to grow throughout the second half of the nineteenth century. Farmland was increasingly partitioned into smaller parcels for residences and businesses. The fire department and the town's school district were founded, and the town hall was built in 1873. In 1899, the City of Melrose became the 33rd incorporated city in Massachusetts. Levi S. Gould became the city's first mayor on January 1, 1900. Melrose reached a peak in a population of 33,180 residents in 1970, before beginning a slow decline continuing through 2010. On April 1, 1982, Downtown Melrose was added to the National Register of Historic Places; the public library was similarly added to the register in 1988.

== Geography ==
Melrose is located at 42°27′33″N 71°3′44″W (42.459045, −71.062339).

According to the United States Census Bureau, the city has a total area of 4.8 square miles (12 km^{2}), of which 4.7 square miles (12 km^{2}) is land and 0.1 square miles (0.26 km^{2}), or 1.26%, is water. The city's largest body of water is Ell Pond, situated near the center of the city, while other major bodies are Swains Pond and Towners Pond, located on the east side near Mount Hood Golf Club.

Melrose is approximately 7 miles (11 km) north of Boston, Massachusetts. It borders four cities and towns: Malden, Saugus, Stoneham, and Wakefield. Major geographic features include Ell Pond, Swains Pond, Sewall Woods, Mount Hood, Boston Rock, Pine Banks Park, and the eastern reaches of the Middlesex Fells Reservation.

The writer Elizabeth George Speare, who was born in Melrose, wrote of her hometown: "Melrose was an ideal place in which to have grown up, close to fields and woods where we hiked and picnicked, and near to Boston where we frequently had family treats of theaters and concerts."

=== Neighborhoods ===
- Cedar Park
- Downtown Melrose
- East Side
- Horace Mann
- Melrose Highlands
- Mount Hood
- Oak Grove/Pine Banks
- Wyoming
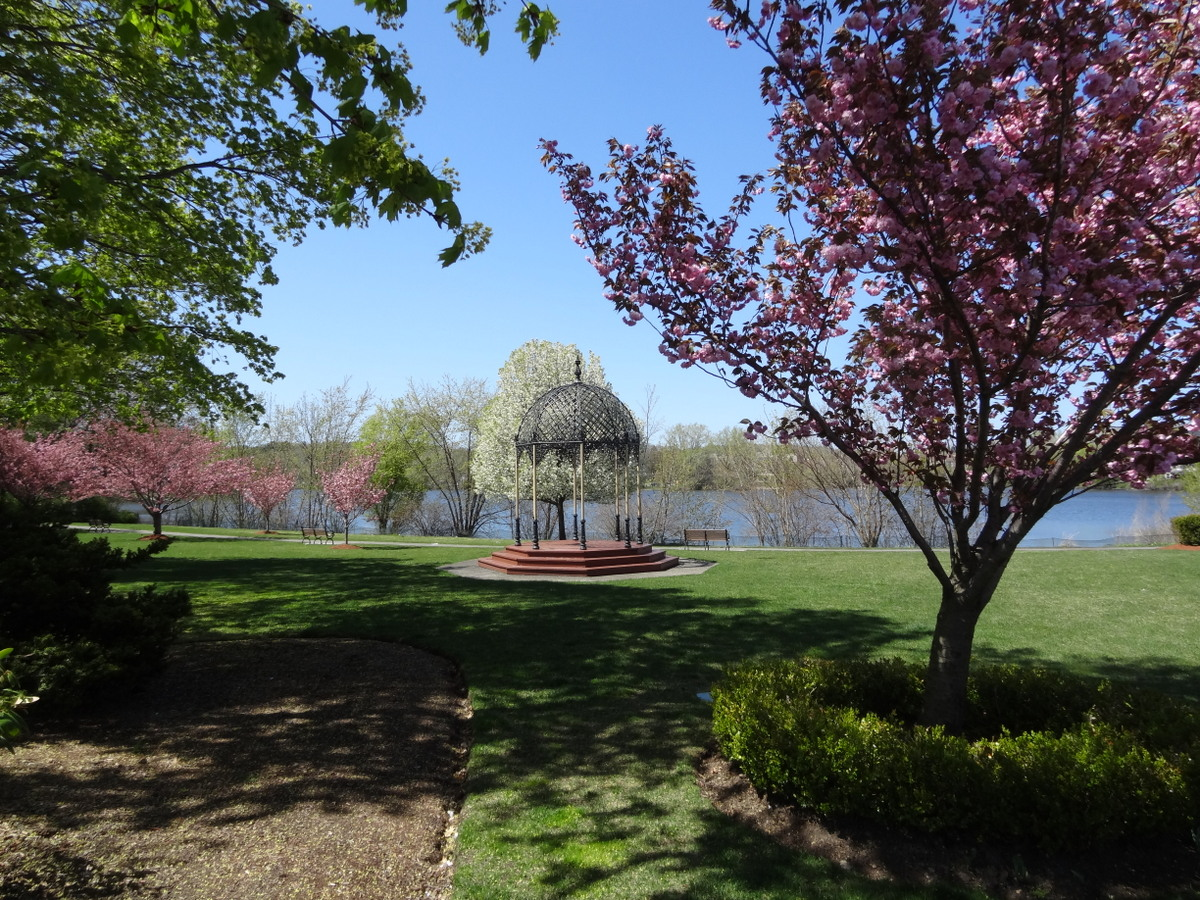
The Gazebo at Ell Pond Park

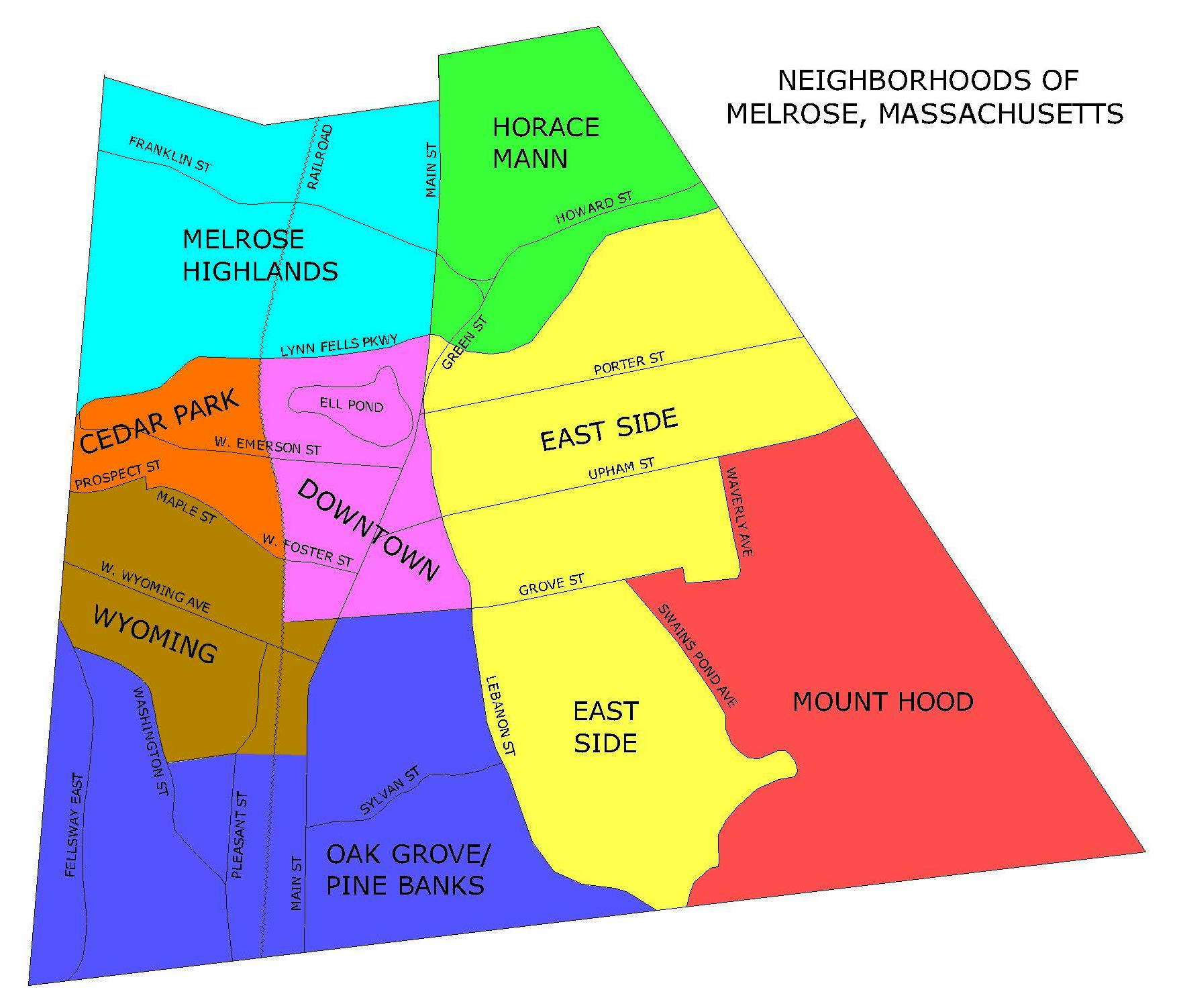
The neighborhoods of Melrose

Melrose Highlands Congregational Church, a church in Melrose Highlands, 2026

== Government ==
Jennifer Grigoraitis is the Mayor of Melrose as of January 8, 2024, taking over for Paul Brodeur who had served since November 2019. Melrose is represented by Jason Lewis (D) in the Massachusetts Senate. Melrose is part of the fifth Congressional district of Massachusetts, and is represented by Katherine Clark (D). The current U.S. senators from Massachusetts are Edward J. Markey (D) and Elizabeth Warren (D).

Melrose is served by an eleven-member City council. The entire city elects four At-Large City Councilors and seven Ward Councilors, elected by voters in their wards. Beginning in the 2007 election, the mayor's position became a four-year term (from two) and was given a seat on the School Committee. All councilors are elected to two-year terms. City elections are held in odd-numbered years.

Voter Registration and Party Enrollment as of August 24, 2024
Party	Number of Voters	Percentage
Democratic	6,656	30.65%
Republican	1,552	7.15%
Unenrolled	13,340	61.44%
Other	166	0.76%
Total	21,714	100%

== Demographics ==
Historical population
Year	Pop.	±%
1850	1,260	—
1860	2,532	+101.0%
1870	3,414	+34.8%
1880	4,560	+33.6%
1890	8,519	+86.8%
1900	12,962	+52.2%
1910	15,715	+21.2%
1920	18,204	+15.8%
1930	23,170	+27.3%
1940	25,333	+9.3%
1950	26,988	+6.5%
1960	29,619	+9.7%
1970	33,180	+12.0%
1980	30,055	−9.4%
1990	28,150	−6.3%
2000	27,134	−3.6%
2010	26,983	−0.6%
2020	29,817	+10.5%
2024*	29,938	+0.4%
* = population estimate. Source: United States census records and Population Estimates Program data. Source: U.S. Decennial Census

=== 2020 census ===
As of the 2020 census, Melrose had a population of 29,817. The median age was 40.7 years. 20.9% of residents were under the age of 18 and 17.8% of residents were 65 years of age or older. For every 100 females there were 90.6 males, and for every 100 females age 18 and over there were 88.1 males age 18 and over.

100.0% of residents lived in urban areas, while 0.0% lived in rural areas.

There were 12,141 households in Melrose, of which 30.5% had children under the age of 18 living in them. Of all households, 53.2% were married-couple households, 14.4% were households with a male householder and no spouse or partner present, and 26.9% were households with a female householder and no spouse or partner present. About 28.6% of all households were made up of individuals and 13.8% had someone living alone who was 65 years of age or older.

There were 12,614 housing units, of which 3.7% were vacant. The homeowner vacancy rate was 0.7% and the rental vacancy rate was 4.5%.

Racial composition as of the 2020 census
Race	Number	Percent
White	24,004	80.5%
Black or African American	968	3.2%
American Indian and Alaska Native	32	0.1%
Asian	2,220	7.4%
Native Hawaiian and Other Pacific Islander	8	0.0%
Some other race	514	1.7%
Two or more races	2,071	6.9%
Hispanic or Latino (of any race)	1,353	4.5%

== Education ==
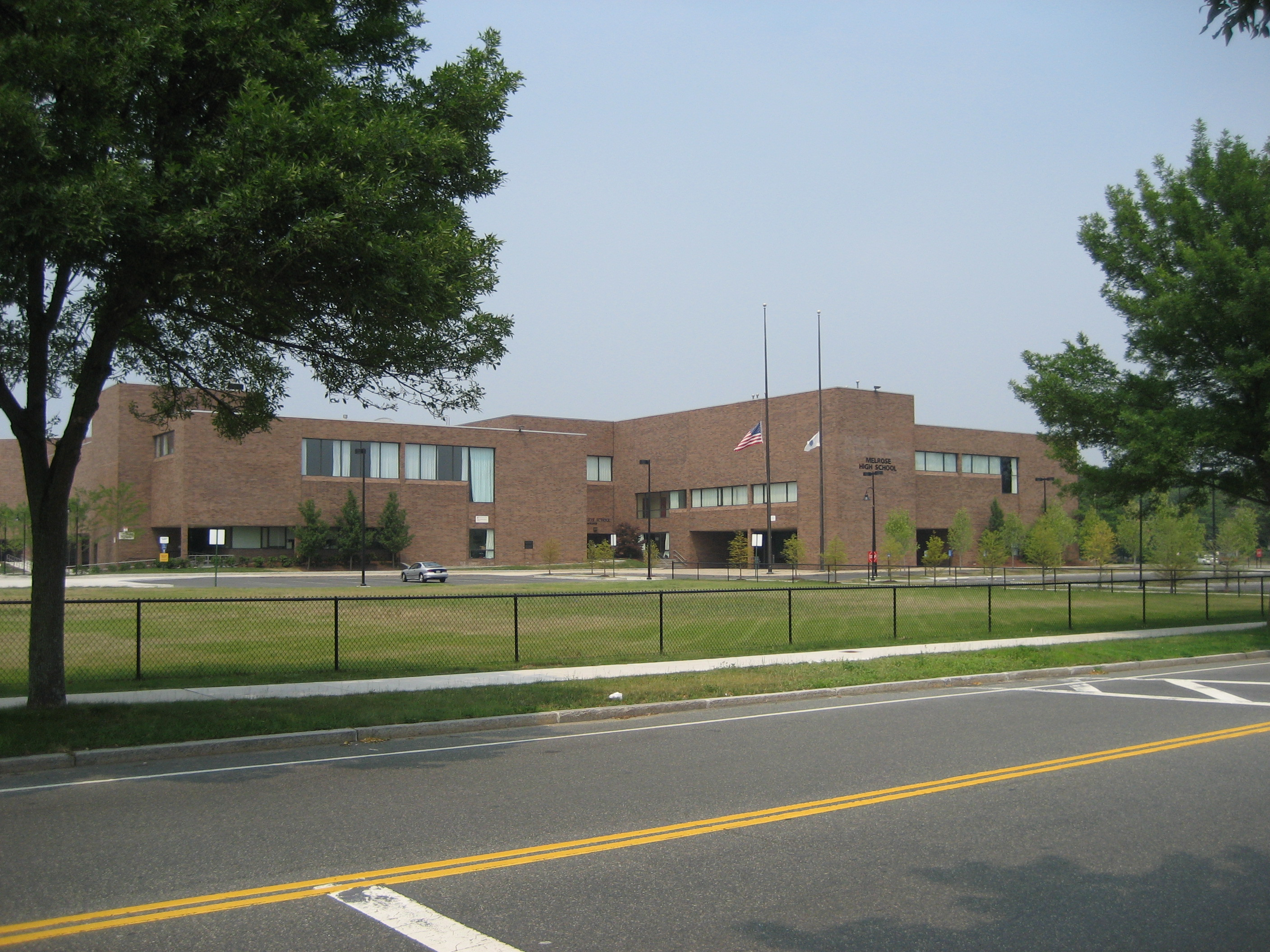
Melrose High School as seen from Lynn Fells Parkway

The Melrose School district runs several schools including The Franklin Early Childhood Center, five elementary schools (Roosevelt, Lincoln, Winthrop, Hoover, and Horace Mann), Melrose Veterans Memorial Middle School (MVMMS), and Melrose High School. The city also has a private elementary school, St. Mary of the Annunciation, run by one of the city's Catholic churches of the same name. The Franklin Early Childhood Center houses preschool, Pre-K, and multiage programs. MVMMS is a school to about one thousand eleven- through fourteen-year-olds and was the winner of the 2002 Massachusetts Department of Education's Compass School Award, the 2007 Massachusetts Technology Collaborative's Green School Award (for its use of solar energy), and the 2008 New England League of Middle Schools' Spotlight School Award.

== Health care ==
There are many health care facilities located in Melrose. MelroseWakefield Hospital, a 234-bed non-profit hospital, was home to the world's first cochlear implant and laser surgery and it was among the first hospitals in the country to offer same day surgery. In addition to the hospital, there are many pediatricians, specialists, dentists and dermatologists. Also, the city's Milano Senior Center provides social, recreational, health, and educational programs for Melrose's senior citizens.

== Transportation ==
Although the only highway in Melrose is a short section of Route 99, the city has access to many nearby highways including Route 1 in Saugus, Interstate 93 in Stoneham, Massachusetts Route 16 in Everett, and Route 128/Interstate 95 in Wakefield. The city is also served by the Massachusetts Bay Transportation Authority (MBTA). It has three stations served by the Haverhill Line of the MBTA Commuter Rail system: Melrose Highlands, Melrose/Cedar Park, and Wyoming Hill. Melrose is also served by MBTA bus routes 131, 132, and 137. Oak Grove station on the Orange Line of the MBTA subway system is located in Malden near the Melrose border.

== Media ==
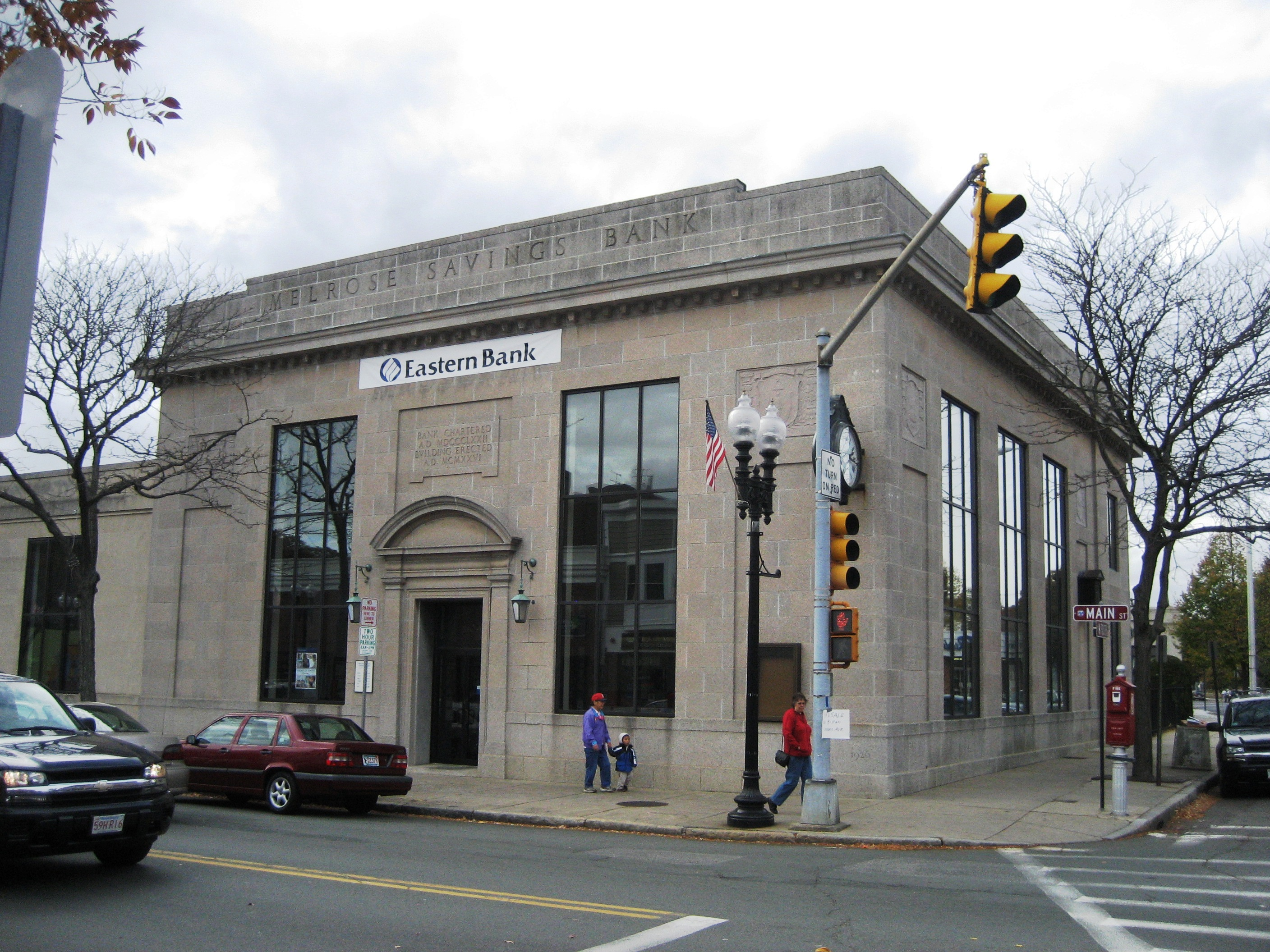
Former MassBank building downtown which was used for a bank scene in the movie The Town (2010)

Melrose has a weekly newspaper, the Melrose Weekly News, while there was formerly a second print newspaper, the Melrose Free Press, which after a brief stint as the online-only Melrose Free Press Observer, merged with the Saugus Advertizer to become The Free Press & Advertizer in 2022. There is also a daily online news site, Melrose Patch. Melrose Massachusetts Television (MMTV) is a Public-access television cable TV station available to all customers and broadcasts Government-access television (GATV) community notices as well as resident produced Public-access television cable TV content.

In the fall of 2009, the Ben Affleck movie The Town captured many key scenes in a historic bank on Main Street downtown, while around the same time, Cameron Diaz and Tom Cruise's movie Knight & Day shot scenes on the Fellsway. The same month, a documentary for PBS about the Scopes Trial was also shot in the Aldermanic Chamber of Melrose City Hall. In 2022, the Apple TV+ movie Spirited, featuring Ryan Reynolds and Will Ferrell, had scenes filmed in Melrose. In 2023, the Warner Bros. film Beetlejuice Beetlejuice, directed by Tim Burton, also filmed scenes in Melrose.

On September 22, 2016, Melrose was again named one of the "hottest zip codes" in the nation by Realtor.com. It had been number one in the nation in 2015 before falling to number seven in 2016. Also, as of December 2023, CartoChrome rated Melrose to have one of the top 13 percent of ZIP Codes (02176) in the United States for a resident living in the area to access health care, because of its hospital system, physician density, and ease of patients accessing a doctor from travel distance. The average distance a patient travels to a doctor is 0.93 miles.

== See also ==
- Melrose Symphony Orchestra
- National Register of Historic Places listings in Middlesex County, Massachusetts
- Pine Banks
- Middlesex Fells Reservation
- Mount Hood Golf Club
