= MassBank =

MassBank may refer to:

- MassBank Corp., a corporation bought by Eastern Bank, a bank in Massachusetts, United States
- MassBank (database), a mass spectral database described at mass spectrometry software
