= Marshall M. Sloane =

American businessman (1926–2019)

Marshall M. Sloane (April 15, 1926 – April 6, 2019) was an American businessman who was the founder and chairman of Century Bank.

== Biography ==
In 1969, Sloane founded Century Bank. He was a Trustee of Boston University, his alma mater (Questrom School of Business). In 2007, he stepped down as Chair of Boston University School of Dental Medicine Board of Visitors after 17 years. Sloane was awarded the Boy Scouts of America's Silver Buffalo Award. Sloane served on the BSA National Executive Board, the organization's governing board.

Sloane died on April 6, 2019, nine days before his 93rd birthday.
