= Wyoming Hill station =

Train station in Melrose, Massachusetts, US

Wyoming Hill
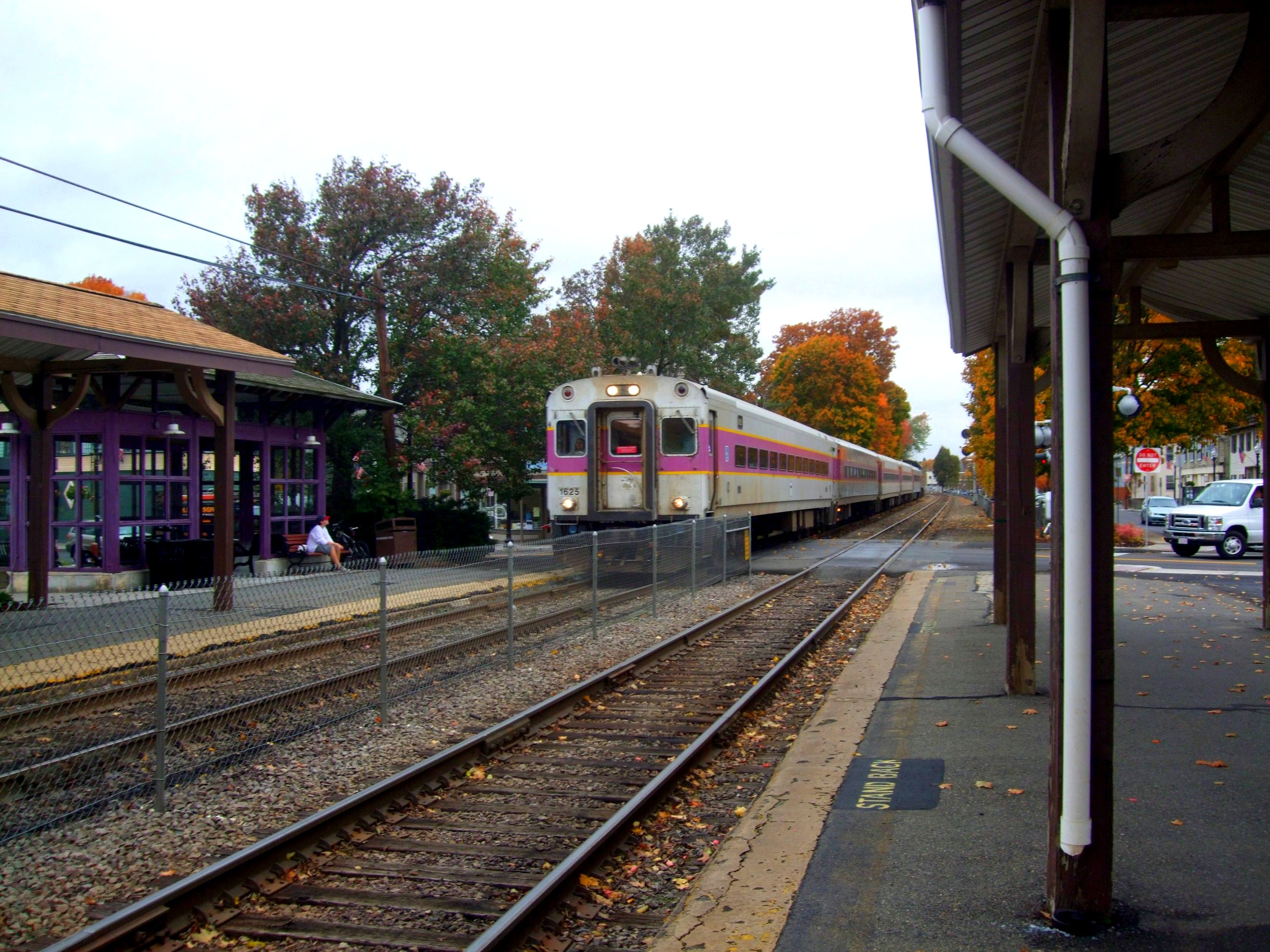
- An inbound train at Wyoming Hill station in 2010

General information
- Location: 40 West Wyoming Avenue; Melrose, Massachusetts
- Coordinates: 42.4519°N 71.0694°W
- Owner: City of Melrose
- Line: Western Route
- Platforms: 2 side platforms
- Tracks: 2
- Connections: MBTA bus: 131, 132, 137

Construction
- Parking: 28 spaces
- Cycle facilities: yes
- Accessible: No

Other information
- Fare zone: 1

History
- Opened: c. 1845
- Rebuilt: 2026 (planned)
- Former names: Boardman's Crossing (c. 1845–1850s); Wyoming (1850s–c. 1978)

Passengers
- 2024: 51 daily boardings

Services
Preceding station	MBTA	Following station
Oak Grove toward North Station	Haverhill Line	Melrose/Cedar Park toward Haverhill
Location

Wyoming Hill station is an MBTA Commuter Rail station on the Haverhill Line, located in Wyoming Square near downtown Melrose, Massachusetts. The station has two low-level side platforms and is not accessible; accessible platforms are planned to be installed in 2026. Wyoming Hill, in addition to the two other commuter rail stops in Melrose, was originally intended to be an extension of the Orange Line further north to Reading, Massachusetts.

== History ==
=== Boston and Maine Railroad ===
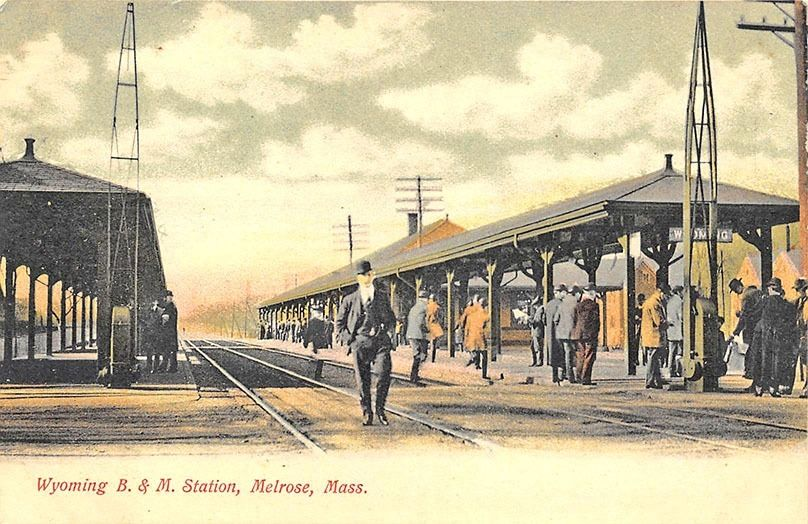
Early-20th-century postcard of the station

The Boston and Maine Railroad (B&M) opened its line from Wilmington Junction to Boston on July 1, 1845. Boardman's Crossing station opened on Wyoming Avenue in North Malden by 1850. It was named for Joseph Boardman, who lived nearby; the street was named for the Wyoming Valley in Pennsylvania. North Malden split from Malden in 1850, becoming Melrose, due to development around the rail line. A station building was erected in late 1851, at which time the station was renamed Wyoming By the 1870s, the station building was located on the west side of the tracks just south of Wyoming Avenue.

The B&M began construction of a new station building about 100 feet (30 m) to the south in July 1900. The new station was built of light buff-colored brick, with red Longmeadow sandstone as trim and a slate roof. It was 55 feet (17 m) long and 30 feet (9.1 m) wide, with a 28-foot (8.5 m)-square waiting room finished in brick and quartered oak. A 250-foot (76 m)-long awning was built on the track side of the station, with a 350-foot (110 m) long awning on the opposite platform. The architect was Henry B. Fletcher. The new station opened on February 24, 1901, at a final cost of $25,000 (equivalent to $770,000 in 2025).

=== MBTA era ===
Mini-high platforms under construction in 2026

The station building was partially converted to a warehouse by 1962, and was demolished by 1977. The MBTA, formed in 1964 to subsidize suburban commuter rail service, began funding Reading Line service on January 18, 1965. Around 1978, the MBTA modified the names of several stations for clarity, with Wyoming station becoming Wyoming Hill. Rail service on the inner Haverhill Line was suspended from September 9 to November 5, 2023, to accommodate signal work. Substitute bus service was operated between Reading and Oak Grove, serving all intermediate stops.

In 2024, the MBTA tested a temporary freestanding accessible platform design at Beverly Depot. These platforms do not require alterations to the existing platforms, thus skirting federal rules requiring full accessibility renovations when stations are modified, and were intended to provide interim accessibility at lower cost pending full reconstruction. Wyoming Hill was planned to be part of the second set of non-accessible stations to be modified with the temporary platforms. Funding for design and construction came from Fair Share Amendment revenues. Design work began in the first half of 2024. As of October 2026, the accessible platforms at Wyoming Hill are expected to be complete by the end of 2026.
