= Melrose Highlands, Massachusetts =

Melrose Highlands
- Neighborhood
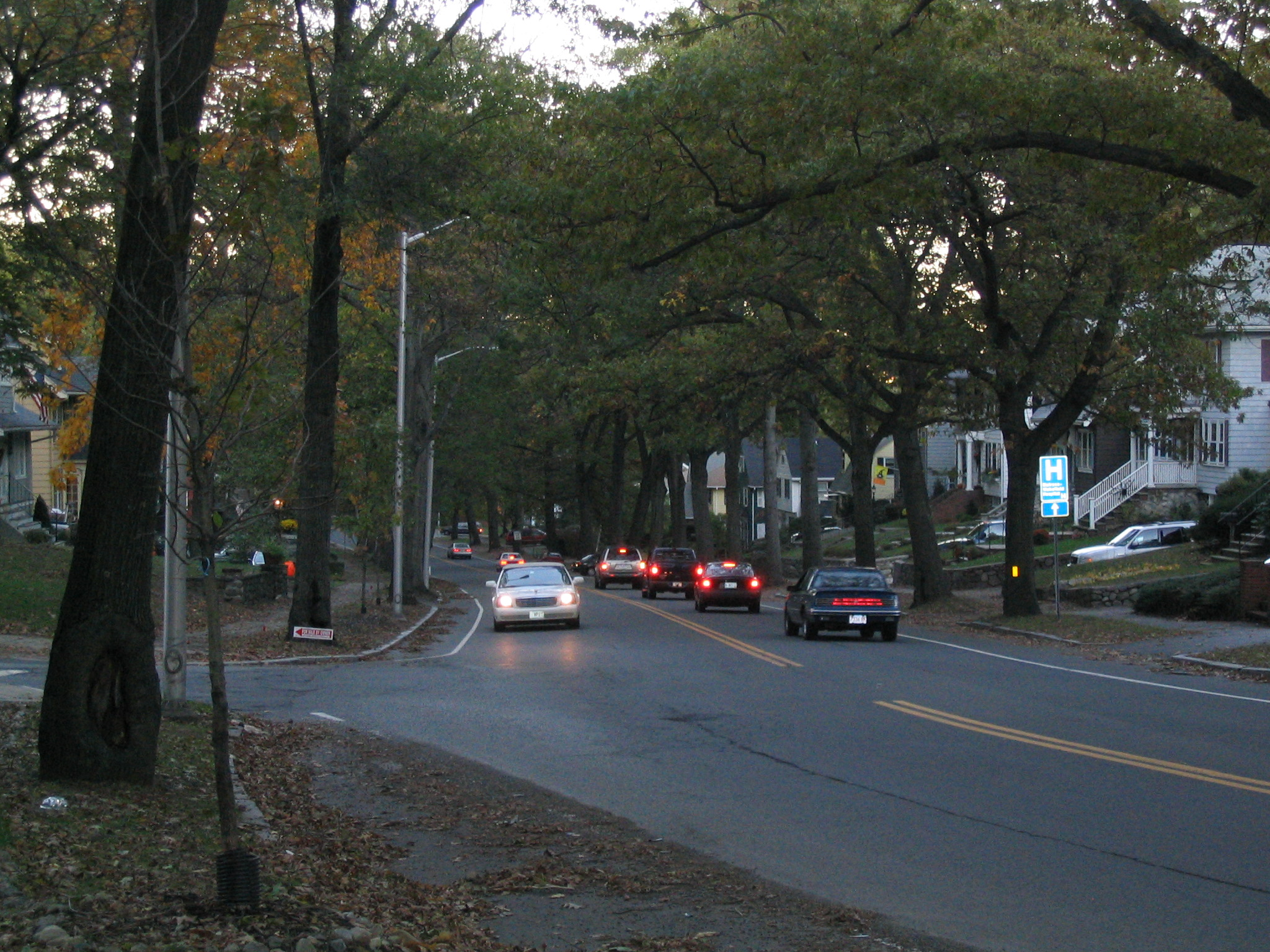
- Lynn Fells Parkway as it enters Melrose Highlands
- Interactive map of Melrose Highlands
- Coordinates: 42°28′07″N 71°04′11″W
- Country: United States
- State: Massachusetts
- County: Middlesex
- City: Melrose
- Time zone: UTC-5 (Eastern)
  - Summer (DST): UTC-4 (Eastern)
- ZIP Code: 02176 (Melrose)
- Area code: 339 / 781
- Website: www.cityofmelrose.org

A view of Melrose Highlands Congregational Church in Melrose Highlands, near the corner of Ashland Street and West Highland Avenue, as seen in September 2026

Melrose Highlands is one of the oldest neighborhoods in the city of Melrose, in Middlesex County, Massachusetts, United States. Formerly part of neighboring Stoneham, it became part of Melrose in the latter part of the nineteenth century. There were some addresses that had the zip code 02177, before the Highlands post office was closed; the Melrose zip code of 02176 is now used, although mail marked as 02177 is still deliverable.

It is bordered by Main Street and Melrose’s Horace Mann neighborhood to the east, the Stoneham border to the west, Lynn Fells Parkway to the south, and the Wakefield line and Wakefield's Greenwood neighborhood to the north. The neighborhood was originally part of Stoneham, but was annexed by Melrose on March 18, 1853.

== Transportation ==
Melrose Highlands is served by Melrose Highlands station on the Haverhill Line of the MBTA Commuter Rail system, as well as MBTA bus route 131.
