= Melrose/Cedar Park station =

Train station in Melrose, Massachusetts

Melrose-Cedar Park
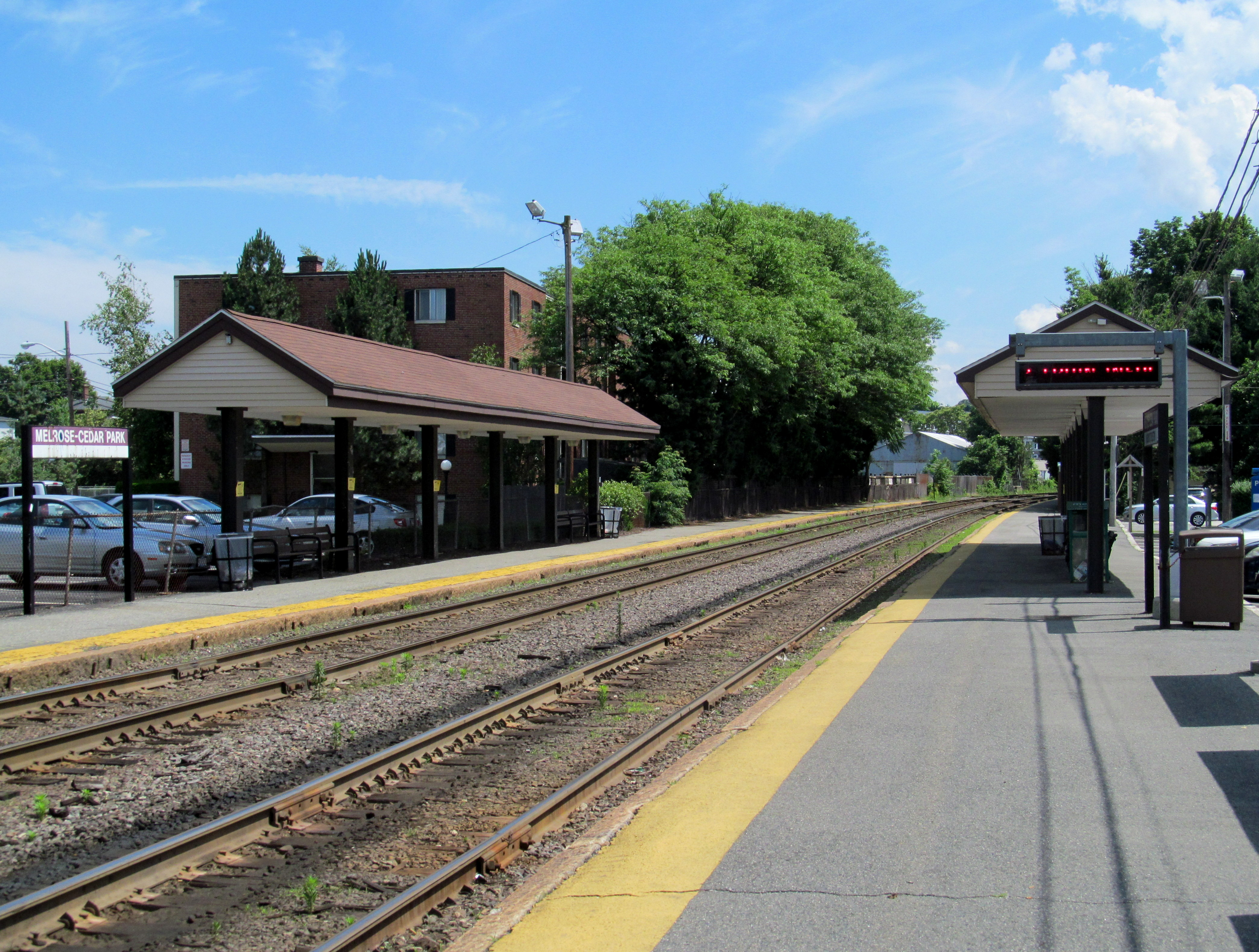
- Shelters at Melrose/Cedar Park station in June 2012

General information
- Location: Cedar Park at West Emerson Street; Melrose, Massachusetts
- Coordinates: 42.4588°N 71.0698°W
- Owner: City of Melrose
- Line: Western Route
- Platforms: 2 side platforms
- Tracks: 2

Construction
- Parking: 87 spaces ($3.00 fee)
- Accessible: No

Other information
- Fare zone: 1

History
- Opened: c. 1845
- Former names: North Malden (c. 1845–1850); Melrose (1850–c. 1978)

Passengers
- 2024: 63 daily boardings

Services
Preceding station	MBTA	Following station
Wyoming Hill toward North Station	Haverhill Line	Melrose Highlands toward Haverhill
Location

Melrose/Cedar Park station is an MBTA Commuter Rail station located in downtown Melrose, Massachusetts. The station has two low-level platforms serving the two tracks of the Haverhill Line; it is not accessible.

== History ==
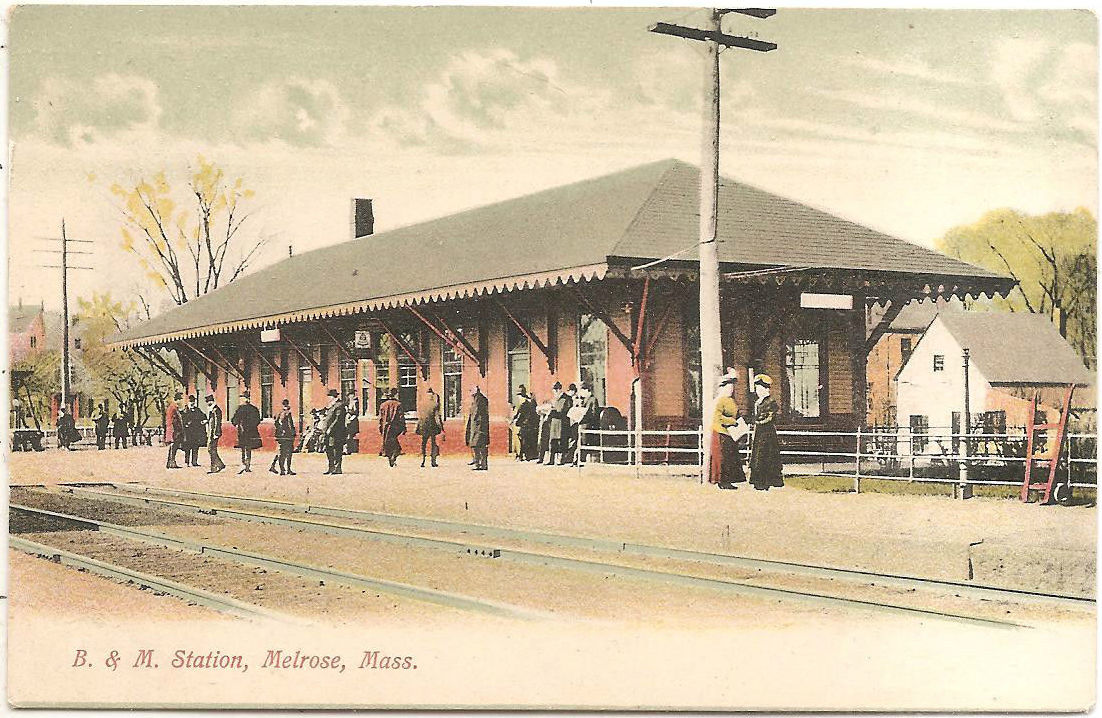
An early-20th-century postcard of Melrose station

The Boston and Maine Railroad (B&M) opened its line from Wilmington Junction to Boston on July 1, 1845. A station opened at Emerson Street in North Malden then or soon thereafter. The village was then sparsely populated; the station building also served as the post office and sometimes a churchroom. In 1850, the new development around the railroad prompted North Malden to split from Malden to form the town of Melrose. The station was quickly renamed Melrose as well.

Historically the primary station in Melrose, it has always been supplemented by nearby Wyoming Hill station and Melrose Highlands station. The original station was on the east side of the tracks; it was replaced by a newer station on the west side and converted for use as a freight house. Neither station building is extant, though sections of the platform roofs remain as shelters.

The MBTA, formed in 1964 to subsidize suburban commuter rail service, began funding Reading Line service on January 18, 1965. As with the other two MBTA rail stations in Melrose, it would have become a station on the Orange Line extension north to Reading, had that project not been cancelled due to lack of funding. Around 1978, the MBTA modified the names of several stations for clarity, with Melrose station becoming Melrose–Cedar Park. The station building was demolished by that time.

By a 2018 count, Melrose/Cedar Park ranked 128 of 139 stations in ridership, averaging 99 daily boardings. In November 2020, as part of service cuts during the pandemic, the MBTA proposed to close Melrose/Cedar Park plus five other low-ridership stations on other line. The station was nominated for closure because of its low ridership and lack of accessibility. On December 14, 2020, the MBTA Board voted to enact a more limited set of cuts, including indefinitely closing the other five stations. Melrose/Cedar Park was kept open because of its location in a dense, walkable area where many residents do not own cars.

Rail service on the inner Haverhill Line was suspended from September 9 to November 5, 2023, to accommodate signal work. Substitute bus service was operated between Reading and Oak Grove, serving all intermediate stops.

In 2024, the MBTA tested a temporary freestanding accessible platform design at Beverly Depot. These platforms do not require alterations to the existing platforms, thus skirting federal rules requiring full accessibility renovations when stations are modified, and were intended to provide interim accessibility at lower cost pending full reconstruction. In May 2024, the agency identified Melrose/Cedar Park as a possible future location for the platform design. As of May 2026, design work is underway; the accessible platforms at Cedar Park are expected to be completed in 2027.
