= Century Bank =

- Industry: Banking
- Founded: Century Bank, 1969
- Fate: Acquired by Eastern Bank
- Headquarters: Medford, Massachusetts, United States
- Key people: Marshall M. Sloane, Founder; Barry R. Sloane, Chairman, President & CEO; Linda Sloane Kay, Vice Chair
- Total assets: US$ 6.4 billion (2021)
- Number of employees: 740
- Website: CenturyBank.com

Century Bank was a bank based in Massachusetts. It was founded in Somerville, Massachusetts in 1969 by Marshall M. Sloane and at one point became the state's largest family-run bank. Century Bank had over $6 billion in assets with 27 offices in 19 cities and towns in Massachusetts. Marshall’s son, Barry Sloane, sat as Chairman, President & CEO while Marshall’s daughter, Linda Sloane Kay, was the Bank’s Vice Chair. Century Bank was a lender to local businesses, municipalities, not-for-profit organizations and families. Headquartered in Medford, MA, Century Bank employed more than four hundred staff.

== History ==
On May 1, 1969, Century Bank and Trust Company officially opened its doors in a temporary trailer parked on the M.D.C.'s sidewalk at 102 Fellsway West in Somerville. The Bank's beginning started in early 1968 with the idea of one man, Marshall M. Sloane, as there was a great need for a community-based commercial bank in Somerville. By November 21, 1968, he and 20 other businessmen were granted a charter to establish the Century Bank & Trust Company. On January 10, 1969 Century Bank was incorporated, becoming the first new bank in Somerville since the mid-1800s. Opening day in the trailer saw President Marshall M. Sloane and seven employees realize the fruits of their labor. Without any promotional efforts, the new bank took in $1.1 million in deposits for a profitable first day. In four weeks, deposits had grown to $4 million; in eight weeks they were over $7 million; and by December 31, 1969, the total assets had passed the $17 million mark. Century Bank had become the fastest growing bank in Massachusetts history in its first year of operation.

Century Bank was acknowledged annually in the Boston Globe 100 as one of the top performing publicly traded companies in Massachusetts.

On April 7, 2021, Eastern Bankshares announced that they are merging with Century Bank with Eastern as the remaining bank. The merger completed on November 12, 2021.
