= Wainwright Bank =

American bank

Wainwright Bank & Trust Company
- Type: Private company
- Industry: Finance
- Founded: July 28, 1987 in Boston, United States
- Founders: Robert Glassman and John Plukas
- Defunct: 2010
- Fate: Acquired
- Successor: Eastern Bank
- Headquarters: Boston, United States
- Key people: Jan A. Miller, last President
- Products: Banking
- Number of employees: 100 (2010)
- Website: www.wainwrightbank.com

Wainwright Bank was an American socially progressive bank based in Boston. The bank was founded in 1987 and was acquired by Eastern Bank in 2010. While it operated it was lauded as a "rebel with a cause making its reputation as a champion of social-justice causes, throwing its support behind everything from the gay-rights movement and affordable housing initiatives to immigration reform and the anti-Iraq war movement."

There were 12 branch offices in Boston, Cambridge, Brookline, Newton, Watertown and Somerville. Wainwright made community development, affordable housing, civil and human rights, and other social issues a prominent focus of its activities and had a documented history of leadership in supporting social justice efforts.

Wainwright was featured in three books on this topic: in 2005, Megatrends 2010: The Rise of Conscious Capitalism by Patrician Aburdene; in 2006, named as a “truly responsible and highly profitable firm that is changing business now” in The High Purpose Company by Christine Arena; and in 2008 in the Soul of a Leader by Margaret Benefiel PhD, CEO of Executive Soul and a teacher of spirituality and leadership at Andover Newton Theological School.

In June 2010 it was announced that Wainwright would be bought by the larger local regional Eastern Bank for $163 million. The purchase was completed by the end of 2010. Wainwright branches, staff and community involvement were absorbed by Eastern Bank and the Wainwright name was dropped.

== Mission and values ==
The bank had been a strong advocate for universal civil rights for gays and lesbians. It testified in 1996 before the US Congressional Committee on Small Business to endorse the Employment Non-discrimination Act (ENDA). It supported equality for women by endorsing the National Organization for Women’s Women Friendly Workplace Pledge in 1997. Wainwright has been credited as a leader in urging the Massachusetts Banker’s health insurance group to offer same-sex health benefits to all its member banks.

According to the Federal Deposit Insurance Corporation, the bank was a leader and an innovator in its community development lending efforts and had an outstanding record of helping to meet the credit needs of its assessment area, including low and moderate-income neighborhoods, receiving an "outstanding" rating for its 2008 Community Reinvestment Act Performance Evaluation.

The bulk of Wainwright Bank and Trust Co.'s commercial loan portfolio financed socially responsible community development projects.

Wainwright made substantial commitments to environmental sustainability in its infrastructure as well as its products. The last two of its 12 branches - Coolidge Corner and Newton received Silver and Gold certifications respectively under the LEED certification system that measures how well a building or community performed across all the metrics that matter most: energy savings, water efficiency, CO_{2} emissions reduction, improved indoor environmental quality, and stewardship of resources and sensitivity to their impacts. In 2008 Wainwright sited its 12th branch in the Dorchester, MA Transit-Oriented Development (TOD) building adjacent to the MBTA's Ashmont Red Line Station in Dorchester.

Wainwright Bank's Green Loan was first offered in 2001, and provides a discounted home equity loan rate for energy efficient home improvements including the installation of solar panels, passive heating systems, green roofs, wind energy and more.

Internally, the Bank had management practices that have been lauded nationally as among the most progressive. Diversity was reflected in the 22 languages spoken by employees; it was "one of the most diverse boards of any commercial bank in the country with women or minorities comprising close to 40% of the directors. Over 50% of officers were women, approximately 10% of employees were openly gay or lesbian, including two senior vice presidents, and minorities comprised over 33% of its employee base."

== History ==
The bank was founded on 28 July 1987 by John Plukas and Robert Glassman and opened public stock sales nine months later, on 13 October 1988.

In 1989, the bank inaugurated a Social Justice Award "to recognize nonprofits and affiliated individuals who have achieved outstanding success in addressing issues of social justice." Recipients of the award are given a grant of $10,000.

By 1989, the bank posted a profit of $1,300,000.

In 1994 Wainwright offered same-sex medical benefits to employees.

In 1997 Wainwright purchased a 30% interest in Trillium Assets Management Inc., the oldest and largest independent investment management firm in the U.S. exclusively devoted to socially responsible investing. That year Wainwright also publicly supported the NOW Women Friendly Workplace Pledge National Organization for Women. In 1997, the bank received the first of 10 awards to date from the US Treasury Community Development financial institutions fund – known as the Bank Enterprise Cash Award (BEA) followed by awards in 1998, 1999, 2000, 2002, 2003, 2005, 2006, 2008, and 2009. The Bank Enterprise Award Program was created in 1994 to support Federal Deposit Insurance Corporation (FDIC)-insured financial institutions around the country that are dedicated to financing and supporting community and economic development activities. In 1998, Business Ethics cited it in its annual awards "for dedication to social justice, internally and externally." In 2006, Business Ethics again cited Wainwright, ranking it 18th of "100 best corporate citizens", stating that it had provided more than $400 million in loans to development projects such as affordable housing and homeless shelters. In 2007, the same magazine ranked it 38th.

In 1998, Wainwright become a signatory to CERES, "a national network of investors, environmental organizations and other public interest groups working with companies and investors to address sustainability challenges such as global climate change."

In 1999, Wainwright's CommunityRoom.net was launched to provide free web pages to any nonprofit client of the bank and the ability to accept online donations.

In 2003, the Community Investing Campaign commended Wainwright for its "building of economic opportunity and hope for individuals through community investing" and for granting the Silent Spring Institute a line of credit for breast cancer research.

On November 15, 2004, KLD Research & Analytics, Inc., an independent investment research firm, announced that Wainwright Bank & Trust Company had been added to KLD's Domini 400 SocialSM Index (DS 400 Index).

2006 - Wainwright offered the Equal Exchange Certificate of Deposit the first "branded CD" in partnership with the Fair Trade coffee and chocolate cooperative company.

2008 – Wainwright received an “outstanding” rating for its 2008 Community Reinvestment Act Performance Evaluation On 18 November 2008, the bank announced that it had received a $25,000,000 allocation, jointly with Affirmative Investments of Boston, under the New Markets Tax Credits programme. The allocation was awarded, in the sixth round, to provide financing for projects in four "highly distressed" Boston neighbourhoods — Hyde Park, Mattapan, Dorchester and Roxbury.

In 2010, the bank was acquired for $163 million by Eastern Bank. Wainwright branches, staff and community involvement were absorbed by Eastern Bank, and the Wainwright name was dropped.
