= Melrose Highlands station =

Train station in Melrose, Massachusetts

Melrose Highlands
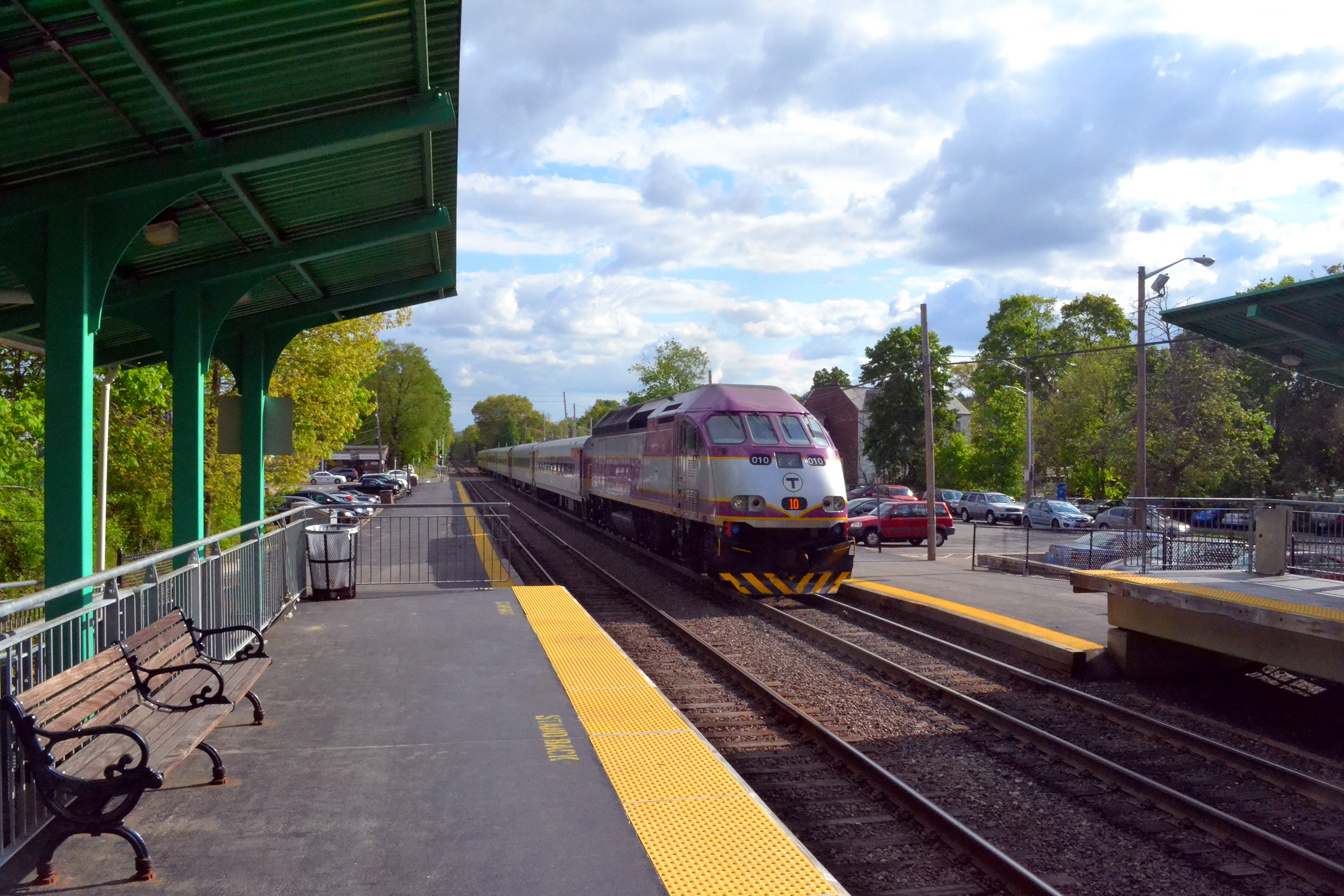
- An inbound train at Melrose Highlands in 2012

General information
- Location: 497 Franklin Street; Melrose, Massachusetts
- Coordinates: 42.46948°N 71.06830°W
- Owner: City of Melrose
- Line: Western Route
- Platforms: 2 side platforms
- Tracks: 2
- Connections: MBTA bus: 131

Construction
- Parking: 77 spaces ($2.00 fee)
- Accessible: Yes

Other information
- Fare zone: 1

History
- Opened: c. 1845
- Rebuilt: 1903
- Former names: Stoneham (until c. 1887)

Passengers
- 2024: 86 daily boardings

Services
Preceding station	MBTA	Following station
Melrose/Cedar Park toward North Station	Haverhill Line	Greenwood toward Haverhill
Location

Melrose Highlands station is an MBTA Commuter Rail station on the Haverhill Line located in the Melrose Highlands neighborhood of Melrose, Massachusetts. It is the most used station in the city, and was originally planned to be a station on the cancelled extension of the Orange Line to Reading. The station is accessible.

== History ==
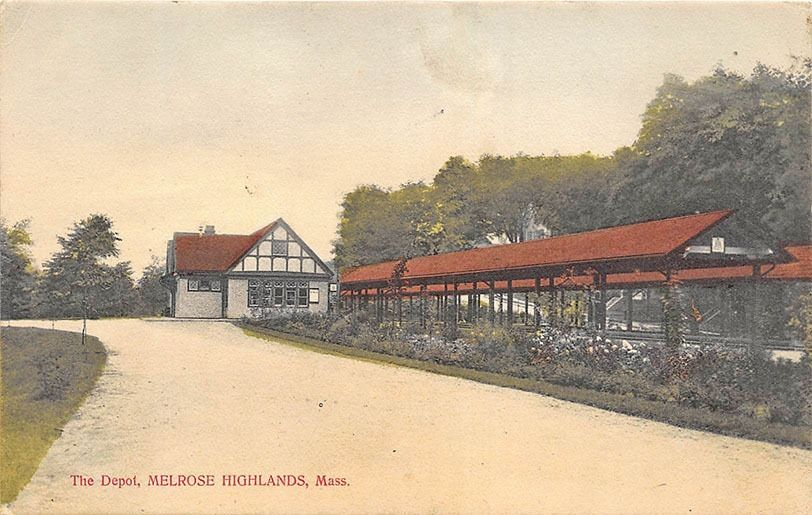
Melrose Highlands station around 1908

The Boston and Maine Railroad (B&M) opened its line from Wilmington Junction to Boston on July 1, 1845. Stoneham station opened on Franklin Street in the east part of Stoneham then or soon thereafter. In 1853, the east part of Stoneham was annexed into Melrose (itself split from Malden in 1850 due to development around the rail line) and soon renamed Melrose Highlands.

Unusually, the B&M did not rename the station – likely to compete with the rival Boston and Lowell Railroad (B&L) for Stoneham traffic. (The B&L had its Montvale station slightly closer to downtown Stoneham, and opened the Stoneham Branch directly to the town in 1862.) The B&M leased the entire B&L system in 1887, ending the competition. The station was soon renamed as Melrose Highlands, though the Stoneham name was still locally used for some time thereafter.

The original station was on the west side of the tracks just south of Franklin Street. In 1903, the B&M built a larger station just north of Franklin Street. The station was demolished in the 1950s or 1960s.

The MBTA, formed in 1964 to subsidize suburban commuter rail service, began funding Reading Line service on January 18, 1965. Mini-high platforms on the north end of each platform opened in January 2006, making the station accessible. Rail service on the inner Haverhill Line was suspended from September 9 to November 5, 2023, to accommodate signal work. Substitute bus service was operated between Reading and Oak Grove, serving all intermediate stops.
