= Mount Hood Golf Club =

Golf club in Melrose, Massachusetts

Coordinates: 42°27′00″N 71°02′09″W

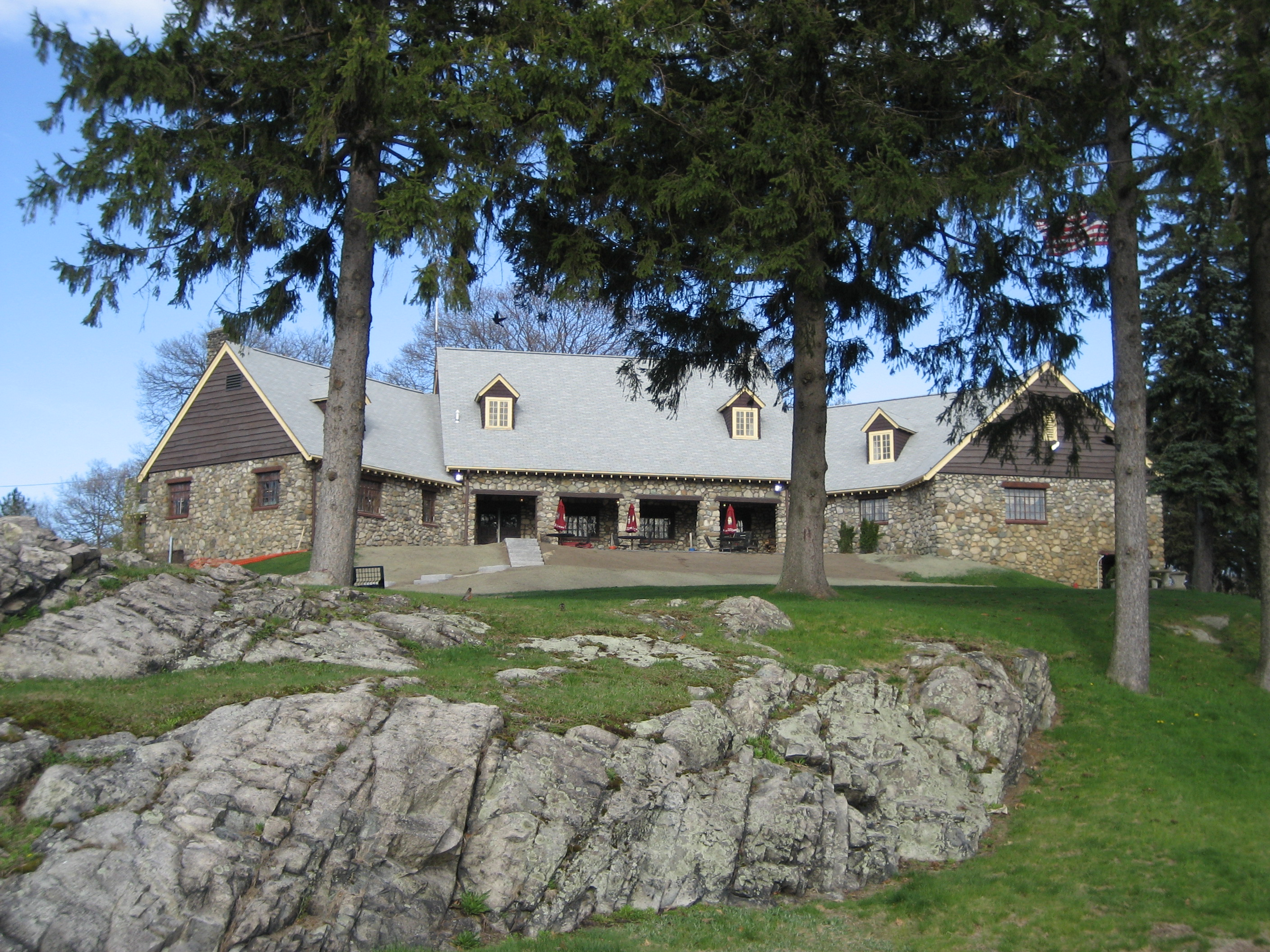
The Mount Hood Clubhouse (2008).

Mount Hood is an 18-hole golf club and park located in Melrose, Massachusetts. It was built in the 1930s on donated land as part of President Franklin D. Roosevelt's Works Progress Administration and once consisted of a ski area. Today, Mount Hood serves as a golf course and park, while sledding is popular in the winter.

== History ==
=== Beginnings ===
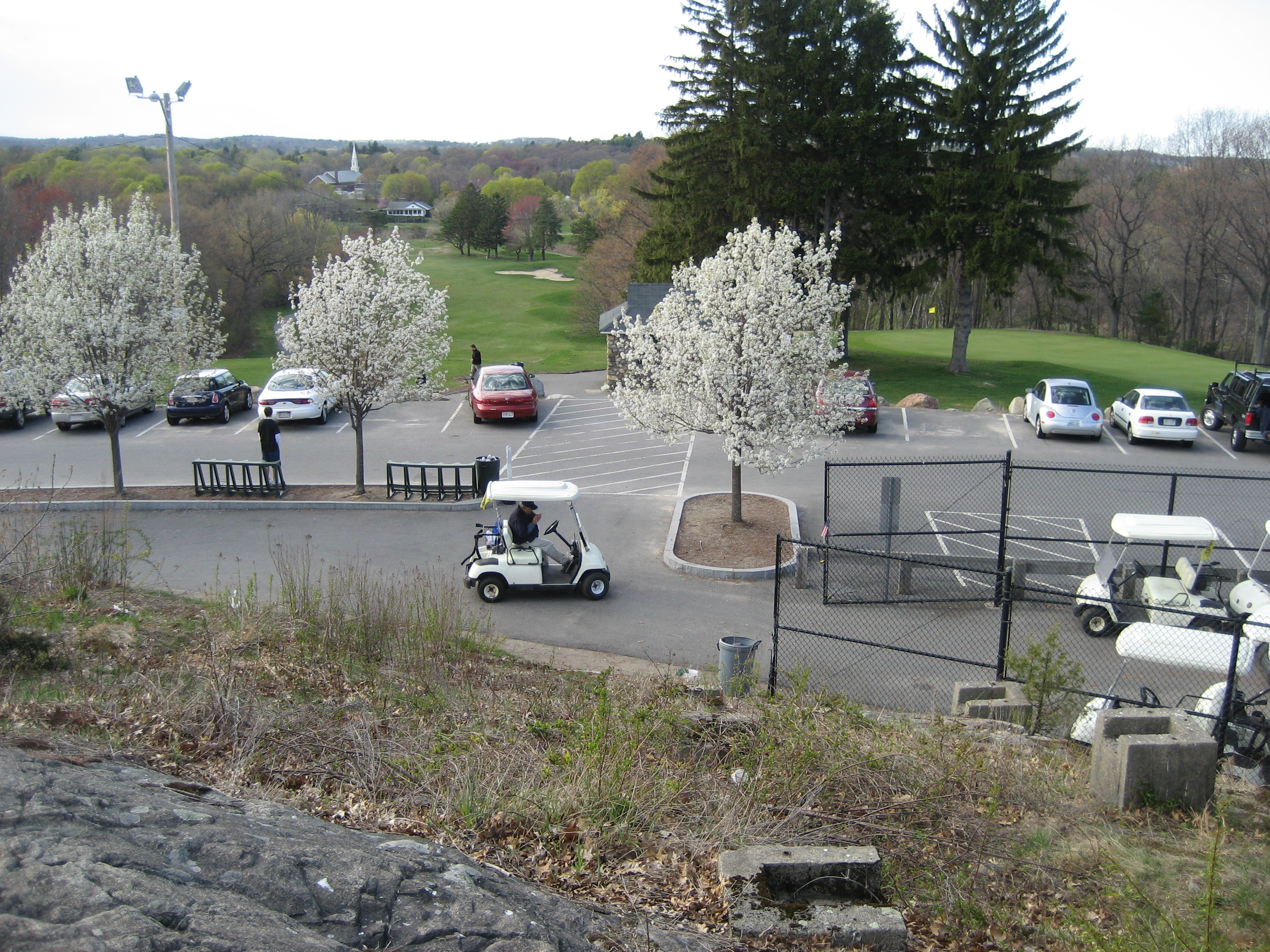
The footings of the old toboggan track are in the bottom right corner with the first hole fairway in the distance.

The land that comprises Mount Hood was donated to the City of Melrose and developed as part of President Franklin D. Roosevelt's Works Progress Administration in the early 1930s. The original complex consisted of a nine-hole golf course, a clubhouse, Slayton Tower, a wooden toboggan track that ran from the clubhouse, over Stillman Road and down the first hole fairway, and a ski jump, credited as being the first of its kind in New England. Also built were two cabins: one for the Girl Scouts of the USA and one for the Boy Scouts of America.

Slayton Tower was built to house a small Army outpost assigned to look out over the Atlantic Ocean for German U-boats during World War II. From the top, one can see the entire Revere Beach area and also part of Lynn Beach.

When winter arrived, the park was used for various activities including skiing, sledding, and skating. In addition to the toboggan run and ski jump, there was also a rope tow to bring skiers and sledders from the bottom of the slope—officially named the Arthur L. Delaney Ski Slope—to the top. Skating on the first pond was also popular and the area was lit, allowing activities to continue into the night.

=== Current conditions ===
Since the closing of the ski area, estimated to be around 1971, Mount Hood has functioned as both a park and a golf course. Its various hiking and biking trails offer a way to get away from the busy city life and the park also contains a tot lot for children. There are also several ponds where ice skating and fishing are allowed. Though the ski resort no longer exists, sledding is popular in the winter.

The size of Mount Hood golf course was increased from nine to eighteen holes and today it offers challenge and variety unique in the Boston area. In the midst of a wooded 300-acre (1.2 km^{2}) park, 10 miles (16 km) from the Zakim Bridge it boasts views of nearby Boston, Revere Beach and the wilderness. Notable of the course is that eight of the eighteen tees are elevated allowing high tee shots as well as views from Boston to New Hampshire.

== See also ==
- Melrose, Massachusetts
- Golf Course
