= Downtown Melrose =

- Neighborhood
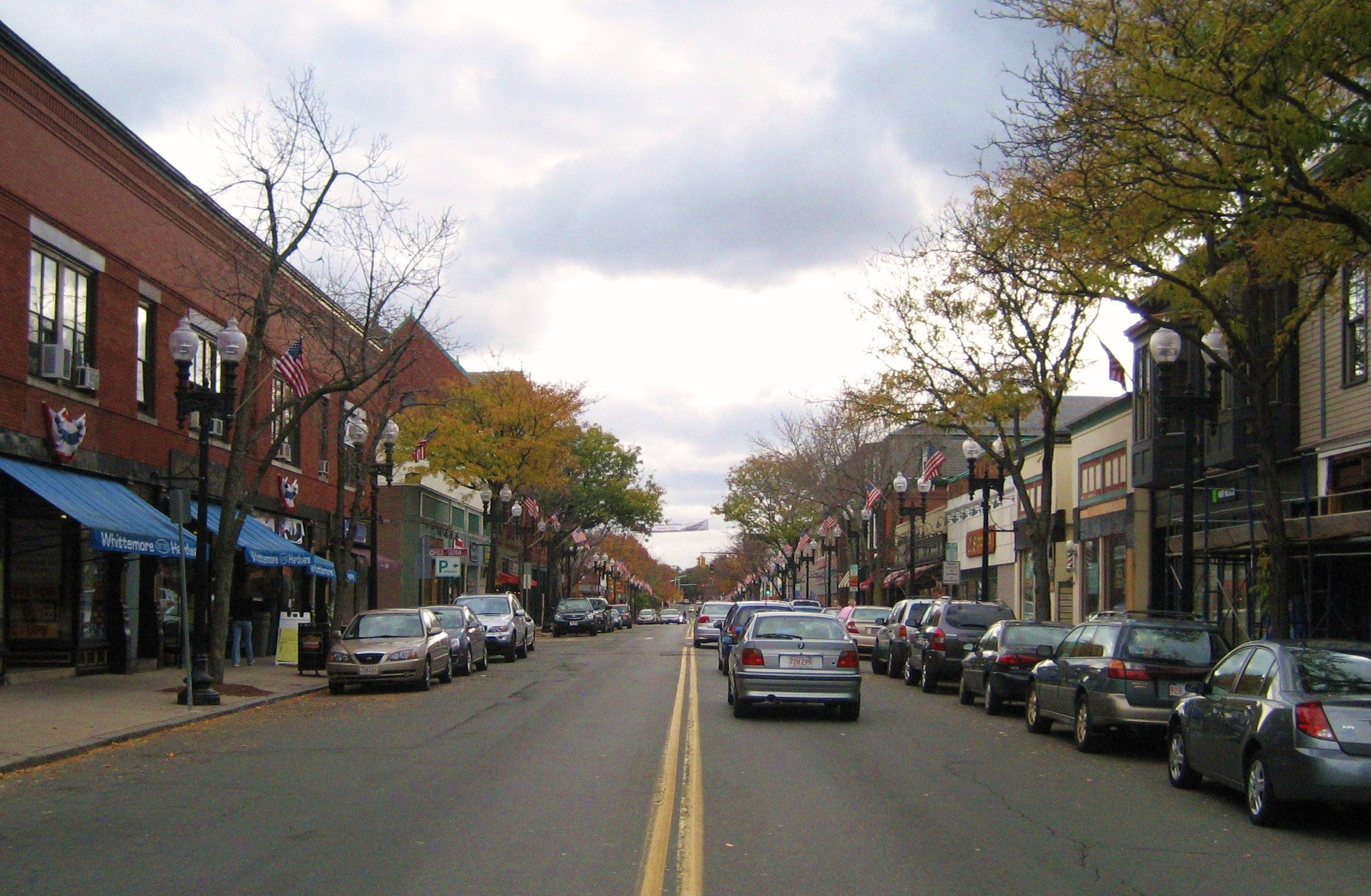
- Downtown Melrose seen from the intersection of Upham and Main Streets facing south
- Interactive map of Downtown Melrose
- Coordinates: 42°27′17″N 71°03′56″W
- Country: United States
- State: Massachusetts
- County: Middlesex
- City: Melrose
- Time zone: UTC-5 (Eastern)
  - Summer (DST): UTC-4 (Eastern)
- ZIP code: 02176
- Area code: 339 / 781
- Website: www.cityofmelrose.org
- Melrose Town Center Historic District
- U.S. National Register of Historic Places
- U.S. Historic district
- Location within Massachusetts
- Location: Main St., Melrose, Massachusetts
- Area: 8 acres (3.2 ha)
- Architect: Multiple
- Architectural style: Late 19th And 20th Century Revivals, Late Victorian
- NRHP reference No.: 82002744
- Added to NRHP: April 1, 1982

Downtown Melrose is the central business district of Melrose, Massachusetts. It is known for its nineteenth century Victorian architecture and its many small family-owned stores. Downtown Melrose is generally classified as the area on Main Street from Grove Street to Essex/Upham Streets. Part of the area, running on Main Street just northeast of the junction with Upham and Essex Streets, is included in the Melrose Town Center Historic District, which was added to the National Register of Historic Places on April 1, 1982. This district encompasses seven buildings, including city hall, the main fire station, Memorial Hall, the Coolidge School, and the Baptist and Methodist churches.

== See also ==
- National Register of Historic Places listings in Middlesex County, Massachusetts
