= Eastern Bank =

Bank in Massachusetts, United States

Eastern Bancshares, Inc.
- Type: Public
- Traded as: Nasdaq: EBC
- Industry: Banking
- Headquarters: Boston, Massachusetts, U.S.
- Key people: Robert F. Rivers (chairman and CEO)
- Net income: ▲US$154.7 million (2021)
- Total assets: ▲US$23.5 billion (2021)
- Website: www.easternbank.com

Eastern Bank is a bank based in Boston, Massachusetts. Before de-mutualizing in 2020, it was the oldest and largest mutual bank in the United States and the largest community bank in Massachusetts.

With 95 branches, Eastern had a 3.2% market share in Massachusetts in 2016. It was founded in 1818 in Salem, and then moved to Lynn, Massachusetts.

The company began an aggressive expansion campaign near the end of the 1990s and moved its headquarters to Boston's Financial District. In 2020, Eastern Bank announced plans to de-mutualize and become a publicly traded corporation.

== History ==
Eastern Bank was established on April 15, 1818, by a Canadian dentist, as Salem Savings Bank and became insured by the Federal Deposit Insurance Corporation on October 1, 1983. On October 19, 1989, Eastern Savings Bank's parent company Lynn, Massachusetts-based Eastern Bank Corporation, renamed it Eastern Bank, and reorganized it into a mutual holding company, making it the first of its kind in Massachusetts.

In the years following its reorganization, it made several acquisitions of local banks. They included Shore Bank And Trust Company (Lynn, April 1992), Malden Trust Company (Malden, May 1992), First Colonial Bank For Savings (Lynn, October 1993), and Saugus Bank And Trust Company (Saugus, November 1994).

In 1997, Eastern began an aggressive expansion program with the aim of doubling its size within five years. The first acquisition of the program was initiated in early 1998 when Eastern bought the ten-branch Quincy-based Hibernia Savings Bank and its parent holding company Emerald Isle Bancorp, Inc for $80 million and converted all branches to Eastern Banks. Eastern, with the bulk of its branches north of Boston, gained exposure to the market south of Boston through the acquisition.

In November 2002, Eastern Bank merged its operations with its subsidiary, Salem-based Eastern Bank & Trust Company. The following year in March 2003, company headquarters were moved from Lynn to Boston's Financial District, positioning it alongside the regional headquarters of other large banks including FleetBoston Financial and Citizens Bank.

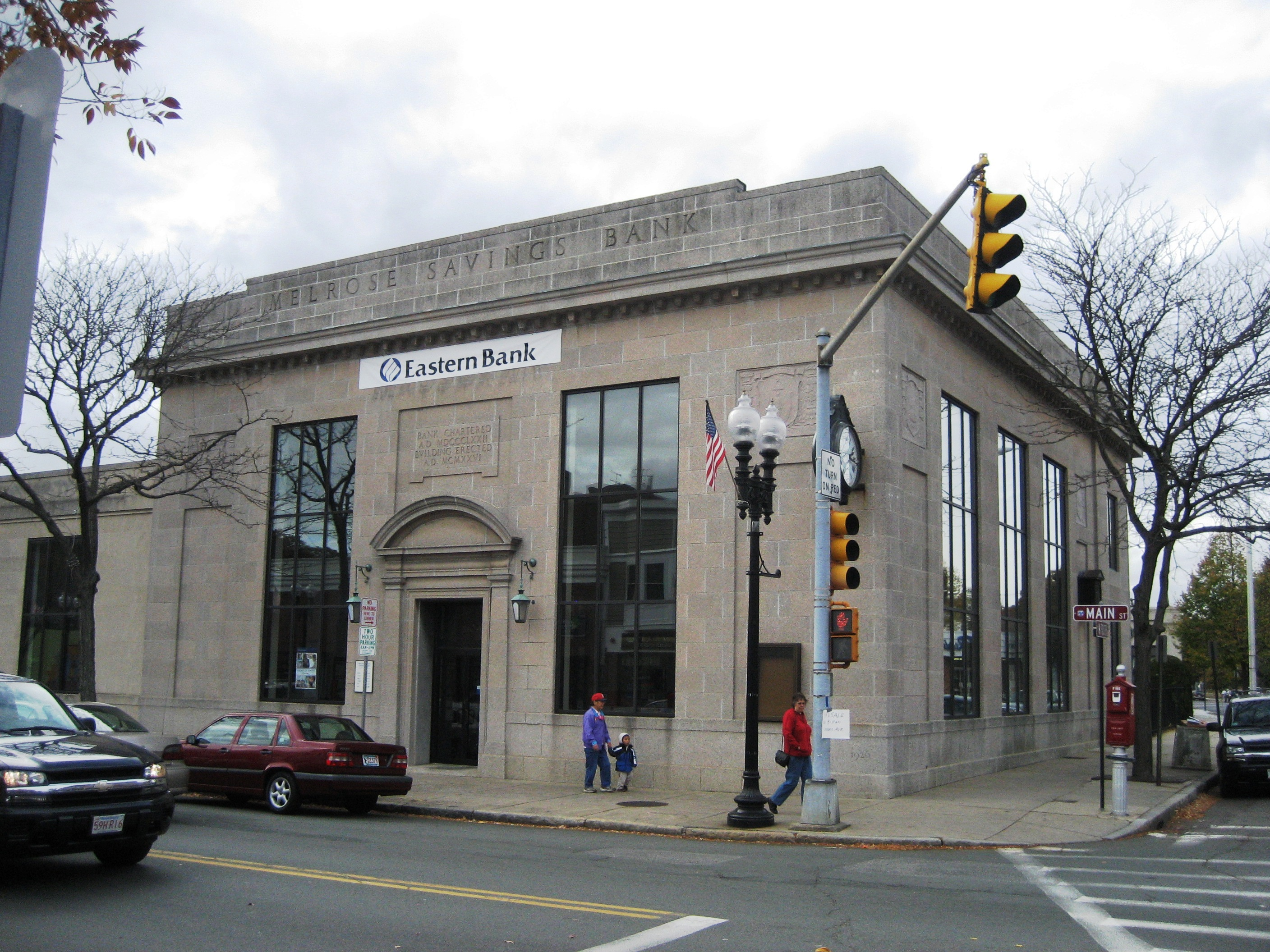
Former MassBank location in Downtown Melrose. Divested after temporary rebranding.

Continually expanding its footprint in the region, Eastern purchased Wareham's Plymouth Savings Bank in May 2005 and Sharon Co-operative Bank in May 2007. Eastern Bank announced in March 2008 its intention to buy Reading-based MassBank Corp. for $170 million. Eastern's third acquisition in four years, it doubled its deposits in Middlesex County to more than $1.4 billion, garnering a 4% market share in the county. In late June 2010, it was announced that Eastern Bank was the winning bidder to acquire independent Massachusetts bank Wainwright and its 12 branches located in Boston and the surrounding communities. The bank, "known for its social activism and lending to nonprofit organizations", was purchased for $163 million or $19 a share; almost double its $9.62 closing stock price prior to the announcement. The merger was completed in November 2010, and the 12 branches were converted to Eastern Bank branches in March 2011, and over 100 new employees joined Eastern Bank.

In July 2012, Eastern announced a merger with The Community Bank, a $300 million cooperative mutual bank headquartered in Brockton, with five branches in southeastern Massachusetts. The mutual merger of the two banks, including the conversion to Eastern, was concluded on November 30, 2012, and marked the fifth mutual-mutual merger for Eastern.

In March 2014, Eastern signed a definitive agreement to acquire Bedford, N.H.-based Centrix Bank & Trust. The acquisition was completed on Friday, Oct. 24, 2015, and the two banks were merged over the weekend. The merger added six new branch locations in southern and coastal New Hampshire, marking the first retail locations for Eastern in the Granite State.

In June 2020, Eastern Bank announced that it would be de-mutualizing to become a publicly traded bank. The bank's IPO occurred in October 2020. The IPO raised $1.8 billion at a market capitalization of $19 billion.

On April 7, 2021, Eastern Bank announced that it agreed to merge with Medford, Massachusetts-based Century Bank, with Eastern Bank continuing as the surviving institution. The deal was announced with a valuation of $642 million.

In September 2023, it was announced Eastern Bank had agreed the sale of its Natick-based subsidiary, Eastern Insurance Group, to the insurance and risk management company, Arthur J. Gallagher & Co.

On July 15, 2024, Cambridge Bancorp merged its operations with Eastern Bankshares, Inc., the holding company of Eastern Bank.

== Philanthropy ==
Eastern Bank Charitable Foundation, the charitable arm of Eastern Bank, announced that it will donate over $10 million in funding to help offset the impact of COVID-19.
