= Melrose Public Schools =

American school district in Massachusetts

Location
- Melrose, Massachusetts Greater Boston

District information
- Type: Public School district
- Grades: PK–12
- Superintendent: Adam Deleidi
- Budget: $38,619,040 (FY22)

Students and staff
- Students: 3,730 (FY26)

Other information
- Website: www.melroseschools.com

Melrose Public Schools is the school district for Melrose, Massachusetts. The district controls several schools in the city and is led by superintendent Adam Deleidi. Its offices are located at 360 Lynn Fells Parkway in Melrose.

== History ==
Public schooling in the area that is currently Melrose was initially under the control of the City of Malden. In 1850, the north end of Malden broke off and became the Town of Melrose, eventually becoming the City of Melrose in 1900. At the time of its separation, Melrose contained several small schoolhouses dispersed around the town. These schoolhouses formed the beginnings of Melrose Public Schools. On May 4, 2026, a 9-year-old boy died after a tree fell on him in the playground of John Winthrop Elementary School.

== School Committee ==
The current members of the Melrose school committee are Margaret Raymond Driscoll (chair), Dorie Withey (Vice Chair), Jen Grigoraitis (Mayor), Matt Hartman, Seamus Kelley, Jen McAndrew, and Jennifer Razi-Thomas. School committee meetings are televised on local public-access television station MMTV and recordings are available on the MMTV website.

District Attendance
Year	Pop.	±%
1925	3,221	—
1980	5,514	+71.2%
1985	4,351	−21.1%
1990	3,822	−12.2%
1995	3,497	−8.5%
2000	3,497	+0.0%
2005	3,593	+2.7%
2010	3,767	+4.8%
2015	3,725	−1.1%
2025	3,730	+0.1%
Sources:, - Melrose Public Schools

== Current schools ==
Name	Type	Enrollment (FY26)	Address	Year opened	Notes
Franklin	Early Childhood Center	247	16 Franklin Street	1897	Rebuilt in 1966. Former elementary school.
Herbert Clark Hoover	Elementary	266	37 Glendower Road	1966	Modular classrooms added in 2017.
Horace Mann	Elementary	258	40 Damon Avenue	1949	Addition in 1956. Renovated in 2017.
Abraham Lincoln	Elementary	387	80 West Wyoming Avenue	1896	Renovated and expanded in 2000
Theodore Roosevelt	Elementary	366	253 Vinton Street	1924	Rebuilt in 2002
John Winthrop	Elementary	372	162 First Street	1926	Addition in 1956. Modular classrooms added in 2017.
Melrose Veterans Memorial Middle School	Middle	830	350 Lynn Fells Parkway	1933	Built as Melrose High School. Middle school since 1975. Rebuilt 2007.
Melrose High School	High	1,004	360 Lynn Fells Parkway	1975	

== Former schools ==
Name	Address	Year opened	Year closed	Fate	Notes	Ref
Calvin Coolidge	585 Main Street	1898	1981	Coolidge Apartments	Built as Melrose High School. Addition in 1909. Converted to elementary school in 1932.	
Converse	Washington Street	1885	—			
Decius Beebe	263 West Foster Street	1956	2004	Leased to SEEM Collaborative	Addition in 1963	
Mary A. Livermore	Between Lebanon Street/Main Street	1891	1933	Municipal parking lot		
D. W. Gooch	Corner Florence Street/Maple Street	1886	—	Gooch Park	Renovated and expanded in 1892	
Ripley	94 Lebanon Street	1891	2001	Leased to SEEM Collaborative	Original Ripley School located at 29 Swains Pond Avenue. Built at current location in 1924. Additions in 1930 and 1965.	
Joseph Warren	Corner Melrose Street/Warren Street	1892	—	Volunteer Park (Warren Street Park)		
Washington	408 Lebanon Street	1896	—	Condominiums		
Whittier	Corner Franklin Street/Sargent Street	1884	—	Dunton Park	Originally Franklin School	
Melrose High School	69 West Emerson St	1869	1897	Destroyed by fire in 1897	Current site of Melrose Public Library	
