= Wright Memorial Library =

- U.S. National Register of Historic Places
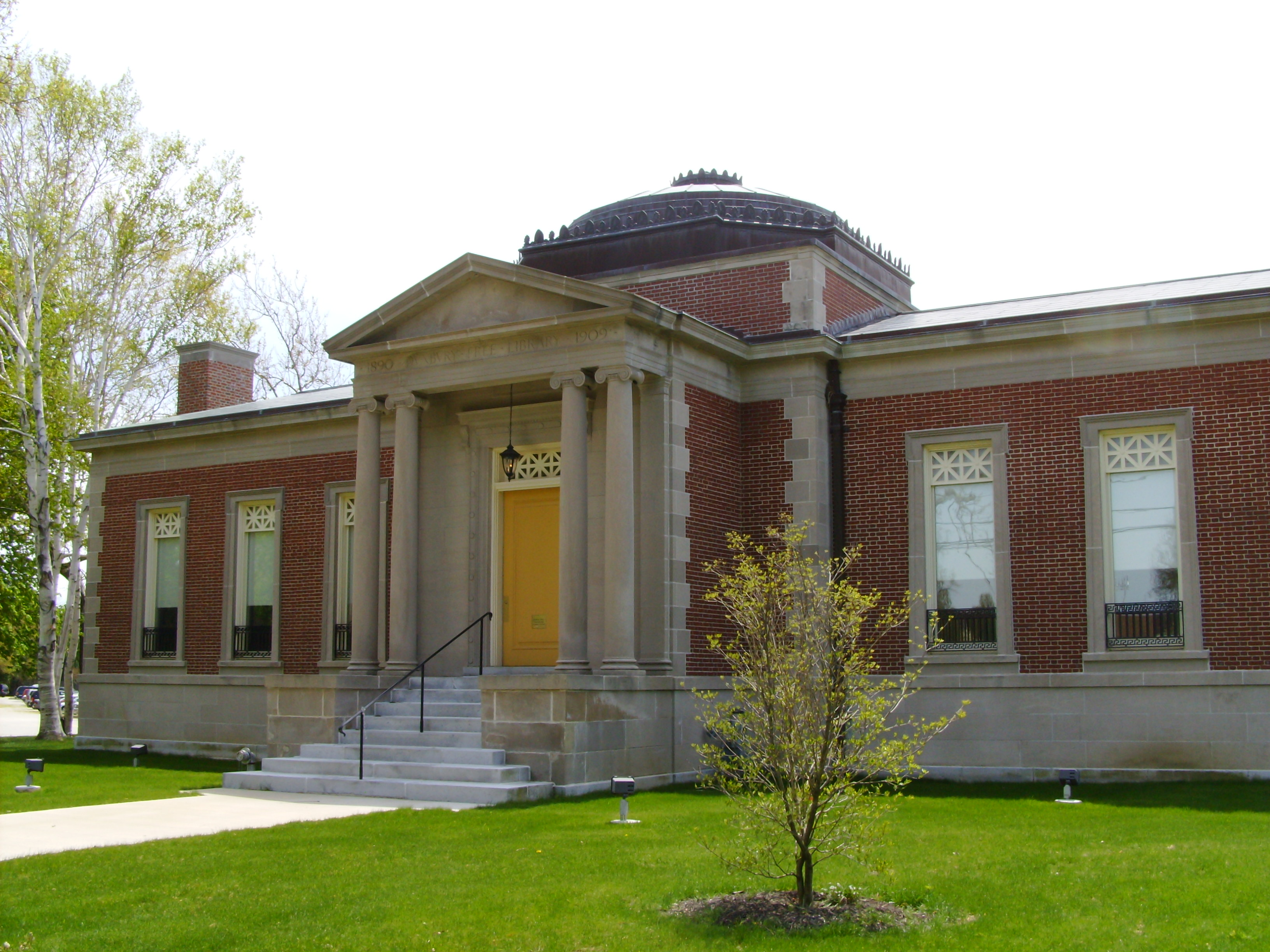

- Location within Massachusetts Location within the United States
- Location: Duxbury, Massachusetts
- Coordinates: 42°2′55″N 70°40′48″W
- Built: 1909
- Architect: Joseph Everett Chandler; John Osborne Chesley, Jr.
- Architectural style: Colonial revival and Modern
- NRHP reference No.: 07000680
- Added to NRHP: July 11, 2007

Wright Memorial Library, more commonly known as the "Wright Building," is a historic library at 147 St. George Street in Duxbury, Massachusetts.

== Historic significance ==
The Wright Building was donated to the Town of Duxbury by Georgianna Wright (1837–1919), an influential citizen of Duxbury and philanthropist. In 1890, Wright had donated her guest house to serve as the first Duxbury Free Library. The wooden building soon grew too cramped and by 1906, Wright decided to fund the construction of a new building. Sparing no expense, she hired a well-known architect, Joseph Everett Chandler, to design a brick library in the colonial revival style. Other projects by Chandler include the Frederic Adams Library in Kingston, Massachusetts and the restoration of the Paul Revere House in Boston, Massachusetts. The cornerstone was laid in 1907 and the building completed in 1909. A newspaper reporter present at the dedication noted some of the library's impressive features, including electric lighting and a reading room paneled in black cypress with gilded accents.

== Restoration ==
In 1997, the Duxbury Free Library moved to new quarters, leaving the Wright Building empty. Used sporadically by various organizations for a few years, by 2004 the Wright Building was vacant and suffering decay. By a vote of Duxbury Town Meeting, Community Preservation Funds were appropriated and the Town of Duxbury undertook the extensive restoration of the building. The 1909 portion of the library was outfitted for use by the Duxbury Rural and Historical Society for their Drew Archival Library where historic documents are preserved. The 1968 addition was refurbished for use by the Duxbury Student Union Association. The Wright Building was re-dedicated on September 22, 2007, just slightly over one hundred years after the cornerstone was laid. It was listed on the National Register of Historic Places in July 2007.

== See also ==
- National Register of Historic Places listings in Plymouth County, Massachusetts
