= George Francis Dow =

American historian and politician (1868–1936)

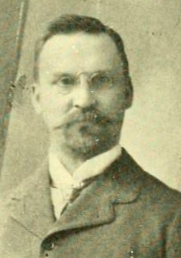
George Francis Dow

George Francis Dow (January 7, 1868 – June 5, 1936) was an American antiquarian for the Society for the Preservation of New England Antiquities, active in Massachusetts.

George Francis Dow was born on January 7, 1868, in Wakefield, New Hampshire. He joined the American Antiquarian Society in 1910. The Parson Capen House (Topsfield, Massachusetts) was restored under his direction in 1913. Dow was instrumental in the creation of the Pioneer Village for the 300th anniversary of the founding of Salem, Massachusetts. Joseph Everett Chandler, an architect, and George Francis Dow conceived Pioneer Village as a means to demonstrate life in 1630. They "engaged other experts and architects to help pull it off" before the Tercentenary celebrations. Noted landscape architect Harlan Page Kelsey drew up the plan. Philip Horton Smith planned the restoration of the Ruck House. They created one of America's first living history museums which the city of Salem committed to preserve in perpetuity.

The John Ward House was moved to its present site in 1910 and restored by the Peabody Essex Museum, under the direction of curator and early preservationist George Francis Dow. The house was moved my splitting it into two and rolled on ox-drawn logs from its original site three blocks away. In 1911, The John Ward House opened to the public, becoming the first outdoor museum of architecture in the country. The John Ward House is a National Historic Landmark at 132 Essex Street in Salem, Massachusetts. The house was built in 1684 by John Ward and added to the National Register of Historic Places in 1968.

He was a Republican member of the Massachusetts House of Representatives, representing the 10th Essex district, in the 1900 Massachusetts legislature.

Dow died on June 5, 1936, in Topsfield, Massachusetts.

== Selected works ==
- Records and Files of the Quarterly Courts of Essex County, ed. George Francis Dow, 1911-1975.
- The Pirates of the New England Coast 1630-1730, 1923 (Co-authored with John Henry Edmonds).
- Domestic life in New England in the seventeenth century; a discourse, 1925.
- Whale ships and whaling; a pictorial history of whaling during three centuries, with an account of the whale fishery in colonial New England, 1925.
- Arts & Crafts in New England, 1704-1775, 1927.
- Slave Ships and Slaving, 1927.
- Every Day Life in the Massachusetts Bay Colony, 1935.
- History of Topsfield, Massachusetts, 1940.
