= Topsfield Town Common District =

Historic district in Massachusetts, United States

- U.S. National Register of Historic Places
- U.S. Historic district
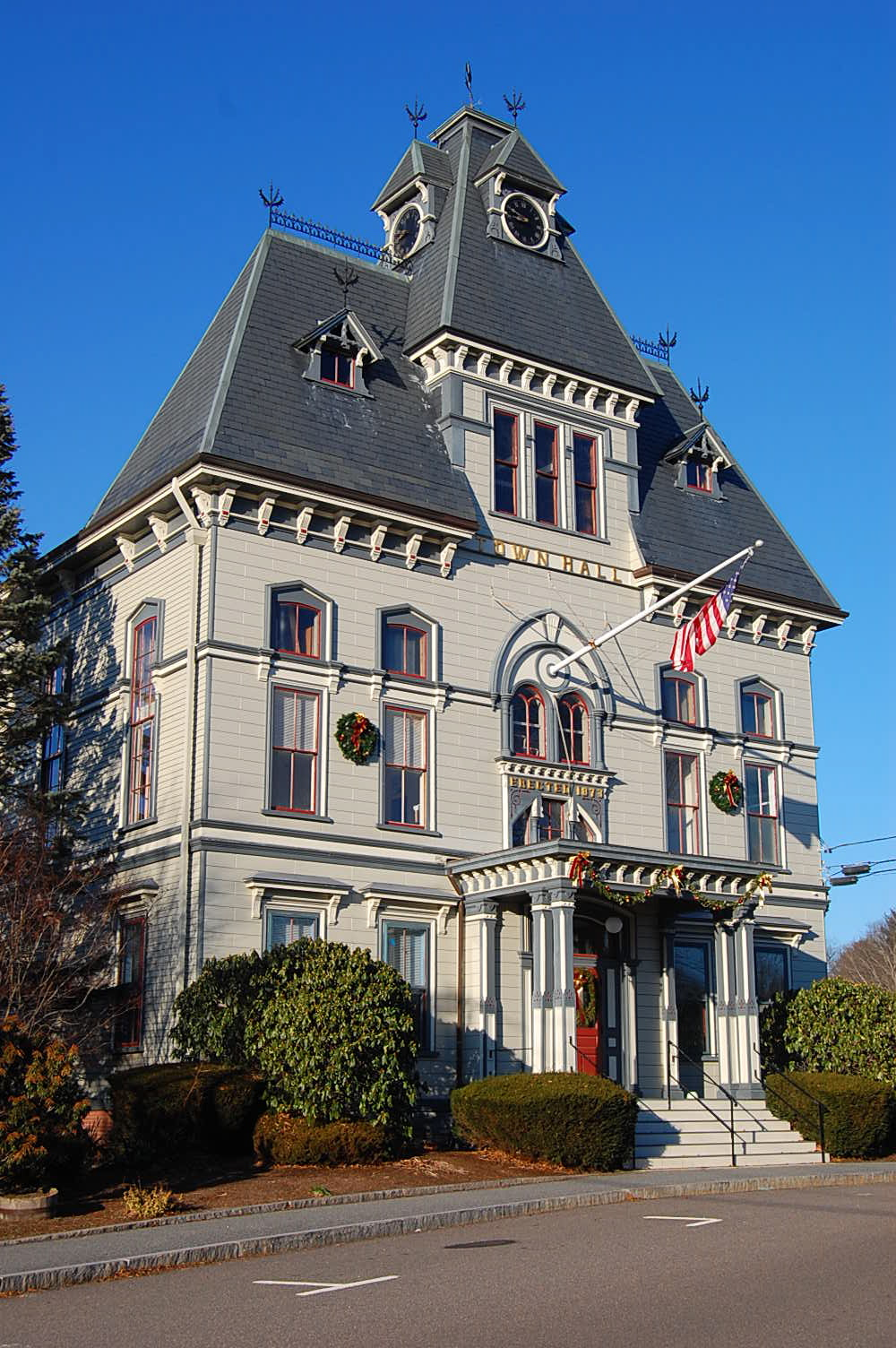
- Topsfield Town Hall

- Location within Massachusetts Location within the United States
- Location: Topsfield, Massachusetts
- Coordinates: 42°38′32″N 70°57′4″W
- Area: 13.1 acres (5.3 ha)
- Built: 1683
- NRHP reference No.: 03001488
- Added to NRHP: June 7, 1976

The Topsfield Town Common District encompasses the historic town common and surrounding buildings in Topsfield, Massachusetts. The common, established by 1650, is the traditional civic and religious center of the town, and is surrounded by houses dating from the 17th to 20th centuries, the town hall, library, and Congregational church. It was added to the National Register of Historic Places in 1976.

== Description and history ==
Colonial settlement of the area that is now Topsfield began in the 1630s, as colonists moved up the Ipswich River. By 1650, the year of the town's incorporation, a training ground for the local militia had been established. The town's first meeting house was built in 1703, where the present Greek Revival First Congregational Church (built 1842) now stands. Standing northeast of the common is the district's oldest building, the Parson Capen House; a National Historic Landmark built in 1683, it is one of the best-preserved houses of the period in the United States, and is now a historic house museum.

The common is now an irregularly shaped collection of triangular greens, divided by and bounded by the five roadways radiating in all directions. The northern side of the common, bounded by Washington Street and North Common, is lined by houses dating mainly from the early 19th century. The congregational church occupies a triangular section at the western side of the common, while the town hall (Chateau style, 1873) and public library (Classical Revival, 1935) dominate the southwest and southern edges. Facing the eastern side of the common is a large Federal mansion, built 1815 for a member of the locally prominent Emerson family; it is now part of a local preschool.

== See also ==
- List of the oldest buildings in Massachusetts
- National Register of Historic Places listings in Essex County, Massachusetts
