= Asael Smith =

American soldier and Mormon (1743–1830)

Captain Asael Smith
- Asael Smith's military records from March 4, 1776.
- Born: March 7, 1743; Topsfield, Essex County, Massachusetts
- Died: October 30, 1830 (aged 87); Buckton, St. Lawrence County, New York
- Burial place: Union Cemetery, New York
- Other name: Crook-neck Smith
- Occupations: soldier, farmer, town clerk of Manchester, New Hampshire
- Known for: Grandfather of Joseph Smith Jr.

Asael Smith (7 March 1743 – 30 October 1830) was a veteran of the American Revolutionary War and grandfather of Joseph Smith Jr., the founder of The Church of Jesus Christ of Latter-day Saints.

== Early life ==
Asael Smith's military records from March 4, 1776.

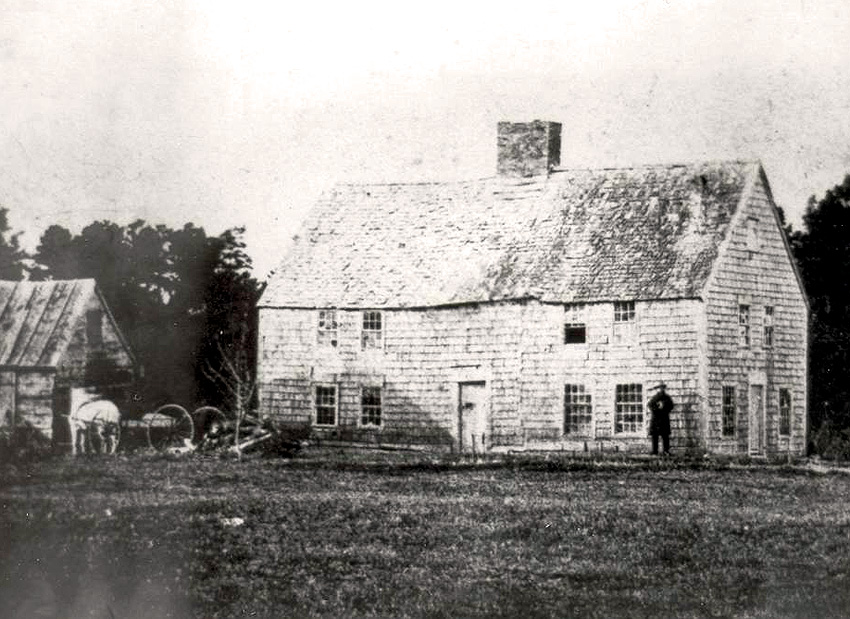
Asael Smith's family home, built in 1638 and later rebuilt in 1875.

Asael was born to Captain Samuel Smith Jr. (1714–1785) and Priscilla Gould (1707–1744). Samuel was an anti-British politician, militiamen for Massachusetts and member of the first Massachusetts Provincial Congress, and Priscilla was the descendant of Zaccheus Gould, one of the founders of Topsfield, Massachusetts. Asael's mother died 6 months after his birth and Samuel later married Priscilla Gould (the original Priscilla Gould's cousin). While growing up, he received a severe burn on his neck which caused a deformation leading to him gaining the nickname "Crook-neck Smith". Asael married Mary Duty (1743–1836) on February 12, 1767, the couple then moved to Windham, New Hampshire in 1772. From there they moved to Dunbarton and later Derryfield, now the city of Manchester.

== Military life and Vermont ==
Asael enlisted in the Continental Army and served under Colonel Joshua Wingate from March 4, 1776 to August 1, 1778. Asael returned to Topsfield in 1785 following the death of his father, and he worked in Topsfield for five years to liquidate his father's debts. After paying off the debts, he first moved to Ipswich, Massachusetts, and then to Tunbridge, Vermont in 1791. In 1797 he began to oppose the established religions and served as moderator of a meeting that established one of the early Universalist societies in Vermont. He also began to believe that God was going to "raise up some branch of his family to be a great benefit to mankind.”

== Death and legacy ==
A page from the personal bible of Hyrum Smith

Asael spent the rest of his life working as a farmer and living with his son Silas Smith in Stockholm, New York before his death on October 30, 1830. Before Asael's death his son Joseph Smith Sr. converted him to Mormonism despite the protest of Silas. Asael was praised by several prominent Mormons like Joseph Smith Jr., Joseph Fielding Smith, Brigham Young, and George Q. Cannon for his patriotism, honesty and his beliefs on religion and equal rights. According to Joseph Smith Jr., “My grandfather, said that he always knew that God was going to raise up some branch of his family to be a great benefit to mankind...he declared that I [Joseph] was the very Prophet that he had long known would come in his family.”
