= William Coolidge =

William Coolidge may refer to:

- William D. Coolidge (1873–1975), American physicist
- W. A. B. Coolidge (William Augustus Brevoort Coolidge, 1850–1926), American historian, theologist, and mountaineer
- William Appleton Coolidge (1901–1992), American lawyer, venture capitalist and art collector
