= Samuel Smith Jr. (military captain) =

Massachusetts politician and militiaman

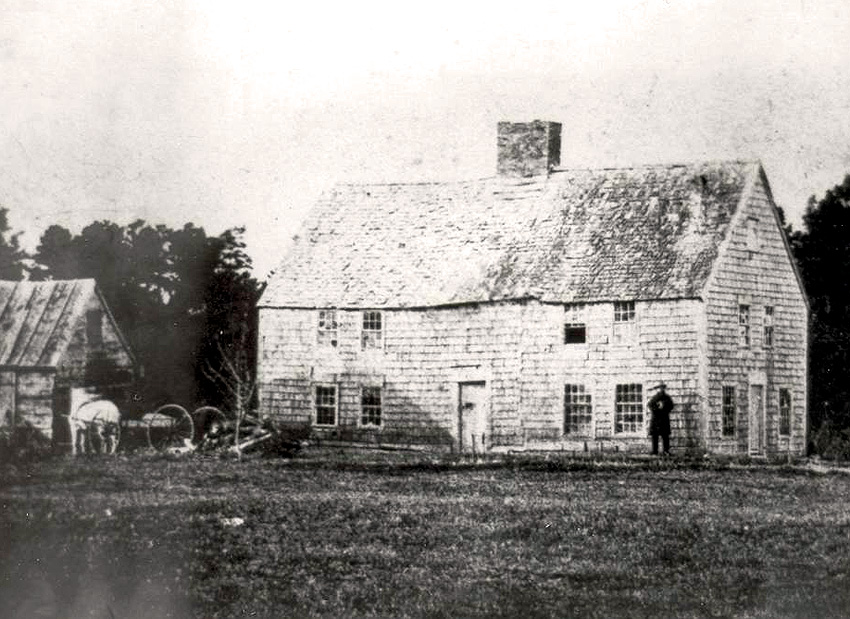
- Samuel Smith's house built in 1638 and rebuilt in 1875
- Born: January 26, 1714; Topsfield, Massachusetts Bay Colony
- Died: November 14, 1785 (aged 71); Topsfield, Massachusetts, United States
- Occupations: Politician and militiaman
- Years active: 1758–1780
- Title: Captain
- Children: 6, including Asael Smith

Samuel Smith Jr. (January 26, 1714 – November 14, 1785) was a Christian anti-British politician from Topsfield, Massachusetts and the paternal great-grandfather of Joseph Smith, the founder of Mormonism.

== Early life ==
Samuel Smith was the third child of Samuel Smith Sr. and Rebecca Curtis. He was described in the town being a "gentleman" in the Topsfield census, On May 27, 1734, Samuel married Priscilla Gould. The couple had six children together: Priscilla Smith (1735–1792), Samuel Smith III (1737–1792), Vashti Smith (1739–1807), Susanna Smith (1741-1741), Susanna Smith (1742–1811), and Asael Smith (1743–1830). On September 25, 1744, Priscilla died of unknown reasons and Samuel married her first cousin also named Priscilla Gould; Priscilla had no children with Samuel but helped raise his children.

== Military and politics ==
=== Roles ===
- During his visit to Ipswich in 1744, he became a congressman for the Massachusetts Provincial Congress.
- Samuel enlisted in a Massachusetts militia and achieved the rank of Lieutenant from 1758 to 1766.
- Served as a moderator from 1758 to 1783.
- From 1760 to 1785: he became a grand juryman.
- Served as a representative to the General Court from 1763 to 1781.
- In 1766 he achieved the rank of Captain and led an entire military company.
- Left the military in the 1770s.
- Supervisor of roads in 1770.
- Served as an Assessor and selectman from 1771 to 1777.
- Became Chairman of the Tea Committee in 1773 which would eventually led to the Boston Tea Party on December 16, 1773.
- In October 1774, Samuel Smith was chosen to represent the town of Topsfield for a meeting in Ipswich over the Intolerable Acts imposed by the British Empire following the Boston Tea Party.
- "Recog. of Debts" from 1777 to 1783.
- Served on the Committee of Public Safety from 1779 to 1785.
- From 1781 to 1782, served as a town clerk.

== Later years and death ==
Samuel's physical and mental health declined rapidly once he left politics which only became worse because of his debts. Due to his heavy involvement in public affairs, he accumulated a large amount debt which he lived with until his death. On November 14, 1785, Samuel died due to a stroke.
