= Fiesta Shows =

Amusement park traveling throughout the New England region of the U.S.

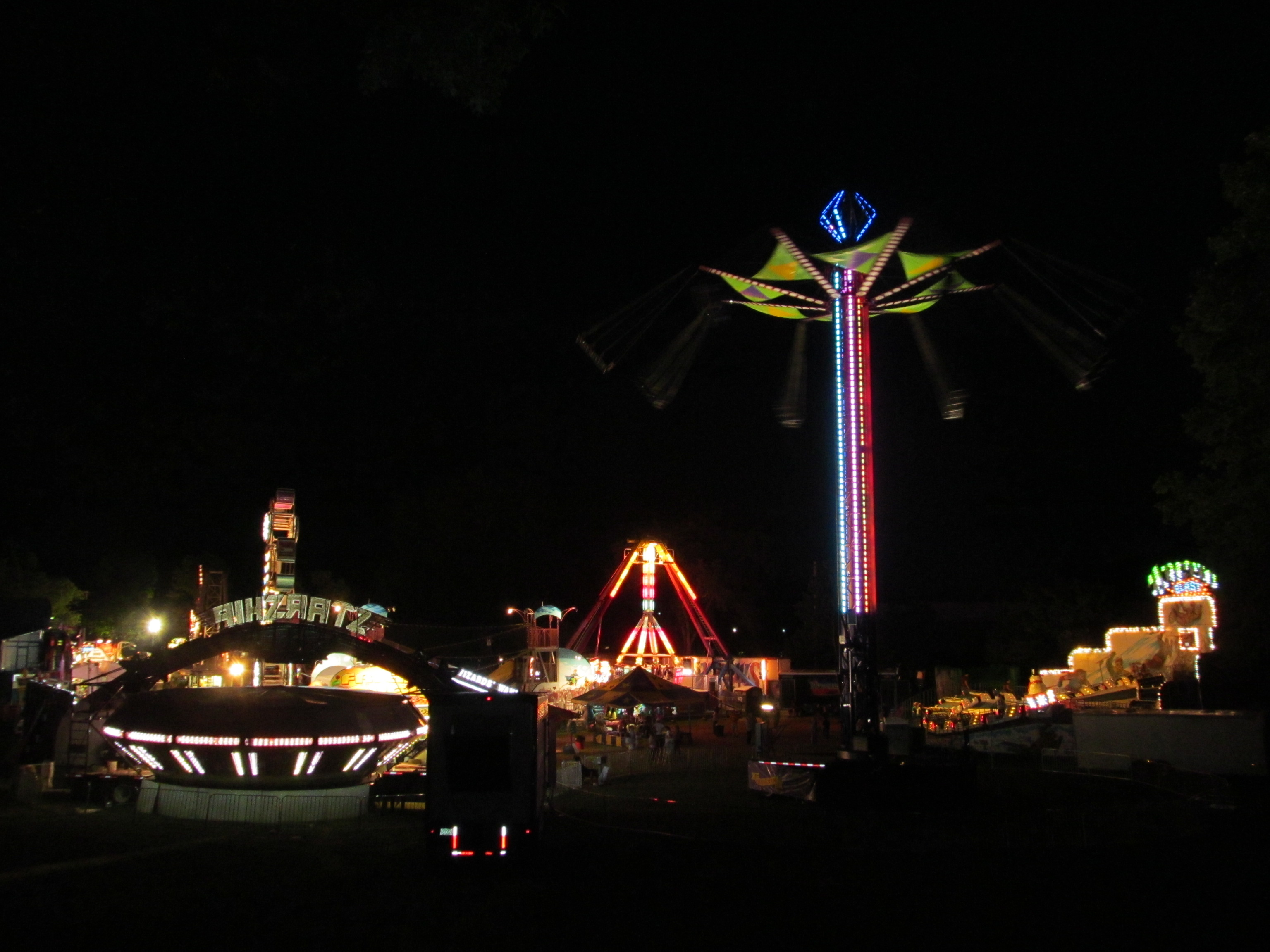
- 4th of July Carnival in Lexington, Massachusetts

Origin
- Country: United States
- Founder(s): Eugene Dean & Jack Flynn
- Year founded: 1935

Information
- Traveling show?: Yes
- Website: www.fiestashows.com

Fiesta Shows is a traveling carnival that entertains and visits over 60 communities throughout the New England region. It is New England's largest carnival.

== History ==
It was founded in Salisbury Beach, Massachusetts, in 1935 when Eugene Dean and Jack Flynn entered the amusement park business. Fiesta Shows has been in partnership with the Topsfield Fair for over 50 years. About 500,000 views come to the fair every year. In the year of 1967, Dean and Flynn purchased Fiesta Shows completely. Fiesta Shows is a traveling amusement park that features rides and concession set up for fairs and carnivals.

== Admission ==
At the gate, admission is usually 3 dollars to get into the carnival or fair.

To get on the rides and attractions, visitors need to purchase a Fair Pass (since 2021). Tickets were previously sold until the COVID-19 pandemic. Each ride now takes a certain amount of credits for anyone willing to participate on them (previously, a certain number of tickets).

== Game concessions ==
Typical game concessions.

== Rides ==
Here are a list of carnival rides that Fiesta Shows currently has (in alphabetical order).

=== Kiddie rides ===
- Berry Go Round: A spinny ride with strawberry shaped ride vehicles.
- Boomers' Circus: A miniature funhouse for kids.
- Boomers' Fire Engine: An emergency themed area for kids.
- Dalmatian Bounce: A bouncy house.
- Dizzy Dragons: Another spinny ride similar to the Berry Go Round, but with dragon shaped ride vehicles.
- Dragon Wagon: A small roller coaster for kids.
- Hot Shot: A drop tower ride for kids.
- Jungle Safari: A small car ride for kids.
- Kid Combo
- Mini Elephant: A flying elephant ride similar to Jumbo the Flying Elephant at Edaville.
- Mini Enterprise
- Mini Panda: A flying ride similar to the Mini Elephant.
- Mini Turtle: A spinny ride with turtle shaped ride vehicles.
- Rio Grande Train: A kiddie train ride.
- Street Racer: Another small car ride for kids.
- Swamp Gator: Another small roller coaster for kids.
- Tooterville: Another kiddie train ride similar to the Rio Grande Train. This model can also be found at Edaville as A.J.'s Express.
- Tractors: A spinny ride with tractor shaped ride vehicles.
- Umbrella Buggy: A spinny ride with car shaped ride vehicles underneath a canopy.

=== Family rides ===
- Bungee: An attraction where guests in harnesses jump and flip on a few trampolines.
- Carousel: A classic ride with horses and chariots. A fairground organ is mounted on the top of the ride giving it some music. Commonly ridden by little kids and their parents.
- Crazy Bus: A bus ride that sends kids and their parents around the backdrop of the ride held by two robotic arms and some force.
- Earthquake: An over the top funhouse filled with all sorts of tricks and gags!
- Fun Factory Under Construction: A new 2 story Gosetto funhouse
- Lucky Lizzy: A funhouse with moving floors, a rotating barrel, trick mirrors and other surprises. This attraction ends with a slide set 2 stories above the ground.
- Magic Maze: An attraction that is part glasshouse and part funhouse. Guests start by walking through the mirror maze in hopes of finding a secret staircase. Once the staircase is found, guests climb up to the second story and see a hall of mirrors. Guests can feel free to look into each mirror of the hall before sliding down the 2 story slide.
- Mardi Gras: An exact copy of Magic Maze, but with a different colored slide and decorations. Exact same experience of the attraction. Also owned by Rockwell Amusements.
- Mt. Rushmore Rockwall: A rock climbing wall for kids and adults to use.
- Orient Express: Another small roller coaster for kids similar to the Dragon Wagon.
- Rock'n Tug: A boat ride that rocks back and forth and spins around and around.
- Spinning Coaster: A roller coaster with ladybug shaped trains that move around a figure 8 track.
- Super Slide: A slide attraction for both kids and adults. Guests get mats and then they walk up the stairs to the top of the attraction. Once there, they ride down the 90 foot triple slide on their mats, with feet inside the mats.
- Tilt a Whirl: A classic ride for guests of all ages. The vehicles look like mini hatch shells. The ride goes in complete circles with the mini hatch shell vehicles spinning around multiple times very quickly.
- Tornado: A ride with big ball vehicles that you can spin to increase the speed of the ride.
- Toy Barn: A funhouse themed after the movie Toy Story.
- Vortex (also known as The House of Illusion): A walkthrough attraction featuring a spinning tunnel possibly making guests dizzy after going through this thing.
- Wizard's Wand: Sometimes referred to as Spider Mania at some carnivals and fairs. This is a walkthrough attraction where guests navigate through an obstacle course featuring bridges, punching bags and slides.

=== Major rides ===
- Castle of Evil: A dark ride where guests encounter ghosts, goblins and other creepy creatures lurking inside.
- Cliff Hanger: A ride where guests ride in hang glider shaped vehicles to give them the ability to fly at a 45 degree angle.
- Ferris Wheel: A classic ride named after George Ferris. Up to 3 adults can sit in each seat of the ride.
- Hyper Spin: A Tilt-A-Whirl style attraction.
- Pharaoh's Fury: An Egyptian themed swinging ship ride.
- Scooter: A traditional bumper cars ride.
- Starship Exodus: A Gravitron ride where guests are spun so quickly that they are quickly attached to the padded walls surrounding the spaceship dropping upwards due to the lack of gravity. Eventually, the ride slows down along with the guests on the walls after several minutes of flying away from Earth.
- Surfer: A spinny ride similar to any teacup ride you can find at an amusement park.
- Swinger: A traditional chair swing ride.
- Twister: A zany ride that spins and twists guests around.
- Viper: A ride that spins guests in all sorts of directions with all chairs swinging outward while the seat spindles rotate.
- Zero Gravity: Manufactured by Dartron, this ride is intense. At top speed, riders are laid against the wall as the center of the ride lifts up.
- Zipper: A Chance Rides Zipper is the most popular carnival ride ever. Two riders are locked in a cage rotating around a boom. As the ride goes faster and faster, the cage flips the riders in several front flips and back flips!
- Hurricane: A Alan Herschell thrill ride that uses compressed air to lift and drop riders as the ride rotates in a circle.

=== Spectacular rides ===
- Arctic Blast: An open top Himalaya attraction similar to the Music Express. At full speed, riders travel up and down the hills and valleys of the Himalaya.
- Expo Wheel: A giant ferris wheel that stands over 60 ft above the midway. At night, this ride lights up with LED lights.
- Fireball: A Larson International Super Loop
- Flying Bobs: A high speed music ride with cars swaying side to side as it picks up speed.
- Freak Out: A giant claw ride imported from the Netherlands and manufactured by KMG. Guests are strapped in with over the shoulder restraints. As the ride picks up speed, the claw moves back and forth for an increase in thrill.
- Haunted House: A walkthrough attraction with skeletons, zombies and more.
- Polar Express: Another high speed music ride similar to the Arctic Blast, except this ride is canopy covered.
- Seven Seas: A spectacular platform ride that takes guests left and right and very soon cresting the top. At this point, guests experience a free falling sensation.
- Super Cyclone Roller Coaster: A huge roller coaster with steep drops and sharp turns. Stands at 3 stories high.
- The Warrior: A giant claw ride imported from the Netherlands and manufactured by KMG. Guests are strapped in with over the shoulder restraints. As the ride picks up speed, the claw moves back and forth for an increase in thrill.
- Thunderbolt: Another high speed music ride similar to both the Arctic Blast and the Polar Express.
- Vertigo: A 60 foot tall swing ride. Feet of guests dangle in the air. With some extra wind combined with the height of this ride, your thrill factor might possibly increase!

== Food ==
This traveling amusement park serves carnival food. Here is a list of concession stands that are commonly available:

- Sausage Trailer: This concession stand serves cheeseburgers and hot dogs.
- Fry Trailer: This concession stand serves chicken tenders, corn dogs, fries, jalapeño peppers and mozzarella sticks.
- Floss Trailer: This concession stand serves cotton candy, popcorn and slush.
- Fried Dough Trailer: This concession stand only serves fried dough.
- Fried Sweets Trailer: This concession stand only serves fried sweets.
- Kettle Corn Trailer: This concession stand only serves kettle corn.

== About ==
Fiesta Shows continues to be New England's Largest Carnival. The company now holds over 100 amusement rides.

== Controversy ==
In the year of 2013, workers of Fiesta Shows sued the fair because the workers were being paid a flat rate of only $400 a week even though they were working 14-hour days, and sometimes as much as 22 hours in a single shift. This was a law dispute because it falls well under minimum wage. Fiesta Shows did not respond with any comments about the lawsuit.
