= William Appleton Coolidge =

Boston Brahmin Art Collector

William Appleton Coolidge (October 22, 1901 – May 24, 1992) was an American lawyer, financier, and art collector, known also as a philanthropist. From a Boston Brahmin background, he was Vice President of the Museum of Fine Arts and a noted art patron.

== Early life ==
Coolidge was born in Boston, to businessman Thomas Jefferson Coolidge, Jr., of the Old Colony Trust Co. and the United Fruit Company, and was a grandson of T. Jefferson Coolidge. He was one of four sons in the family. Through their mother Clara Gardner Amory, the brothers were grandsons of industrialist and company director Charles W. Amory.

Coolidge graduated cum laude from Harvard College in 1924. He went to Balliol College, Oxford, where he took a B.A. degree in 1927. He was an investment banker at Jackson & Curtis). Returning to Balliol in 1933, he spent a year in Oxford, before attending Harvard Law School. An associate lawyer at Ropes & Gray from 1936, Coolidge left to work at the United States Department of the Navy.

== Wartime period and the genesis of the National Research Corporation ==
In 1940 Coolidge was involved with the entrepreneur Richard S. Morse as a founder in the early stages of what became the National Research Corporation (NRC). This 1940 first vehicle for what became a career dealing in venture capital was called Enterprise Associates. This company then financed NRC, which when first incorporated in 1946 was called New Enterprises, Inc. It later took on the NRC name that was already in use. Enterprise Associates was backed by around 20 investors, including Daniel Frost Comstock, Henry I. Harriman and William Rand, and Daniel Frost Comstock. Georges Doriot advised on investments.

Not long after the company was set up, Coolidge moved in 1941 to Washington DC and engaged there in war work. Towards the end of World War II NRC participated in an effort to produce dried blood plasma which would be shipped to the USSR. The United States Army Quartermaster Corps wanted dried orange juice, and NRC set up a laboratory in Plymouth, Florida, using as for the blood project high vacuum drying.

In 1944, Coolidge, with Samuel Murray Robinson and others, was a witness for the House Naval Affairs Committee chaired by Carl Vinson. He spoke on his work as head of the Finance Office in the Office of Naval Material.

== Later life ==
With the end of the war, NRC continued R&D in the areas of blood plasma, and juice concentrate, with advances in optics, based on technological advances made by Morse. Coolidge and his associate Richard Nichols moved to rationalize the resulting businesses, and Hugh Ferguson took over from Morse. The Minute Maid Corporation emerged from this process.

In 1946 Coolidge was instrumental in founding the MIT spinoff company Tracerlab, via an introduction for William Barbour of MIT to the American Research and Development Corporation. In 1948 he was elected to the MIT Corporation.

In 1963, NRC, by then producing specialized aerospace products and other lines, merged into Norton Company, listed on the NYSE in 1962. Coolidge and Ferguson gained seats on the new board.

== Legacy ==
After Coolidge's death, his extensive art collection went to the Museum of Fine Arts, Boston. The Coolidge Estate, at Topsfield, Massachusetts and Coolidge's home, passed to MIT.

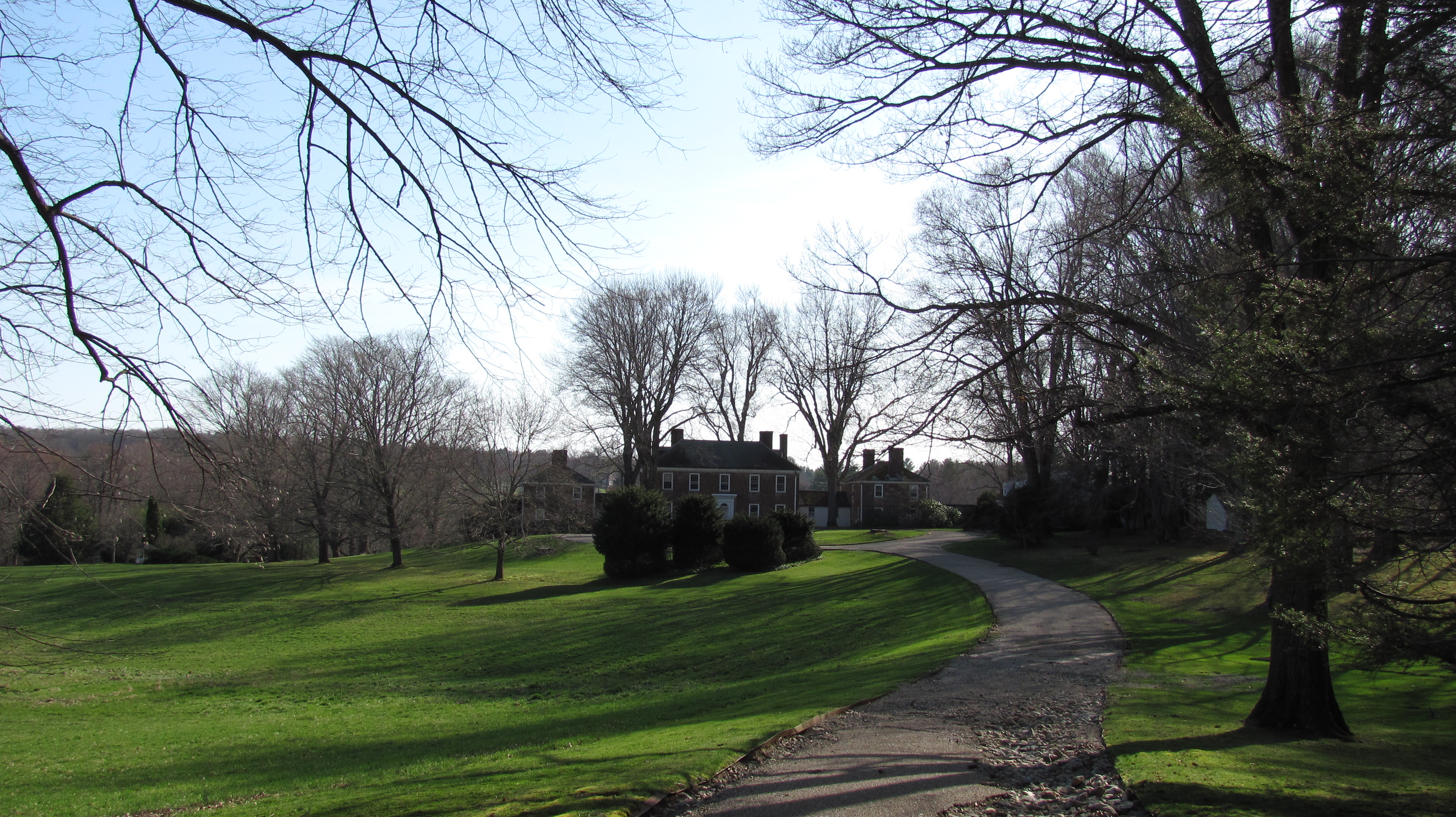
Coolidge Estate, at Topsfield, 2010 photograph

Coolidge contributed to the development of student accommodation at Balliol College, anonymously, while he was an undergraduate there. He later set up the Atlantic Crossing Trust (Pathfinder scheme) system of travel grants at Balliol. He gave money in 1990 to improve a building in Topsfield now called Coolidge Hall.
