= Old Farm =

Historic house in Massachusetts, United States

- U.S. National Register of Historic Places
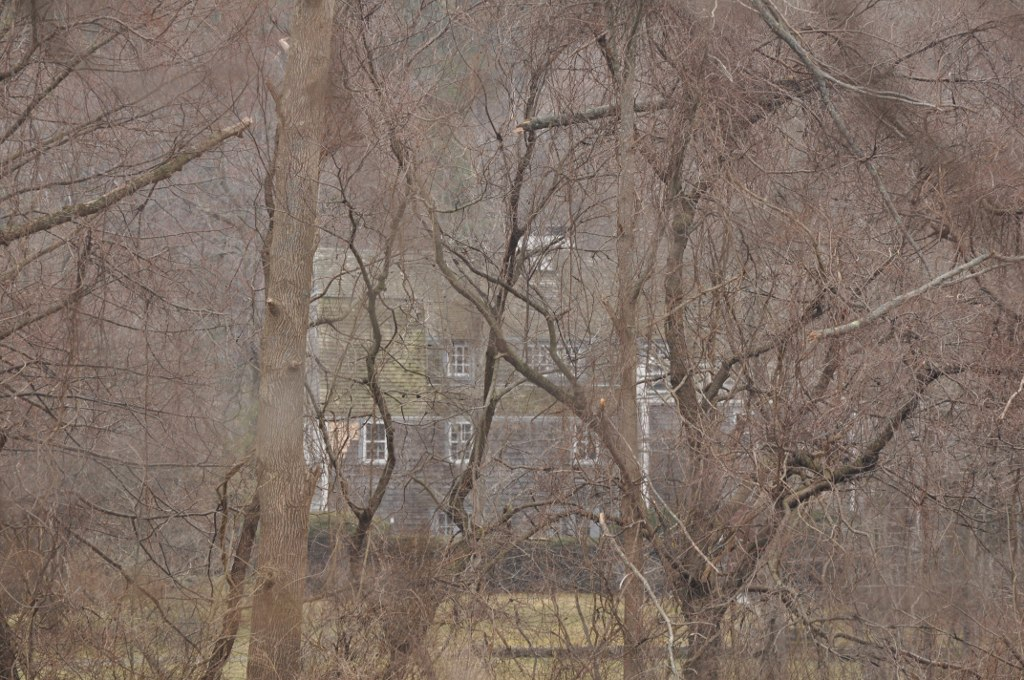

- Location within Massachusetts Location within the United States
- Location: 9 Maple Street, Wenham, Massachusetts
- Coordinates: 42°35′55″N 70°55′3″W
- Built: 1689
- Architectural style: Colonial
- MPS: First Period Buildings of Eastern Massachusetts TR
- NRHP reference No.: 90000265
- Added to NRHP: March 9, 1990

The Old Farm is a historic First Period house in Wenham, Massachusetts. The oldest part of the house, the left front and chimney, were built first, followed by the rooms to the right of the chimney, and a rear leanto section. This work was all done in the 17th century, but has not been dated with precision. In the late 19th century the rear section was raised to a full two stories, and the roof was rebuilt as a gambrel. The building underwent a major restoration effort in the early 20th century, led by Joseph Everett Chandler, a prominent restoration specialist. The restoration job was the subject of an article in a 1921 edition of House Beautiful.

The house was listed on the National Register of Historic Places in 1990.

== See also ==
- National Register of Historic Places listings in Essex County, Massachusetts
- List of the oldest buildings in Massachusetts
