= Pioneer Village (Salem, Massachusetts) =

Living history museum in Massachusetts, US

Coordinates: 42.5078°N 70.8852°W

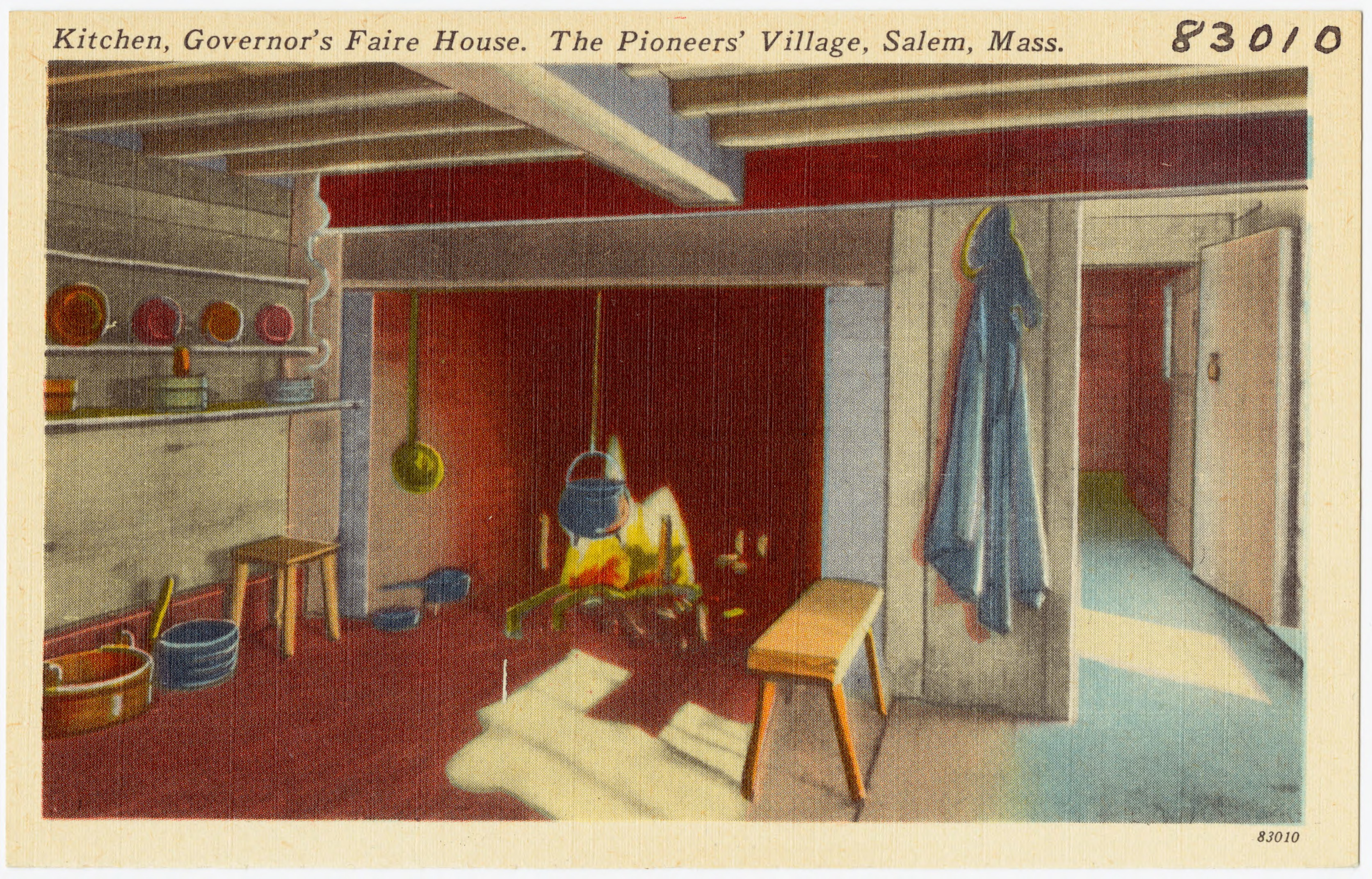
A postcard, circa 1930 or 1940, showing the kitchen in the Governor's Faire House in Pioneer Village

Pioneer Village, also known as Salem 1630: Pioneer Village, is a living history museum recreating the city of Salem as it was in the 17th century. Opened in June 1930, it was the first museum of its kind in the United States.

The village was created for visitors to experience the lives of early English settlers instead of reading about them. Visitors can see a blacksmith’s shop, a sawmill, a saltworks, gardens, fireplaces, a dugout, a wigwam, and thatched roof cottages. The featured attraction upon opening was the Governor’s House, a “fayre house” representing what the house might have looked like after it had been disassembled in Cape Ann, brought over to Salem, and rebuilt for Governor John Endicott in 1628. Dimensional details for the replica had been worked out by George Francis Dow.

Pioneer Village is currently operated by the City of Salem's Witch House, a 17th-century home once owned by witchcraft trials judge, Jonathan Corwin.

== Site history ==
Joseph Everett Chandler, an architect, and George Francis Dow conceived the village as a means to demonstrate life in 1630. They "engaged other experts and architects to help pull it off" before the Tercentenary celebrations. Noted landscape architect Harlan Page Kelsey drew up the plan. Philip Horton Smith planned the restoration of the Ruck House. They created one of "America's first living history museums" which the city of Salem committed to preserve in perpetuity."

The site was created in 1930 as the set for a play, held in Forest River Park in Salem, Massachusetts. Audience members sat in the park and watched the re-creation of what Salem, Massachusetts, may have looked like in June 1630 upon the arrival of John Winthrop and the families of Thomas Dudley and Simon Bradstreet, including America's first published poet of significance, Anne Bradstreet, daughter of Thomas and wife of Simon. A replica of the Arbella, the flagship of the Winthrop Fleet, was also built at this time.

The set was meant to be temporary, but its popularity with the people of Essex County, Massachusetts led to it being saved from re-development. Salem Pioneer Village, the first living history museum in the United States, opened in June 1930.

In 2020 the City of Salem, under the leadership of Mayor Kim Driscoll, began a project that would move some but not all of the buildings from Pioneer Village to the Camp Naumkeag site. In 1986 the Salem Historical Commission deemed Pioneer Village historic and attempted to have it listed on the National Register of Historic Places. It was not listed at that time. A 2021 inventory of historic structures reaffirmed the historic nature of the site, expanded the categories for preservation and again recommended listing Pioneer Village on the National Register.

== Tours and events ==
The Village is currently open Saturdays and Sundays 12-4 for self-guided tours.

October programming normally features evening tours and performances.

== In popular culture ==
- In 1993, Pioneer Village was used to represent 1693 Salem in the opening scene of fantasy comedy film Hocus Pocus, released by Walt Disney Pictures.
