= Joseph Capen =

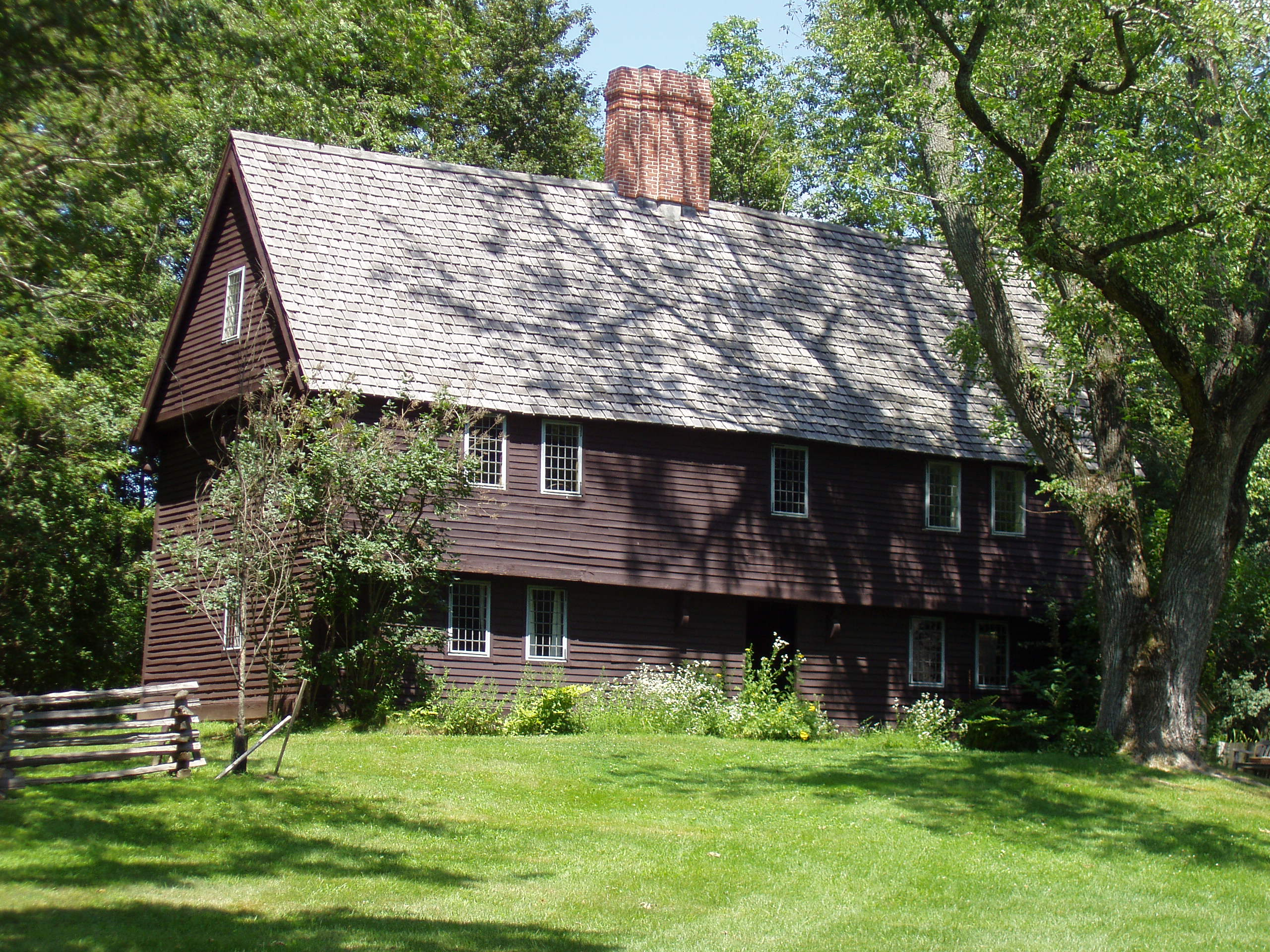
Parson Capen House, built in 1683

Joseph Capen (1658–1725) was a Massachusetts clergyman. Capen was the son of John Capen of Dorchester, Massachusetts, by his second wife, Mary, the daughter of Samuel Bass of Braintree. Joseph Capen was a member of the class of 1677 at Harvard and was a minister in Topsfield, Massachusetts, from 1682 to his death in 1725. Capen moved to Topsfield, Massachusetts, in 1682 to become the minister of the Topsfield town church. He was ordained as the successor of Jeremiah Hobart in 1684. His predecessors set his prospects low: two of the past three ministers were unable to collect their salaries, and one of them went on trial for intemperance. He had 7 children by his wife, Priscilla (1657–1743). After his death, Capen was succeeded by the minister John Emerson.

In addition to his annual salary, the town granted Capen 12 acres of "land & medow [sic] & swamp" where he built his parsonage house, known today as the Parson Capen House. Erected in 1683, this building has been preserved by the Topsfield Historical Society since 1913. It has been described by the National Park Service as “a perfect specimen of a New England colonial residence [and] also of the English manor house in America.”

During the Salem Witch Trials of 1692, a member of Capen's congregation, Mary Eastey, was hanged for witchcraft. On July 8, 1703, Capen was among many other ministers who signed an address to the general court that asked to formally clear the names of the accused. Several eulogies written by Capen have also been preserved.
