= Ballou-Newbegin House =

Historic house in New Hampshire, United States

- U.S. National Register of Historic Places
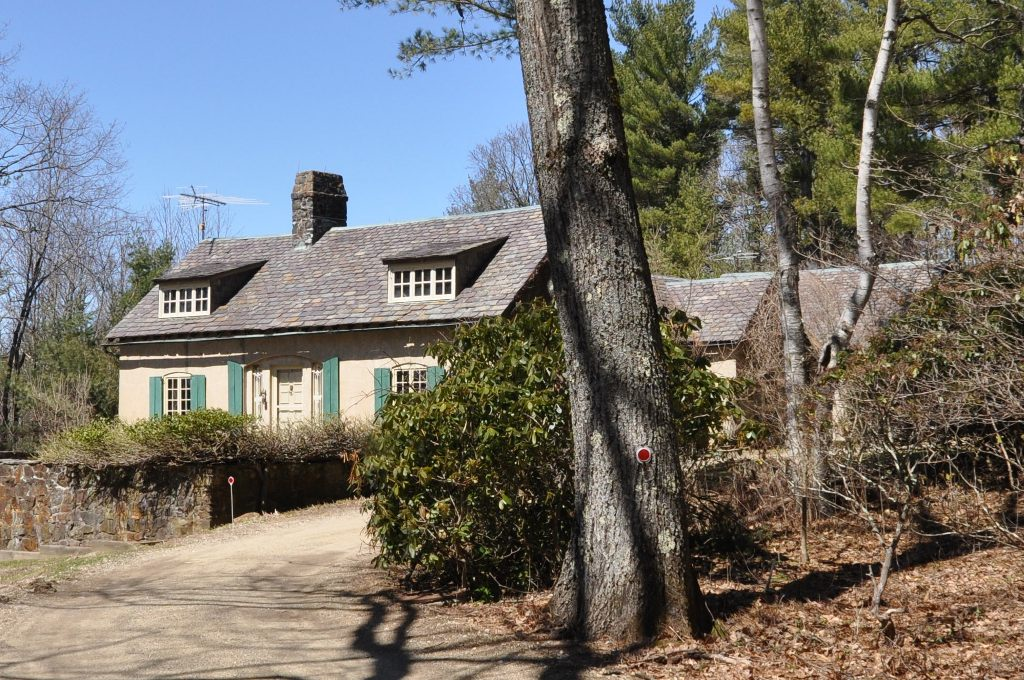

- Location within New Hampshire Location within the United States
- Location: Old Marlborough Rd., Dublin, New Hampshire
- Coordinates: 42°53′39″N 72°8′38″W
- Area: 0.2 acres (0.081 ha)
- Built: 1933
- Architect: Chandler, Joseph Everett
- Architectural style: Anglo-Renaissance Revival
- MPS: Dublin MRA
- NRHP reference No.: 83004011
- Added to NRHP: December 18, 1983

The Ballou-Newbegin House is a historic house on Old Marlborough Road in Dublin, New Hampshire. Built in 1933, it is a good example of a house built as a summer residence in the style of an English country cottage. The house, since adapted for year-round use, was listed on the National Register of Historic Places in 1983.

== Description and history ==
The Ballou-Newbegin House is located in a rural setting in western Dublin, just east of the junction of Old Marlboro and East Shore roads. It is set down a long drive on the north side of Old Marlboro Road, in a landscaped opening in the woods that includes a terraced formal garden. It is a rambling 1½-story frame structure, its exterior finished in stucco and covered by a gabled slate roof. A fieldstone chimney rises at the center of the building, and there are shed-roof dormers on the front roof face. The main facade is three bays wide, with doubled casement windows set in segmented-arch openings on either side of the main entrance. The entrance is also set in a large segmented-arch opening along with sidelight windows.

The house was designed by Joseph Everett Chandler, a noted Boston architect who oversaw the restoration of the Paul Revere House and the House of Seven Gables, and built in 1933. The house has elements of English Revival, resembling in some ways a Cotswold cottage, however with Italian features. The property was previously owned by Ellen Ballou, a historian and author.

== See also ==
- National Register of Historic Places listings in Cheshire County, New Hampshire
