= Coolidge Estate =

Estate in Topsfield, Massachusetts

Coordinates: 42°37′49.52″N 70°57′30.15″W

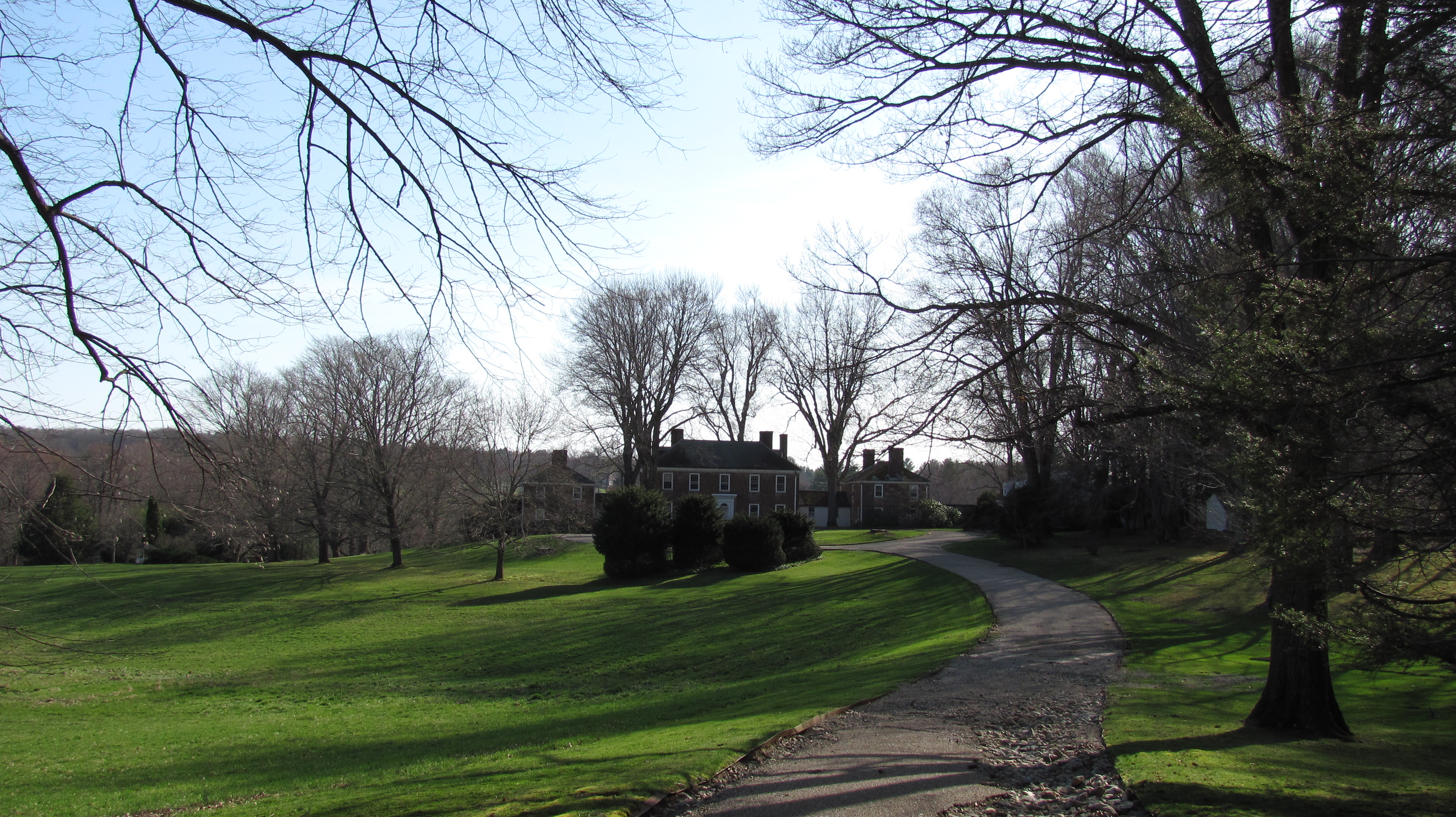
Coolidge Estate

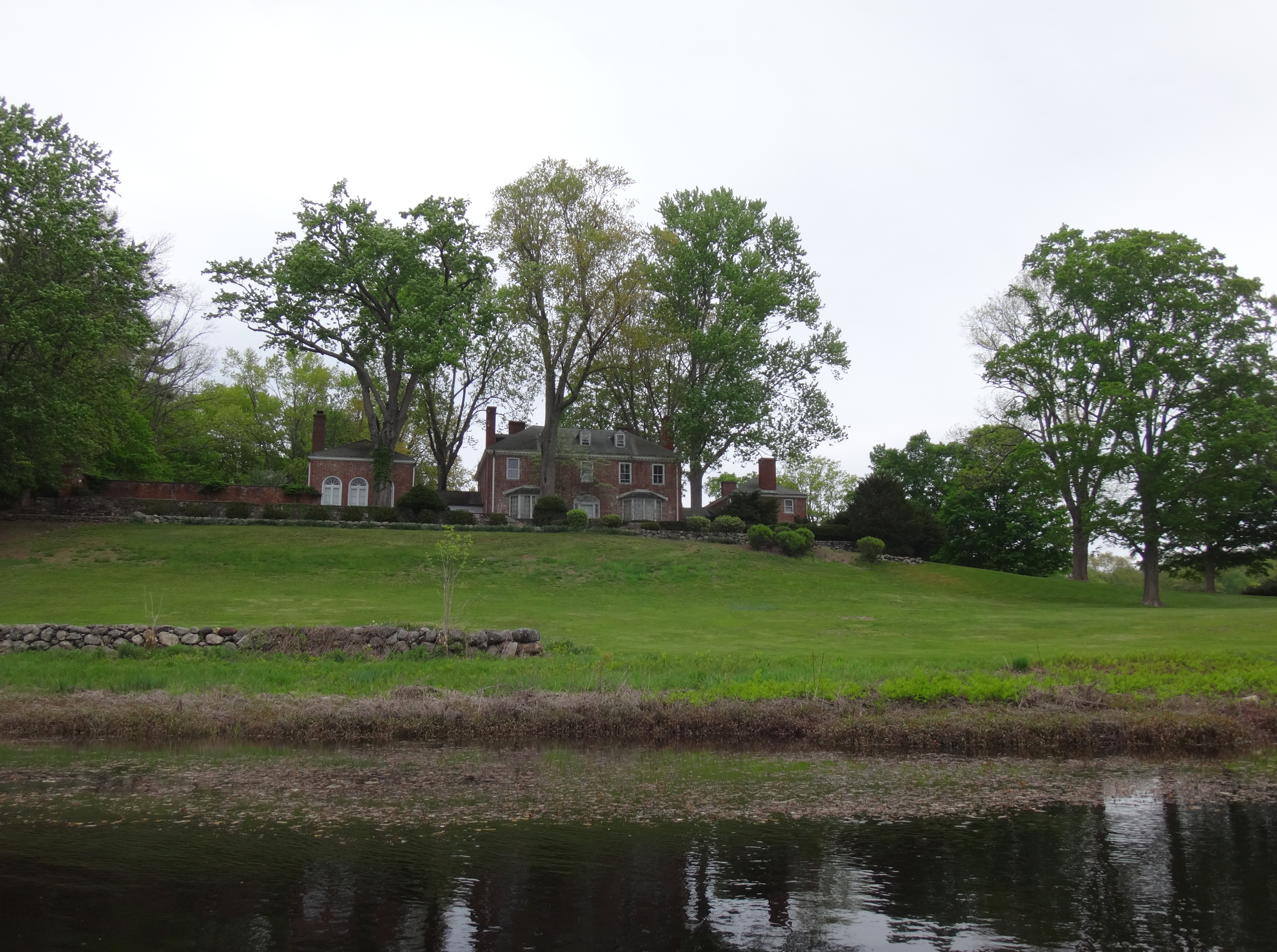
Coolidge Estate

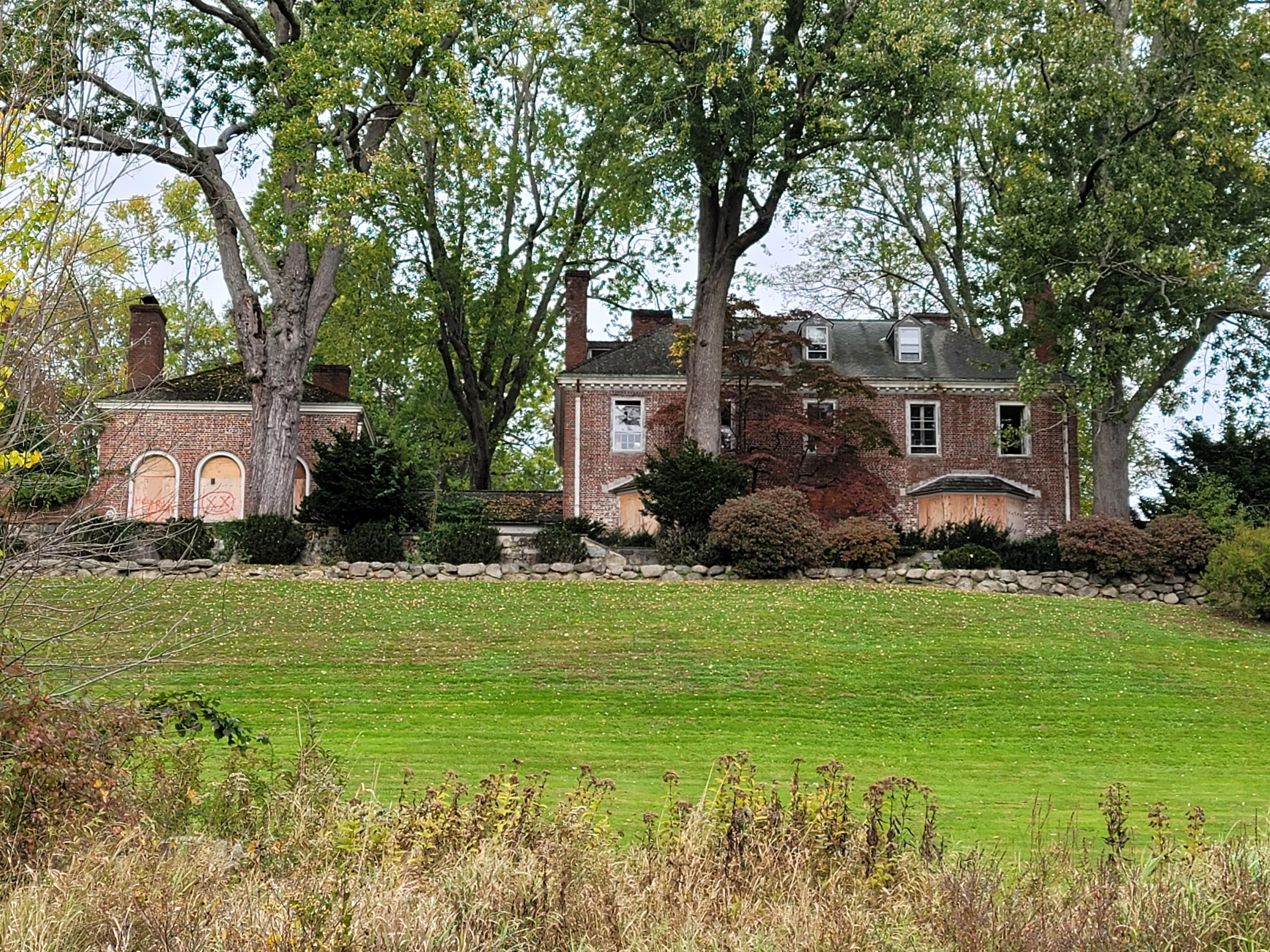
Coolidge Estate

Huntwicke, located in Topsfield, Massachusetts, is the former property of William A. Coolidge, a lawyer, financier, and art collector. Spanning 571 acres (2.31 km^{2}), it encompasses a 24-room Georgian-style mansion designed by architect Phillip Richardson in 1921 for John L. Saltonstall, other buildings, and landscaping by the firm of Frederick Law Olmsted. The brick mansion includes 14 bedrooms, six fireplaces, parquet floors, hand-carved wood paneling from the 1790 Nathaniel Saltonstall house in Haverhill, and extensive gardens. When Coolidge died in 1992, the Massachusetts Institute of Technology inherited the property. In 2000, MIT and the Essex County Greenbelt Association, a conservation organization and private, non-profit land trust, reached an agreement to restrict further development, and the former estate, which includes over a mile of land along the Ipswich River, is now one of the largest conservation areas in private hands in Massachusetts.

As of 2023, the main buildings have experienced significant vandalism, are structurally unsafe and have been boarded up and condemned.
