= Topsfield Fair =

Annual county fair in Massachusetts, US

Topsfield County Fair
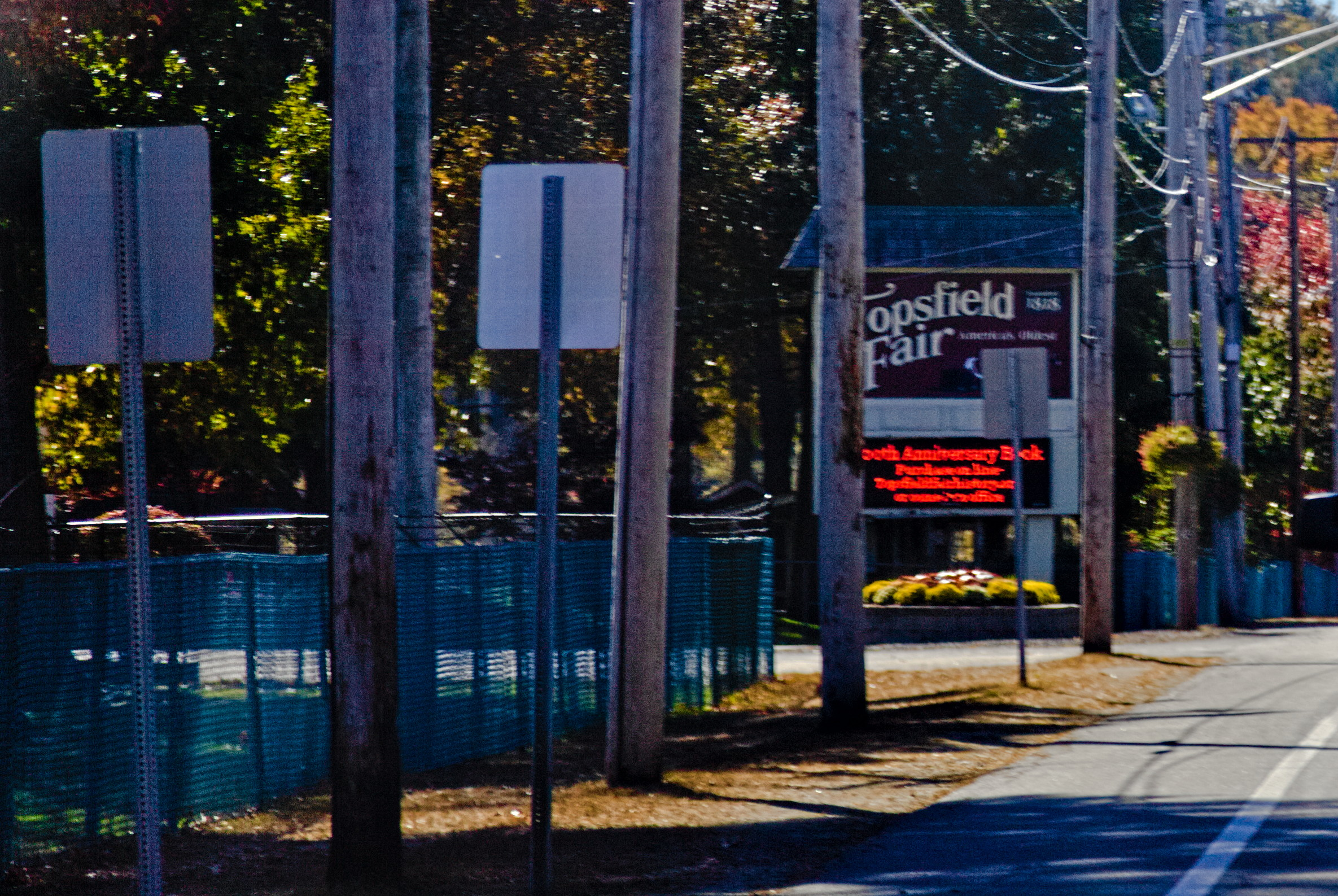
- Genre: County fair
- Dates: 10 days; scheduled to conclude every year on the Monday of Columbus Day
- Location: Topsfield, Massachusetts
- Years active: 1818–present (excluding 1918, 1943-45, 2020)
- Attendance: 450,000–500,000
- Website: topsfieldfair.org

The Topsfield Fair is an annual county fair located in Topsfield, Massachusetts. The Topsfield Fair is known as America's Oldest County Fair. Started in 1818 by the Essex County Agricultural Society, the Topsfield Fair was originally a one-day cattle show. The goal of the society was to showcase agriculture in order to educate the public as well as provide somewhere for farmers to exchange ideas and methods. The fair draws between 450,000 and 500,000 people over its 10-day event period. It is home to a large midway, an arena with ongoing events throughout the year, as well as many agricultural exhibitions.

== History ==
The Topsfield Fair began in February 1818 with the founding of the Essex Agricultural Society headed by Timothy Pickering. In 1820, the society held its first event, a cattle show. The intent was to have an arena in which local farmers could engage in friendly competition as well as exchange ideas and methods about agriculture. Early events at these shows included cattle shows, oxen pulls, and plowing matches. From the years of 1820 to 1895 the fair was held in a variety of locations across Essex County. In 1895, the Fair began a 15-year residence in Peabody when it bought a 50-acre plot. In 1910, the Fair moved to its current location in Topsfield, a 150-acre experimental farm that had been given to the society in 1856. Most of the agricultural and exhibition barns that are a part of the present day Topsfield Fair were erected in between 1921 and 1925. In its 206-year history, the fair has been cancelled thrice: 1918 (Spanish flu), 1943–1945 (World War II), and 2020 (COVID-19 pandemic).

Significant Events in Fair History
Year	Event
1818	Essex Agricultural Society founded
1820	First cattle show
1856	Treadwell Farm (site of current fair) donated to the Agricultural Society
1893	First multi-day fair held in Haverhill
1895	Peabody becomes the site for the fair
1910	Fair permanently moved to Topsfield
1918	Fair cancelled due to Spanish flu pandemic
1921–1925	Most current exhibition halls built
1938	Fair expands to 5 days
1943–1945	Fair suspended due to World War II
1950	Fiesta Shows contracted to bring a midway to the fair
1979	First opening-day parade held
2018	Essex Agricultural Society Bicentennial
2020	Fair not held (COVID-19 pandemic)

== Present-day fair ==
Today the fair runs 10 days ending every year on the Monday of Columbus Day. Admission ranges from $10–20, depending on pre-sale and weekend admission. There are also discounts available for children, military members, and senior citizens. Although the fair runs 10 days from Saturday to Monday, the Friday before the fair has typically been known as Topsfield Night. Traditionally this was a night for Topsfield Residents and friends, however in recent years it has been opened to the general public although Topsfield residents still get free admission.

The official opening of the fair occurs each year with the annual parade and opening ceremony. The parade is typically marshaled by local politicians, community members, and other local figures. Some notable marshals/opening ceremony attendees have included Johnny Bucyk who marshaled the 200th anniversary parade, Governor Charlie Baker, and Gisele Bündchen. The parade itself includes performance by local middle and high school bands including the Proctor School Elementary School Band, the Masconomet Regional High School Band, and the Danvers High School Band. The parade also features local police and fire departments, local boy and girl scout troops, and floats from local companies.

=== Midway ===
Although not part of the original fair, the midway has become one of the major attractions of the Topsfield Fair. The midway has been a major part of the fair since 1950 when Fiesta Shows was contracted to bring rides and entertainment to the fair. Major attractions include carnival rides aimed towards all ages, carnival games, and food. The rides that are used at the fair typically are broken up into four sections by Fiesta Shows - Kid Rides, Family Rides, Major Rides, and Spectacular Rides and aim to cater to people of all ages. Rides typically cost between 3–5 tickets depending on the size and thrill of the ride which can be purchased from Fiesta Shows. In addition the Fair sells pre-sale tickets at discounted rates. Carnival games at the fair are typically "pay until you win" games such as darts, ring toss, and duck pond, or competition type games such as the water gun game.

Food at the fair is provided both by Fiesta Shows as well as local retailers and community members. Fiesta Shows runs a variety of traditional fair food stands including a hot dog and hamburger, fried dough stands, french fry stands, sausage stands, and a fried candy stand. In addition to the food provided by Fiesta shows local restaurants and communities provide a variety of more tradition New England fall food. One booth in particular run by the Congregation Church of Topsfield has been serving turkey dinners since before 1920. In 2015 the church served over 2,500 dinners raising funds for charity. Other local food includes Whoopie pies by the Topsfield Bakeshop, a baked potato booth, and boy scout run food stands. Overall there are nearly 300 vendors selling food and other items at the fair.

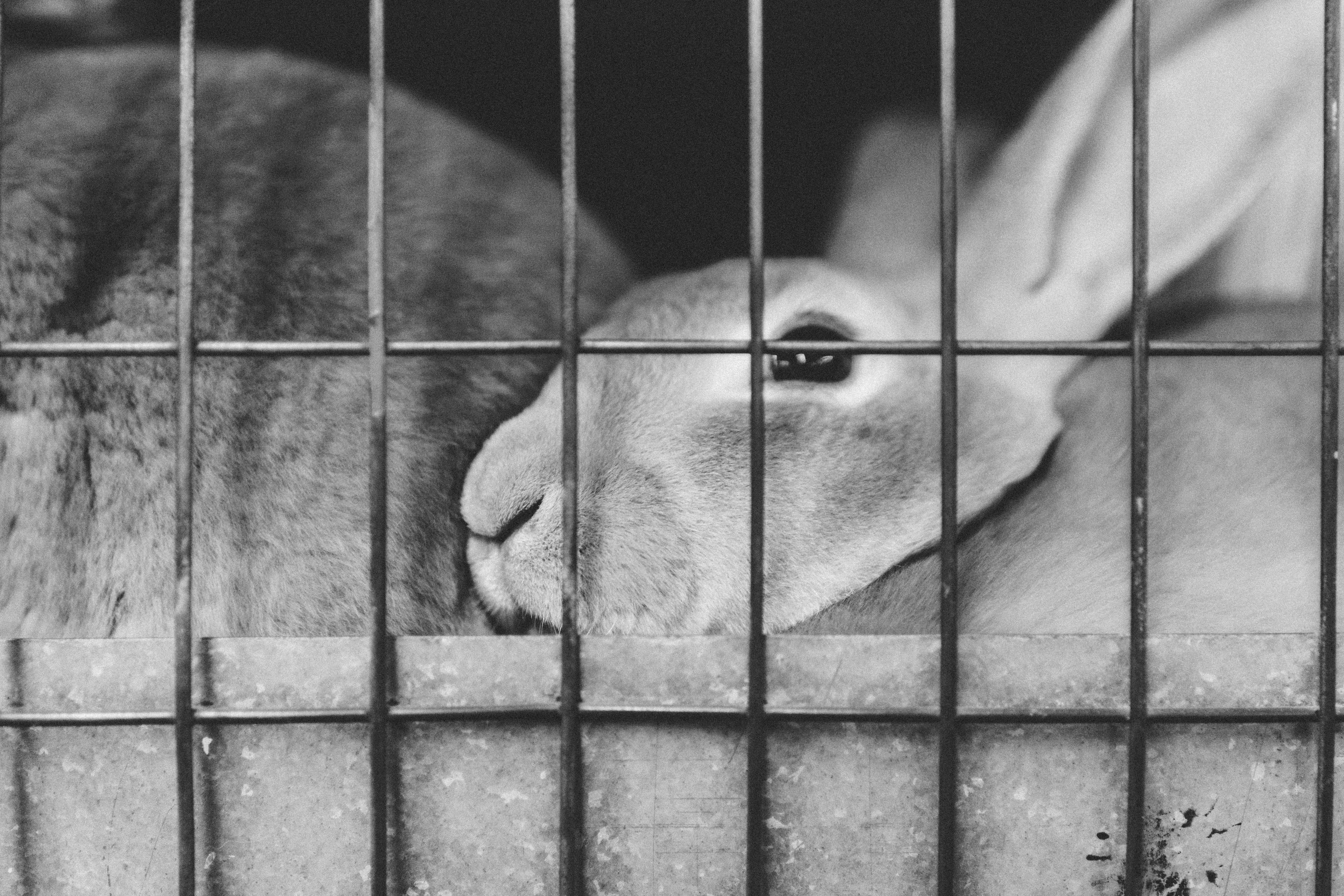
A Rabbit pictured at the Rabbits and Cavies Barn

=== Exhibitions ===
The exhibition halls are central to the design of the fair. The halls are a way for local farmers and residents to show off their animals and produce. There are also several arts and crafts barns where local professional and armature artist and photographers can display pieces for both competition and sale. Exhibitions include:

- Beekeeping and honey run by the Essex County Beekeepers Association
- Cattle barn
- Goat and sheep barn
- Flower barn
- Fruit barn
- Rabbits and cavies barn
- Coolidge Hall (arts and crafts exhibition)
- Poultry barn

In addition to the exhibition halls there is a central arena which is used for major events throughout the week of the fair. At a typical fair the area host the great pumpkin weigh off, several concerts by local and national artists, horse shows, monster truck shows, and demolition derbies. Notable past performers include: The Charlie Daniels Band; Sara Evans; Martina McBride; Royal Canadian Mounted Police; Red Guard.

=== Great Pumpkin Weigh Off ===
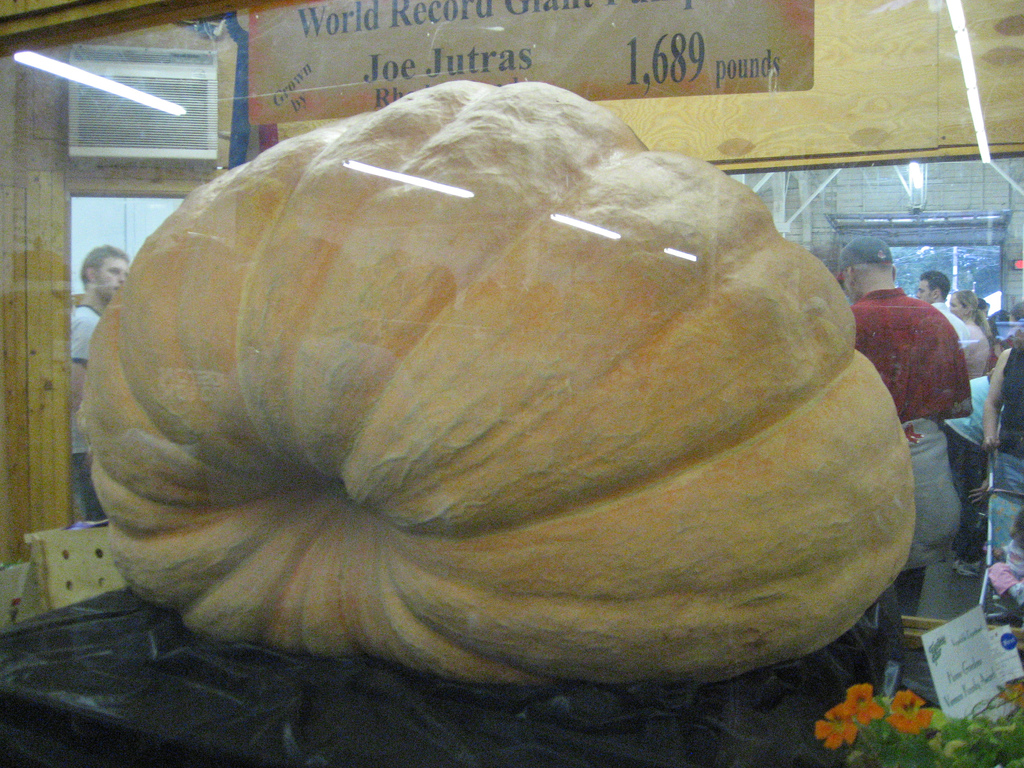
The World Record setting pumpkin from 2007. Grown by Joe Jutras it weighed in at 1689 pounds.

One of the most well known competitions at the fair is the Great Pumpkin Weigh Off. Each year the pumpkin weigh off takes place of the first day of the fair in the arena. The weigh off began in 1984 with the winning pumpkin weighing 433 pounds. Since then, pumpkins have grown to weigh over 2,000 lb with the current record pumpkin weighing in at 2,114 lb. Over the years, the Topsfield Fair has been home to several world record pumpkins. In 2012, the first pumpkin to break the one-ton barrier was weighed at the Fair. After the weigh off the winning pumpkin is displayed in a centerpiece at the Fruits and Vegetable barn.

Notable Pumpkins
Year	Gardener	Pumpkin Weight	Reason
2019	Alex Noel	2294.5lb	Heaviest pumpkin of the 2019 fair "Giant Pumpkin Weigh-Off"
2018	Ron Wallace	2114lb	Current Topsfield Fair Champion
2012	Ron Wallace	2009lb	World First One-Ton Pumpkin
2007	Joe Jutras	1689lb	Former World Record Pumpkin
2006	Ron Wallace	1502lb	Former World Record Pumpkin
2002	Charlie Houghton	1337lb	Former World Record Pumpkin – Guinness World Record
