= Joseph Everett Chandler =

American architect (1863–1945)

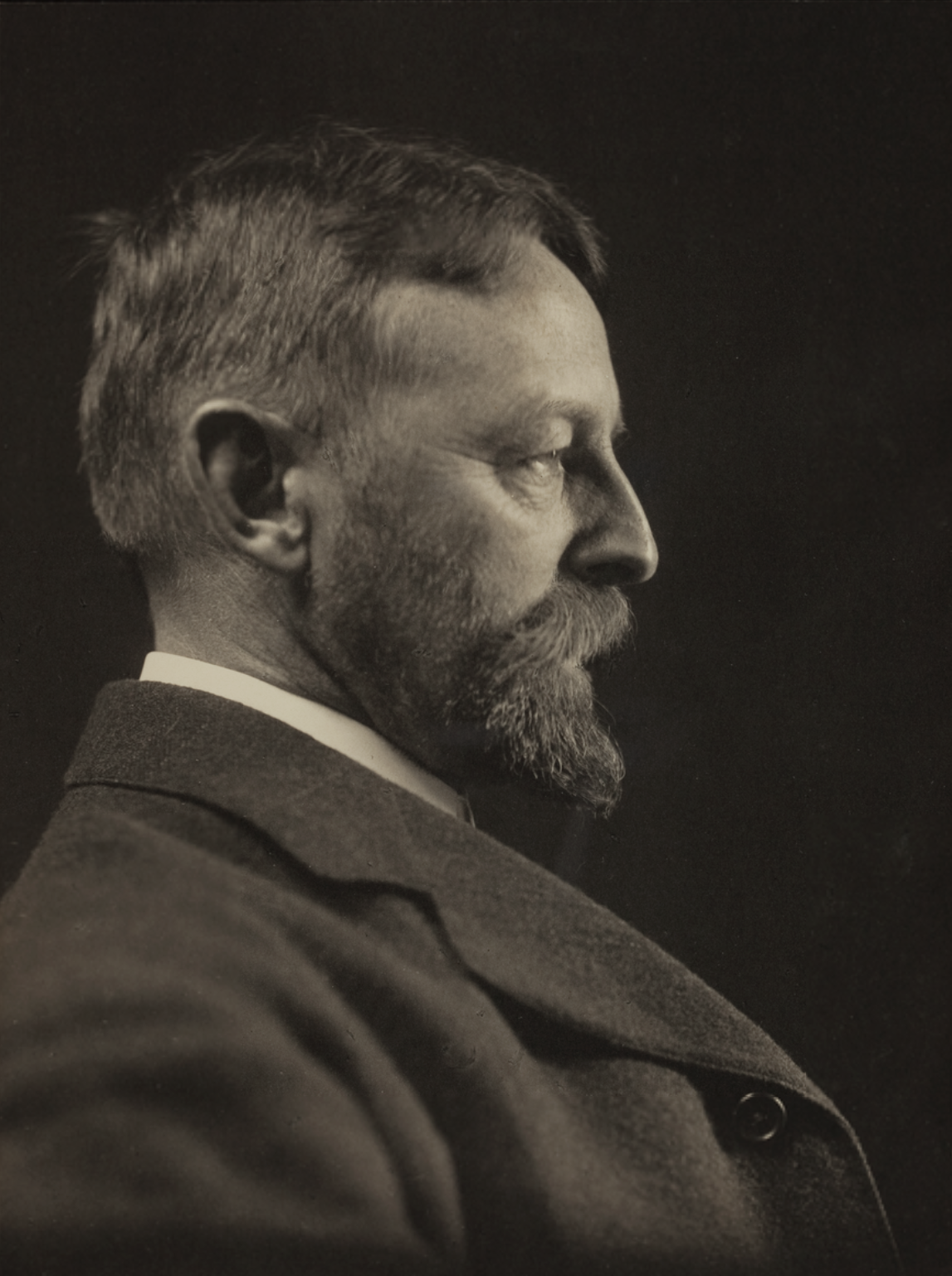
- Born: December 11, 1863; Plymouth, Massachusetts
- Died: August 19, 1945 (aged 81); Wellesley, Massachusetts
- Occupation: Architect
- Buildings: Frederic C. Adams Public Library; Wright Memorial Library; Ballou-Newbegin House
- Projects: Pioneer Village; Paul Revere House restoration; House of the Seven Gables restoration

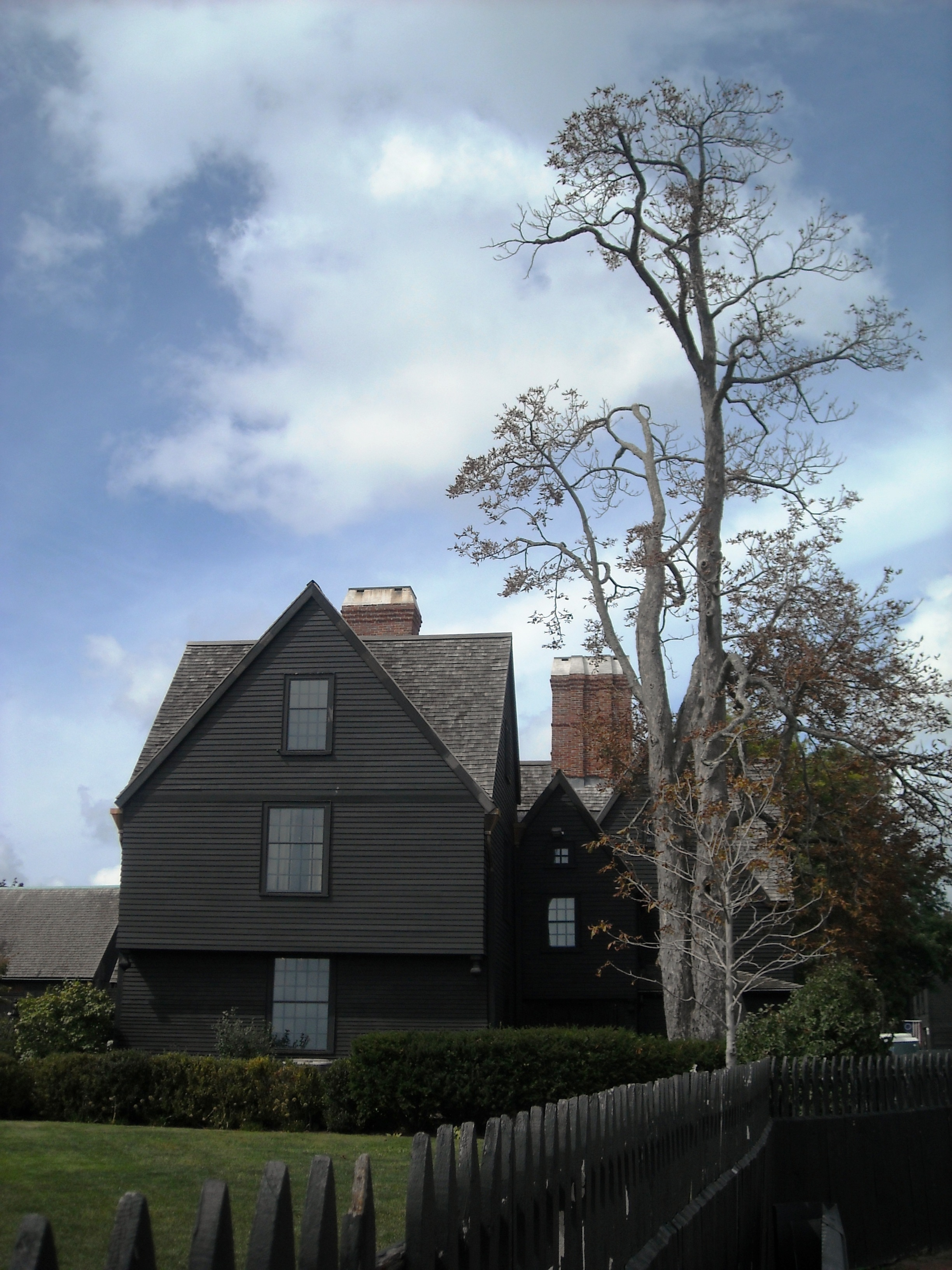
House of the Seven Gables

Joseph Everett Chandler (December 11, 1863 – August 19, 1945) was an American architect. He is considered a major proponent of the Colonial Revival architecture.

== Biography ==
Joseph Everett Chandler was born in Plymouth, Massachusetts, the son of a butcher. He grew up driving carriage-loads of tourists around Plymouth to see its sites.

Chandler attended the Massachusetts Institute of Technology (M.I.T.) and was an apprentice of McKim, Mead & White, Charles Howard Walker, William Pretyman, Burnham and Root, and Rotch & Tilden.

He is considered a pioneering designer of queer space. He designed Red Roof for A. Piatt Andrew, which inspired interior designer Henry Davis Sleeper to build his own Beauport next door.

He died in Wellesley, Massachusetts, on August 19, 1945.

== Career ==
Chandler is mostly known to have overseen the restoration of the Paul Revere House and the House of Seven Gables. He worked with George Warren Cole.

With George Francis Dow, he conceived Pioneer Village as a means to demonstrate life in 1630.

In 1892 he published The Colonial Architecture of Maryland, Pennsylvania, and Virginia and in 1916 The colonial house with R. M. McBride & company.

== Works ==
- 1898: designed The Frederic C. Adams Public Library, an historic library building at 33 Summer Street in Kingston, Massachusetts. The library was added to the National Register of Historic Places in 2001.
- 1898: restored the Isaac Royall House.
- 1900s: restored The Old Farm, an historic First Period house at 9 Maple Street in Wenham, Massachusetts. The restoration job was the subject of an article in a 1921 edition of House Beautiful. The house was listed on the National Register of Historic Places in 1990.
- 1902: restored the Paul Revere House.
- 1902: designed Red Roof for A. Piatt Andrew (demolished)
- 1907: headed a restoration of Boston's Old State House, which was built in 1713.
- 1909: designed the Wright Memorial Library. Georgianna Wright (1837–1919) hired Chandler to design a brick library in the colonial revival style. It was listed on the National Register of Historic Places in July 2007.
- 1909: restored the Rebecca Nurse Homestead. Rebecca Nurse Memorial Association (disbanded 1927) hired Chandler to restore the clapboard home to roughly 1636.
- 1908 to 1910: restored the House of the Seven Gables.
- 1913: designed Marsh Room, the double-height hall of the Harvard Musical Association, of which Chandler was a member.
- 1914 to 1918: remodeled two late-Federal period farmhouses to become The Stevens–Coolidge Place. Also enhanced the design of the landscape, which eventually included a perennial garden, a kitch and flower garden, and a rose garden (all in the Colonial Revival style).
- 1920: Hammond House Alteration Original House of Thomas Hammond, owned by William H. Coburn Esquire at time of restoration.
- 1921: restored the Harlow Old Fort House. In 1974 the house was added to the National Register of Historic Places.
- 1933: designed The Ballou-Newbegin House, an historic house on Old Marlborough Road in Dublin, New Hampshire. The house was listed on the National Register of Historic Places in 1983.
