= Frederic C. Adams Public Library =

- U.S. National Register of Historic Places
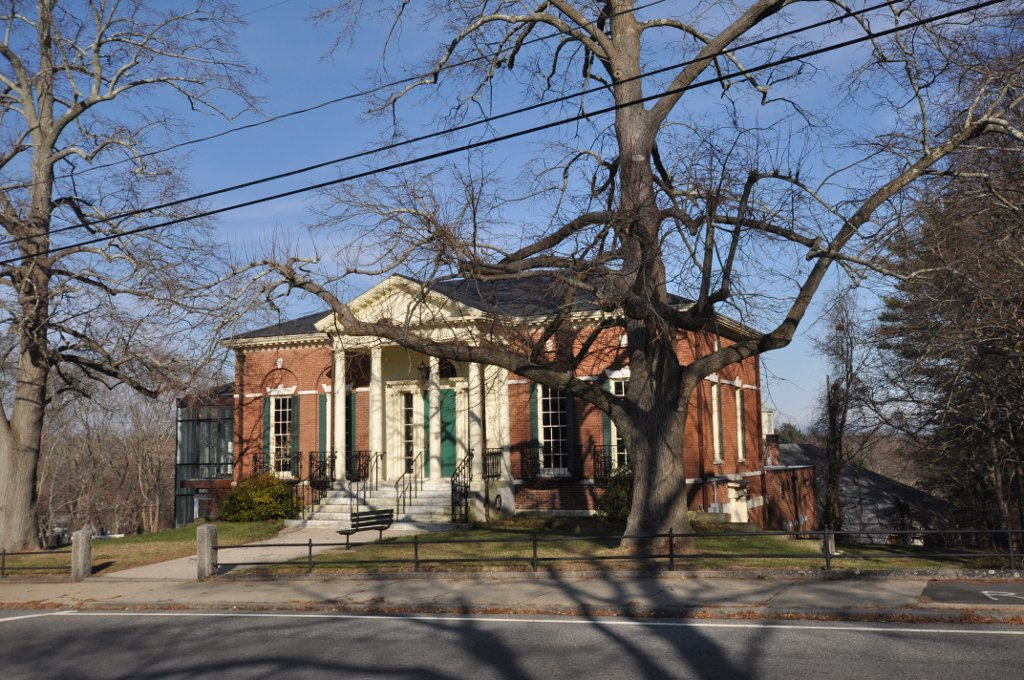

- Location within Massachusetts Location within the United States
- Location: 33 Summer St., Kingston, Massachusetts
- Coordinates: 41°59′45″N 70°43′48″W
- Area: less than one acre
- Built: 1898
- Architect: Joseph Everett Chandler
- Architectural style: Colonial Revival
- NRHP reference No.: 01000625
- Added to NRHP: June 6, 2001

The Frederic C. Adams Public Library is a historic library building at 33 Summer Street in Kingston, Massachusetts. Designed by Joseph Everett Chandler (1864–1945), a major proponent of the Colonial Revival style, the library was built in 1898 and added to the National Register of Historic Places in 2001. The building ceased operation as a public library in December 1994, when the town opened the new Kingston Public Library at 6 Green Street.

== Description and history ==
The Adams Library building is located in Kingston's village center, on the east side of Summer Street (Massachusetts Route 3A) at its junction with Green Street. It is a 1-1/2 story masonry structure, with a gabled roof and walls of brick with stone trim. The main facade is five bays wide, with a dentillated cornice and a stringcourse of stone at the top of the windows and entry. The entrance is framed by wide sidelight windows and sheltered by a four-column Corinthian portico. Windows are set in recessed panels with splayed keystone lintels and a half-round blind arch above.

The Kingston Public Library's organizational history dates to 1871, when the Kingston Library Association was founded. Its collection was held in a local retail establishment, and in 1890 fundraising began for the construction of a dedicated facility. Frederic C. Adams was a native of Kingston, who owned a local stockyard and slaughterhouse. On his death in 1874 he left $5,000 to the town for the construction of a library. The library was completed in 1898 to a design by Joseph Chandler of Plymouth. An addition was made to the rear in 1965, but the library continued to grow, and moved into new quarters across the street in 1994.

The building was restored, and rededicated as the Adams Center in November 2012. On March 12, 2013, the Kingston Board of Selectmen created the Adams Center Board of Trustees "to secure optimal use of the Adams Center for the benefit of the Citizens of Kingston." Restoration allowed the building to be used as a venue for multiple cultural events. From 2012 to 2019, the building was available for rental for group events, small conferences, corporate meetings, seminars and private functions.

In the spring 2019, the Adams Center was placed under the control of the Director of the Kingston Public Library. The Adams Center Board of Trustees subsequently resigned as a group. In the summer of 2019, the Library moved its Local History Collections to the Adams where they are available to the public. The main hall upstairs and a small meeting room downstairs are available to the public for programs, events and meetings through the Kingston Recreation Department's reservation system.

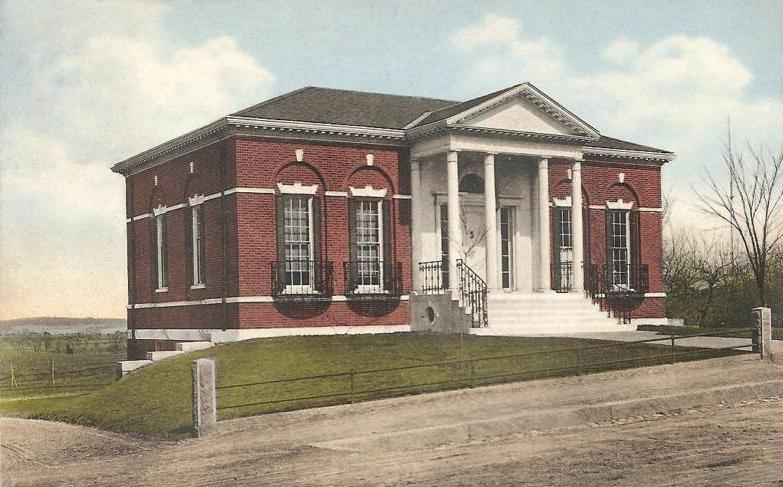
Old postcard view of the building

== See also ==
- National Register of Historic Places listings in Plymouth County, Massachusetts
