= Parson Capen House =

Historic house in Massachusetts, United States

- U.S. National Register of Historic Places
- U.S. National Historic Landmark
- U.S. Historic district – Contributing property
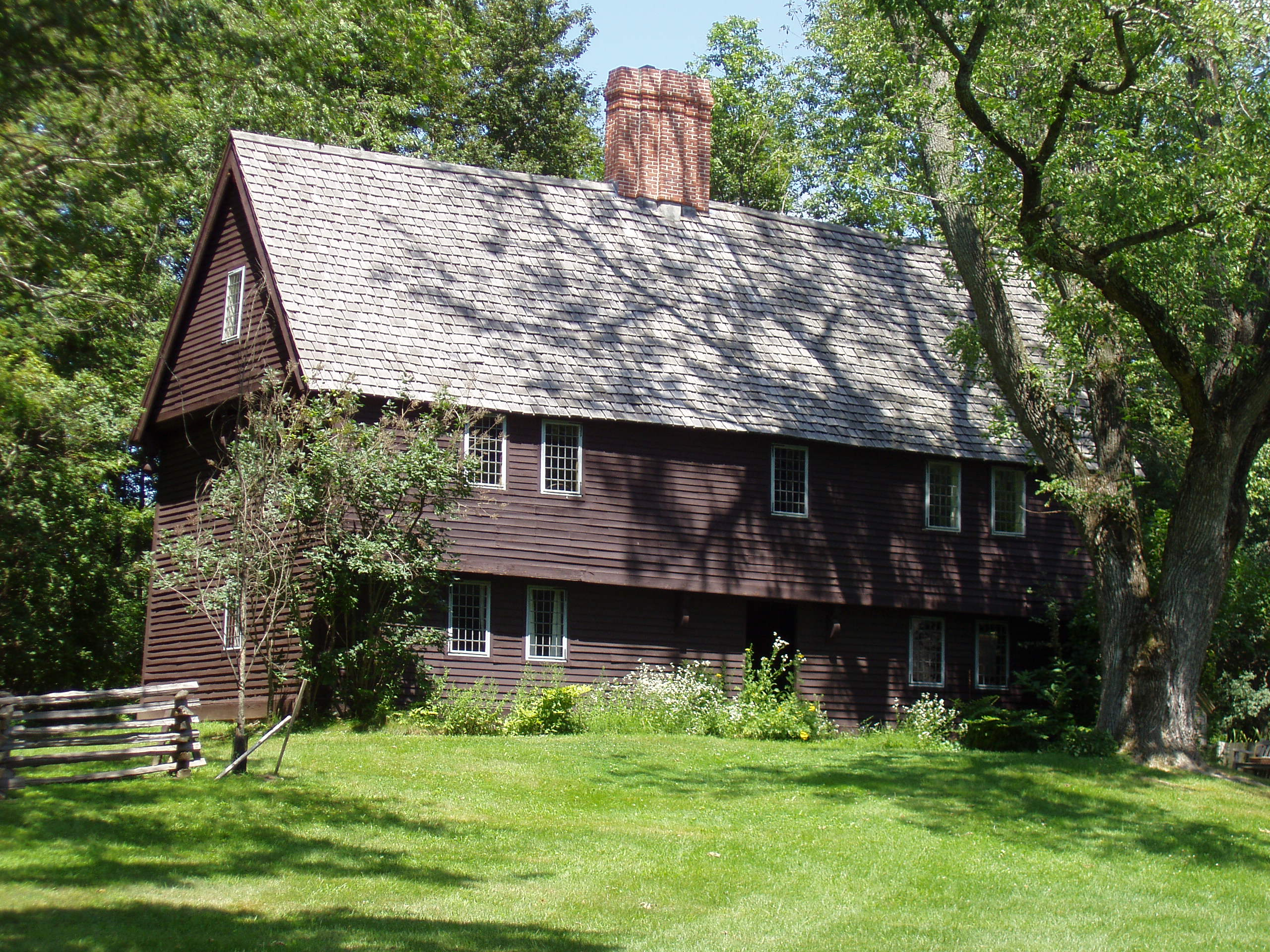
- Parson Capen House

- Location within Massachusetts Location within the United States
- Location: Topsfield, Massachusetts
- Coordinates: 42°38′36″N 70°56′57″W
- Area: 1.1 acres (4,500 m^{2})
- Built: 1694
- Architectural style: Postmedieval English
- Part of: Topsfield Town Common District (ID03001488)
- NRHP reference No.: 66000139

Significant dates
- Added to NRHP: October 15, 1966
- Designated NHL: October 9, 1960
- Designated CP: June 7, 1976

The Parson Capen House is an historic house in Topsfield, Massachusetts, built in 1683. It has drawn attention as an example of early colonial architecture and because of its well-preserved condition by comparison with other contemporaneous houses.

== History ==
The Capen house was built on a 12-acre (49,000 m^{2}) lot in 1683 as the parsonage for the local Congregational Church. It is located at what is now 1 Howlett Street, next to the Topsfield Common. It was first owned by the Reverend Joseph Capen, who had moved to Topsfield from Dorchester. His wife had seen the previous parsonage and was disappointed by its condition. The family lived there for over forty years. At the time that it was built, it was considered to be the best house in the town.

The house was declared a National Historic Landmark in 1960. It is one of the best preserved homes from its period in New England. The Topsfield Historical Society currently operates it as a historic house museum.

== Architecture ==
The Capen house was built with English style architecture, and it bears a strong resemblance to many houses in England.

The house features overhangs called jetties at the front and sides, but not the rear, of the building. Although many have assumed that the overhangs were intended as protection from Native Americans, they were primarily decorative and also served to shield people from rain. The house has a small entrance hallway leading to the staircase. It contains four rooms, each of which contains a fireplace. It has exposed low ceilings with wooden beams.

Hanging wood pendills, ornaments that were carved by the carpenter who built the house, were also used as decoration.

== See also ==
- List of historic houses in Massachusetts
- List of the oldest buildings in Massachusetts
- National Register of Historic Places listings in Essex County, Massachusetts
- List of National Historic Landmarks in Massachusetts

== Bibliography ==
- Griffeth, Bill (2008). By Faith Alone: One Family's Epic Journey Through 400 Years of American Protestantism. Random House. ISBN 978-0-307-33729-0.
