= Topsfield, Massachusetts =

- Town
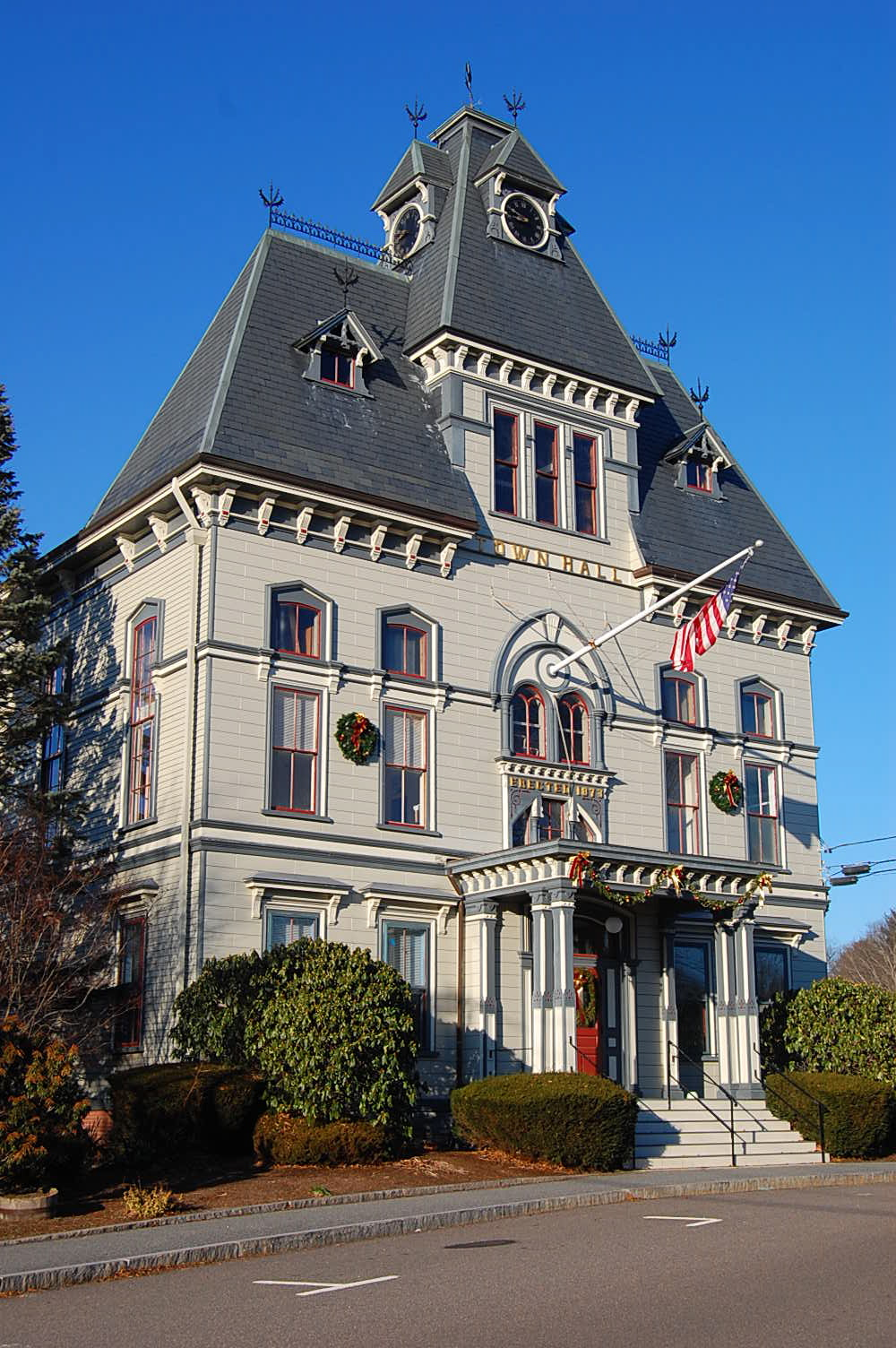
- Topsfield's Town Hall

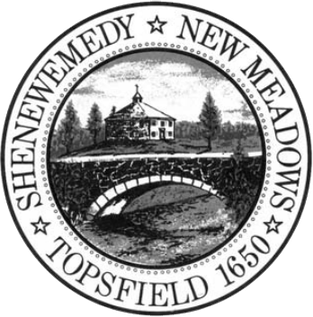
- Seal

- Location in Essex County and the state of Massachusetts.
- Coordinates: 42°38′15″N 70°57′00″W
- Country: United States
- State: Massachusetts
- County: Essex
- Settled: 1635
- Incorporated: 1650

Government
  - Type: Open town meeting

Area
  - Total: 12.8 sq mi (33.2 km^{2})
  - Land: 11.9 sq mi (30.9 km^{2})
  - Water: 0.89 sq mi (2.3 km^{2})
- Elevation: 62 ft (19 m)

Population (2020)
  - Total: 6,569
  - Density: 551/sq mi (213/km^{2})
- Time zone: UTC-5 (Eastern)
  - Summer (DST): UTC-4 (Eastern)
- ZIP code: 01983
- Area code: 351 / 978
- FIPS code: 25-70150
- GNIS feature ID: 0618312
- Website: Topsfield, Massachusetts, Official Web Site

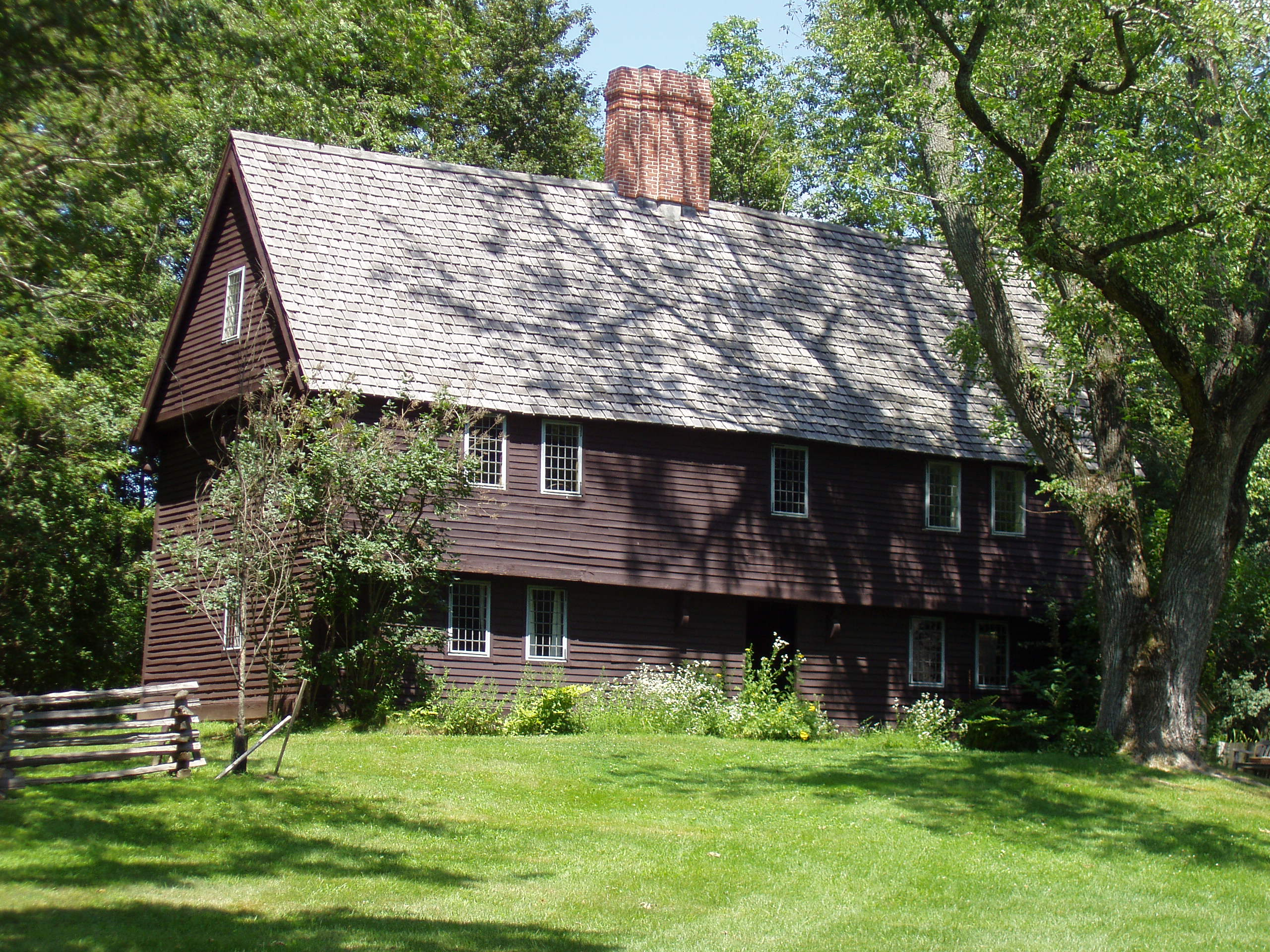
Parson Capen House, built in 1683

Topsfield is a town in Essex County, Massachusetts, United States. The population was 6,569 at the 2020 census. Topsfield is located in the North Shore region of Massachusetts. Part of the town comprises the census-designated place of Topsfield.

== History ==
=== Colonial period ===
The Agawam tribe inhabited Topsfield prior to and during the British colonization in the early seventeenth century. They were one of the Algonquian peoples. They claimed the land north of the Danvers River, the whole of Cape Ann and from there to the Merrimack River. However, the first European explorers had brought smallpox to New England, decimating all the shore tribes from the Penobscot River to Narragansett Bay in 1616.

Chief Masconomet, for whom Masconomet Regional High School is named, was the sagamore or chief of the Agawam at this time. He welcomed Massachusetts Bay Colony Governor John Winthrop on his arrival in Salem Harbor in 1630. Masconomet deeded all the Agawams' land to Winthrop in 1638 in exchange for twenty pounds sterling. The English had settled within the bounds of modern-day Topsfield by 1643. They originally named their settlement New Meadows. Tradition has long held that the Agawam called the place Shenewemedy, meaning "the pleasant place by the flowing waters." More recent historians believe that Shenewemedy was how the Agawam pronounced New Meadows, rather than a word in their own language.

The General Court of Massachusetts renamed the place Topsfield in 1648, undoubtedly after Toppesfield, England, a small parish in the county of Essex north of London. Topsfield was incorporated as a town in 1650. Masconomet died in 1658 and was buried on Sagamore Hill, now in Hamilton. Nine years later, two young men were punished for digging up the grave of the sagamore and carrying his skull on a pole. Native Americans were held in low regard and were poorly treated by the colonists. There is no record of hostilities between the colonists and Native Americans in Topsfield, however, even during the French and Indian Wars, which covered the period 1689–1697. The Topsfield town records last mention Native American residents in 1750.

The Salem witch trials of 1692 touched Topsfield directly. Belief in witches was common in the seventeenth century. People were accused of witchcraft in Europe and the colonies during this time, but executions were relatively rare in the colonies. Historians conclude that not more than 15 people were executed as witches in the American colonies before 1692. In that year alone, however, over 160 people, mostly from Essex County, Massachusetts, were accused of witchcraft. Of these, 19 were hanged and one was pressed to death for refusing to plead. In July 1692, Rebecca Nurse of Salem Village (then part of the town of Salem, now part of present-day Danvers) was hanged at Gallows Hill in Salem. She was the daughter of William Towne of Topsfield. Young Salem Village girls allegedly possessed by the devil—the source of Rebecca Nurse's witchcraft accusation and most others—also named as witches Rebecca's Topsfield sisters, Sarah Cloyce and Mary Esty. While Sarah was eventually set free, Mary was hanged in September. Sarah Wildes and Elizabeth Howe from Topsfield were hanged along with Rebecca Nurse. Many other Topsfield residents were accused of witchcraft until the hysteria ended in May 1693, when the governor of Massachusetts set free all of the remaining persons accused of witchcraft and issued a proclamation of general pardon. While the causes of the 1692 witchcraft episode continue to be the subject of historical and sociological study, there is a consensus view that land disputes and perhaps economic rivalry among factions in Salem, Salem Village and Topsfield fuelled animosity and played an underlying role.

The witchcraft delusion is an extreme example of how religion is alloyed in Topsfield history, but other examples abound. Indeed, Topsfield was founded in part based on "alarming" 1633 news that the Roman Catholic French had planted settlements nearby and intended to send settlers "with divers priests and Jesuits among them". Governor Winthrop and the Puritan establishment (who believed a Protestant theocracy was proper), countered the perceived Catholic threat in March of that year by sending English men and women into the wilderness that would become Topsfield. Among the first group was William Perkins, a preacher. From the beginning, Topsfield residents made provision for "the publicke worship of God". In 1684, they hired the Reverend Joseph Capen, whose Parson Capen House still stands as the town's most notable historical landmark. A successor to Capen's original Congregational church building overlooks the Topsfield common. Its white steeple graces countless postcards. Topsfield's pre-eminent historian, George Francis Dow, recorded: "No minister of those early days left a deeper impression on the town than Reverend Joseph Capen, who wisely led the minds of the people along the varied paths of knowledge until his death in 1725."

No minister in those early days may have left a deeper impression on Topsfield religious history, but it was a contemporary of Reverend Capen whose family has best connected Topsfield to the religious history of the world. Robert Smith settled in Topsfield in 1638. His descendants extended through five generations in Topsfield. They were respected townspeople and members of Capen's Congregational Church. Joseph Smith Sr. was born in Topsfield in 1771, and his son, Joseph Smith Jr., founded the Latter Day Saint movement. The younger Joseph Smith was born in Sharon, Vermont, in 1805, not long after his family moved from Topsfield. Mormons point out Topsfield in their church history books and continue to visit the Smith ancestral hometown today.

=== Revolution and new republic ===
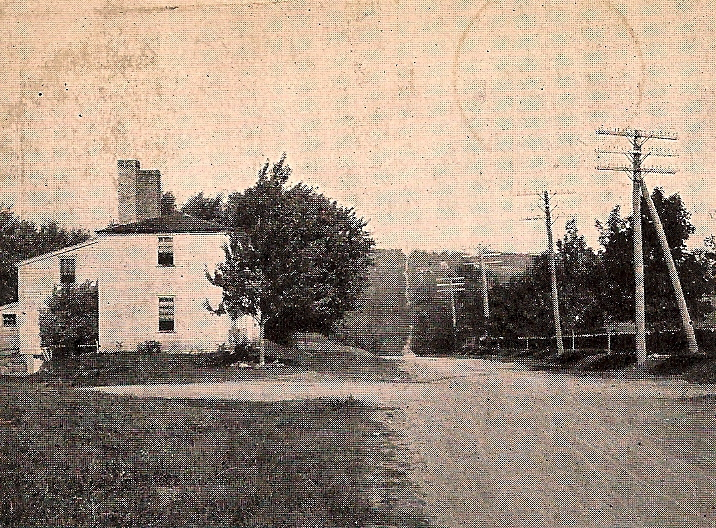
Topsfield Tollhouse along the Newburyport Turnpike

The population of Topsfield grew slowly in the eighteenth century, reaching only 773 by the year 1776. Topsfield was much smaller and more agrarian than other Essex County towns by the time of the Revolution and perhaps for these reasons the town seemed a bit more conservative and less ardent for independence than its Essex County neighbors. Nonetheless, as tensions between crown and colonists mounted in the years before the American Revolution, Topsfield joined the network of committees dedicated to preserving the rights of the people. On June 8, 1771, the town voted to stand ready "to preserve and Defend Our Own Lawfull Rights Libertys and propertys even to the last Extremity". Topsfield sent two militia companies numbering 110 "Minute Men" under the command of Capt. Joseph Gould, to answer the Lexington Alarm on April 19, 1775. As Dow tells us, "The news from Lexington, spreading like wildfire in every direction, reached this place at about ten o'clock in the forenoon. The farmers were busy in their fields, but there was no hesitation. The plough was stayed mid-furrow, and within an hour, many were on their way to the scene of the conflict." Topsfield men participated in the Battle of Bunker Hill on June 17, 1775, and were part of General Washington's Continental army throughout the remainder of the American Revolutionary War.

Advances in communication, transportation and commerce in the nineteenth century wove Topsfield ever more tightly into the fabric of the new republic. In 1803, Governor Caleb Strong chartered the Newburyport Turnpike Corporation, a profit-making venture that proposed building a toll road straight from Newburyport through Topsfield to Boston. Proponents of the turnpike claimed it would be a far more efficient way between the two endpoints, cutting travel time from six to four hours. Work on the Turnpike began in August 1803 and involved immense amounts of manual and animal labor. When the Newburyport Turnpike opened for business on February 11, 1805, its builders claimed it was the best in the nation. The turnpike had tollhouses located in Newbury, Topsfield and Chelsea, each with a large gate that swung open and closed across the way. Stagecoaches ran regularly carrying passengers, mail and freight, though not without difficulty over Topsfield's steep hills. Accidents were common. The Newburyport Turnpike Corporation was never particularly profitable and became less so with the advent of the railroad. The corporation ceased operations around 1847 and sold the turnpike to Essex County in the early 1850s.

Topsfield was one of the towns surrounded by the original "Gerrymander"—meandering electoral districts drawn by Governor Elbridge Gerry in 1812 to further the interests of his political party.

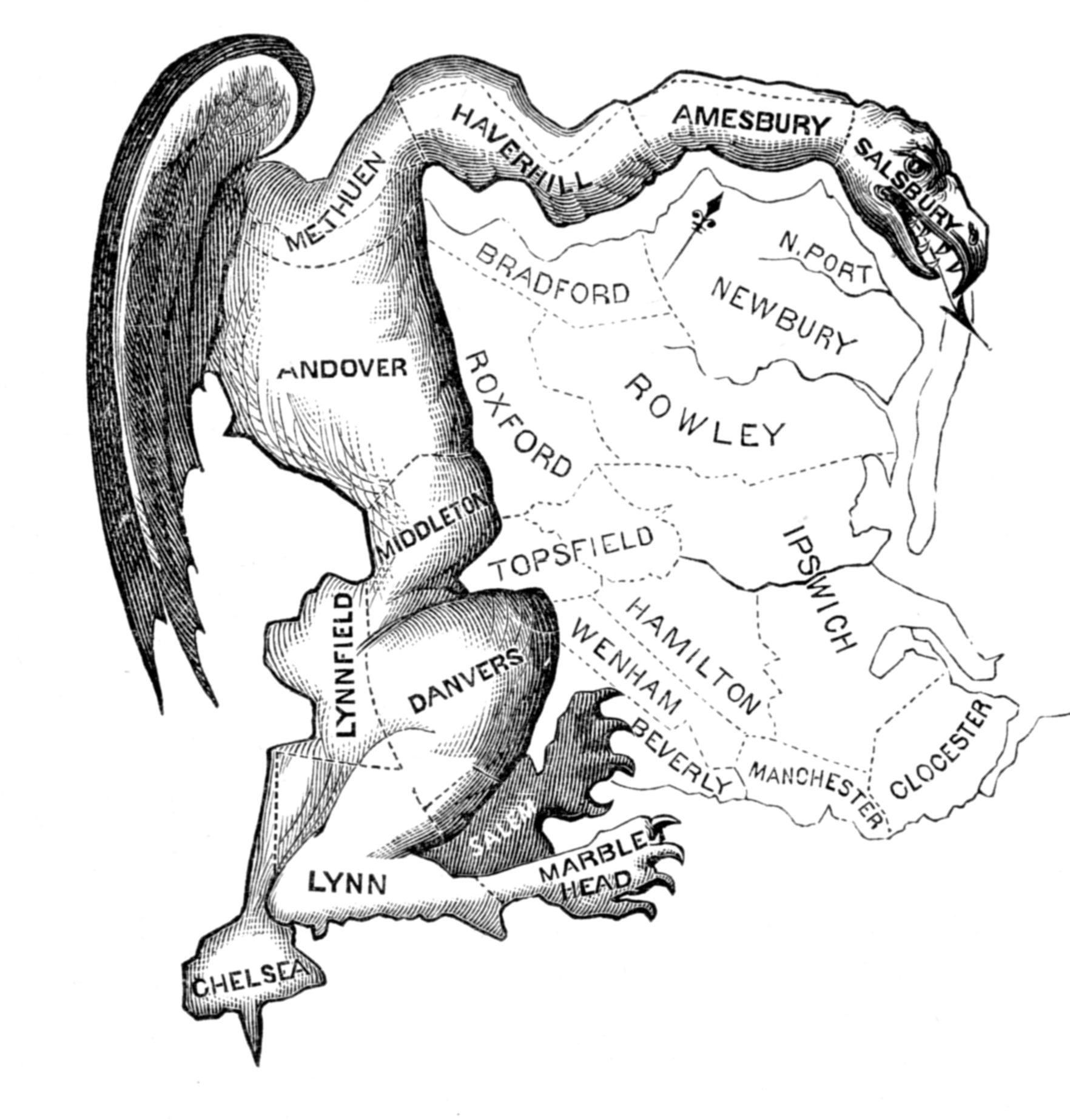
First printed in March 1812, this political cartoon was drawn in reaction to the state senate electoral districts drawn by the Massachusetts legislature to favor the Democratic-Republican party candidates of Governor Elbridge Gerry over the Federalists. The caricature satirizes the bizarre shape of a district in Essex County, Massachusetts as a dragon. Federalist's newspapers editors and others at the time likened the district shape to a salamander, and one Federalist leader undoubtedly said, rather than describe it as salamander "call it a gerrymander, after Governor Gerry." Hence the word was invented.

=== Nineteenth and early twentieth century: railroad, Civil War, shoes and immigration ===
In the middle of the nineteenth century, entrepreneurs in New England started small railroad companies. John Wright and Asa Pingree were among the Topsfield men who chartered the Danvers and Georgetown Railroad in 1851, with plans to run a rail line between those two towns through Topsfield. Railroad cars entered Topsfield for the first time on August 12, 1854. When the line was open for public travel on October 23, the Boston Transcript wrote, "It was a great day for the hardworking citizens of several towns of Essex County when a new route between Boston and Newburyport was opened to the public. We understand a large number of persons from Georgetown, Boxford and Topsfield, who had never travelled with a steam horse, ventured the experiment of jumping on and trying him." The Topsfield station was first on Main Street and moved to a new location on Park Street in 1897. Railroad mergers and other unions were common at this time. By 1905, a number of the local lines—the Danvers and Georgetown, the Danvers Railroad, the Newburyport Railroad and the Eastern Railroad (Massachusetts) among them—were effectively made part of the Boston and Maine Railroad.

The news of the firing on Fort Sumter on April 12, 1861, reached Topsfield about five o'clock that afternoon. Topsfield sent 113 soldiers to the American Civil War and appropriated funds for recruiting and supporting them. Dow adds, "The ladies of Topsfield worked heartily in the cause of the soldiers during the war, and forwarded to the army, money, clothing and hospital stores". The Topsfield soldiers—many of whom may never before have "travelled with a steam horse" or left town at all—fought and died in places far from home: Bull Run, Virginia; Gettysburg, Pennsylvania; and Port Hudson, Louisiana, to name just a few. Several men of Topsfield died as prisoners in the Confederates' notorious Andersonville Prison in Georgia. In 1860, Topsfield had a population of 1,292, but in 1865 that number had fallen to 1,212. In his will, Dr. Justin Allen left money to the town to erect a monument to honor Topsfield soldiers of the Civil War. Alphonso T. Merrill's design, called "The wounded color Sergeant", is a prominent landmark on the Topsfield Common, dedicated in 1914.

Up to and through the 19th century, Topsfield was principally an agrarian town, but one industry—the manufacture of shoes—flourished for a while in Topsfield, as it did at this time across New England. The town records mention the first shoe maker in 1838. The industry picked up in Topsfield during the Civil War, as sewn shoes were beginning to supersede pegged ones, and many Essex County firms supplied shoes to the Union troops. In 1867, four shoe manufacturing firms were located in town. The two principal manufacturers were those of Charles Herrick (the larger, founded 1837) and John Bailey. Topsfield shoes found customers across the United States, and it was said that, at its highest point of production, Topsfield shipped 200,000 pairs annually. The shoe business in Topsfield declined after the Civil War. The Herrick family, the last manufacturer in town, ceased operations in the early 20th century.

During the time of the Great Famine of Ireland, a wave of Irish immigrants came to America, arriving in Topsfield in the 1850s to work constructing the railroad. Dow tells us, "The Irishmen employed in the making of the roadbed were brought into Topsfield in 50 tipcarts, just at the edge of the evening [after the work day was over]." The Irish workers slept in town and later occupied shanties located above the railroad bridge, which crosses West Street. The first known Catholic families moved to Topsfield during this time. Italian immigrants arrived in the wave of immigration, mostly from eastern and southern Europe, which occurred from 1890 to 1920. They worked constructing the great estates and summerhouses in Essex County. On the estate of Thomas E. Proctor, now owned by the Massachusetts Audubon Society (the Ipswich River Wildlife Sanctuary), Italian immigrant stonemasons constructed the "Rockery"—a lavish rock garden and series of caverns—which still exists. They lived in shanties during the construction. Historians believe that Topsfield's first Italian families are descended from these masons.

=== Modern period: technological advances, automobiles, Route 128 and suburbia ===
The turnpike and railroad were important technological advances affecting Topsfield history in the early and middle 19th century, but the pace of technological change picked up dramatically as that century came to a close. The 1870s and 1880s saw the invention of three technologies that we take for granted today, but were revolutionary in their day: the electric light bulb, the telephone and centrally-generated electricity generation. All three were available to Topsfield residents by the 1890s and boomed after the start of the 20th century. These technologies, like the turnpike and railroad before them, integrated the town of Topsfield ever more closely into the county, the state, the nation and the world.

The automobile, however, affected Topsfield more than any other technology by allowing its residents to disconnect where they lived from where they worked. Automobiles need roads, of course, and the quality and quantity of road-building accelerated during the twentieth century. Massachusetts Route 128, with Boston at its center, quietly but powerfully influenced Topsfield's history and character. Originally known as the "Circumferential Highway", Route 128 was the first limited-access beltway in the United States. The Route 128 number dates from the origin of the Massachusetts highway system in the 1920s. By the 1950s, Route 128 ran from Nantasket Beach in Hull to Gloucester. With the rapid growth of high-technology industry in the suburban areas along Route 128, the highway came to symbolize the Boston high-tech community itself. In 1955, Business Week magazine ran an article titled "New England Highway Upsets Old Way of Life" and referred to Route 128 as "the Magic Semicircle". The number of companies grew rapidly from that point in time, many of them involved with Space Race and Cold War defense projects. In the 1980s, the positive effects of this growth on the Massachusetts economy were dubbed the "Massachusetts Miracle". Throughout this period of expansion, employees of the Route 128 companies made Topsfield their home.

For its first three hundred years, Topsfield was a small farm town. But each year from its colonial period Topsfield has grown more closely connected to the larger world. More than anything else, affordable automobiles and modern road systems changed Topsfield and made the town what it is today—a suburban bedroom community within the greater Boston metropolitan area.

== Geography and transportation ==
According to the United States Census Bureau, Topsfield has a total area of 12.8 square miles (33.2 km^{2}), of which 11.9 square miles (30.9 km^{2}) are land and 0.89 square miles (2.3 km^{2}), or 7.00%, is water. Topsfield lies in the geographic center of Essex County, Massachusetts. Like its namesake in Essex, England, Topsfield has within its bounds some of the higher land in the county. The highest point in town is found on Great Hill, with an elevation of at least 245 feet (75 m), according to the most recent (2011–2012) USGS 7.5-minute topographical map. Hood's Pond, covering an area of 68 acres (28 ha) in the northern part of town, is the largest body of water in Topsfield, though most of it lies in Ipswich. Topsfield also includes parts of the Ipswich River Wildlife Sanctuary, Bradley Palmer State Park, Willowdale State Forest and the entirety of the Topsfield Town Forest.

Clockwise from the north, Topsfield is bounded by Ipswich, Hamilton, Wenham, Danvers, Middleton and Boxford. Topsfield is located approximately 10 miles (16 km) north of Salem and 22 miles (35 km) north of Boston. Part of the North Shore in name, if not in actuality, Topsfield is 12 miles (19 km) south of the Merrimack River and 8 miles (13 km) from Massachusetts Bay and the Atlantic Ocean. Interstate 95 passes through the southwestern corner of town, with exits in neighboring Danvers and Boxford. The town is nearly bisected from southwest to northeast by U.S. Route 1, known locally as the "Newburyport Turnpike" or "Old Boston Road". From northwest to southeast, Massachusetts Route 97 also crosses through town. (A few yards of Route 35 enter the town as well, before terminating at Route 97.) The now-abandoned Boston and Maine Railroad line passes through town; the town lies west of the Newburyport/Rockport Line of the MBTA Commuter Rail. The nearest airport is the Beverly Municipal Airport, with the nearest national and international air service at Boston's Logan International Airport.

== Demographics ==
Historical population
| Year | Pop. | ±% |
|---|---|---|
| 1790 | 780 | — |
| 1850 | 1,170 | +50.0% |
| 1860 | 1,292 | +10.4% |
| 1870 | 1,213 | −6.1% |
| 1880 | 1,165 | −4.0% |
| 1890 | 1,022 | −12.3% |
| 1900 | 1,030 | +0.8% |
| 1910 | 1,174 | +14.0% |
| 1920 | 900 | −23.3% |
| 1930 | 986 | +9.6% |
| 1940 | 1,150 | +16.6% |
| 1950 | 1,412 | +22.8% |
| 1960 | 3,351 | +137.3% |
| 1970 | 5,225 | +55.9% |
| 1980 | 5,709 | +9.3% |
| 1990 | 5,754 | +0.8% |
| 2000 | 6,141 | +6.7% |
| 2010 | 6,085 | −0.9% |
| 2020 | 6,569 | +8.0% |
| 2022* | 6,504 | −1.0% |
* = population estimate. Source: United States census records and Population Estimates Program data.

At the 2000 census, there were 6,141 people, 2,099 households and 1,712 families residing in the town. The population density was 482.1 inhabitants per square mile (186.1/km^{2}). There were 2,144 housing units at an average density of 65.0 persons/km^{2} (168.3 persons/sq mi). The racial makeup of the town was 97.8% White, 0.4% African American, 0.03% Native American, 0.85% Asian, 0.00% Pacific Islander, 0.34% from other races, and 0.65% from two or more races. 0.83% of the population were Hispanic or Latino of any race.

There were 2,099 households, of which 40.2% had children under the age of 18 living with them, 73.7% were married couples living together, 6.1% have a woman whose husband does not live with her, and 18.4% were non-families. 16.0% of all households were made up of individuals, and 9.2% had someone living alone who was 65 years of age or older. The average household size was 2.87 and the average family size was 3.22.

Age distribution was 28.2% under the age of 18, 4.6% from 18 to 24, 24.7% from 25 to 44, 27.0% from 45 to 64, and 15.4% who were 65 years of age or older. The median age was 41 years. For every 100 females, there were 94.2 males. For every 100 females age 18 and over, there were 90.3 males.

The median household income was $96,430, and the median family income was $104,475. Males had a median income of $67,428 versus $43,780 for females. The per capita income for the town was $37,770 1.7% of the population and 0.4% of families were below the poverty line. Out of the total people living in poverty, 0.0% are under the age of 18 and 4.1% are 65 or older.

== Government ==
=== Topsfield town government ===
Topsfield is governed by an Open Town Meeting and an elected five-member Select Board who appoint the Town Administrator Kevin Harutunian. One or two members of the Select Board are elected each year to serve for three years. The current members are Chair Marshall Hook, Vice Chair Rafael MacDonald, Boyd Jackson, Michelle Mercier Link, and Robert Kmetz.

The Select Board has evolved through more than three hundred years of tradition and custom. In addition to those duties determined by Massachusetts General Law and established by custom, the Select Board Members' powers and duties are determined by state law and the Town's bylaws.

Since 2009, following a vote of Town Meeting to update the Town's General By-Laws, the Select Board have appointed a Town Administrator as serve as an agent of the Board and to oversee day-to-day operations and the delivery of Town Services provided under the legal authority of the Board of Selectmen. The first Town Administrator was Virginia Wilder (2009–2013). The second Town Administrator, Kellie A. Hebert was appointed in September 2013. The Board provides general supervision over Town matters not specifically delegated by law or voted to another officer or board.

The Select Board generally meet every other Monday night in the Town Hall. All meetings are posted and are open to the public. Regular business meetings are televised and may be viewed on Channel 10/47, the Community Channel. Select Board meetings, like those of all public boards and committees, must be posted at least 48 hours in advance. The meetings are open to the public and subject to the requirements of the state's Open Meeting Law: Massachusetts General Laws Chapter 39, Section 23B. The Board may retire to executive session only to discuss those matters permitted by law. The Board must state which of the eight provisions is being invoked at that time. All minutes are a matter of public record except when they need to remain secret long enough to protect the legal purposes of the session.

=== State government ===
Topsfield is part of the Second Essex state senate district represented by State Senator Bruce Tarr, and the Fourth Essex state congressional district, held by Representative Sally Kerans.

=== Federal government ===
Topsfield is part of the Sixth Congressional District of Massachusetts. The seat is currently held by Representative Seth Moulton (D- Salem).

== Education ==
Topsfield has two public elementary schools: Steward School located on Perkins Row, serving preschool through third grade; and Proctor Elementary School located in downtown Topsfield, serving fourth through sixth grade. In the 1970s, each of these schools had all the elementary grades and students attended from different parts of town. Masconomet Regional Middle School and Masconomet Regional High School, situated together in Boxford (although they sport Topsfield mailing addresses), serve seventh through eighth grade and ninth through twelfth grade, respectively. Both the high school and middle school enroll students from Boxford and Middleton. In athletics, Masconomet is part of the Northeastern Conference.

== Tourism ==
=== Topsfield Fair ===
Topsfield is home of the Topsfield Fair, which attracted almost 500,000 visitors in 2008. The fair, one of the oldest of its type in the US, was started in 1818 by the recently formed Essex Agricultural Society. The first annual fair was a cattle show held by the society on October 5, 1818. The president of the society, Timothy Pickering, was awarded a first-place prize for the "superior performance of his plow." The Topsfield Fair ran every year following that first show, with the exception of three years during the Civil War, three years during World War II, and in 2020 during the COVID-19 pandemic. The fair today features carnival rides, games and concert events in addition to the more traditional attractions, such as exhibitions of livestock, rabbits and cavies, crafts, horses and produce. The fair also hosts the All New England Giant Pumpkin Weigh-Off. The current record-holding pumpkin was entered in 2022 and weighed 2,480 pounds. The fairgrounds are used for various activities during the year including horse shows, mineral shows, indoor soccer, indoor lacrosse, concerts, and other forms of recreation. The grounds are located along Boston Street, adjacent to the Ipswich River. Five separate lots surrounding the grounds provide parking, and are lettered A-E during fair time. These lots are also regularly used for recreation during non-fair times. Satellite parking during peak hours of the fair can be found at Masconomet Regional High School, with busses regularly bringing people back and forth from the lot. The Topsfield Fair always runs for 11 days, between the last weekend in September and Columbus Day. The Fair is held in October and the weather is normally clear and it is a family fun time for kids of all ages.

=== Smith Family Homestead ===
Located approximately 2 miles (3.2 km) from downtown Topsfield, the Smith Family Homestead was home to five generations of the Smith family who are ascendants of the Prophet Joseph Smith, an important figure in the Latter-day Saint movement. Four members of the prophet's family lived in the house, dating as far back as 1693. Robert Smith, the first in the family to live in Topsfield, came to America and purchased 208 acres of land located in both Topsfield and the nearby township of Boxford. Samuel Smith (I) built what would become known as the Smith Family Homestead following his father's death, while becoming a prominent figure in the area. His son, Samuel Smith (II) also influenced local politics and was heavily involved in the First Provincial Congress in Concord in both 1774 and 1775. Following the death of Samuel Smith (II) in 1785, Asael Smith, grandfather of Prophet Joseph Smith, took control of the homestead. In 1771, Asael Smith's wife Mary gave birth to Joseph Smith Sr, the father of prophet Joseph Smith. In 1875, the house originally built on the property was replaced by a more modern estate. In October 2005, a marker was placed in front of the house by the Mormon Historic Sites Foundation and the Topsfield Historical Society commemorating the lives of the Smith family and the presence they previously had on the property. The house is privately owned and not open for tours, but large groups are regularly seen visiting the property and commemorating the prominent figures of the Latter-day Saint society.

== Annual events ==
Topsfield residents have traditionally celebrated Memorial Day with a parade through the center of town to honor Topsfield's living veterans and those who have died in service of the county. Topsfield residents served in the Revolutionary War, the Civil War, the Spanish–American War and all of the wars of the twentieth century. A memorial to Topsfield's veterans is common.

The Topsfield Historical Society's Strawberry Festival is celebrated in early June. Bowls of fresh strawberries, whipped cream, and shortcakes are served by volunteer members to the attendees. Local groups such as the Garden Clubs, the Friends of the Library, and the Newcomers Club, among others, attend this event to explain their activities and invite new members.

On August 22, 2024, the Topsfield Pirates defeated the Blue Jays 7–6 to win the Men's Softball Title ending an 18-year drought.

== Notable people ==
- Abbey D'Agostino, Olympic athlete
- Lily Fitts, singer
- Donna Murphy, stage and film actress
- Bradley Palmer, lawyer and businessman
- Ryan Serhant, realtor and actor
- Ollie Silva, racing driver
- Joseph Smith Sr., father of LDS Church founder Joseph Smith

== Points of interest ==
- Topsfield Fair
- Coolidge Estate
- Ipswich River Wildlife Sanctuary
- Parson Capen House

== Bibliography ==
- Dow, George Francis (1940). History of Topsfield, Massachusetts (First ed.). The Topsfield Historical Society.
- Dinan, E.; Dinan, J. (1999). Images of America: Topsfield. Charleston: Arcadia Publishing.
- Tagney, R. (1989). The World Turned Upside Down: Essex County During America's Turbulent Years, 1763–1790. West Newbury: Essex County History.
