= Willowdale =

Willowdale may refer to:

== Communities ==
=== Canada ===
Alphabetically by province

- Willowdale Estates, Alberta, a locality
- Willowdale, Halifax, Nova Scotia, a subdivision
- Willowdale, Pictou, Nova Scotia, a community
- Willowdale, Toronto, Ontario, a neighborhood
  - Willowdale (federal electoral district), federal riding in Toronto, Ontario, Canada
  - Willowdale (provincial electoral district), provincial riding in Toronto, Ontario, Canada
  - Ward 18 Willowdale, municipal ward in Toronto, Ontario, Canada
- Rural Municipality of Willowdale No. 153, Saskatchewan

=== United States ===
Alphabetically by state

- Willowdale, Kansas, an unincorporated community in Kingman County
- Willowdale Township, Dickinson County, Kansas, a township
- Willowdale Township, Holt County, Nebraska, a township
- Willowdale Settlement, New Hampshire, a former village; see List of New Hampshire historical markers (176–200) § 185
- Willowdale, New Jersey, a neighborhood in Cherry Hill
- Willowdale, Pennsylvania, an unincorporated community
- Willowdale, West Virginia, an unincorporated community

== Historic buildings ==
- Willowdale (Painter, Virginia), added to the National Register of Historic Places in 2007
- Willowdale Estate, in Topsfield, Massachusetts

== Other uses ==
- Willowdale Airfield, in Toronto, Ontario, Canada
- Willowdale Elementary School, in Omaha, Nebraska, U.S.

== See also ==
- Willow Vale (disambiguation)
