= Willowdale, Nova Scotia =

Willowdale, Nova Scotia could be the following places in Nova Scotia:

- Willowdale, Halifax, Nova Scotia
- Willowdale, Pictou, Nova Scotia
