= Ellen Webster Palmer =

Early advocate for child labor laws

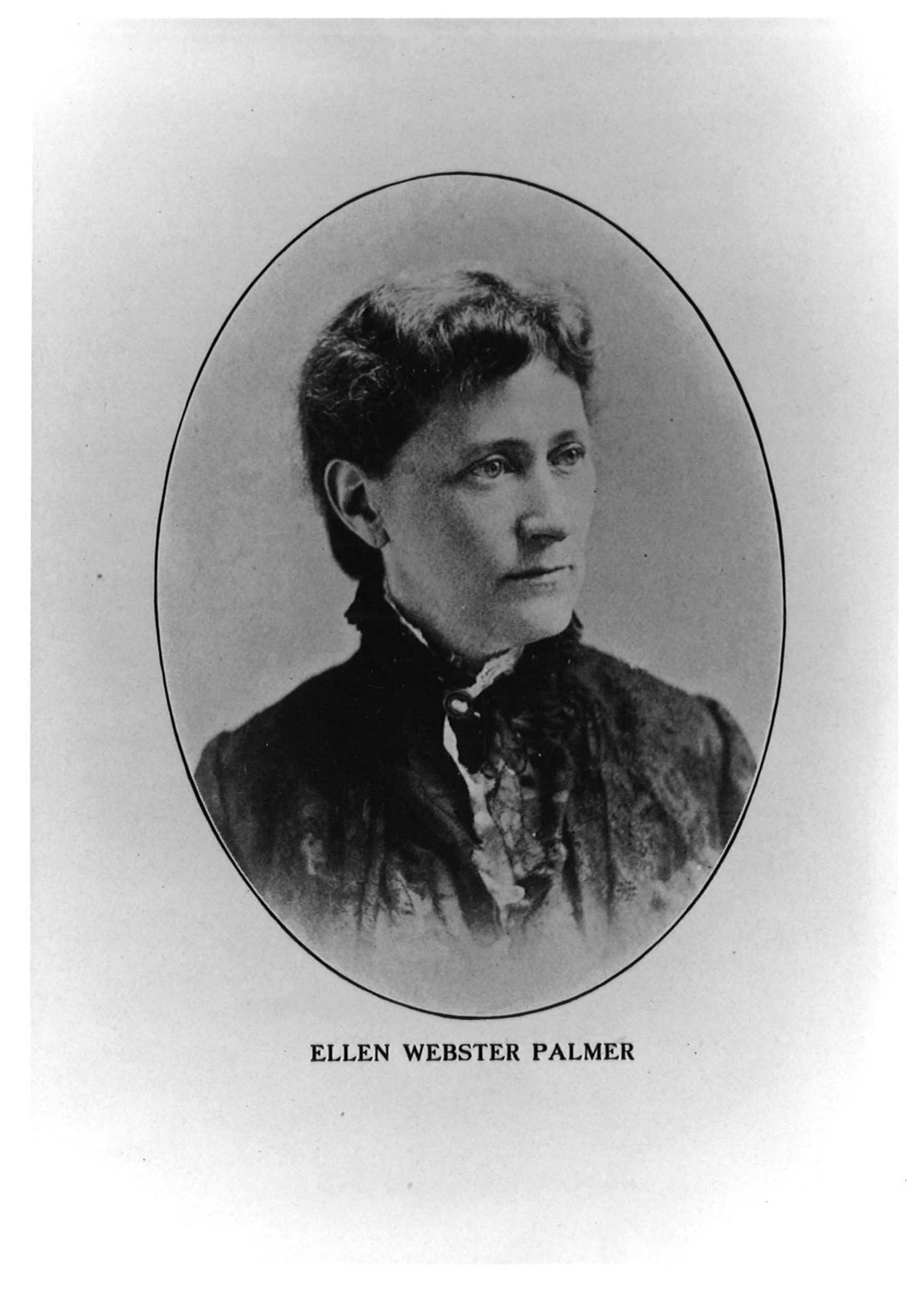
- Born: Ellen Mary Webster

Ellen Webster Palmer (October 20, 1839 - May 1918) was an early advocate for breaker boys and child labor laws.

== Early life ==
Palmer was born in 1839 in Plattsburg, New York. She later moved to Wilkes-Barre, Pennsylvania where she became an elementary school teacher. She married Henry Wilbur Palmer in 1861 and together they had eight children. They had three daughters, Lousie May, Helen Constance, and Madeline. Both of their sons, Bradley Palmer and Henry, were lawyers. Three of their children died before 1885.

== Work ==
Palmer was known for her work with breaker boys, young boys who ranged in age from 6-9 years old. For six days a week these boys worked 10-12 hour shifts down in the coal mines. At this time, there were not child labor laws that were enforced to protect the breaker boys. Palmer helped found the Boys Industrial Association in 1891, and by 1899 they had their own building on town land. At the school the boys were taught mathematics, reading, and writing. In the summers, she took the breaker boys to Lake Nuangola in the summers. Palmer was helped by Mary Trescott, a lawyer that worked in Wilkes-Barre. She worked as a secretary for the BIA and helped Palmer expand and move the BIA to a larger building.

Palmer also increased public knowledge of the conditions faced by the young boys, and in 1903 a state law was passed banning the employment of young children in the mines.

In 1921 a statue to remember Ellen Webster Palmer was created and was located by the Susquehanna River in Wilkes-Barre. When the statue was put up, hundreds of the alumni of the Boys Industrial Association school attended the ceremony.
