= The Exonian =

Newspaper of Phillips Exeter Academy

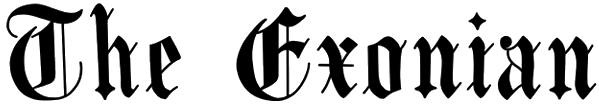
- Type: Student newspaper
- Format: Broadsheet
- School: Phillips Exeter Academy
- Editor-in-chief: Andrew Yang
- Founded: April 6, 1878; 148 years ago
- Headquarters: Exeter, New Hampshire
- Website: theexonian.net

The Exonian is the weekly student-run newspaper of Phillips Exeter Academy in Exeter, New Hampshire. It has been printed continuously since April 6, 1878, making it the oldest continuously-published preparatory school newspaper in the country. It is published every Thursday by its student board and is subject to limited faculty censorship. Many parents and alumni hold subscriptions to the paper, which acts as a forum for the ideas of the Exeter community and prints extensive news, investigative, opinion, sports, and feature articles. In 2011, the newspaper became available to all students free of cost.

== History ==
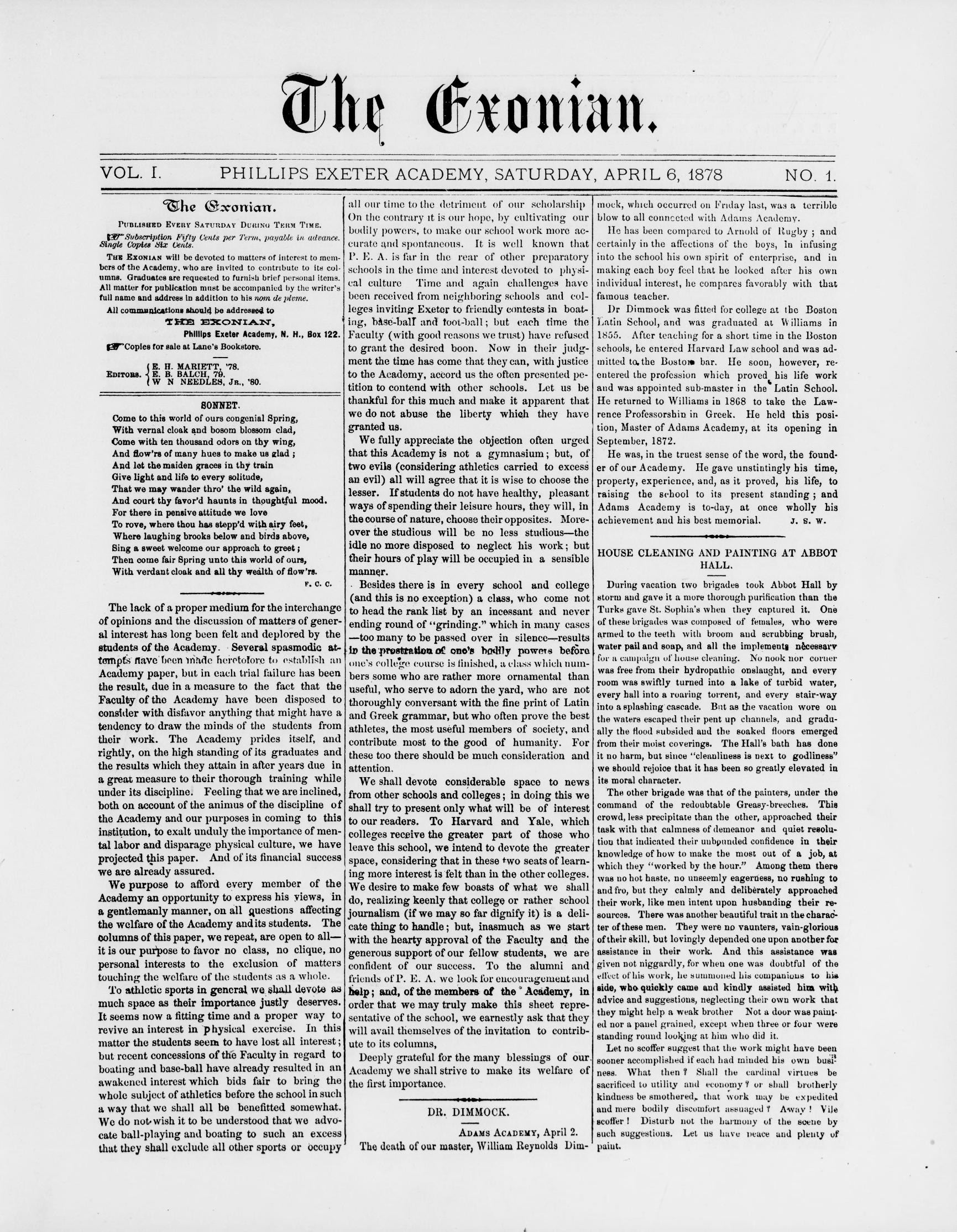
The first issue of The Exonian was published on April 6, 1878.

The paper was begun as a weekly in 1878, when three Exeter students, two of whom were roommates in Abbot Hall, decided to publish a newspaper for the academy. The first issue appeared on Saturday, April 6, of that year.

== Operations ==
The Exonian has been published online since 2010.

The Exonian consists of three boards: an executive board, an upper board and a lower board. These three boards exist for all three branches of The Exonian. The executive board of The Exonian is directed by the editor-in-chief and typically includes a managing editor, director of writing, chief digital editor and business board chair.

The editorial board's upper board is charged with producing all of the paper's content. The editorial board assigns and edits articles, designs the paper and manages visuals, including photography and graphics. The lower board, composed of staff writers, writes the content in the paper. Typically, staff writers are underclassmen, while the upper board is composed of upperclassmen.

The business board's upper board conducts all advertising, operations subscriptions, accounting and outreach. The business board's lower board, composed of associates, works within the aforementioned branches. Similarly to the editorial board, upperclassmen typically make up the upper board, whereas underclassmen typically make up the lower board.

The web board's upper board controls all aspects of The Exonian's web presence. They are in charge of all long-term projects and the appearance of the website.

== Notable alumni ==
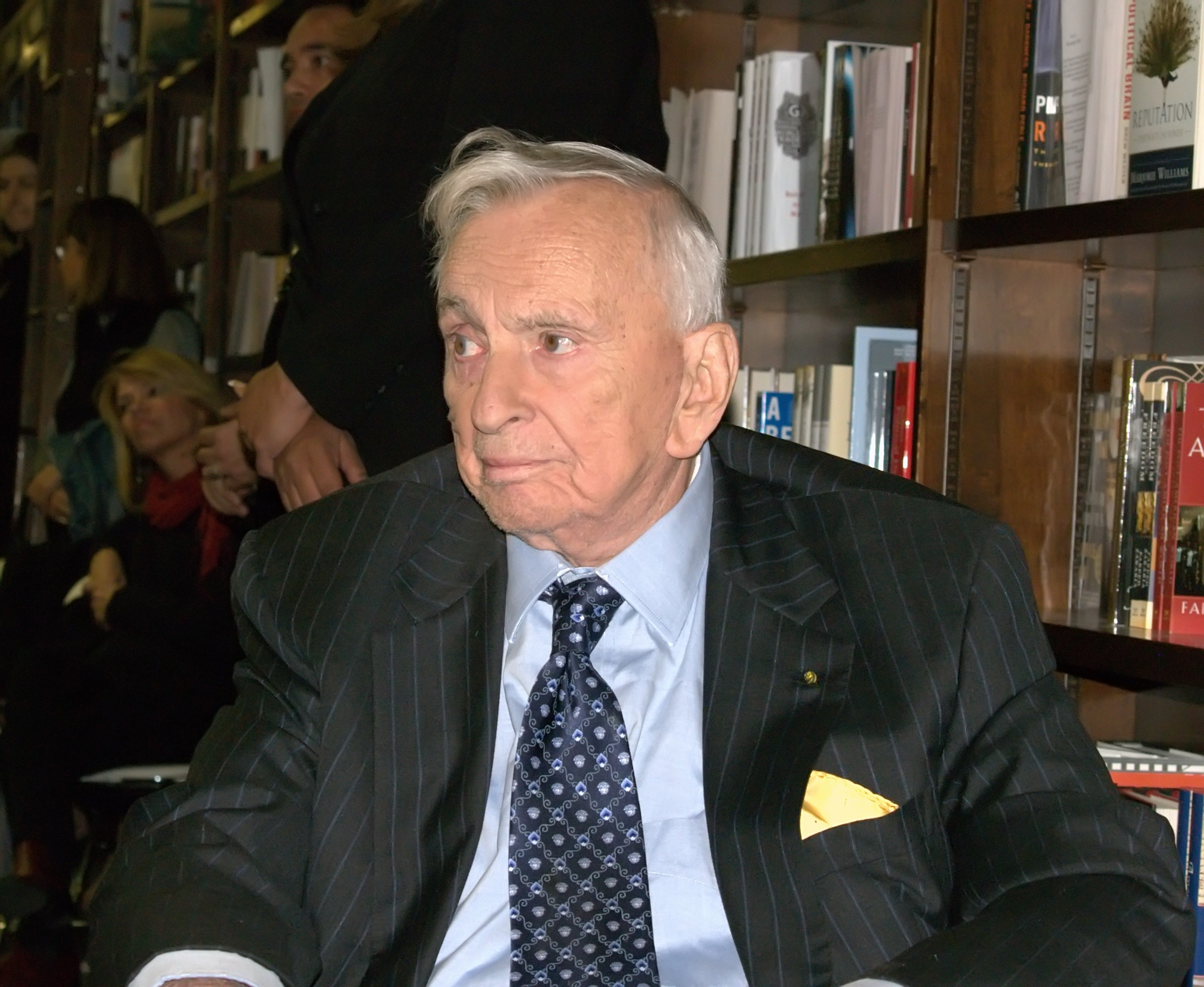
Gore Vidal

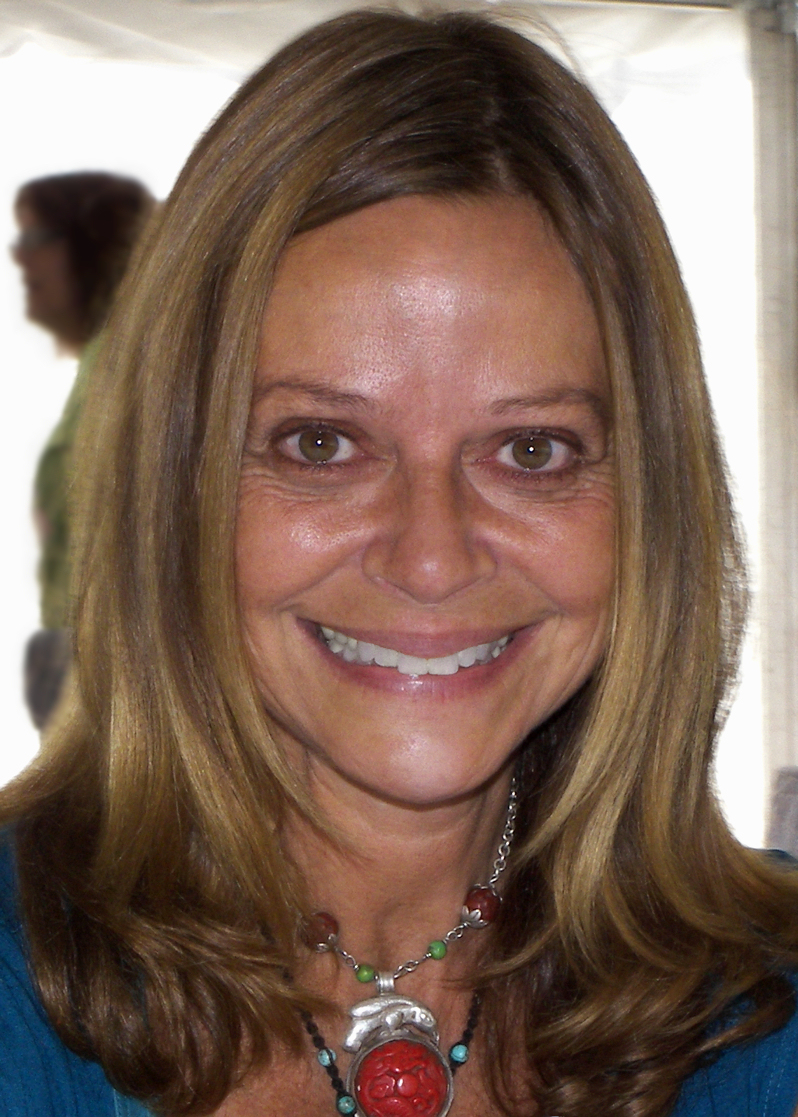
Joyce Maynard

- Whitney Balliett (1944) – jazz critic
- Alex Beam (1971) – journalist
- Roscoe Conkling Bruce (1898) — educator
- David Folkenflik (1987) – journalist
- Laurie Hays (1975) – Pulitzer Prize-winning journalist
- Corliss Lamont (1920) — socialist philosopher
- Ned Lamont (1972) – businessman, 2006 Democratic nominee for Connecticut senator, governor of Connecticut (2019–present)
- Dwight Macdonald (1924) – essayist and philosopher
- Joyce Maynard (1971) – writer
- Bradley Palmer (1884) – lawyer, helped found the United Fruit Company, Gillette, and ITT
- George Plimpton (1944) – journalist, writer, and actor
- Arthur Schlesinger Jr. (1933) – historian
- Donald Ogden Stewart (1912) – author and screenwriter, member of the Algonquin Round Table
- George W. S. Trow (1961) – author and essayist
- Gore Vidal (1943) – author
- Greg Daniels (1980) – TV producer and screenwriter

== Honors and awards ==
- 2002 Columbia Scholastic Press Association Gold Circle Award
  - Advertising & Advertising Photography (1st place)
  - Sports Page Design – Full Color (2nd place)
  - Sports News (3rd place)
- 2005 Columbia Scholastic Press Association Gold Circle Award
  - Page One Design, Color (1st place)
- 2007 National Scholastic Press Association Newspaper Pacemaker Awards
- 2018 Youth Journalism International Courage in Journalism Award

== In popular culture ==
The newspaper The Grave at the fictional Gravesend Academy from A Prayer for Owen Meany is based on The Exonian.
