= Willow Vale =

Willow Vale or Willowvale may refer to:

- Willow Vale, New South Wales (Kiama), Australia
- Willow Vale, New South Wales (Wingecarribee), Australia
- Willow Vale, Queensland, Australia
- Willow Vale Township, Bottineau County, North Dakota, United States
- Willowvale, Queensland, Australia
- Willowvale, South Africa
- Willowvale, Harare, Zimbabwe

== See also ==
- Willowdale (disambiguation)
