= Mary Luella Trescott =

American lawyer (1861–1935)

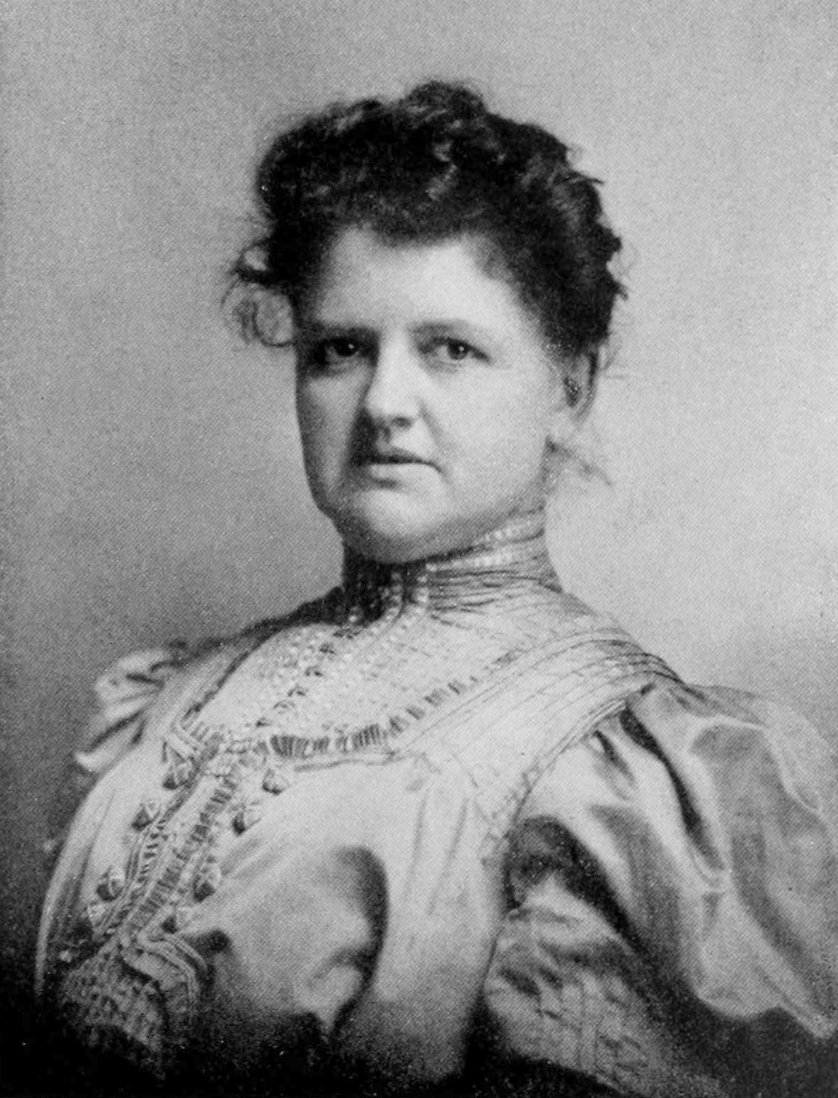
- Born: 1861; Huntington Township, Pennsylvania
- Died: April 24, 1935 (aged 73–74); Danville, Pennsylvania
- Education: Eastman Business College
- Occupation: Lawyer

Signature
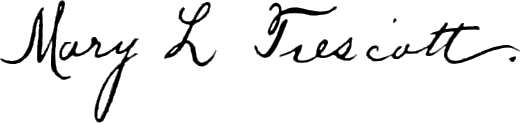

Mary Luella Trescott (1861–1935) was a legal rights attorney and the first woman appointed to local, state, and Federal judicial positions in Luzerne County, Pennsylvania. Trescott's education and positions were achieved before 1920 when ratification of the 19th Amendment granted American women the right to vote.

== Birth and family ==
Mary Luella Trescott was born in Huntington Township, Luzerne County, Pennsylvania in 1861, to Miller Barton Trescott and Permelia Stevens. She used variations of her name Mary L. Trescott and M. L. Trescott. She was a woman attorney and held offices in Luzerne County, Pennsylvania.

She died at Geisinger Hospital in Danville, Pennsylvania on April 24, 1935, following a stroke.

== Education ==
Trescott attended Eastman Business College in Poughkeepsie, New York, graduating in 1893. She studied law in the offices of Henry W. Palmer. She was admitted to the bar in Luzerne County on October 14, 1895.

== Notable legal case ==
On October 28, 1894 a house known as the "Hungarian Shanty" was destroyed in a dynamite explosion, killing three occupants and injuring eight others. Arrests were made of five African American suspects in June 1895, including Hester Brace and Sarah Miller, wives of two of the male suspects. The women were still in jail in 1897 and had not been brought to trial when Trescott became interested in their case. Trescott took on the representation of the women and successfully filed habeas corpus pleadings to obtain their release in March 1897.

== First woman to hold local, state and federal judicial positions ==
In Trescott's 1927 campaign for a seat as a judge she touted that she was the first woman from Luzerne County to hold the following positions:

- Elected school director in Wilkes-Barre, Pennsylvania in 1912
- Admitted to the Luzerne County Bar
- Admitted to practice in the Supreme Court of Pennsylvania (1901)
- Admitted to practice in the Federal District Court
- Admitted to practice in the Supreme Court of the United States
- Held position as referee in the United States bankruptcy court (1921)
