= Willowdale Estate =

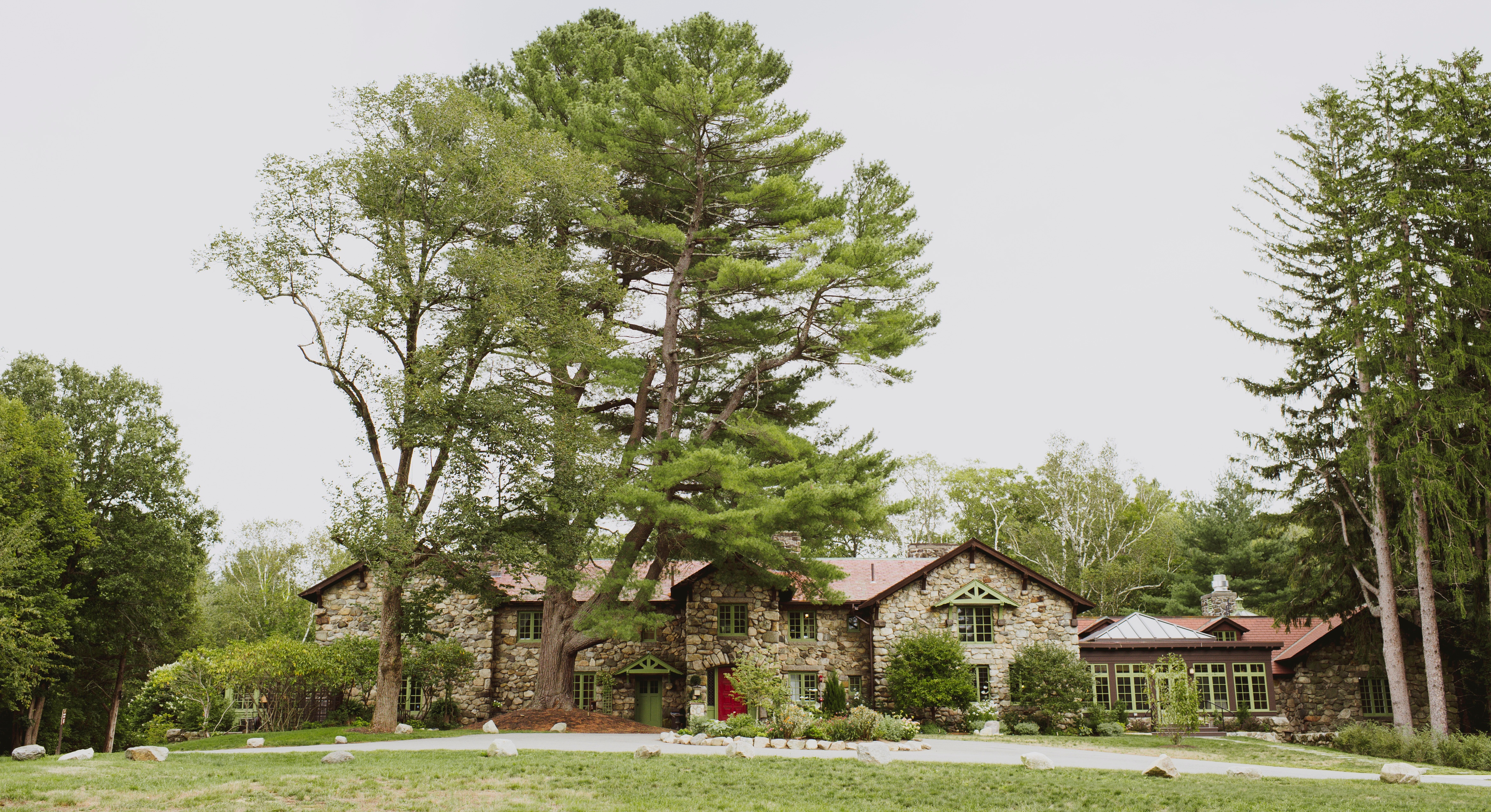

- Location within Massachusetts
- 42°39′15.3″N 70°54′24.8″W
- Location: 24 Asbury Street, Topsfield, Massachusetts

History
- Built: 1902
- Original use: Residential

Site notes
- Architect: Charles K. Cummings
- Architectural styles: Arts and Crafts; Jacobean Revival
- Restored: 1994-present
- Current use: Events Venue
- Owner: Department of Conservation and Recreation
- Website: www.willowdaleestate.com

Willowdale Estate was constructed in 1902 as the summer home of wealthy Boston lawyer Bradley Palmer, Willowdale is an Arts and Crafts, Jacobean Revival mansion in Topsfield, Massachusetts. Palmer donated the mansion and the land around it to the State of Massachusetts between 1937 and 1944. While the surrounding area has become Bradley Palmer State Park, the mansion has been a civil defense training academy and is currently leased to the Forsythe-Fandetti family as part of the Massachusetts Department of Conservation and Recreation's Historic Curatorship Program.

== History ==
Bradley Palmer began purchasing what would eventually be 10,000 acres of land across the North Shore. In 1898, he purchased a 747-acre farm owned by the Lamson family, one of the oldest families in Ipswich, Massachusetts. The family's patriarch, William Lampson, came to the New World in 1634, and his descendants spread to many of the towns in the North Shore region. Palmer purchased the hereditary home of the Lamson family from William Lampson's descendant Arthur Lamson. On the property is an 18th-century farm house, also a DCR property. The now heavily forested area would have originally been empty fields and pastures, ideal for Palmer's equestrian hobbies, especially with its close proximity to the famous Myopia Hunt Club. The mansion would have had a sweeping view of the surrounding landscape, including the Ipswich River.

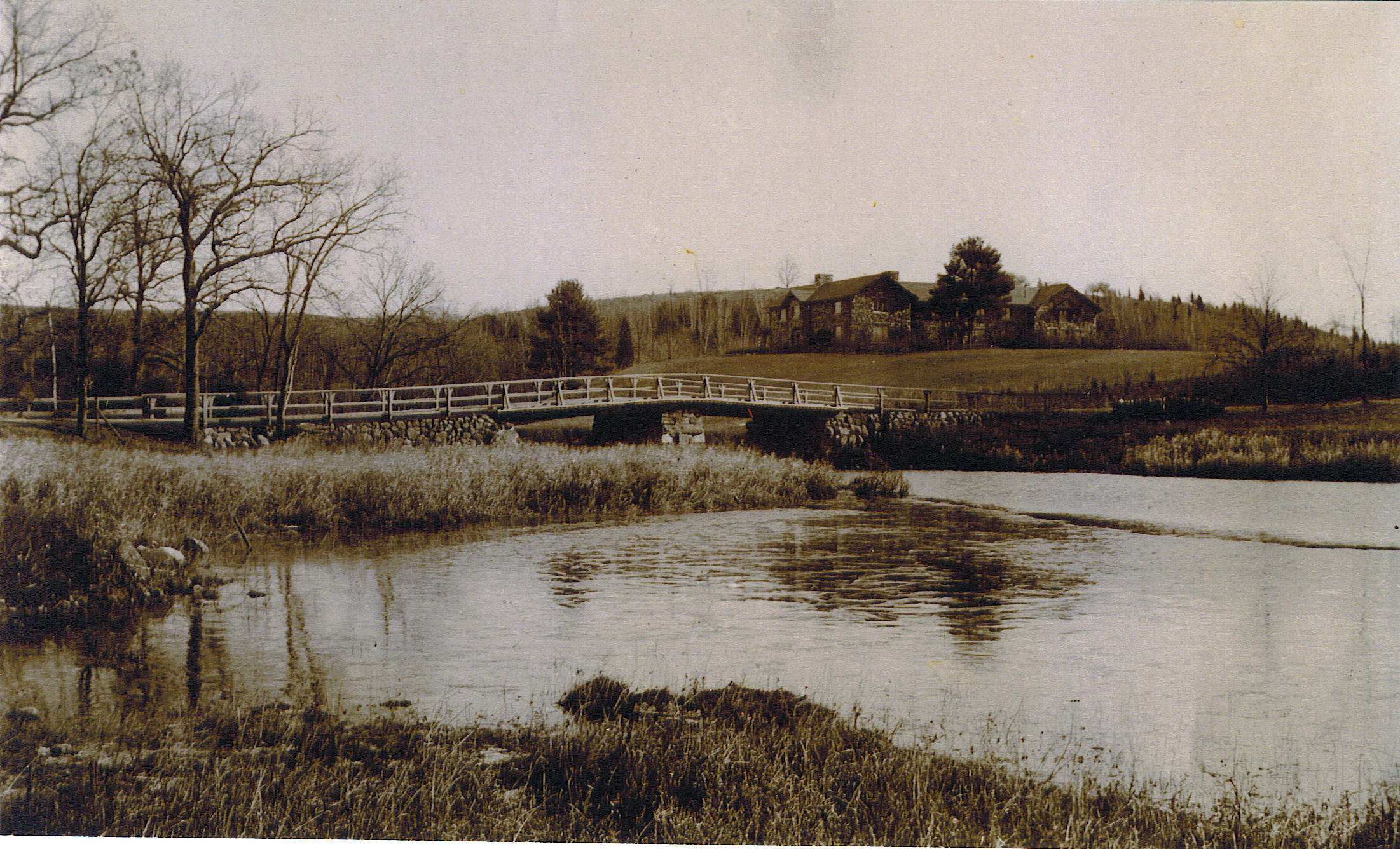
Pre-1915 Photo of Willow Dale

Bradley Palmer chose Charles K. Cummings, a Boston architect with the firm Andrews, Jaques & Rantoul, to design his summer retreat. Cummings also designed the nearby Cummings Estate for his sister Margaret Cummings. The company hired for the stonework was Connolly Brothers of nearby Beverly, a company still in existence today. For the interior woodwork, Herbert W. Porter of Wenham was chosen. Cummings conceived Willow Dale (as it was originally called) as a single U-shaped building that included domestic, equestrian, and agricultural functions. In an article for Architectural Review in 1904, Cummings describes the layout of the building as

a rather unusual arrangement, the master’s house, the quarters for a farmer or caretaker, and the stable, all being joined together under one roof. This was done with a view to economy of construction and management; and especially during the winter months this grouping together of quarters, which more often appear as separate buildings, has been found convenient and agreeable

The north wing of the house was used for domestic functions, with a dining room, guest rooms, a study, and Palmer's master suite above the entrance so that he could look out at the Ipswich River. The southern wing held the carriage house and stable. The exterior of the mansion is made from fieldstone from the surrounding farms with a red-slate roof. For the interior, Cummings used primarily cherry and oak, finished with wax so that the interior maintained a natural look. Construction of the mansion concluded in December 1902, having begun earlier that year. The interior decoration would take a number of years to complete, however, though it was functionally done by 1904, as shown by the pictures Cummings provides in his article.

=== Renovation and addition ===
The Willow Dale property expanded throughout Bradley Palmer's lifetime. At the peak of its operation, more than thirty buildings, primarily relating to agriculture or husbandry, but also a garage, a pump house, reservoir, and homes for staff. Records kept by the Topsfield Historical Society state that the addition of these buildings took place intermittently between 1902 and 1915. By 1915, Palmer had come to view his "modest summer home" as a bit too modest. His rapid financial success, shown by tax records stating the amount he paid increased from $15,645 in 1908 to $128,574 in 1923, meant a need for a home that could entertain guests beyond just a few intimate friends. For the job, Palmer again hired Cummings, who added a significant addition to the house's southern wing. The entrance changed from the north wing, directly under Palmer's bedroom, to the western face of the house where it still is today. In the south wing, the stable became a formal dining room, while the coach house became a ballroom, complete with an orchestra balcony, though the exterior of both remained the same. The dining room became an eclectic mix of classical, medieval, and even Central American artwork, while the ballroom resembles a medieval great hall. The interior of the mansion became more elegant with the addition of a number of stained glass windows and the replacement of small, tile fireplaces with ornate, Italian marble ones. Italian artisans were hired to do the design work on the fireplaces as well as the woodwork in the ballroom and new entrance.

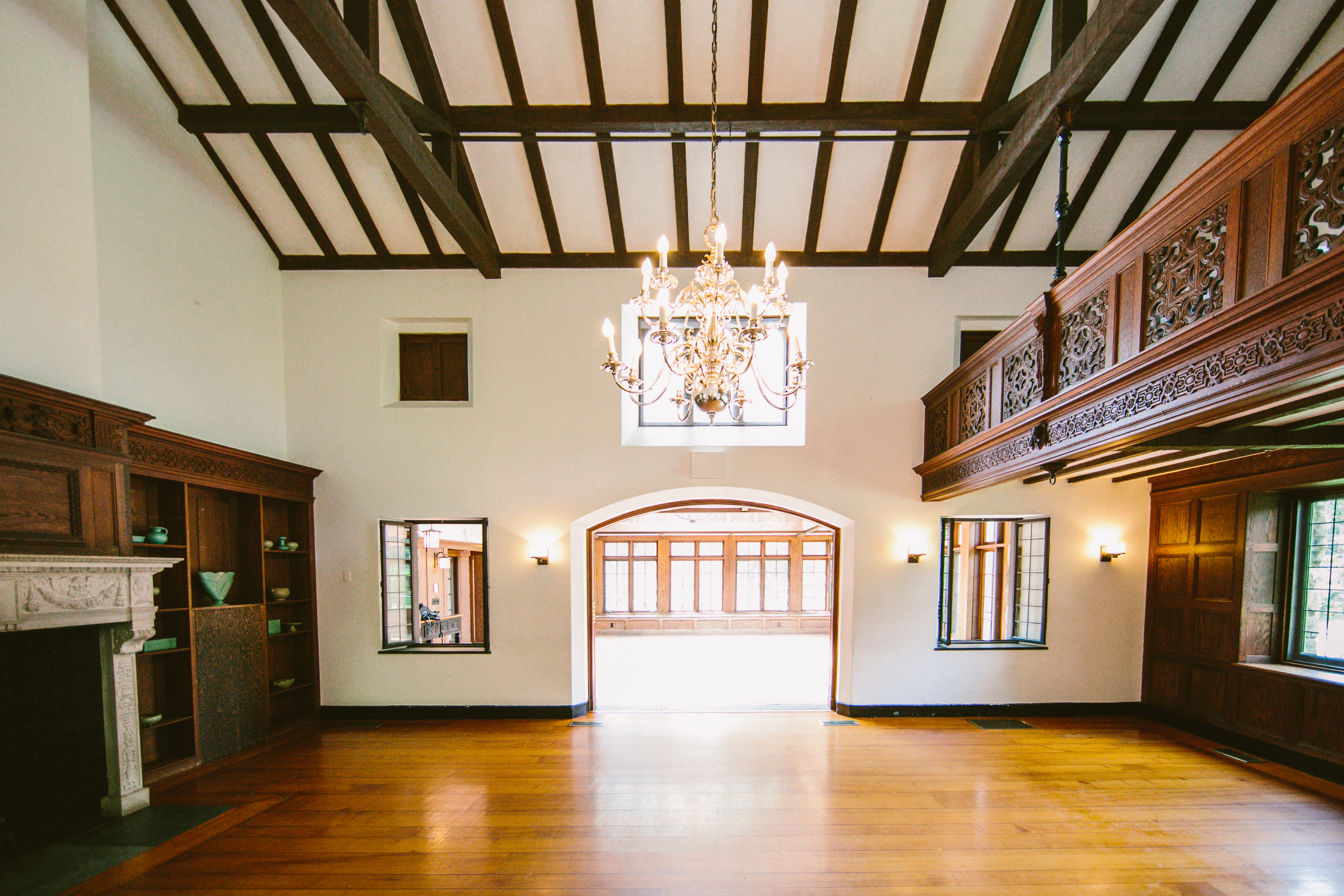
Ballroom added in 1915 Renovation

=== Landscaping and Scotland ===
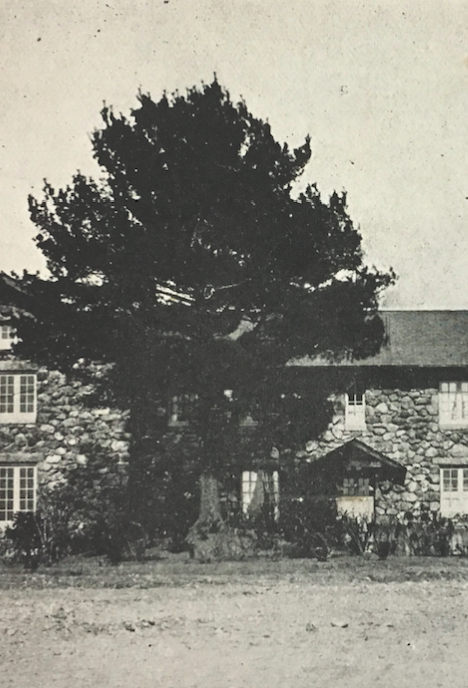
1902

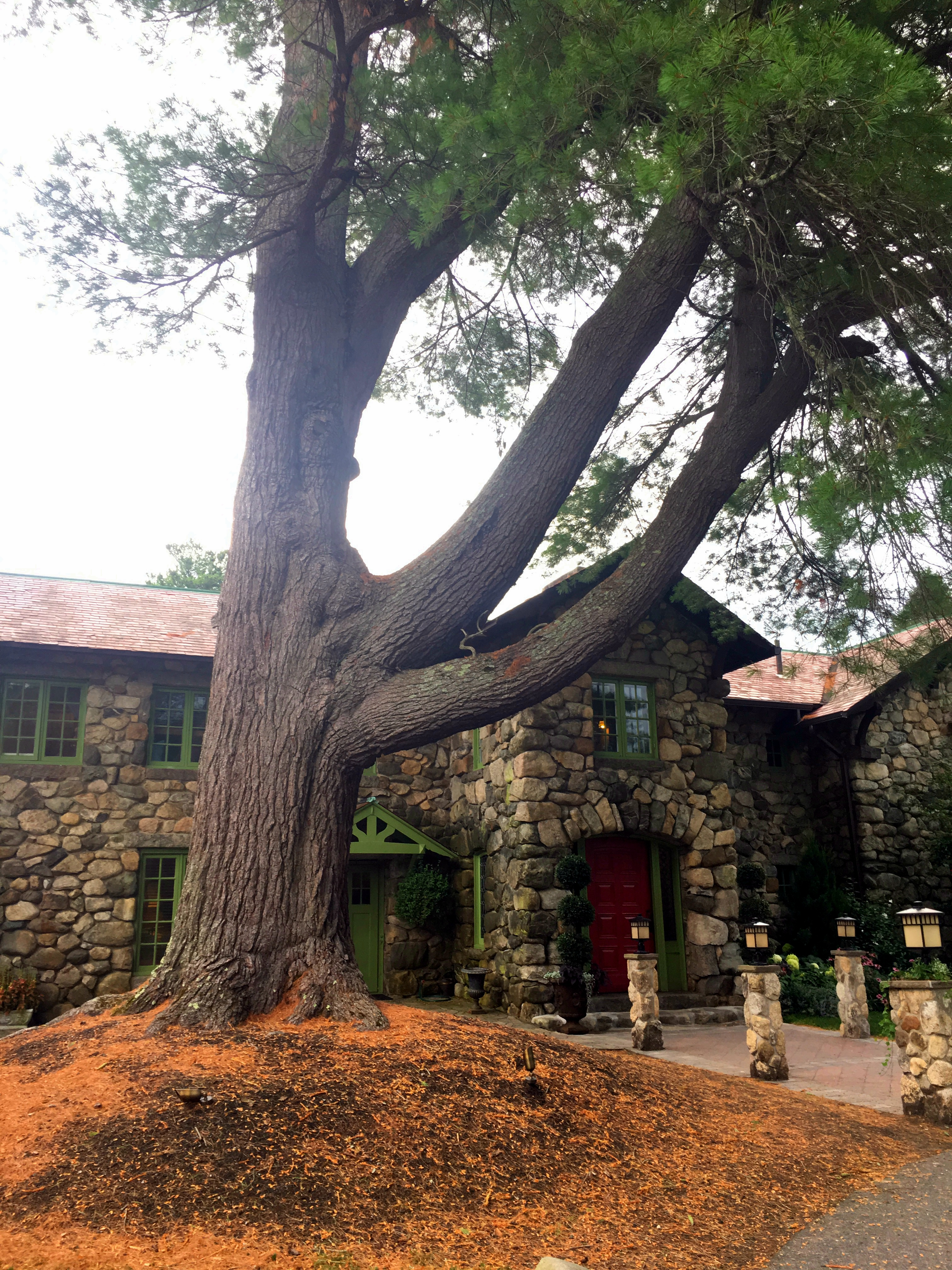
2017

Eastern White Pine in front of Willowdale Estate, 1902 and 2017

Palmer meticulously oversaw the landscaping of his new summer home. He imported plants to the estate from across the America, but especially his native Pennsylvania and New Hampshire.He consulted widely with botanists and gardeners in the Boston area, who recommended nurseries both domestic and foreign. One of his most remarkable influences was Scotland, where he not only got plants for his garden, but also his gardener. A series of letters held by the Topsfield Historical Society from the first two decade of the Twentieth Century document his extensive communication with Ben Reid & Company, Ltd. of Aberdeen, Scotland, now known as Ben Reid Nursery & Garden Centre. Palmer believed that, owing to the shared harsh climate of Scotland and New England, Scottish plants were well suited for his idyllic retreat. When Palmer visited the Ben Reid nurseries, the company arranged a meeting between the local Aberdeen gardener William Keith and Palmer. The story goes that Palmer was impressed by Keith, but, despite being a bachelor himself, Palmer had a policy that his employees be married. Palmer suggested that if Keith found a wife in the three days before Palmer sailed, he was welcome to take the job in Massachusetts. Keith apparently took this to heart, and three days later he and his new wife embarked with Palmer back to Topsfield. After twenty years of happy marriage, Mrs. Keith died at Willow Dale. Soon after, Bill Keith, evidently worried that this violated the terms of his employment, quickly wrote his wife's sister back in Scotland, asking for her hand in marriage. She accepted, moved to Willow Dale, and the two remained married the remainder of Keith's life. The Scottish connection carries throughout Palmer's home, not just in the landscaping. The prominent Cross of St. Andrew on the library mantelpiece demonstrates this, as well as the numerous Jacobean elements of the mansion.

== Architecture ==
Palmer and Cummings designed Willow Dale in the Arts and Crafts style. Arts and Crafts architecture built on the philosophical momentum of the Gothic Revival begun in England under the works of authors such as John Ruskin, Augustus Pugin, and William Morris. Ruskin's The Seven Lamps of Architecture served as a philosophical manifesto for the movement while Morris was the embodiment of the movement's ideals. These three major ideals, simplicity, unified expression, and use of regional traditions, derived from both medievalism and anti-industrial sentiments.

Willow Dale incorporates these ideals. Palmer intentionally desired his home to be "a modest country retreat." To modern visitors, the mansion may seem to have failed in this regard. However, when compared with other mansions of the era, such as the Breakers or even the neighboring Crane Estate, Willow Dale is simple. For example, Willow Dale uses comparable materials to these mansions, such as Italian marble and oak, there is minimal design work. The marble is unpolished and the wood uses a wax finish, so that natural forms of the elements are apparent. The use of fieldstone from the former Lamson farm in the exterior contributes to mansion's subliminal weight, while also respecting the history of the area surrounding the mansion. Even after the 1915 renovation, when Palmer's wealth had substantially increased, the interior design maintains the unified commitment to simplicity found in the original work. The design work added at this time refined many rougher elements of the original mansion, such as changing the materials used for the fireplaces and adding natural ornaments to the interior woodwork, while keeping its rustic charm.

Also added during the 1915 renovation were a number of stained glass windows, particularly in the dining room, which feature mythical figures, quotes from Virgil and Shakespeare, and the Palmer family crest. One of the more surprising features of the dining room is a large Madonna of Light mosaic taken from a Mexican church during one of Palmer's business trips for United Fruit Company.

Many describe Willow Dale as a Tudor Revival home, however, this is a misnomer. The relation between the Arts and Crafts movement and the various subsets of 19th-century architectural medievalism causes confusion the classification of Willow Dale's medieval elements. The lack of half-timbering, mullions, and jettying, for example, excludes Willow Dale from being considered Tudor Revival. Nevertheless, it could be considered as having a Jacobean influence shown in the blend of classical and medieval elements. In design work, this manifested in a natural interpretation of scrolls, lozenges, and straps found both in Jacobean Revival architecture and Willow Dale. The context of Jacobean architecture as Scottish inspired movement matches the Scottish emphasis placed on Willow Dale. While Willow Dale can by no means be considered an exclusively Jacobean structure, it certainly contains Jacobean elements.

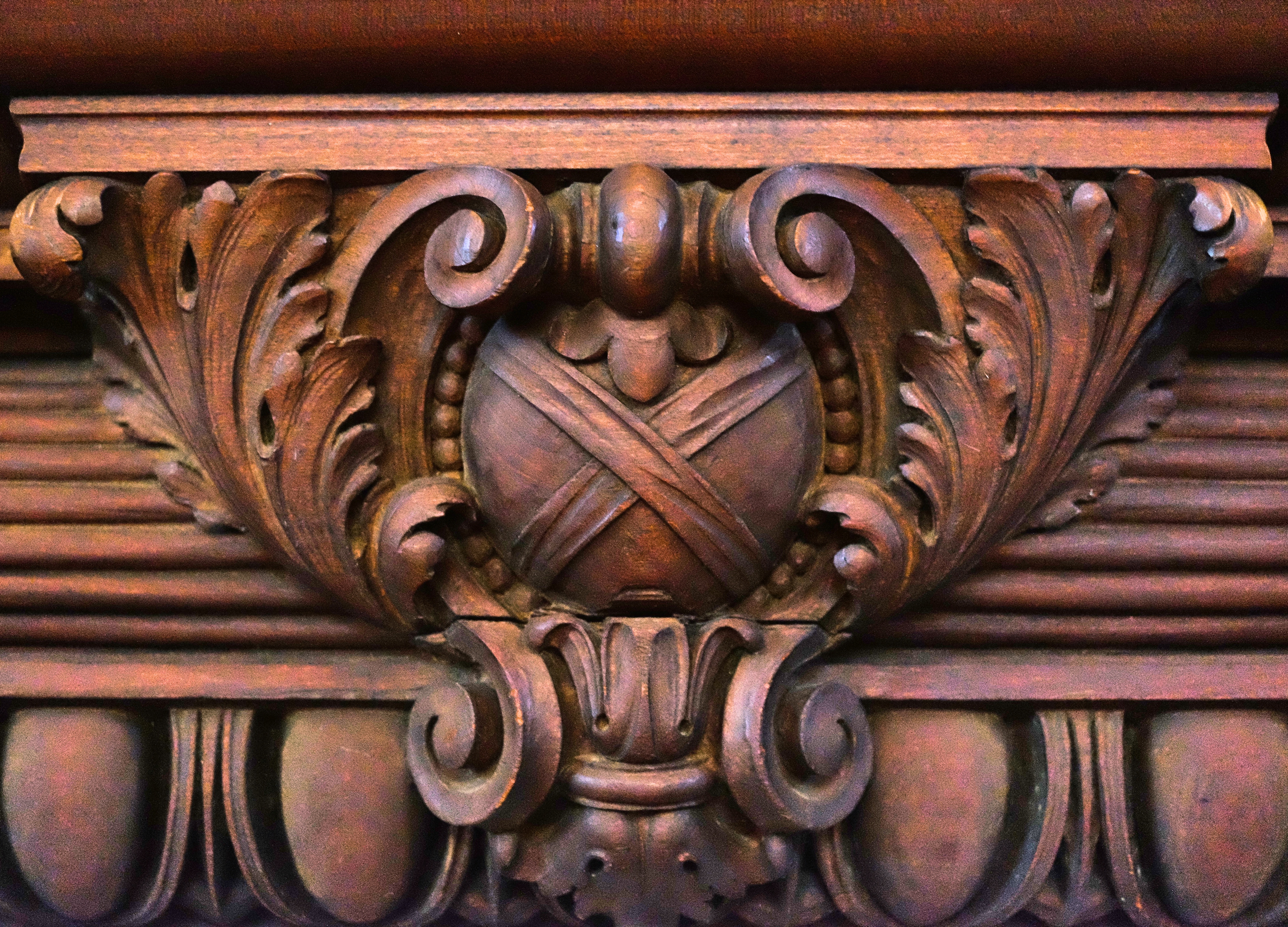
Cross of St. Andrew on the fireplace mantelpiece in Willowdale

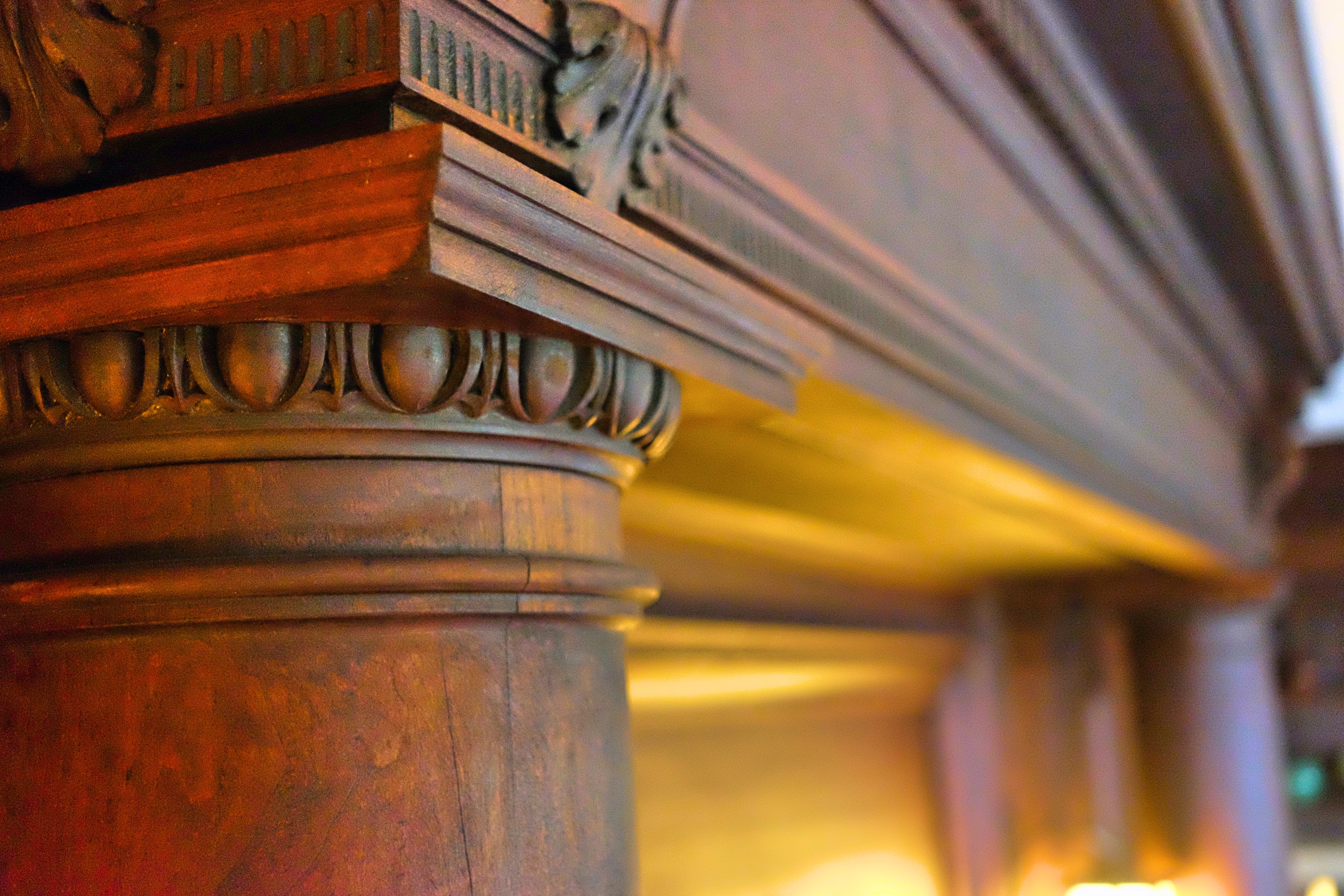
Column using natural designs in library

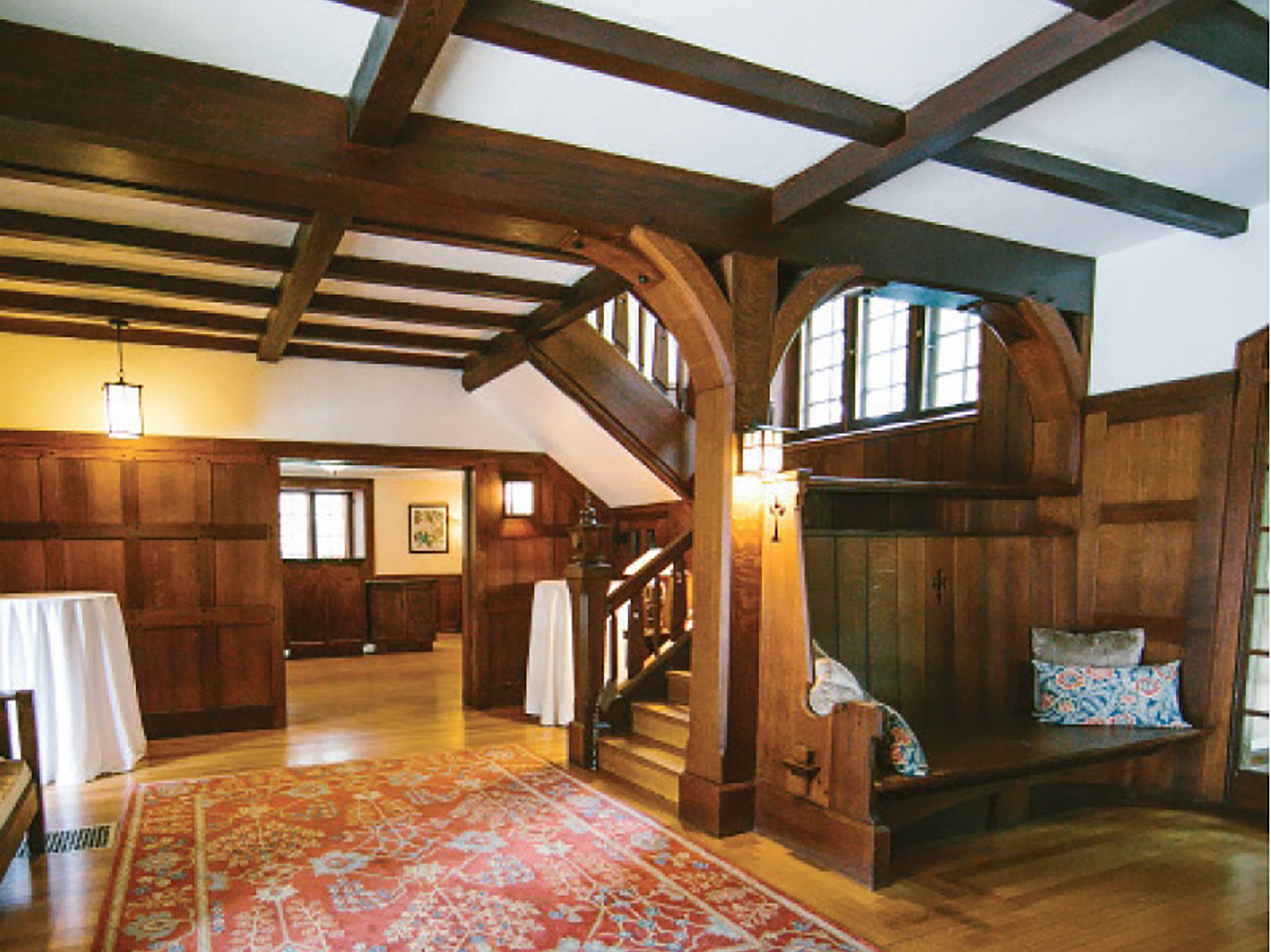
Original entrance hall and current parlor at Willowdale

== Uses ==
=== Police Training ===
After Bradley Palmer's death in 1946, the land around Willow Dale became what is now Bradley Palmer State Park, while the State of Massachusetts began using the mansion as a civil defense training academy in 1949. The formal dining room became a recreation room with a ping-pong table, while the once grand ballroom was used for drills and the occasional conference. Due to lack of funds, the building fell into disrepair over the next fifty years, eventually being deemed unfit for use for anything besides storage. The mansion was added to the Department of Conservation and Recreation's list of threatened historic properties.

=== Events Venue ===
In 1994, the DCR began its Historic Curatorship Program designed to restore properties threatened by neglect and vandalism. In the program, a curator leases a property rent free from the DCR for a duration of twenty or more years, agreeing to front the money for the restoration and open the property to the public on at least a biannual basis. In doing so the "DCR secures the long-term preservation of threatened historic sites and Curators exchange their hard work and unique skills for the opportunity to live or work in a one-of-a-kind location."

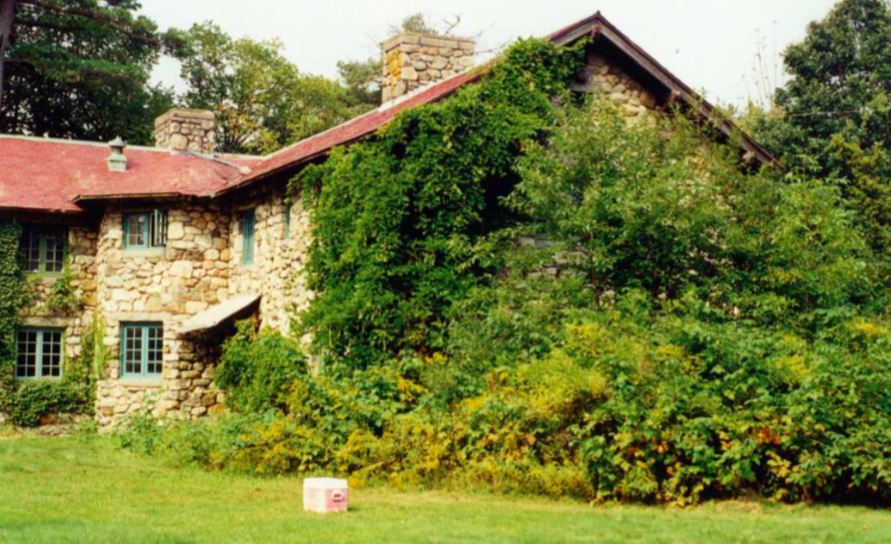
Pergola Before Forsythe-Fandetti Restoration

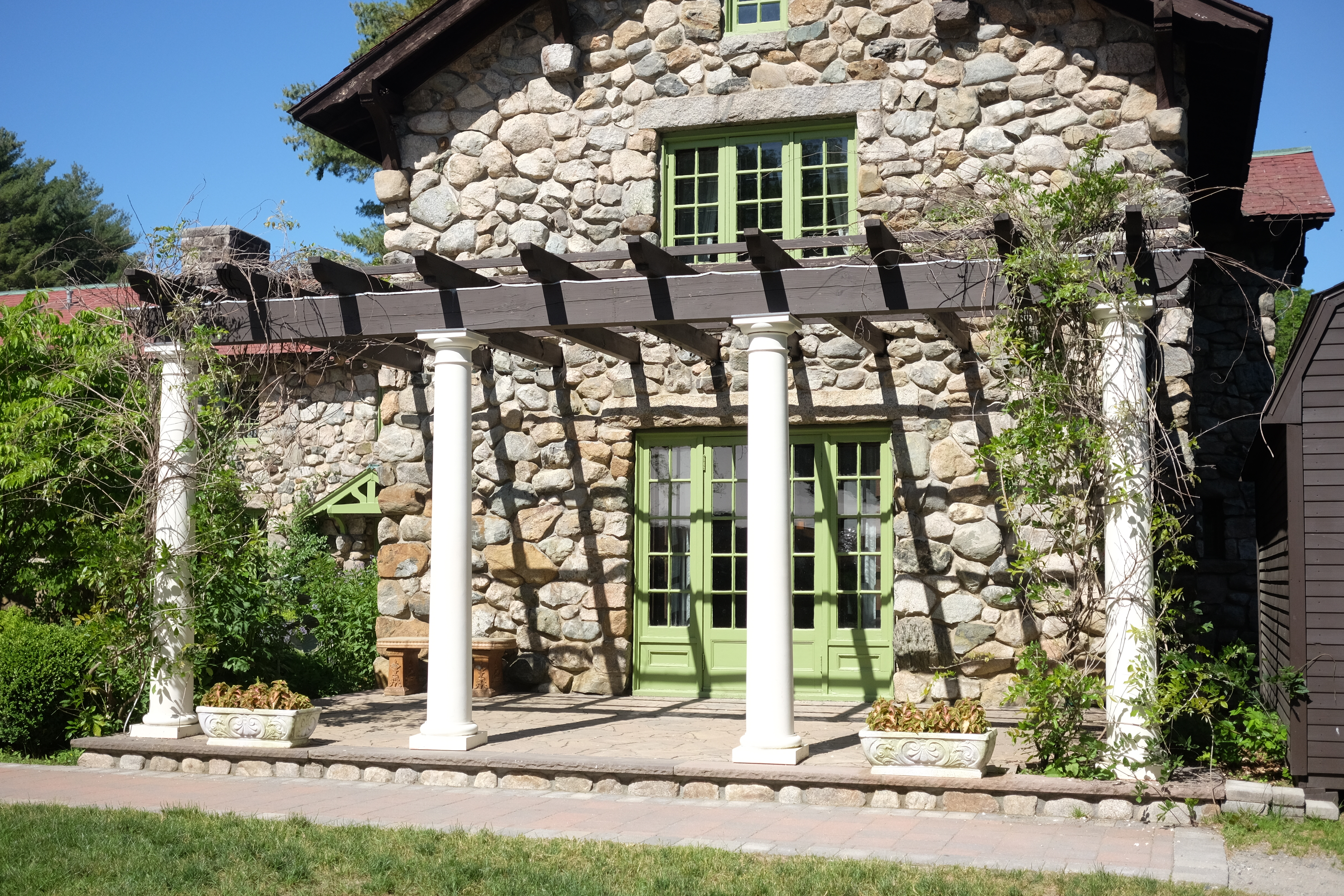
Pergola After Forsythe-Fandetti Restoration

In 1999, the Forsythe-Fandetti family signed a fifty-year lease with the DCR with the intent of turning the property into an events venue. The Forsythe-Fandettis had already restored multiple historic properties in Cambridge, Massachusetts and gave management of the company to their daughter Briar Rose Forsythe. In 1999 they began restoring the property, a process that would last nearly a decade. Besides of having to get the building up to code as an events venue, including installing modern plumbing, electricity, and heating, the building was in terrible disarray. The roof was in danger of collapse, thus a new red slate roof had to be installed.

Finally, in 2007, Briar Forsythe opened her own events, catering and planning company calling the property "Willowdale Estate". Willowdale Estate hosted its first event, a wedding, on 7-7-2007. Today, the estate offers full service events planning for both corporate and private events. A full-time catering staff is present along with events coordinators. Willowdale Estate has been awarded numerous awards including the 2016 A-list "Best Wedding Venue" award for the greater Boston area.

== Gallery ==
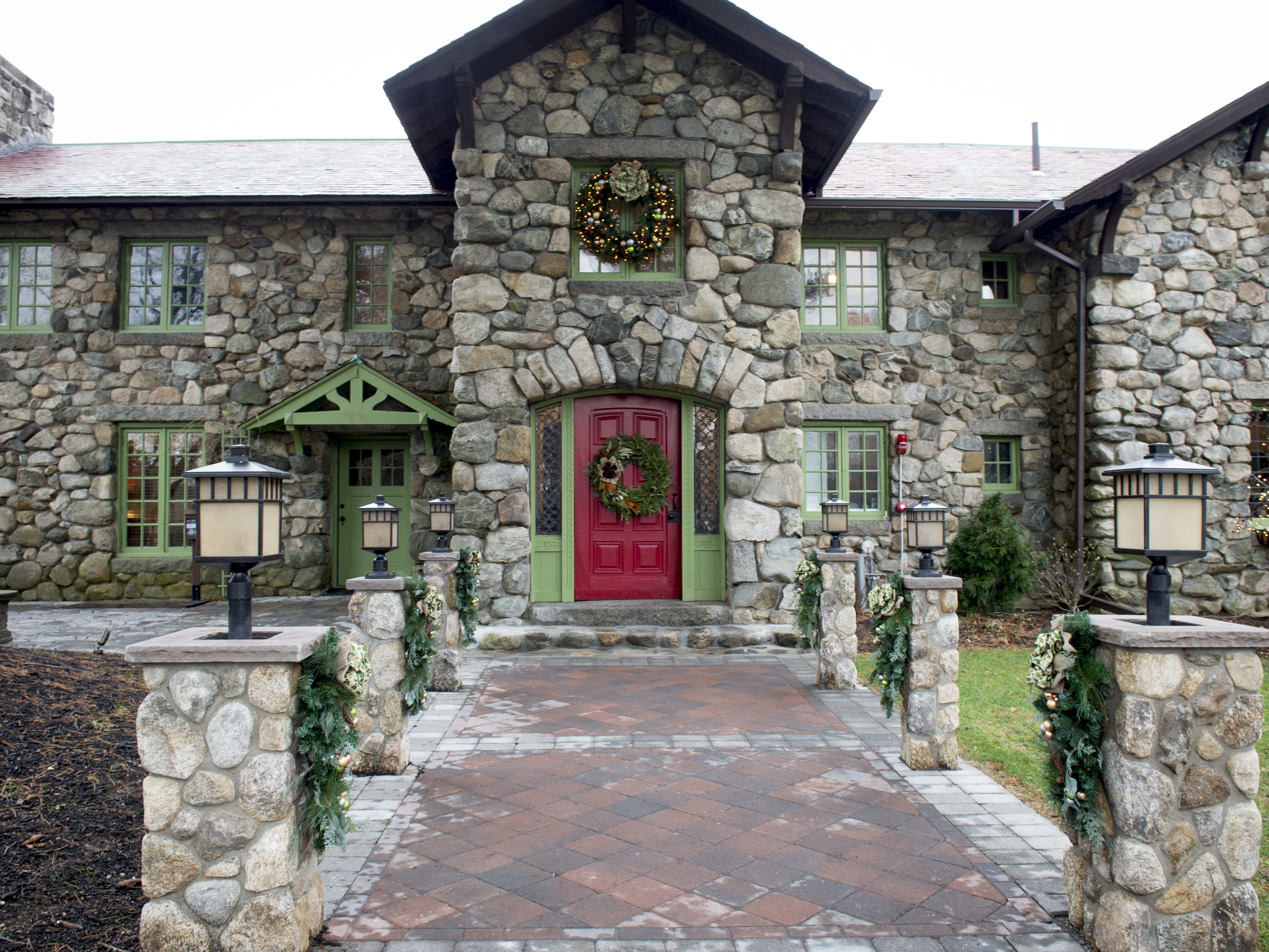
Front of Willowdale Estate

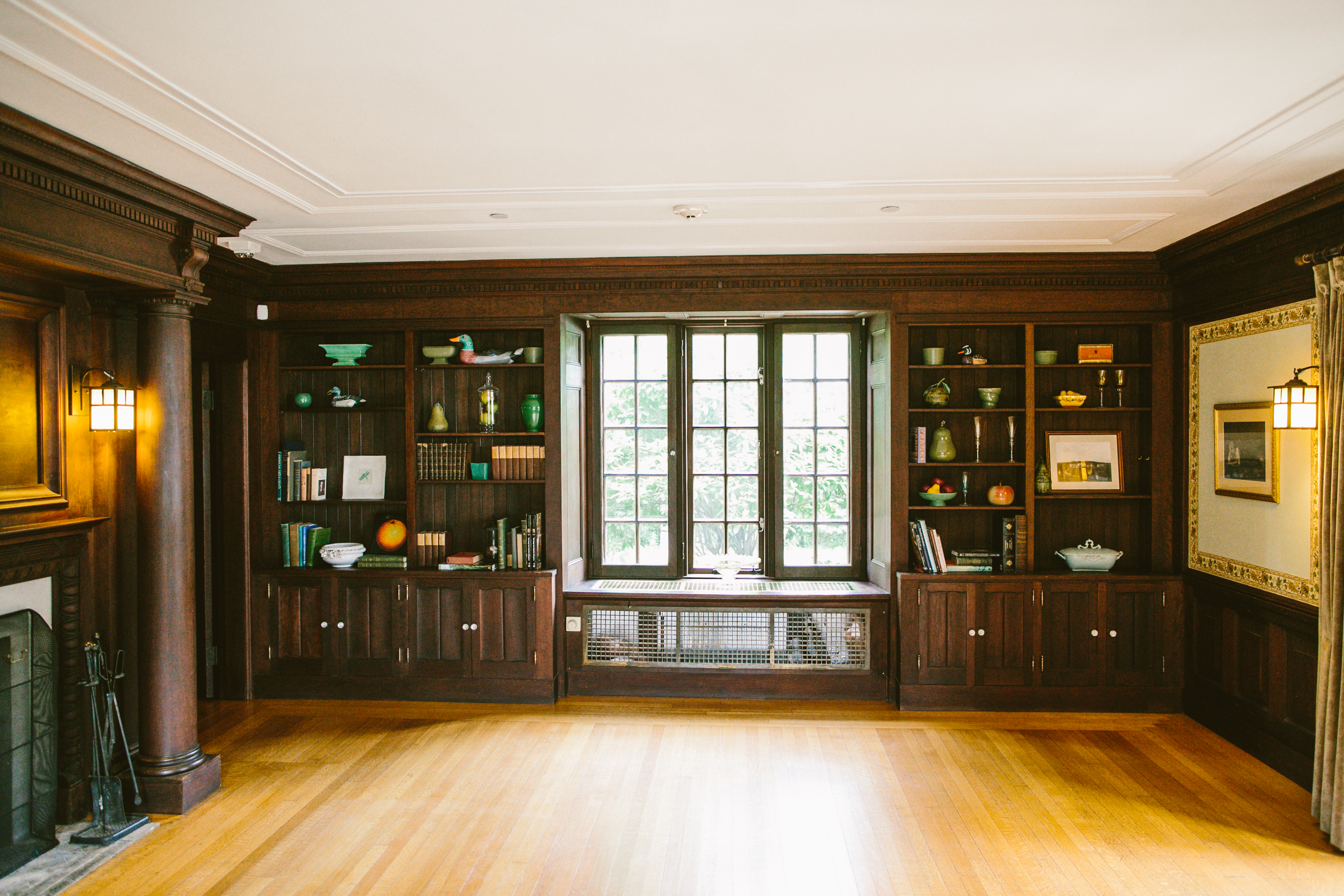
Willowdale Library

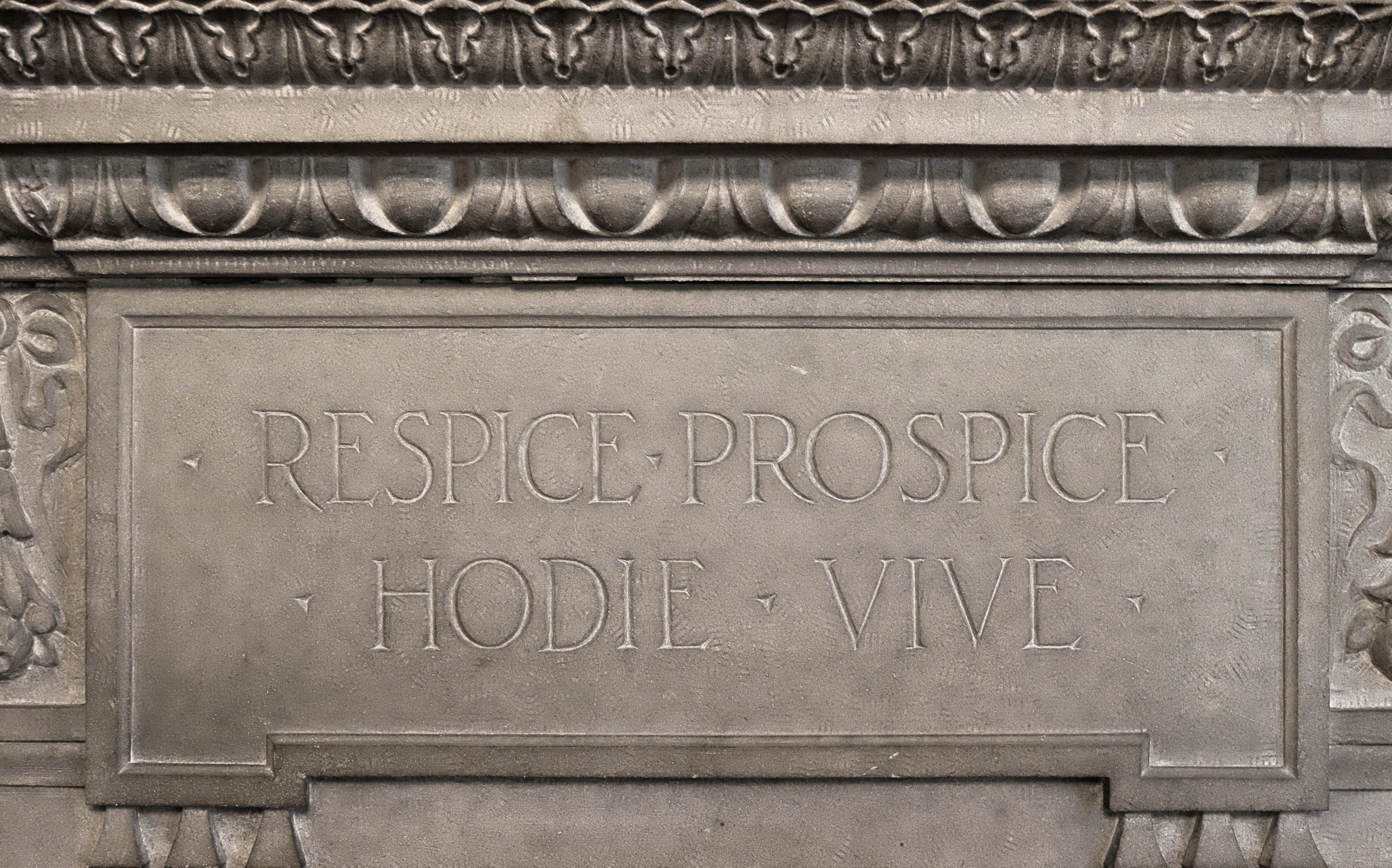
Inscription on Great Room fireplace at Willowdale Estate

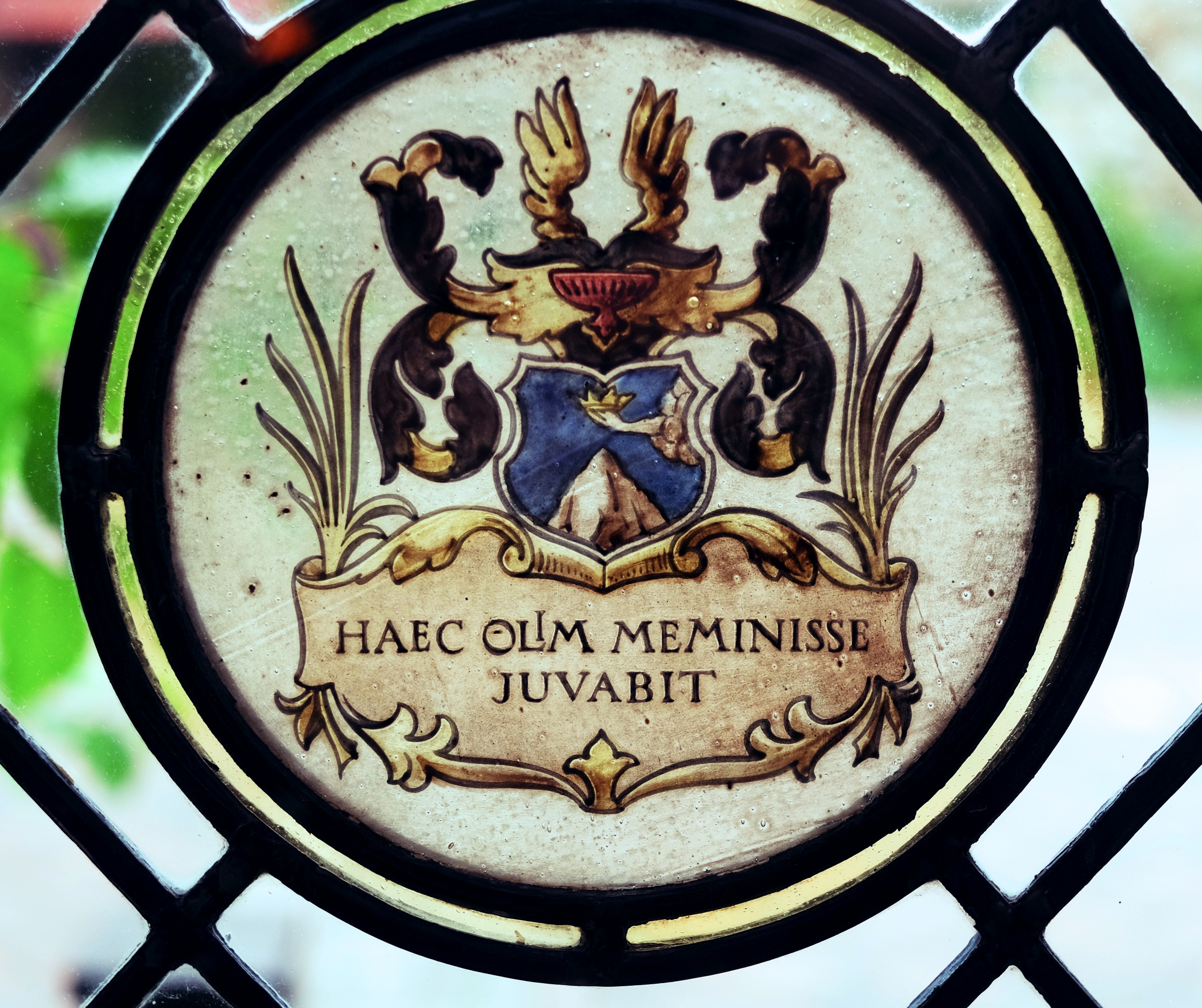
Quote from book one of Virgil's Aeneid on a dining room window at Willowdale.

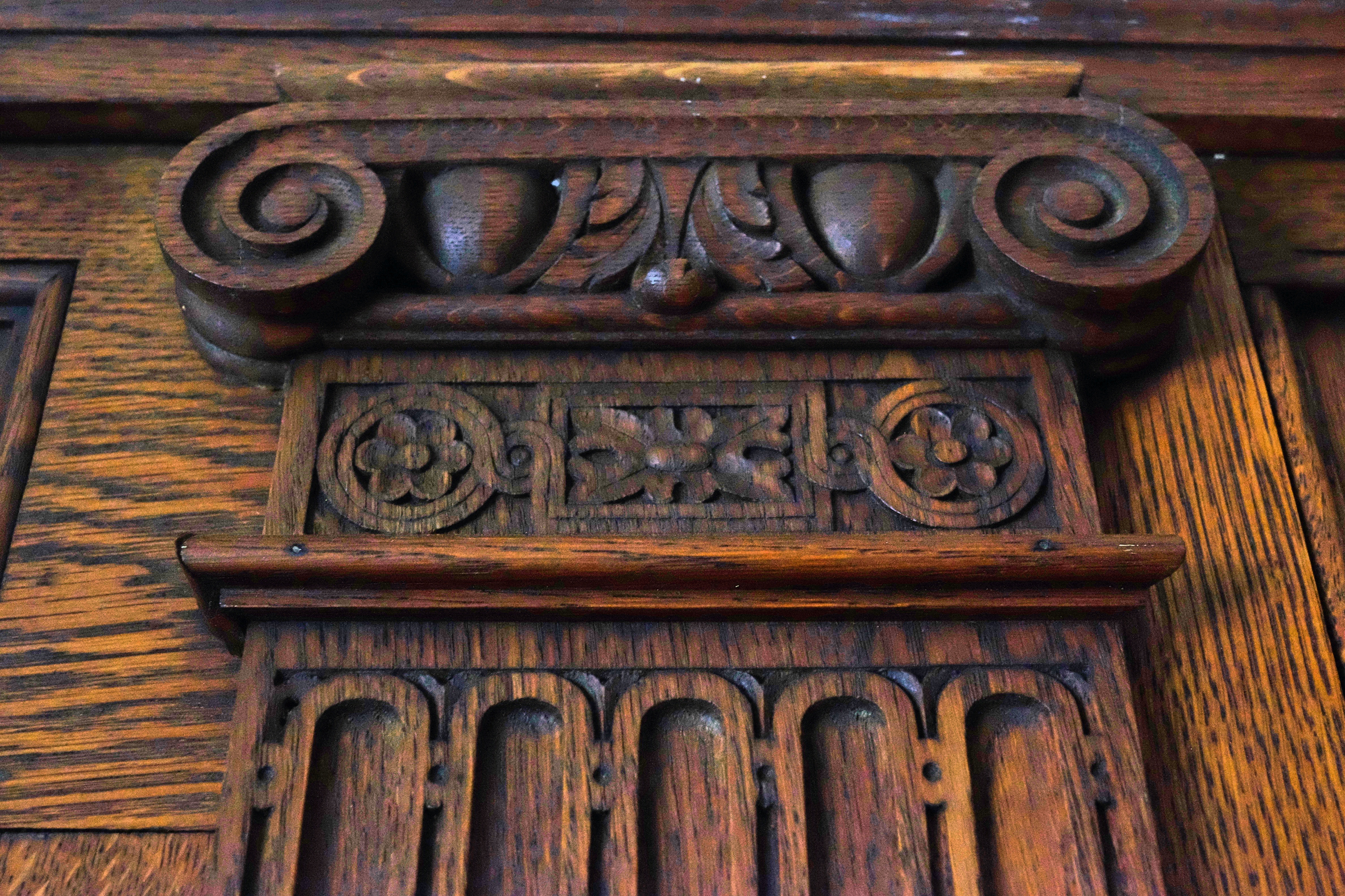
Ionic Pilaster in Willowdale's entrance hall.

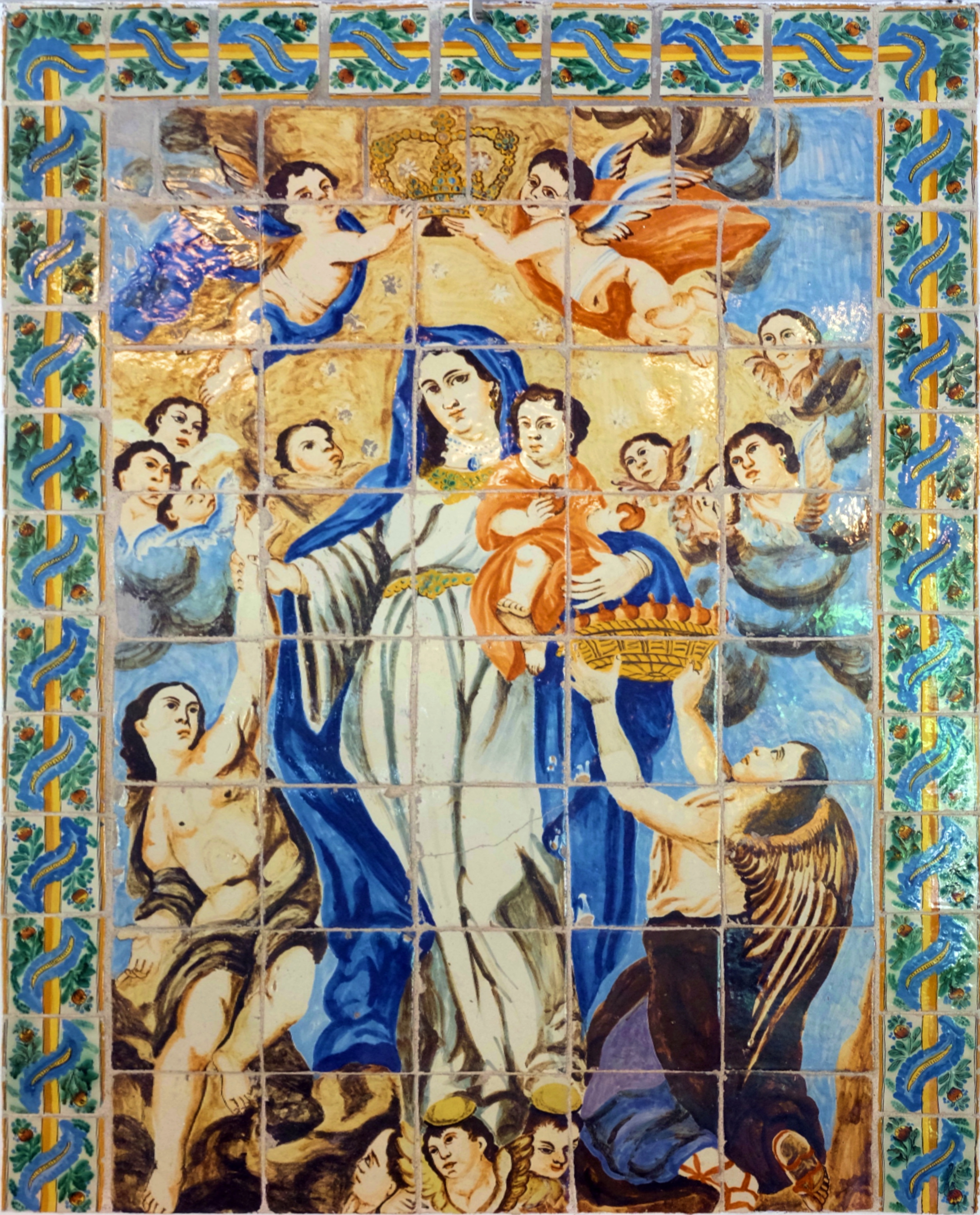
Mexican Madonna of Light found in the Willowdale Mansion

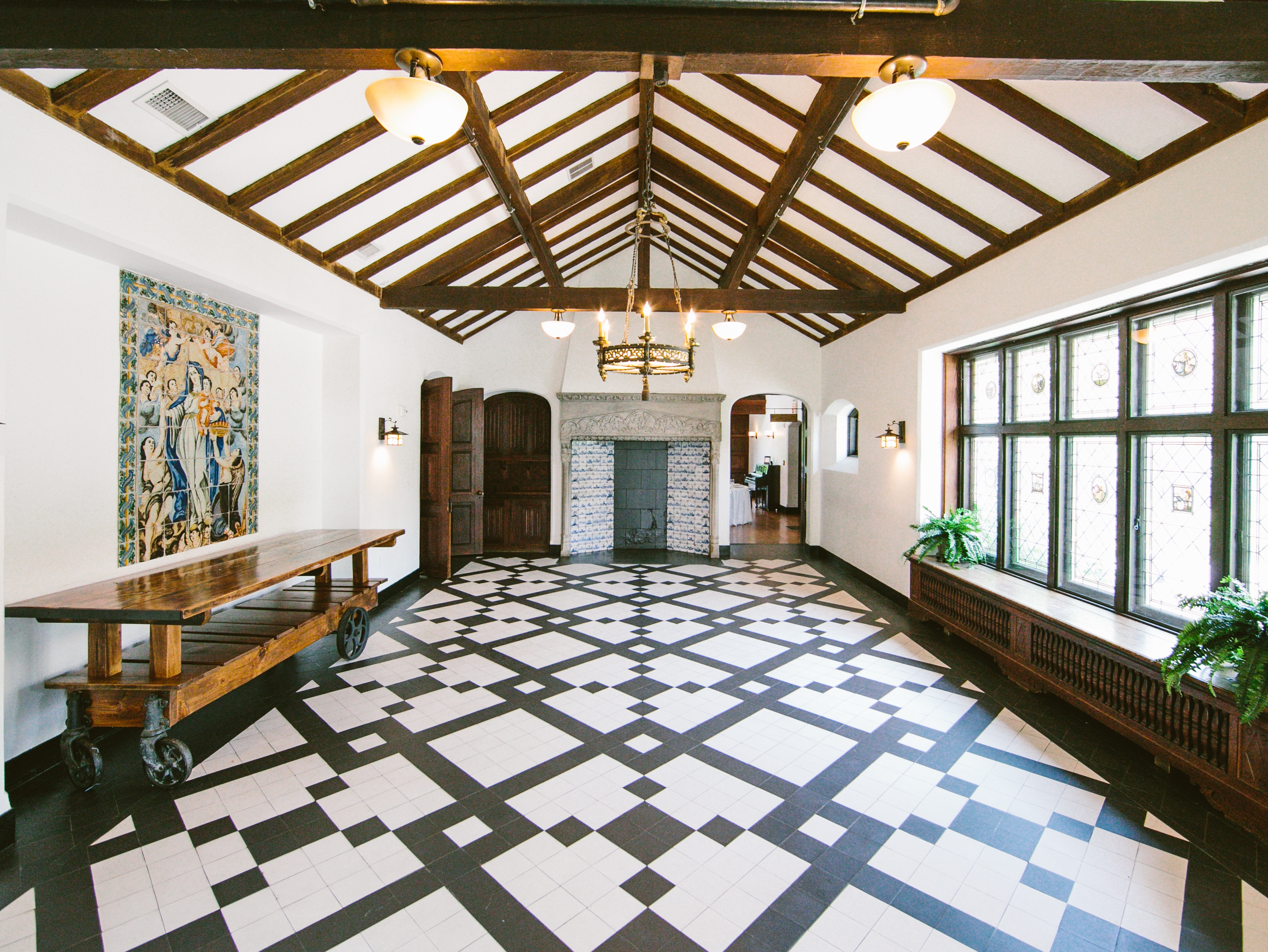
Photo of the dining room at Willowdale Estate
