= Bradley Palmer =

American attorney and businessman (1866–1946)

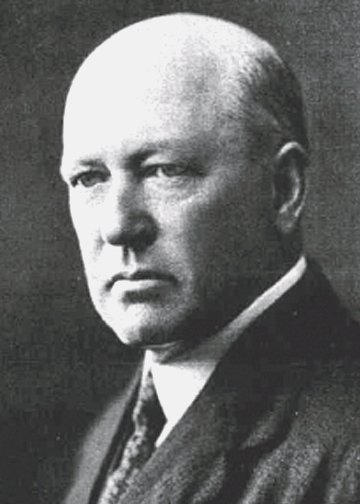
- Palmer in 1910
- Born: Bradley Webster Palmer; June 28, 1866; Wilkes-Barre, Pennsylvania, US
- Died: November 9, 1946 (aged 80); Boston, Massachusetts, US
- Resting place: Hollenback Cemetery; Wilkes-Barre, Pennsylvania
- Education: Harvard University; Phillips Exeter Academy
- Occupations: Attorney, businessman
- Parent(s): Henry Wilbur Palmer (father); Ellen Webster Palmer (mother)

Bradley Webster Palmer (June 28, 1866 – November 9, 1946) was an American attorney and businessman. He was involved with the creation and development of multiple corporations, including the United Fruit Company, Gillette Safety Razor Corp., and International Telephone & Telegraph Corporation. He was also part of the American delegation at the Paris Peace Conference following World War I.

From 1937 to 1944, Palmer donated his extensive land holdings to the state of Massachusetts. These lands today make up the 721-acre (292 ha) Bradley Palmer State Park in Topsfield, Massachusetts.

== Early life and education ==
The American Palmers in Palmer's ancestral line came from William Palmer, Nottinghamshire, who was possibly one of the original Scrooby congregation of puritan separatists. He sailed on the vessel Fortune in 1621 from Plymouth, England to Plymouth, Massachusetts, settling finally in Duxbury. His grandfather on his father's side, Gideon, moved to Pennsylvania in 1836.

Palmer was born on June 28, 1866, in Wilkes-Barre, Pennsylvania. His father was politician Henry W. Palmer. His mother was children's rights advocare Ellen W. Palmer.

Palmer's parents sent him to Phillips Exeter Academy in New Hampshire, where he was admitted at the age of sixteen in 1882. At Exeter, Palmer was involved in The Exonian, debate club, the Christian Fraternity, and the G. L. Soule Literary Society, as well as playing tennis, baseball, and lacrosse, and being his class secretary.

From there, he went immediately to Harvard University, receiving an AB in 1888. He was a treasurer of the Harvard Lampoon and a member of the Hasty Pudding Club. He played football and baseball for his class teams, and he was a member of the Institute of 1770 (later merged with the Hasty Pudding Club), Delta Kappa Epsilon (aka The Dickey Club), the Historical Club, the Finance Club, the St. Paul's Society, and the Varsity Club. He stayed on an extra year in Harvard University School of Law, earning the AM in 1889. He was a proctor that year.

== Career ==
=== Law and business ===
Returning to Wilkes-Barre, he went to work in his father's law office there in 1889 at the age of 23 and passed the bar in Pennsylvania in 1890. He returned to Boston in 1891 and passed the bar in Massachusetts the following year.

Until 1899, Palmer's chief work in the firm of Storey, Thorndike and Palmer had been to check the legality of bonds and then to handle the legal business of the Boston Fruit Company, the company of Andrew W. Preston, a Boston banana importer.

In 1899, he created the United Fruit Company by a merger of Preston's firm and the banana import business of Minor Cooper Keith. He became a director and a permanent member of the executive committee, while his law partners were listed as executives. Their first move was to buy outright or buy an interest in fourteen competitors, establishing a monopoly on the Costa Rican banana import business and controlling eighty percent of the entire business in the United States.

These moves under Palmer's tutelage brought instant wealth to everyone concerned. The profits in 1899 were $1.6 million, and were up to $6.2 million by 1907. For all business purposes, Palmer was United Fruit. When the first anti-trust suit was brought against United Fruit in 1909, charging that it had created a monopoly and was using its financial interests in the competition (in this case the Bluefields Steamship Company) to suppress their business, Palmer, as secretary, was named along with Preston and Keith, the president and vice president.

Palmer was a counsel for the Sinclair Oil Corporation during the Teapot Dome scandal.

=== Public service ===
During World War I, Palmer took a brief break from his legal career. In December 1917, he went to Washington, D.C. and joined the Office of Alien Property Custodian, which was charged with the investigation of attempts by German nationals to conceal their extensive property of all sorts in the United States, and with the confiscation and disposition of this property. Where he did both investigations and dispositions, mainly by sale, for which legal expertise was required. All members of the APC served without pay. He also was appointed as counsel to the United States House Committee on the Judiciary. In 1918, he was also appointed to an advisory committee supporting the Federal Reserve Board of Governors, also serving without pay; he was its lawyer.

After the War, Palmer continued serving his country after being appointed by President Wilson to the delegation to the Paris Peace Conference. Wilson chose Palmer because of his experience with the Alien Property Custodian. In Palmer's own words: "At the end of the War, President Wilson required someone familiar with the operations of the Alien Property Custodian to attend the peace conferences in Paris. He selected me. I had no official title, but was assigned as the representative of the United States to several sub-committees whose duty was to prepare the provisions of the treatise of economic character. Our sphere covered restoration of business relations, adjustment of private contracts, property rights and interests, and similar considerations". The elements negotiated by Palmer and his fellow economic delegates made it into the separate U.S.–German Peace Treaty in 1921.

== Personal life ==
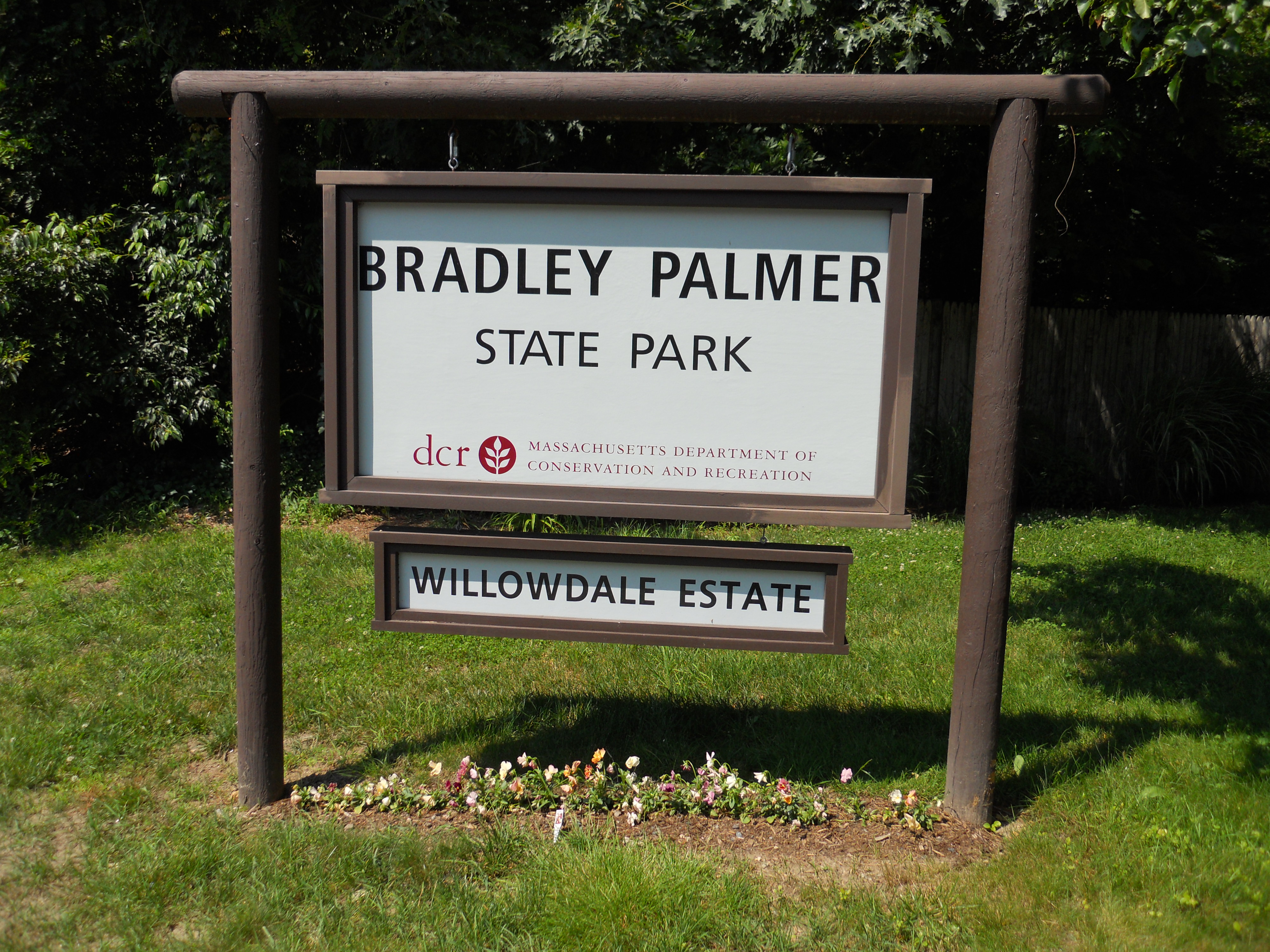
Entrance sign for Bradley Palmer State Park

Palmer never married, but was involved in the social life of the North Shore of Massachusetts, which is relatively densely populated with horse farms. He belonged to Myopia Hunt Club in Hamilton, Massachusetts, known for its equestrianism. Palmer hosted club events on his estate. Palmer enjoyed smoking a cigar with the end stuck in a pipe bowl.

Beginning in 1891, Palmer began to acquire land. In 1898, he purchased the hereditary farm holdings of the Lamson family, some 747 acres (3.02 km^{2}). This would become the estate in which he resided, known as Willowdale Estate.

Palmer died on November 9, 1946, aged 80, in Boston, from pulmonary illness. He is the namesake of Bradley Palmer State Park.

== Bibliography ==
- Kulp, George Brubake (2009). "Henry Wilbur Palmer". Families of the Wyoming Valley. BiblioLife. pp. 194–203.
- United States. Alien Property Custodian (1977). Alien Property Custodian report: a detailed report by the Alien Property Custodian of all proceedings had by him under the Trading with the enemy act during the calendar year 1918, and to the close of business on February 15, 1919. New York: Arno Press.
