= Laurie Hays =

American journalist

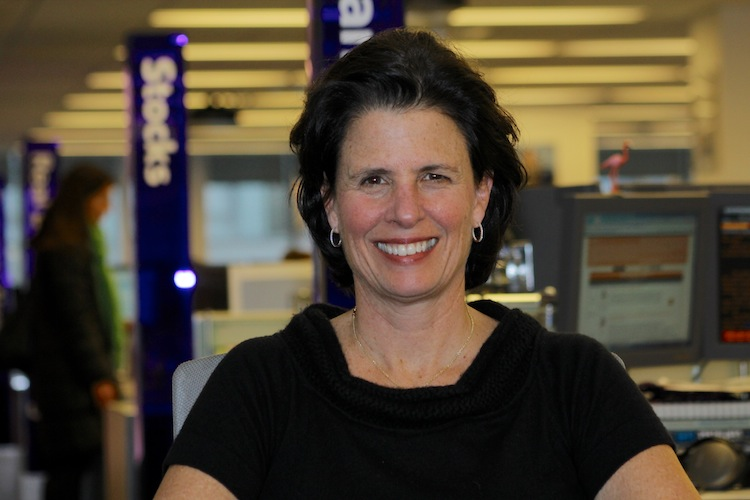

Laurie Hays is an American journalist and media executive who was the highest ranking woman at Bloomberg News until 2015 when she was passed over for the top editorial post succeeding founder Matt Winkler. The position went to John Micklethwait, then editor-in-chief of The Economist, whose appointment was announced in early December 2014 by Mike Bloomberg. At Bloomberg News Hays oversaw numerous award winning stories including Bloomberg's first Pulitzer Prize for corporate tax avoidance.

Before joining Bloomberg News in 2008, Hays worked at The Wall Street Journal for 23 years She covered the breakup of the Soviet Union as Moscow correspondent. She held numerous positions including national news editor, and deputy managing editor. She oversaw a team that won a 2003 Pulitzer Prize in Explanatory Reporting on corporate corruption scandals.

Hays has served on numerous non profit journalism boards and currently is as a director on the Craig Newmark School of Journalism CUNY Foundation Board.

== Early life ==
Hays was raised in Greenwich, Connecticut. Her father Richard M. Hays was a distinguished Nephrologist, Professor of Medicine and physician at Albert Einstein College of Medicine. Her Mother Susan Pope Hays was a nurse, model and antiques collector. Hays attended Phillips Exeter Academy and wrote for The Exonian, becoming the first female editor at the weekly student newspaper. Hays graduated from Harvard in 1979 with an honors degree in American history, and she wrote for The Harvard Crimson during college.

After college, Hays took a job with the New Orleans States-Item, which merged a year later with the New Orleans Times-Picayune. Her work covered the Plaquemines and St. Bernard parishes, where she covered murder and politics, including stories on political boss Leander Perez. In 1983, Hays was hired as a reporter for The News Journal in Wilmington.

Hays married journalist and writer Fen Montaigne in 1982.
