= John T. Lenahan =

American politician (1852–1920)

John Thomas Lenahan
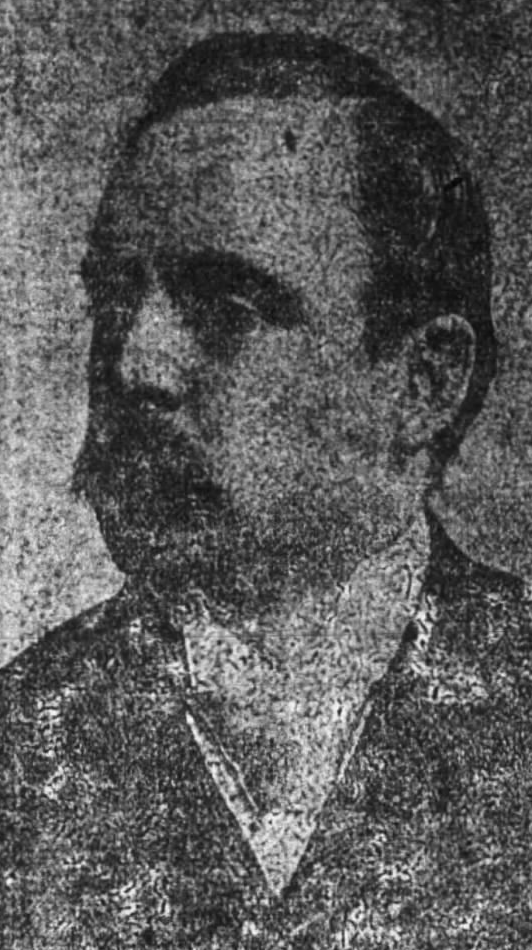

Member of the U.S. House of Representatives from Pennsylvania's 11th district
- In office March 4, 1907 – March 3, 1909
- Preceded by: Henry Wilbur Palmer
- Succeeded by: Henry Wilbur Palmer

Personal details
- Born: November 15, 1852 Jenkins Township, Pennsylvania
- Died: April 28, 1920 (aged 67) Wilkes-Barre, Pennsylvania
- Party: Democratic

John Thomas Lenahan (November 15, 1852 – April 28, 1920) was a Democratic member of the U.S. House of Representatives from Pennsylvania.

== Biography ==
John T. Lenahan was born in Jenkins Township, Pennsylvania. He graduated from Villanova College in 1870. He studied law at the University of Pennsylvania in Philadelphia, Pennsylvania. He was admitted to the bar in 1873 and commenced practice in Wilkes-Barre, Pennsylvania. He was a delegate to the Democratic National Conventions in 1892 and 1896.

Lenahan was elected as a Democrat to the Sixtieth Congress. He was not a candidate for renomination in 1908. He resumed the practice of law, and died in Wilkes-Barre. Interment in St. Mary's Cemetery.

== Sources ==
- United States Congress. "John T. Lenahan (id: L000239)". Biographical Directory of the United States Congress.
- The Political Graveyard

U.S. House of Representatives
Preceded by Henry W. Palmer	Member of the U.S. House of Representatives from Pennsylvania's 11th congressional district 1907–1909	Succeeded by Henry W. Palmer
