= Willowdale State Forest =

Protected area in Massachusetts, United States

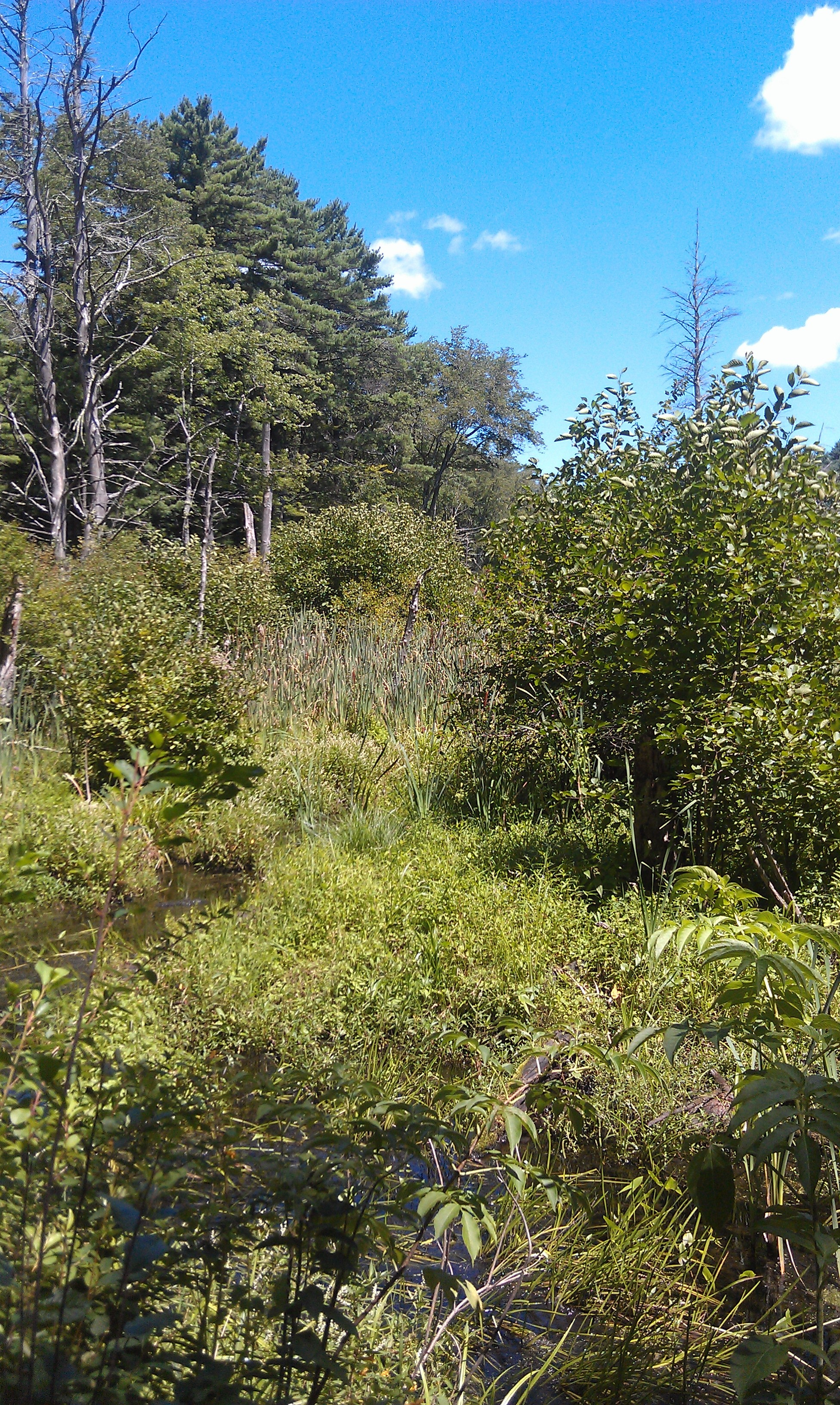
- A view from the trail at Willowdale State Forest

- Location within Massachusetts Location within the United States
- Location: Ipswich, Topsfield and Boxford, Massachusetts, United States
- Coordinates: 42°40′13″N 70°57′20″W
- Area: 2,491 acres (1,008 ha)
- Elevation: 62 ft (19 m)
- Administrator: Massachusetts Department of Conservation and Recreation
- Website: Official website

Willowdale State Forest is a Massachusetts state forest located in the towns of Hamilton, Topsfield, and Boxford. The area is managed by the Massachusetts Department of Conservation and Recreation. The forest's eastern portion sits on the Ipswich River across from Bradley Palmer State Park.

== Activities and amenities ==
The forest's 40 miles (64 km) of trails, which include a section of the Bay Circuit Trail, are used for walking, hiking, mountain biking, horseback riding, and cross-country skiing. The 100-acre (40 ha) Hood Pond offers opportunities for canoeing and fishing. Restricted hunting is available in the portion of the forest west of U.S. Route 1.
