= Bradley Palmer State Park =

Historic site in Topsfield, Massachusetts

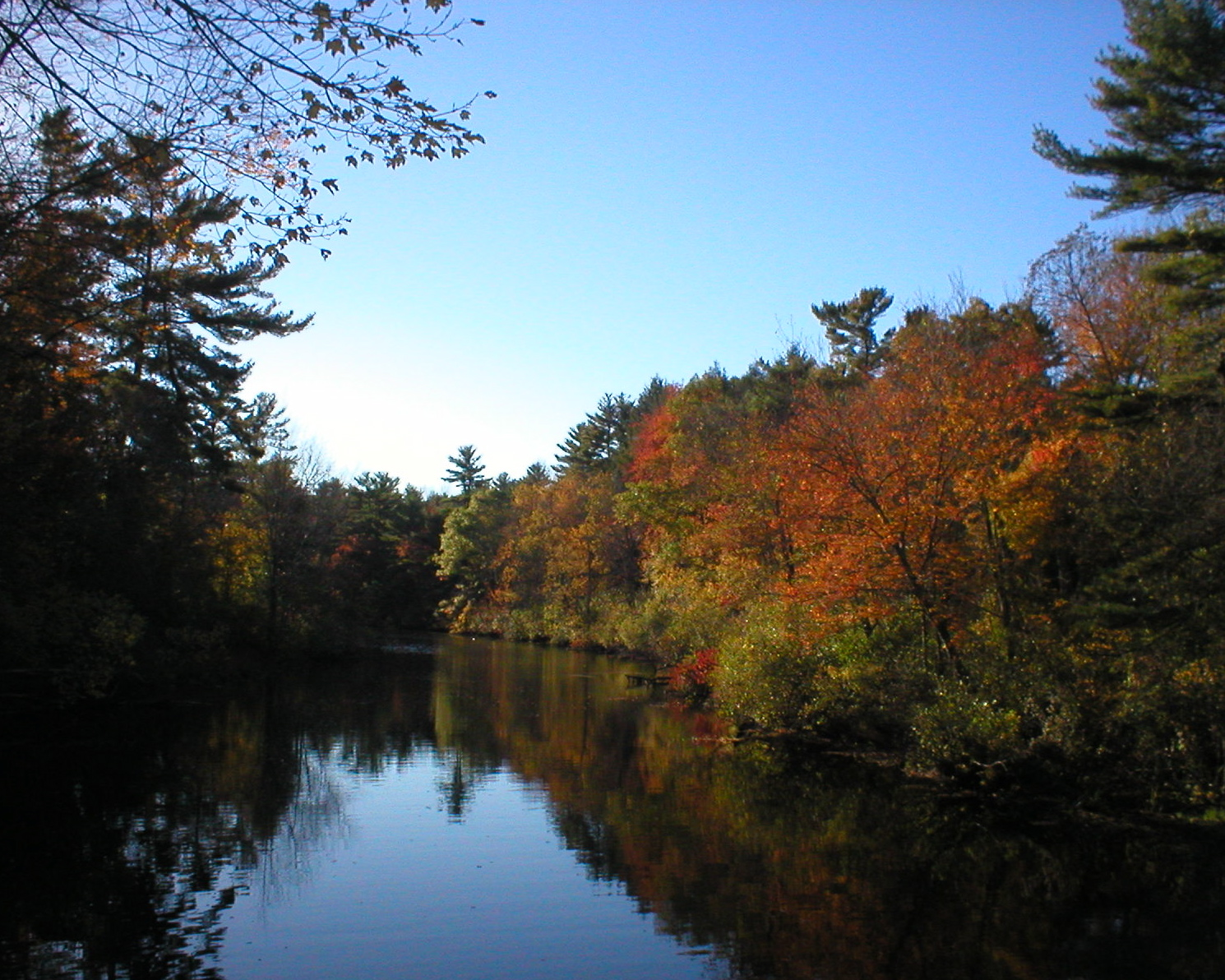
- Ipswich River from the park's footbridge

- Location within Massachusetts Location within the United States
- Interactive map of Bradley Palmer State Park
- Location: Topsfield, Massachusetts and Hamilton, Massachusetts, United States
- Coordinates: 42°39′20″N 70°53′59″W
- Area: 736 acres (298 ha)
- Elevation: 197 ft (60 m)
- Administrator: Massachusetts Department of Conservation and Recreation
- Website: Official website

Bradley Palmer State Park is a public recreation area covering 736 acres (298 ha) on the Ipswich River in the towns of Hamilton and Topsfield, Massachusetts. The state park was once the estate of noted attorney Bradley Palmer. In addition to an extensive system of multi-use trails, the park features Palmer's restored Willowdale Mansion. The mansion is now home to Willowdale Estate, a premier event venue. Bordered on the north by the Ipswich River and Willowdale State Forest, the park is managed by the Department of Conservation and Recreation.

== History ==
The park is the former estate of Bradley Palmer, an attorney of the early 20th century. Originally, the dense forest that composes the modern park would have been farmland, which Palmer both cultivated, and used to build his impressive steeplechase. During Palmer's lifetime, Palmer hosted regular horse races for the Myopia Hunt Club. Palmer was an active member in the Topsfield community, owning approximately 10,000 acres in Topsfield, Hamilton, and Wenham areas. Palmer often rode his favorite horse, Rifle, around the towns, smoking a cigar sticking straight out of a pipe. Near the end of his life (between 1937 until 1944), Palmer willed his lands "“to the people of Massachusetts as a place to enjoy the peace and beauty of river, woods, fields, and hills”.

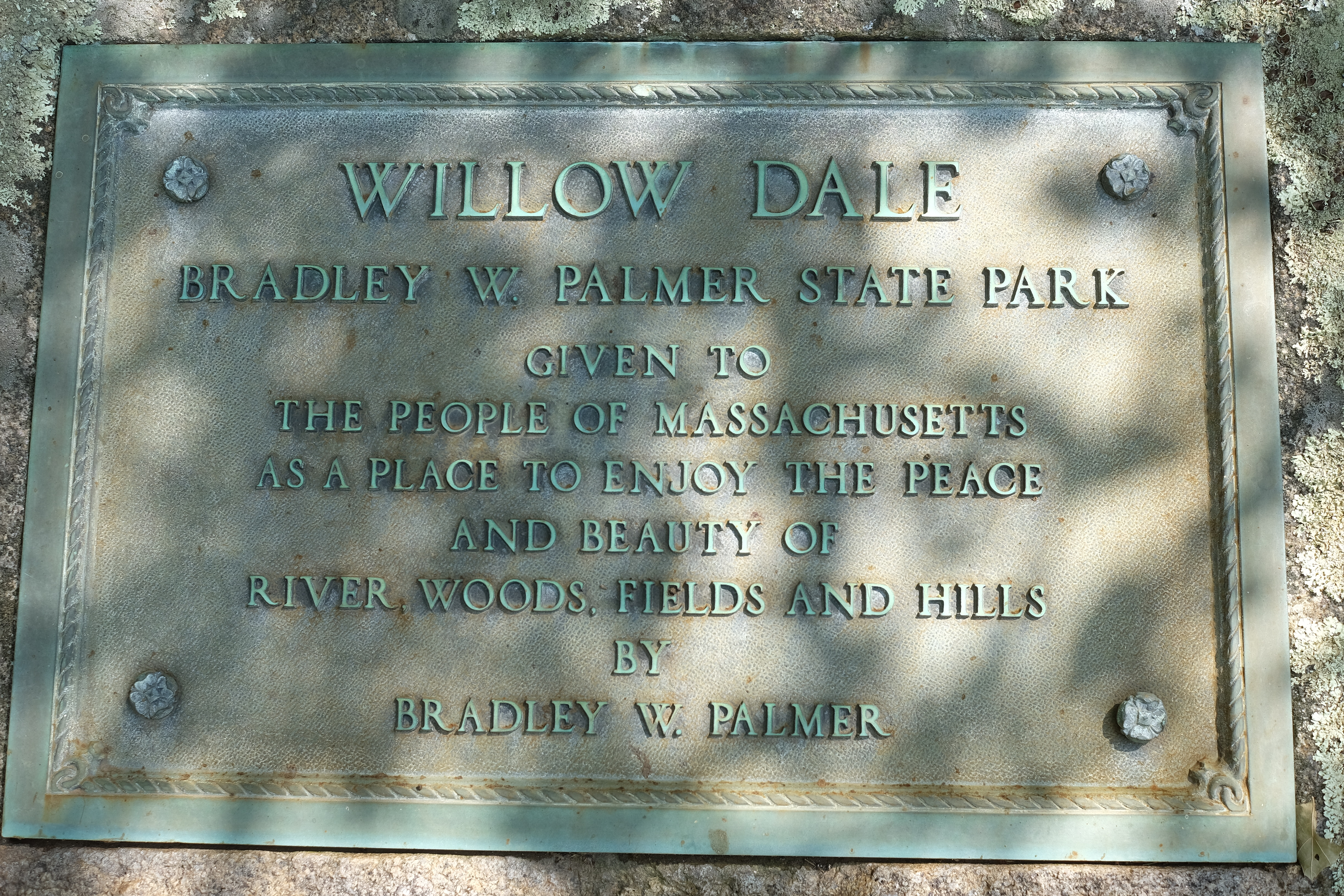
Plaque at entrance to Bradley Palmer State Park

Training center

During the 1960s and '70s the park was the location of the Massachusetts Civil Defense Training Academy. The academy utilized the rooms of the Willowdale Estate as classrooms, dormitory and mess facilities. A disaster town was constructed in a clearing apx. One-quarter mile east of the mansion consisted of a burn house, five story rappelling tower, shed class rooms and four collapse building simulators.

== Natural features ==
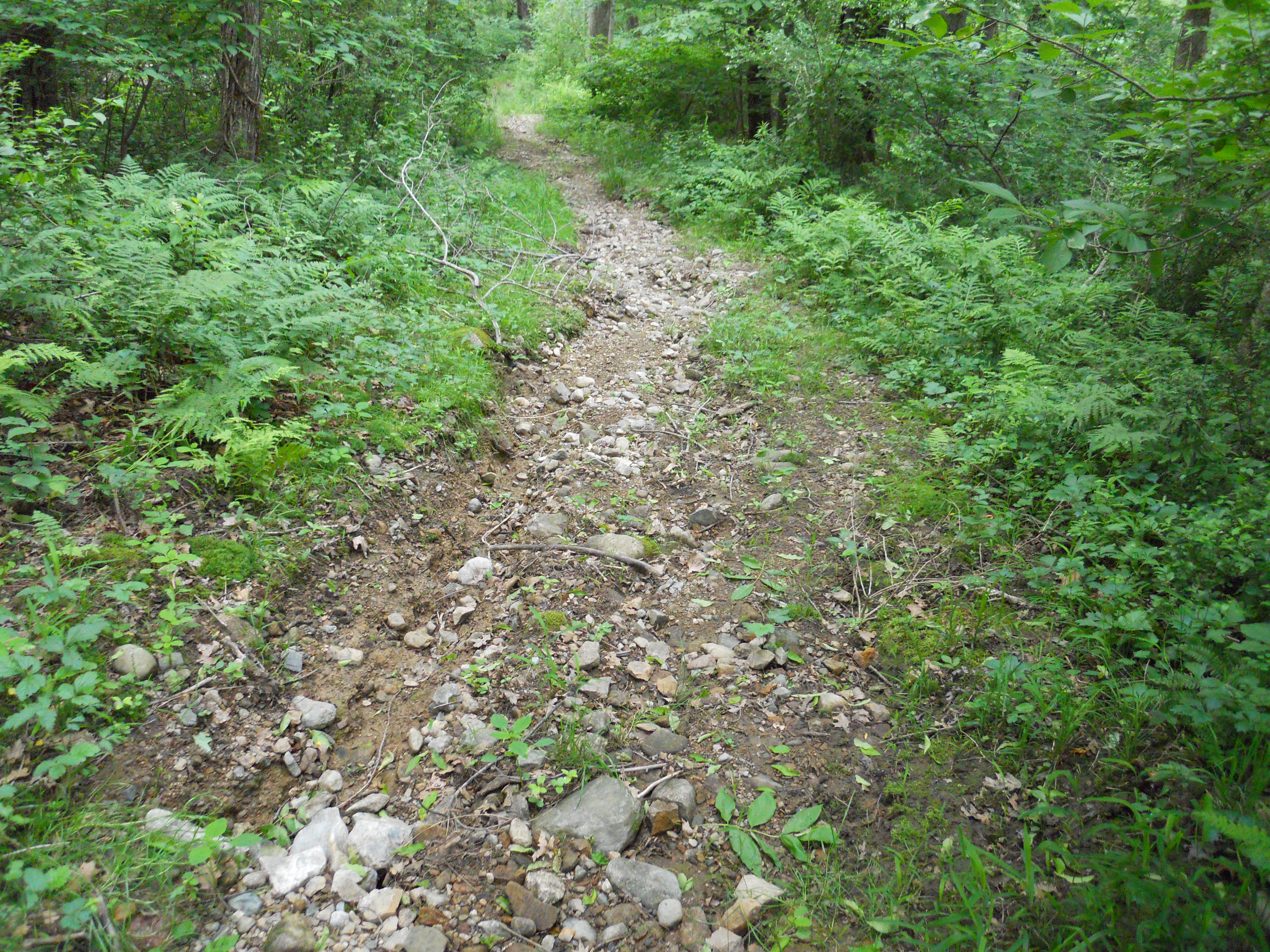
Erosional trail damage in the park

The park features meadows where blueberries can be picked, equestrian runs, stands of climax white pine and hemlock, and a central paved road lined with white pine and in one stretch of a few hundred yards of rhododendron and mountain laurel thickets. On its northeast edge, the park has contiguous access to the ruins of Willowdale Mill, a former textile mill.

== Activities and amenities ==
Mansion

The Bradley Palmer mansion, a stone manse built in the Craftsman and Jacobean Revival styles. During Palmer's life, the mansion hosted many events such as Palmer's Harvard class reunions, business and governmental meetings, and races for the nearby Myopia Hunt Club, of which Palmer was a member. Between 1997 and 2007, the building was restored by the Forsythe-Fandetti family as part of the state's historic curatorship program. It opened in 2007 under the name Willowdale Estate and may now be rented for a variety of different events including weddings and corporate occasions. Willowdale Estate also hosts a variety of public events each year including historical tours and holiday events.

Trails

Park trails are used for walking, hiking, mountain biking, horseback riding, and cross-country skiing. The park is crossed by the Bay Circuit Trail and Discover Hamilton Trail. To the park's north, trails in Willowdale State Forest can be reached via footbridge over the Ipswich River.

The park is used as the home field for meets of the Masconomet Regional High School cross-country team. In the autumn, the neighboring horse farms conduct fox hunts (they bring their own fox). Sometimes equestrian meets are held there. Numerous hurdles are in evidence in the equestrian runs, which are periodically mowed. Horses brought in by trailer at will may usually be seen on any non-winter day, more so toward the autumn.

Other

The park also offers picnicking, canoeing, and fishing in addition to handicapped-accessible wading pool and restrooms. The former barn and garage facilities have been turned into a headquarters and maintenance center. Also on the grounds is a colonial farmhouse currently being restored and a caretaker's house.
