= Henry W. Palmer =

American politician (1839–1913)

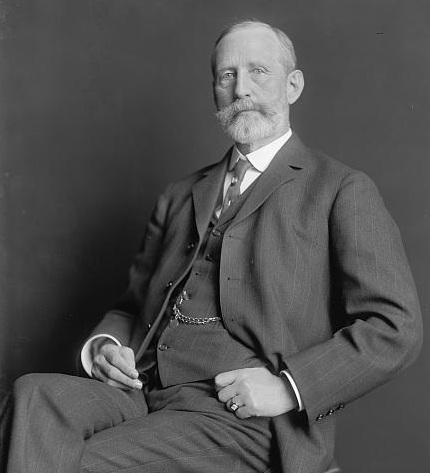
Henry Wilbur Palmer

Henry Wilbur Palmer (July 10, 1839 – February 15, 1913) was a Republican member of the U.S. House of Representatives from Pennsylvania. Henry Palmer was the father of Bradley Palmer, a Boston lawyer known for his involvement with United Fruit Company, Gillette, and ITT Corporation.

== Early life ==
Henry W. Palmer was born in Clifford Township, Pennsylvania on July 10, 1839 to Gideon Palmer, who moved to Pennsylvania from Massachusetts in 1836. He attended Wyoming Seminary in Kingston, Pennsylvania, and Fort Edward Institute in Fort Edward, New York. He graduated from the National Law School in Poughkeepsie, New York, in 1860.

== Career ==
In 1861 he was admitted to the bar in Peekskill, New York, and in Wilkes-Barre, Pennsylvania, in 1861. He served as prothonotary's clerk in 1861, and served in the pay department of the Union Army at New Orleans in 1862 and 1863. He was a member of the constitutional convention of Pennsylvania in 1872 and 1873, and served as attorney general of the State in 1879 through 1883.

Palmer was elected as a Republican to the Fifty-seventh, Fifty-eighth, and Fifty-ninth Congresses. He was one of the managers appointed by the United States House of Representatives in 1905 to conduct the impeachment proceedings against Charles Swayne, judge of the United States Court for the Northern District of Florida. He was again elected to the Sixty-first Congress. He practiced law until his death in Wilkes-Barre on February 15, 1913. He was interred in Hollenback Cemetery.

== Family ==
Henry Palmer married Ellen Webster in September 1861. Ellen W. Palmer was an important social reformer of the late nineteenth century, particularly known for her work in securing fair pay for breaker boys in Luzerne County, Pennsylvania.

Palmer had six children, two sons and four daughters. Their eldest son, Bradley Palmer, was an important Boston lawyer who helped form United Fruit Company, Gillette, and ITT Corporation. He served on the board of directors for these and many other companies as well as representing President Woodrow Wilson at the Paris Peace Conference.

== Sources ==
- United States Congress. "Henry W. Palmer (id: P000040)". Biographical Directory of the United States Congress.
- The Political Graveyard
- Ellen W. Palmer Archived December 15, 2018, at the Wayback Machine
- Bradley Palmer

U.S. House of Representatives
Preceded by Stanley W. Davenport	Member of the U.S. House of Representatives from Pennsylvania's 12th congressional district 1901–1903	Succeeded by George R. Patterson
Preceded by William Connell	Member of the U.S. House of Representatives from Pennsylvania's 11th congressional district 1903–1907	Succeeded by John T. Lenahan
Preceded by John T. Lenahan	Member of the U.S. House of Representatives from Pennsylvania's 11th congressional district 1909–1911	Succeeded by Charles C. Bowman
Legal offices
Preceded by George Lear	Attorney General of Pennsylvania; 1879–1883	Succeeded by Lewis C. Cassidy
