= Willowdale, Halifax, Nova Scotia =

Coordinates: 44°39′38.36″N 63°28′53.37″W

Willowdale in Nova Scotia

Willowdale is a subdivision in the community of Cole Harbour in the Canadian province of Nova Scotia, located in the Halifax Regional Municipality.
