= Wenham =

Wenham can refer to:

== Locality ==
- Wenham, Massachusetts, town in Essex County, Massachusetts, United States
  - Wenham Historic District, historic district in Wenham, Massachusetts
  - Hamilton/Wenham (MBTA station), Massachusetts Bay Commuter Railroad Company passenger station
  - Wenham Lake, lake near Wenham, Massachusetts
    - Wenham Lake Ice Company
- Wenham, village in Carver, Massachusetts, now East Carver
- Wenham Magna, Wenham Parva, Little Wenham, villages in the Babergh district of Suffolk, England

== People ==
- Alex Wenham, English stone carver
- Alison Wenham OBE, founder of the Association of Independent Music, later CEO of World Independent Networks
- Brian Wenham, controller of BBC Two from 1978 until 1982
- David Wenham (1965–), Australian actor
- David Wenham (theologian) (1945–), British theologian, son of John Wenham
- Francis Herbert Wenham (1824–1908), British engineer and inventor
- Gordon Wenham (1943–), English theologian
- Kelly Wenham (1983–), English actress
- Jane Wenham (alleged witch) (?–1730), subject of what is commonly but erroneously regarded as the last witch trial in England
- Leslie Peter Wenham (1911–1990), British archaeologist, historian and professor
- Jane Wenham (actress) (1927–2018), English actress
- John Wenham (1913–1996), Anglican bible scholar, father of the theologian David Wenham
- Stuart Wenham, (1957–2017), Australian scientist
- Zoë Wenham, (1994-), British racing driver

== Other ==
- "The Witch of Wenham", 1877 poem by John Greenleaf Whittier (1807–1892)
