= Claflin family =

Scottish American family

The Claflin family are a Scottish American family of 17th century New England origins. The descendants of Robert Maclachlan of Wenham, Massachusetts, a Scottish soldier and prisoner of war from the Battle of Dunbar (1650) assumed to have belonged to the Clan Maclachlan, and his wife Joanna Warner, members of the family have distinguished themselves in various occupations and regions of the United States.

== Revolutionary War ==
Although not of great means in the early generations, a considerable number of the Claflin family, twenty four in all, fought as militiamen and soldiers on the American side in the American Revolutionary War, including at Lexington and Concord (many), the Battle of Bunker Hill (several), the Battle of White Plains (one), and finally in the Saratoga campaign (two, possibly more), with Nathaniel Claflin being present at the Surrender of Burgoyne. Their length of service varied from only eight days to several months and years, with a few serving as junior officers. In addition, three more members served as drummers, and two more as pipers.

Earlier in the French and Indian War several Claflins joined in the Crown Point Expedition.

== People ==
- Adelaide Avery Claflin, suffragist, born Adelaide Avery
- Avery Claflin, composer and banker
- Bruce Claflin, businessman
- Edith Claflin, linguist and scholar
- Horace Brigham Claflin, businessman, H.B. Claflin & Company
- Increase Claflin, pioneer, first white settler of Door County, Wisconsin
- Ira W. Claflin, Civil War officer
- Lee Claflin, philanthropist
- Tennessee Celeste Claflin, suffragist, broker, and rumoured mistress of Cornelius Vanderbilt. Later became Lady Cook, Viscountess of Montserrat.
- Victoria Woodhull née Claflin, suffragist, broker, and presidential candidate. Subject of Onward Victoria.
- William Claflin, Governor of Massachusetts and philanthropist
- William Henry Claflin Jr., businessman and amateur archaeologist

Female line:

- Harvey Claflin Mansfield Jr., Professor of Government at Harvard University. Grandmother was Adelaide Claflin daughter of Harvey Thatcher Claflin.

== Places and institutions ==
- Adams Claflin House
- Boston University, co-founded by Lee Claflin, charter signed by son William Claflin
- Claflin, Kansas
- Claflin-Richards House, home of Robert Mackclothlan
- Claflin School
- Claflin University, land donated by William and Lee Claflin
- Woodhull & Claflin's Weekly

== See also ==
- Robert Claflin Rusack, Episcopal Bishop of Los Angeles
- Claflin-Norrish House
- Claflin doctrine

== External ==
- Claflin Family Association
