= Claflin–Richards House =

Historic house in Massachusetts, United States

Coordinates: 42.6087°N 70.8879°W

- U.S. National Register of Historic Places
- U.S. Historic district – Contributing property
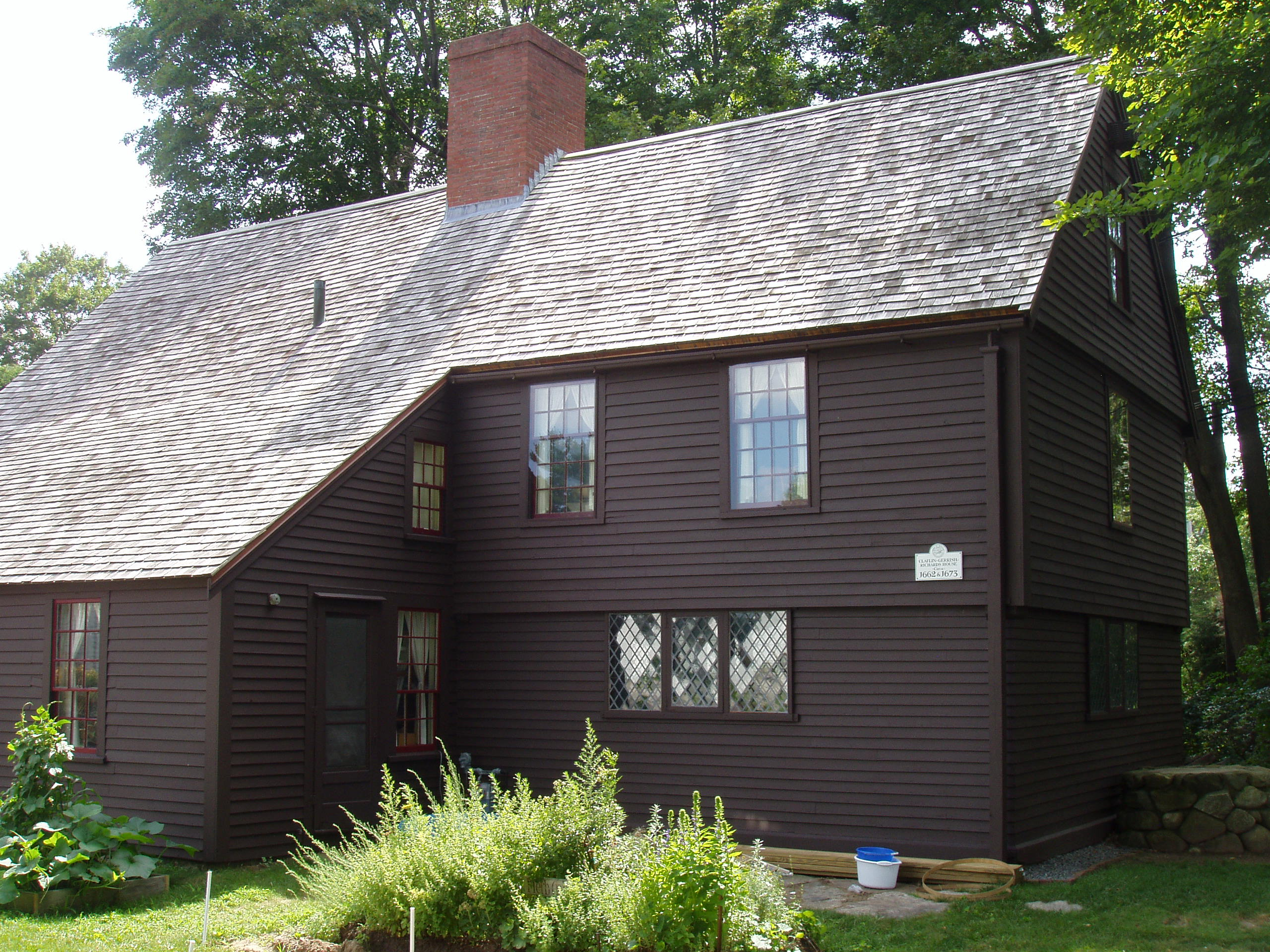
- Front view

- Location within Massachusetts Location within the United States
- Location: 132 Main St; Wenham, Massachusetts
- Part of: Wenham Historic District (ID73000852)
- NRHP reference No.: 73000853

Significant dates
- Added to NRHP: April 3, 1973
- Designated CP: April 3, 1973

The Claflin–Richards House, also known as the Claflin–Gerrish–Richards House, is a historic First Period house located at 132 Main Street, Wenham, Massachusetts. It is now part of the nonprofit Wenham Museum and may be toured by appointment (regular tour hours are Tuesday–Friday at 11:00am and 2:00pm and Saturday & Sunday at 11:30am, 1:30pm and 2:30pm).

The oldest room in the Claflin–Gerrish-Richards House was constructed in 1662, with additions in circa 1672, 1730, and multiple renovations made in the 19th and 20th centuries. The ground floor of the house, which includes two rooms interpreted to appear as they may have in the 17th century, is open to the public for self-guided tours and can be accessed any time during regular hours, with the exception of school groups using it for hands-on activities during field trips. Everything in the rooms is touchable.

The house was purchased by the Wenham Village Improvement Society (WVIS) in 1921.

The house was listed on the National Register of Historic Places in 1973, and included in the Wenham Historic District in that year.

== See also ==
- Claflin family
- List of historic houses in Massachusetts
- National Register of Historic Places listings in Essex County, Massachusetts
