= Wenham Lake =

Lake in Massachusetts, United States

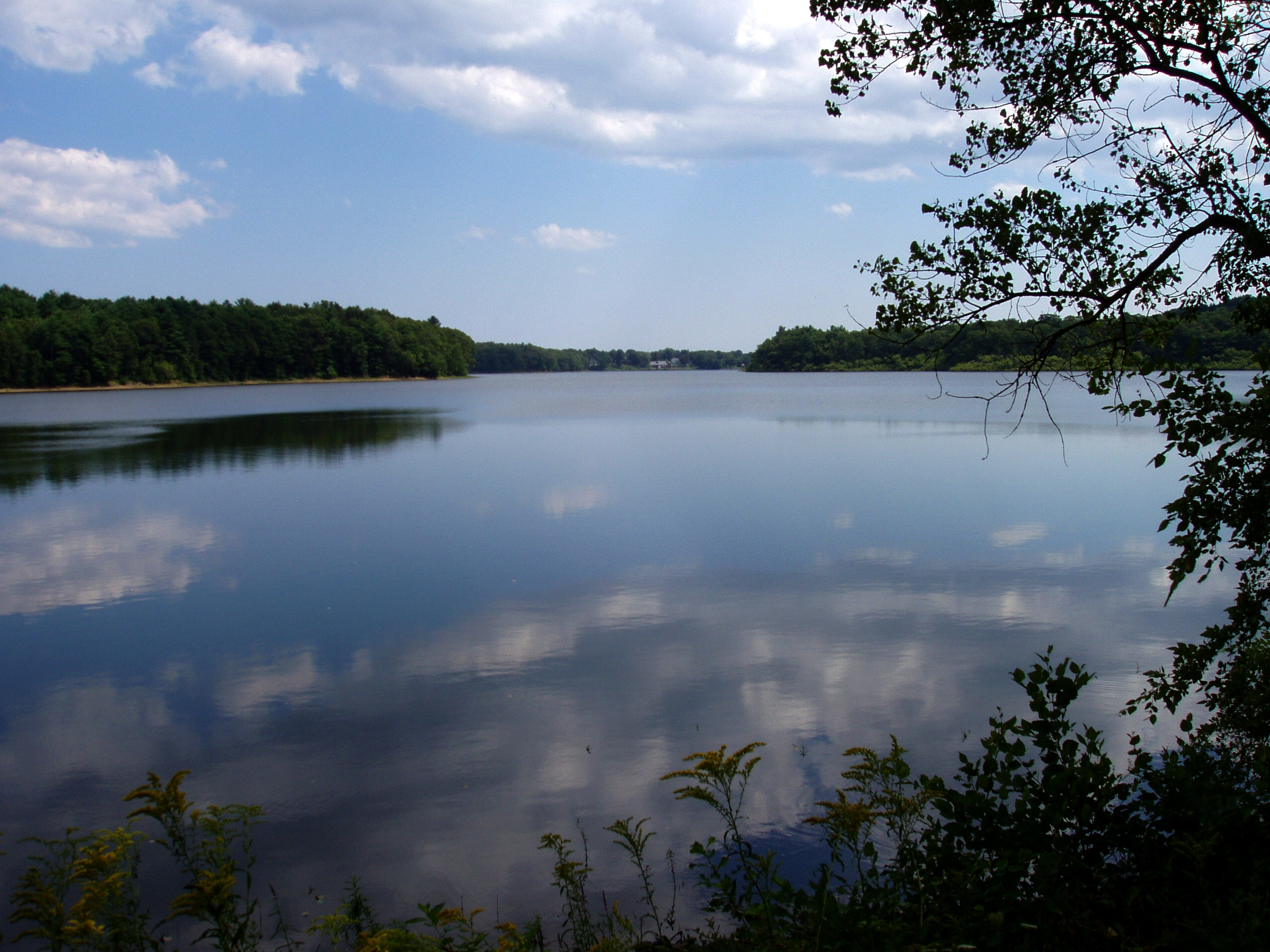

- Location within Massachusetts Location within the United States

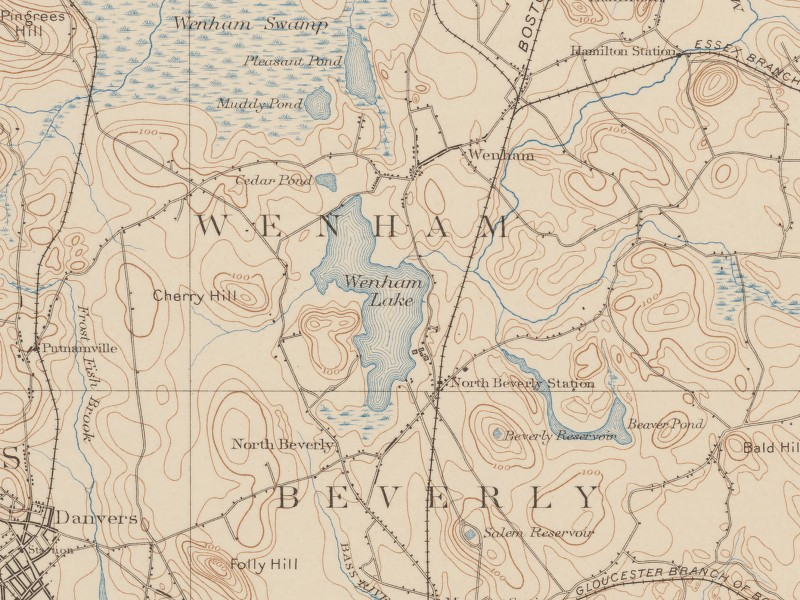
- Map of Wenham Lake, 1897, showing the now commuter rail.
- Location: Beverly / Wenham, Massachusetts, U.S.
- Coordinates: 42°35′34.85″N 70°53′35.72″W
- Basin countries: United States
- Surface elevation: 32 ft (9.8 m)

Wenham Lake is a 224-acre body of water located in Wenham and Beverly towns, Essex County, Massachusetts.The lake receives water from the water table, a system of streams, the Putnamville Reservoir (via pipeline), and the Ipswich River (via pumping). In the 19th century, the lake was an important source of ice for export, especially to Britain. Wenham Lake is now a reservoir for the Salem and Beverly Water Supply Board.

== Hydrology ==
The lake receives water from the water table and from nearby streams. These flow from Beaver Pond, Norwood Pond and Longham Reservoir through the fields and woods to the east of the lake. The streams are controlled waterways. Drainage into the lake is through a pipe running beneath Route 1A in the vicinity of the golf course to the north of the lake. To the west, near Beverly Regional Airport water enters the lake through deeply cut ravines in glacial features forested with hemlock and pine.

== History ==
Wenham Lake lies in the traditional lands of the Agawam people. The Agwam people recognised tribal ownership of the eastern part of what is now Essex County, Massachusetts. Those lands were ceded to the English in a quitclaim deed made by Chief Masconomet to John Winthrop the Younger. The deed was part of an amalgamation arrangement between remaining Agawam (whose numbers had markedly declined in the 1600s due to disease) and the English colonists of Charlestown, Massachusetts.

Wenham Lake is first found under the name "Great Pond", in the records of Salem, Massachusetts.The lake was the site of the murder of John Hoddy by John Williams. Hoddy's dog detained Williams until his arrest.

In 1638, Hugh Peters, the Puritan minister of the First Church of Salem, delivered a sermon to a small group of settlers on the shore of Wenham Lake. His sermon turned upon "Enon, near Salem, because there was much water there", a biblical reference to John 3:23. A small settlement nearby was thus named "Enon". The site of the sermon is marked by a stone with an engraved plaque. Enon was officially recognized by the General Court of Massachusetts on November 5, 1639. On May 10, 1643, Enon was incorporated and renamed Wenham. The lake was then named Wenham Lake.

In 1846, Benjamin Barker wrote Mornilva, or the outlaw of the forest: a romance of Lake Wenham. He described the lake's "clear, calm and placid waters, the beautiful and picturesque hills upon its borders, the beautiful evergreen of its dusky pine woods, and above all, the blue canopy of heaven, which overshadows it."

In 1877, the Quaker poet John Greenleaf Whittier wrote "The Witch of Wenham" which was set on the shores of Wenham Lake.

In the early 1900s, the ornithologist and hunter John Charles Phillips published, "Wenham Great Pond" recounting his time over ten years at Wenham Lake.

== Historic uses ==
=== Alewife fishing ===
In the early colonial times, alewife fishing was an important part of the local economy of Wenham. All the ponds in the region were interconnected through swamps and streams. Wenham Lake was a major alewife spawning ground. The alewife entered the lake via an outlet that emptied into the Miles River. The Miles river joins the Ipswich River giving a drop in elevation of about 34 feet (10 m). Alewife harvests continued to be important until the 19th century when dam construction on the Ipswich River and other streams ended the trade. The water of the lake was used to supply a mill via a dam. The outlet was later filled by the roadbed of Route 1A and the land used for the Lakeview Golf Course. Similarly, all the ponds have been protected as part of the drinking water supply.

=== Ice export ===
The transatlantic ice trade began in the 1840s. In 1844, the first ice cargo arrived in England from Wenham Lake. The ice of Wenham Lake became famous around the world. It was especially popular in Britain because of its purity and it is even said that Queen Victoria used the ice.

Ice from Wenham Lake was so popular that Norwegian ice exporters even renamed the Norwegian Lake Oppegård for a short while into Wenham Lake so that they could trade ice from this Norwegian lake as ice from Wenham Lake.

The Landers family, owners of the lake's first ice house, constructed a railroad spur for ice transport. One of its builders of the railroad was Grenville Mullen Dodge. He became a Major General in the Union Army and a central figure in the completion of the transcontinental railroad in 1869. The railroad spur became the Beverly-Newburyport commuter rail line. The roadbed of the railroad spur is visible directly behind the fifth hole of the Lakeview Golf Course.

A crew of 100 men and 30 to 40 horses was required to harvest the ice. The crew waited for a foot of black ice to form in the lake. Snow was swept off and snow-ice was scraped off by horse-drawn vehicles if necessary. Then, a horse-drawn cutting tool, the marker, scored a grid 2-3 inches deep forming 21-inch squares over two to three acres of ice. Men with saws cut along a line in one direction while men with ice spades knocked the blocks free from the strip. Another crew with ice hooks drew the ice along ramps onto platforms. Full platforms were slid onto sledges for transport to ice houses on the shore. An ice house was built of pine walls filled with sawdust to a thickness of 2 feet (61 cm). The blocks were packed in sawdust for transport, moved to a train in a special wagon and brought directly to a wharf in Boston. The blocks arrived in Boston within an hour of the cutting with no loss. Transport to Britain by ship lost about a third of the ice.

The ice business continued until at least 1912 when John C. Kelleher founded the Beverly Ice Company to harvest the lake's ice but its end came shortly afterwards.

== Modern uses ==
=== Water supply ===
Wenham Lake was set aside as a water reservoir for the Salem and Beverly Water Supply Board (established 1913). Wenham Lake has been integrated into the local water distribution system.

=== Recreation ===
The lake and its shores are not accessible to the general public. Facilities at the southern end are restricted by high fences and kept under surveillance by cameras. The shores of the lake are posted against trespassing. Stands of evergreens left on the knolls surrounding the lake are privately owned. Due to the isolation of the lake bed, migratory birds that were only seen in Wenham Swamp, a mile to the north, now rest and feed in larger numbers in the lake. Even though it is a non-trespassing area, most locals see it as one of the most consistent fishing places in northern Massachusetts.

== Environment ==
In 2001, the Wenham Lake Watershed Association discovered significant contamination of the lake with large deposits of fly ash dating from the 1950s and 1960s. These deposits totalled about 7,800 cubic yards and were more than 3 feet deep in some places. The origin of the fly ash was the nearby Vitale dump. The dump was an abandoned gravel and sand quarry that had illegally stored refuse from coal burned at the Salem Harbor Power Generating Station. In subsequent years the lake has been dredged and is monitored for its long-term health.

== See also ==
- Frederic Tudor
- Wenham Lake Ice Company
- Salem Beverly Waterway Canal

== References and further reading ==
- Some fly ash will remain in Wenham Lake, Marc Fortier, Staff writer, Salem News, November 14, 2003.
- Phillips, John C., Wenham Great Pond, Salem Massachusetts: Peabody Museum, 1938.
- Smith, Philip Chadwick Foster, Crystal Blocks of Yankee Coldness: The Development of the Massachusetts Ice Trade from Frederick Tudor to Wenham Lake, Wenham Historical Association, 1962.
- Weightman, Gavin, The Frozen Water Trade: A True Story, Hyperion, 2004. ISBN 0-7868-8640-4.
