= Skug River =

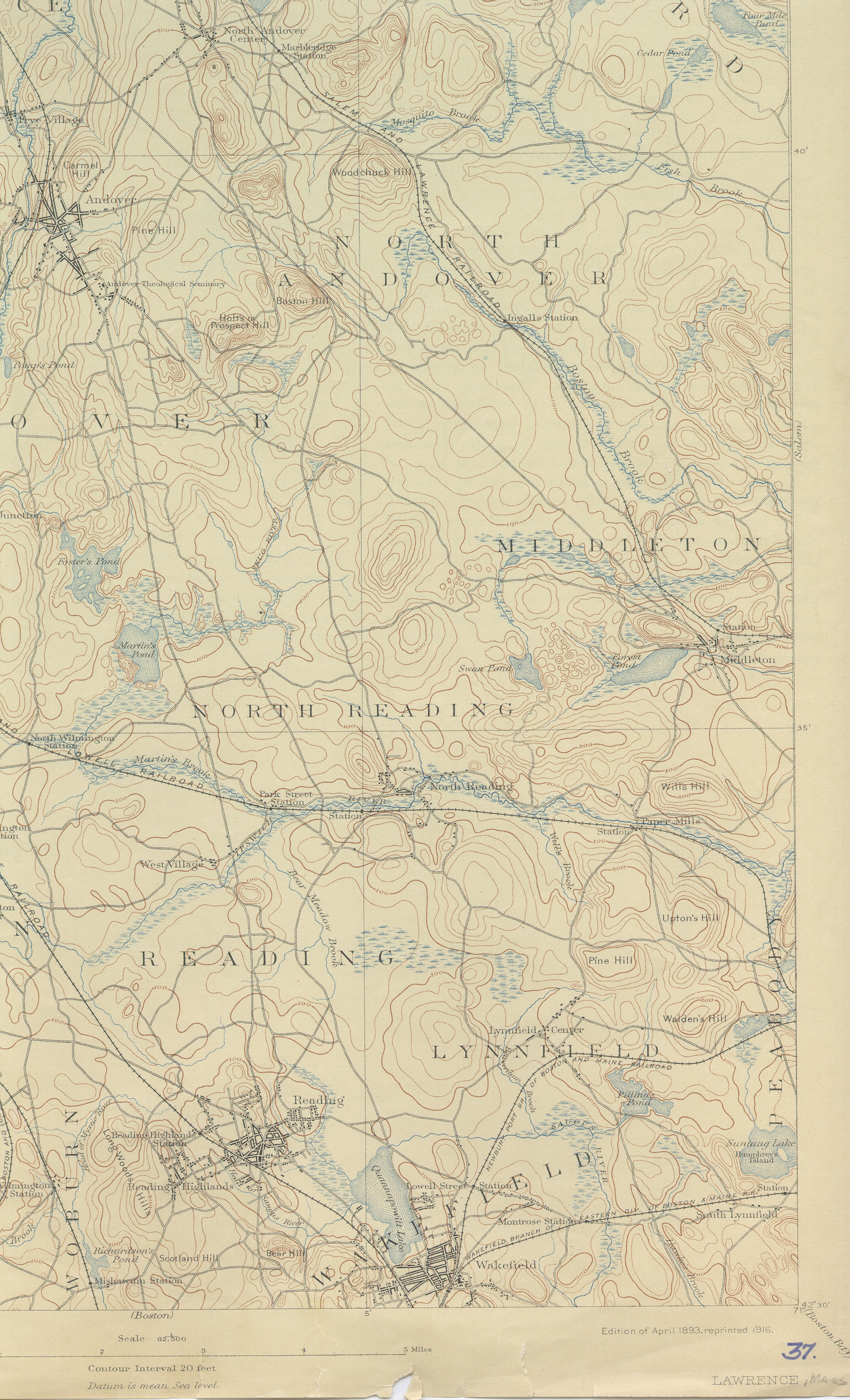
- Skug River watershed and environs, 1893.

Location
- Country: United States
- State: Massachusetts
- Counties: Essex and Middlesex

Physical characteristics
- Source
  - location: Harold Parker State Forest
  - coordinates: 42.635°N 71.098°W
- Mouth
  - location: Martin's Pond, North Reading, MA
  - coordinates: 42.5988°N 71.1238°W
- Length: 4.9 mi (7.9 km)

The Skug River is a 4.9-mile-long (7.9 km) river in North Andover, Andover, and North Reading, Massachusetts that constitutes part of the Ipswich River watershed. A popular etymology gives Skug as a misspelling of Skunk, however the name is more likely derived from the Abenaki skog, meaning snake.

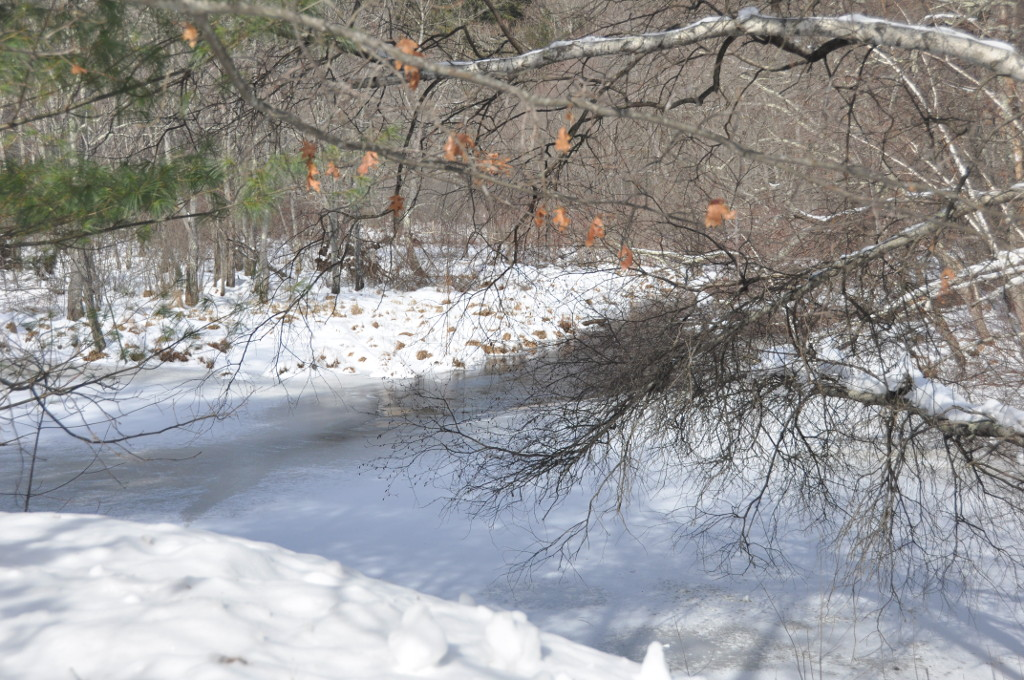
The nearly-frozen Skug River in Andover

The river arises from wetlands just south of Boston Hill in the Harold Parker State Forest, and flows mainly southwest to empty into Martin's Pond in North Reading. From there, Martin's Brook carries its waters onwards to the Ipswich River.

The river was dammed over 200 years ago for a sawmill and grist mill. Although the dam has since disappeared, the large stone walls of its millrace can still be seen in the Harold Parker State Forest and Andover Village Improvement Society Skug River Reservation, as can the old Jenkins Soapstone Quarry abutting the river.
