= Masconomet =

Masconomet may refer to:

- Chief Masconomet, a sagamore of the historical American native tribe of the Agawam
- Masconomet Regional High School in Essex County, Massachusetts serving Topsfield, Boxford and Middleton.
