= Academy at Penguin Hall =

The Academy at Penguin Hall
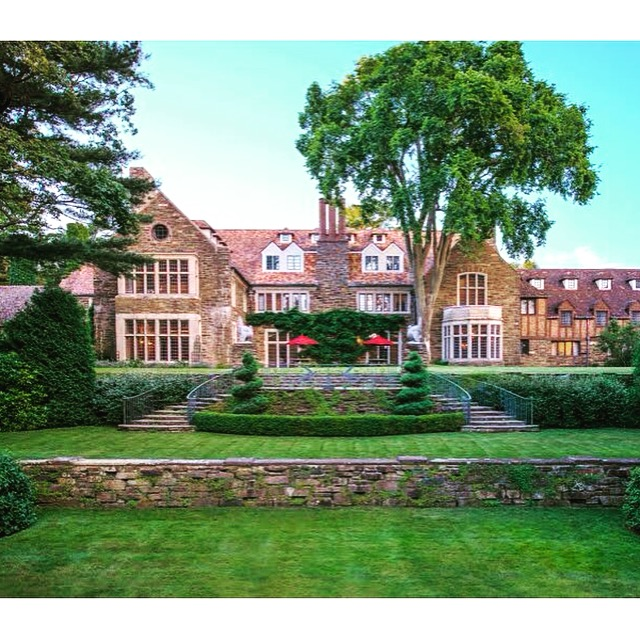

Location
- 36 Essex Street; Wenham, (Essex County), Massachusetts 01984; United States
- 42°35′36″N 70°50′50″W

Information
- Type: Private
- Established: 2015
- Closed: June 30, 2025
- CEEB code: 220007
- Head of school: Molly Martins
- Faculty: 25
- Grades: 9–12
- Enrollment: 64
- Average class size: 12
- Student to teacher ratio: 7:1
- Campus: Suburban
- Campus size: 50 acres (20 ha)
- Colors: Maroon and White
- Athletics conference: New England Preparatory School Athletic Council
- Mascot: Emperor Penguin
- Nickname: Penguin Hall, APH
- Accreditation: New England Association of Schools and Colleges
- Tuition: $42,800 (2024–25)
- Director of Admission: Annika McKenna
- Website: www.penguinhall.org

The Academy at Penguin Hall was an independent, college preparatory high school for young women, located in Wenham, Massachusetts, United States. The school was founded in 2015 and served young women, including the North Shore and the northern region of the Boston metropolitan area.

== History ==
The stone manor house that served as The Academy at Penguin Hall's home was originally built in 1929 by architect Harrie T. Lindeberg for Ruby Boyer Miller, a progressive-minded Detroit socialite. Her family owned the Burroughs Adding Machine. Miller summered at Penguin Hall, along with her children. In 1962, Penguin Hall was purchased by the Sisters of Notre Dame de Namur and became a home for educating women. Jim Mullen of Mullen Advertising purchased Penguin Hall in the late 1980s and used it as their headquarters until they relocated in 2009. The dedication ceremony for Penguin Hall was attended by Lt. Governor of Massachusetts Karyn Polito as well as State Senators Joan Lovely and Bruce Tarr, and State Representatives Bradford Hill and Lori Ehrlich.

On June 11, 2025, Academy at Penguin Hall filed for Chapter 11 bankruptcy protection as part of a plan to pause an auction to focus on fixing up its financial challenges.

On June 30, 2025, the Academy at Penguin Hall website was updated to announce the immediate closure of the school. Parents have since filed consumer complaints of fraud against the school. They allege the Academy collected tuition for the 25/26 school year and, following the closure, neglected to issue refunds for the prepaid tuition.

== Curriculum ==
The Academy at Penguin Hall used an Interdisciplinary curriculum. While The Academy's curriculum included core academic disciplines such as math and science, many other college-level courses were also on offer, such as Introduction to Russian History, Art and Politics, and Women in History.
