= Ipswich River Wildlife Sanctuary =

Protected area in Massachusetts

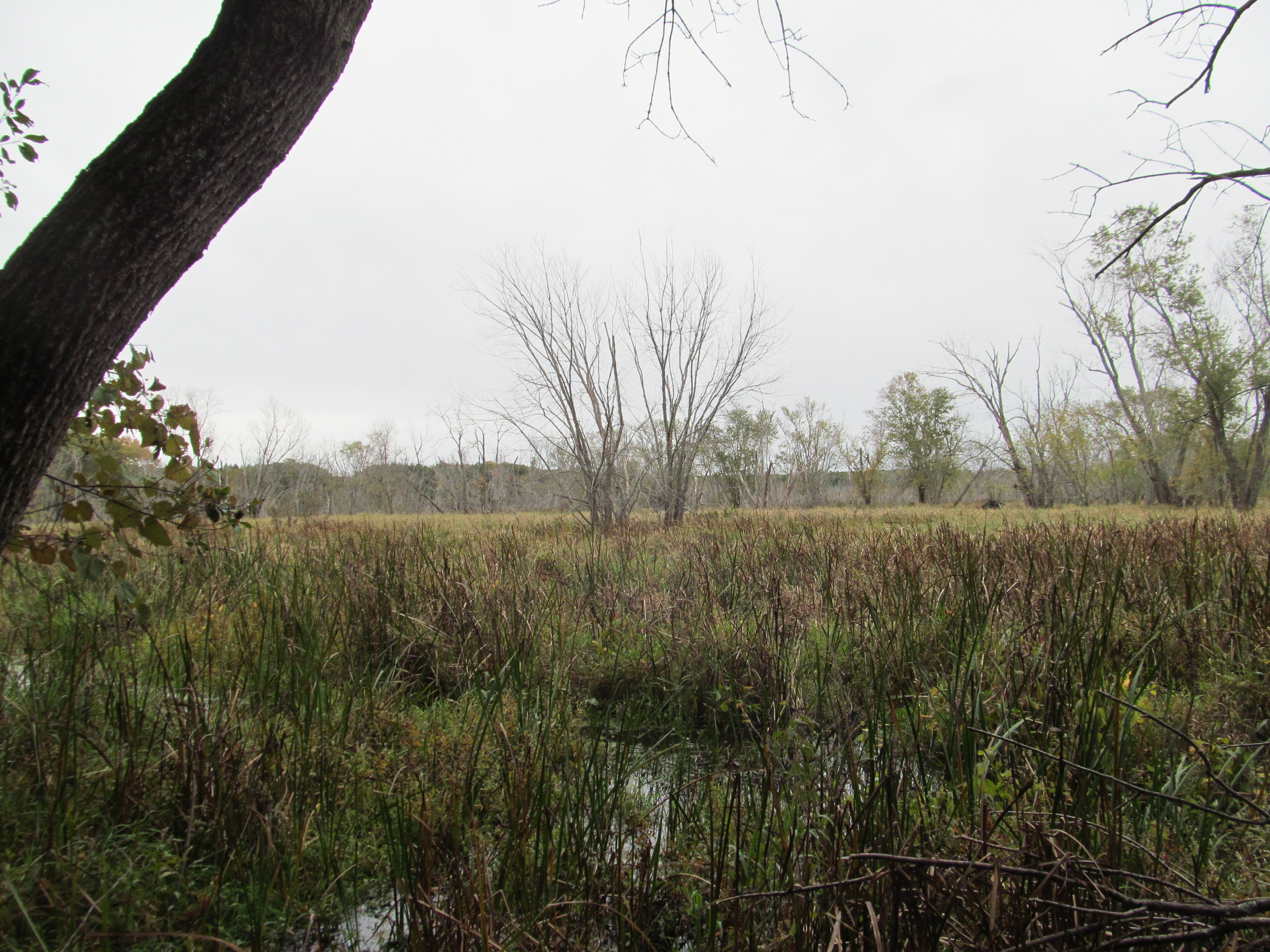
- Interactive map of Ipswich River Wildlife Sanctuary
- Type: wildlife sanctuary, nature center
- Location: 87 Perkins Row; Topsfield, Massachusetts, U.S.
- Coordinates: 42°37′28″N 70°54′34″W
- Area: 1,955 acres (791 ha)
- Created: 1951
- Operator: Massachusetts Audubon Society
- Hiking trails: 12 miles
- Website: Ipswich River Wildlife Sanctuary

The Ipswich River Wildlife Sanctuary, which is one of the Massachusetts Audubon Society’s largest wildlife sanctuaries, is located in Topsfield and Wenham, Massachusetts. Much of its 1,955-acre (7.91 km^{2}) landscape was created by a glacier 15,000 years ago.

== Features ==
The sanctuary features 12 miles (19 km) of interconnected trails wind through forests, meadows, and swamps, vernal pools, drumlins, and eskers. The Rockery Trail runs beside large rocks, exotic trees, and shrubs that belonged to an arboretum at Bradstreet Farm, parts of which were donated by owner Thomas Emerson Proctor. The Ipswich River runs for 8 miles (13 km) through the sanctuary, and Mass Audubon makes canoes available for members to rent.

The Sanctuary also offers summer camps and various nature programs for children and adults. There are donated benches scattered throughout the Sanctuary, one perched high on the South Esker Trail with wonderful views of birds on the water below. This bench was donated by Kathy Field and Alan Levites, both now deceased. The bench features an inscribed quote on the back: “It’s the end of all strain, It’s the joy in your heart,” attributed to Antonio Carlos Jobim. Nearby, one can feed chickadees, white breasted nuthatches and other birds by hand.

== History ==
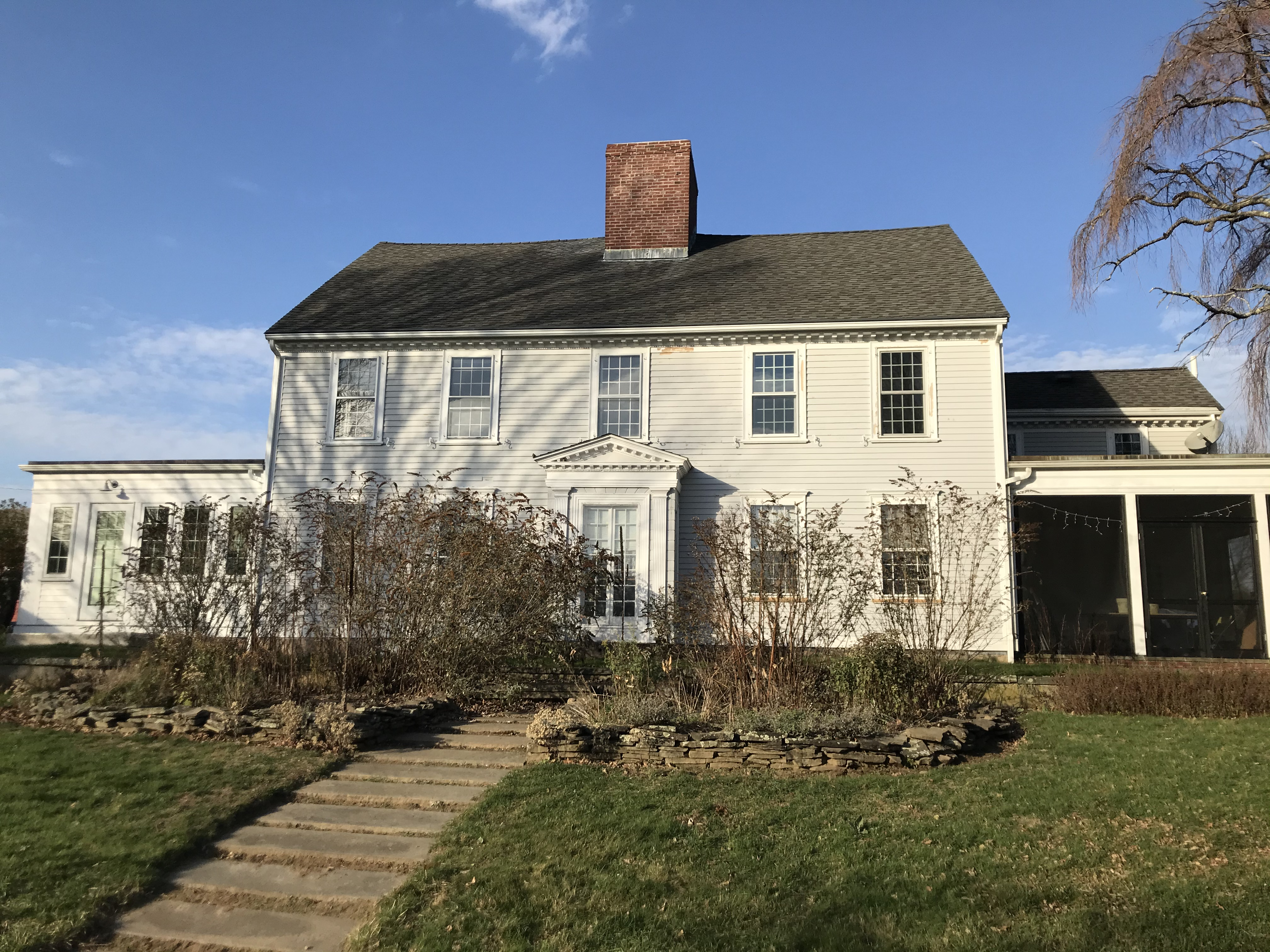
Captain Dudley Bradstreet House, now the Visitor Center

Thomas Emerson Proctor (1873–1949), a leather fortune heir, lived in the house of Captain Dudley Bradstreet (1765–1833) (currently the Audubon Visitor Center). He owned large pieces of land in Topsfield and other estates in the area.

Sources disagree about whether the sanctuary was bequeathed to the Massachusetts Audubon Society in Proctor's will or purchased by Mass Audubon using funds bequeathed by Annie Brown. The sanctuary was originally named the "Proctor Wildlife Sanctuary and Annie H. Brown Reservation".
