= Salem Beverly Waterway Canal =

Canal in Massachusetts, United States

Coordinates: 42°36′50″N 70°55′01″W

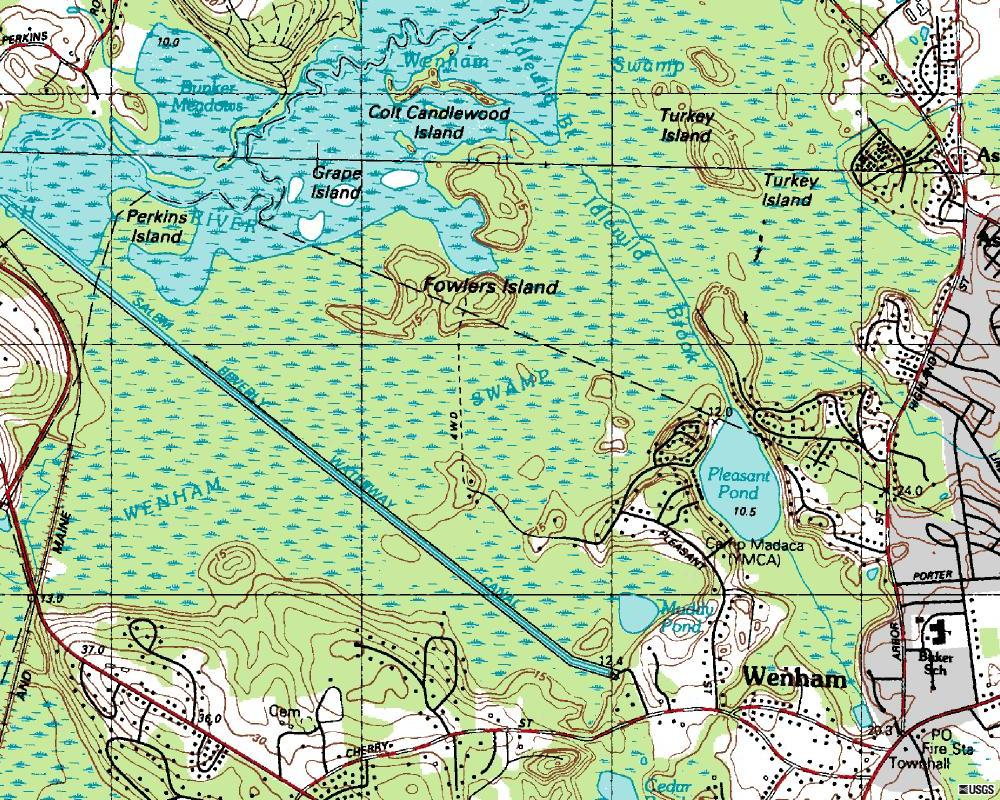
Map of the Salem Beverly Waterway Canal.

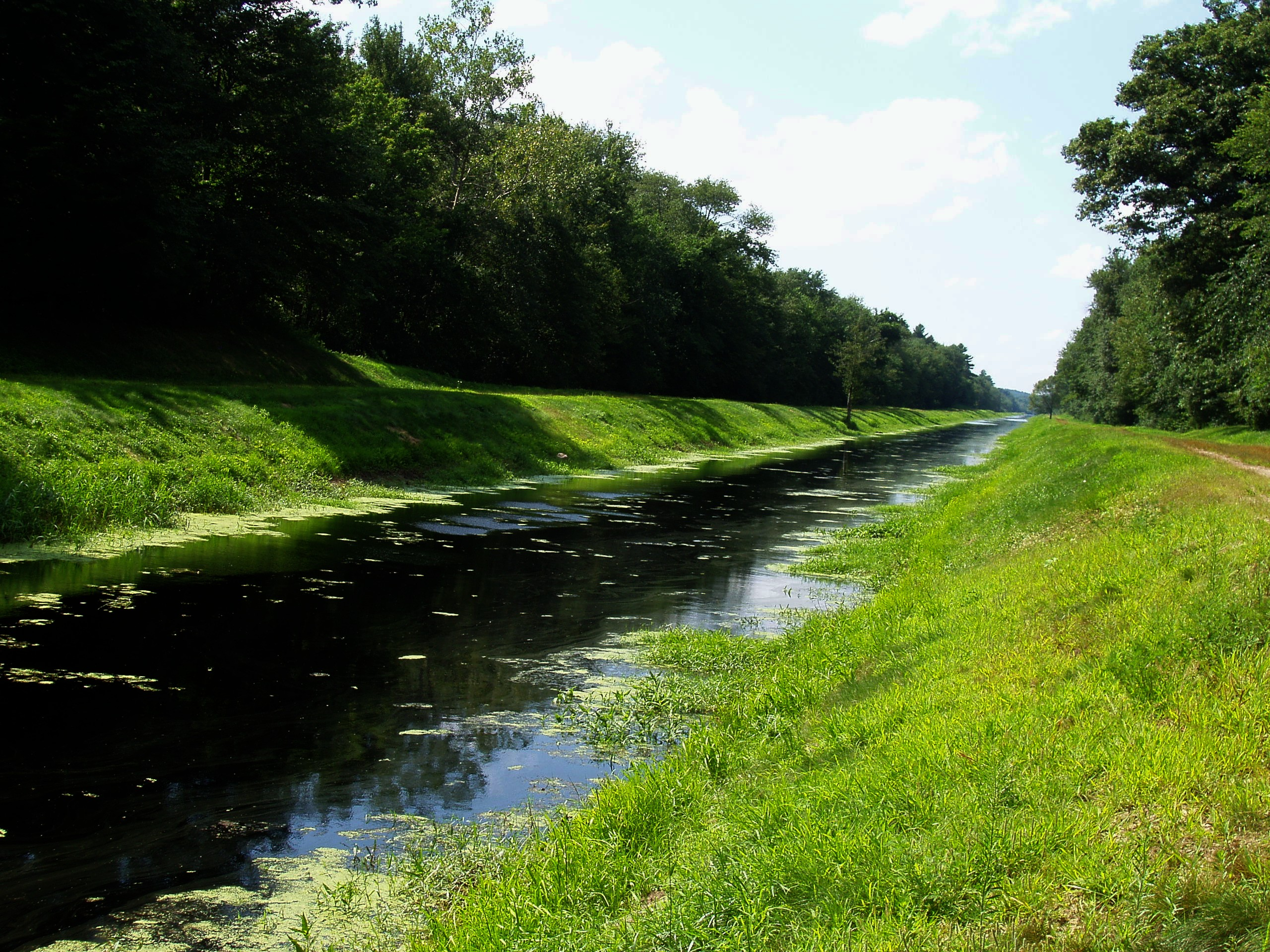
The canal has been cut through a forested moraine not far from the pumping station on the Wenham side.

The Salem Beverly Waterway Canal, sometimes called the Grand Wenham Canal, is an aqueduct canal in Topsfield and Wenham, Massachusetts. It was never used to transport anything but water and recreational canoeists.

The canal was built in 1917 to provide water for Beverly, Massachusetts and Salem, Massachusetts, and is owned with its adjacent land by the Salem-Beverly Water Supply Board. It was dredged and widened in 1974, with gravel roads built on each side of the canal. The canal carries water from the Ipswich River, Topsfield, through the Wenham Swamp to Wenham. From there, a pipeline also constructed in 1917 carries it to Wenham Lake.

== History ==
In 1911 the State Board of Health was directed by the General Court of Massachusetts to investigate the feasibility of diverting water from the Ipswich River to augment the dwindling water supply of the Salem-Beverly region. The resulting House Document No. 1652, January, 1912, caused the legislature in Chapter 85 of the Resolves of 1912 to appoint a three-man commission to study water-supply issues in most of the towns and cities of northeastern Massachusetts. In House Document No. 2200, the commission took a strong stand in favor of diversion. The prevailing sentiment was that water needed so badly for drinking should not be wasted in Ipswich Bay. Ipswich by then had long ceased to be a commercial port, in favor of Newburyport and Boston. Environmental issues concerning the fate of the wetlands were far in the future.

Chapter 700 of the Acts of 1913 created the Salem and Beverly Water Supply Board and gave it the right to divert Ipswich River flows over 20 million gallons per day, up to 2500 million gallons per year, in December through May, at a certain location in Topsfield (approximately the mouth of the canal). In 1917 a canal was excavated from the Ipswich River through Wenham Swamp to a pumping station in Wenham, where it was pumped up to nearby Wenham Lake, a reservoir. The board declined construction of artificial impoundments on the river or canal as unfeasible. In fact, in times of high water, three channels in the bank of the modern canal allow water to flow freely into or out of the swamp, which is part of the Ipswich River wetlands.
