= Wenham Museum =

Museum in Wenham, Massachusetts, United States

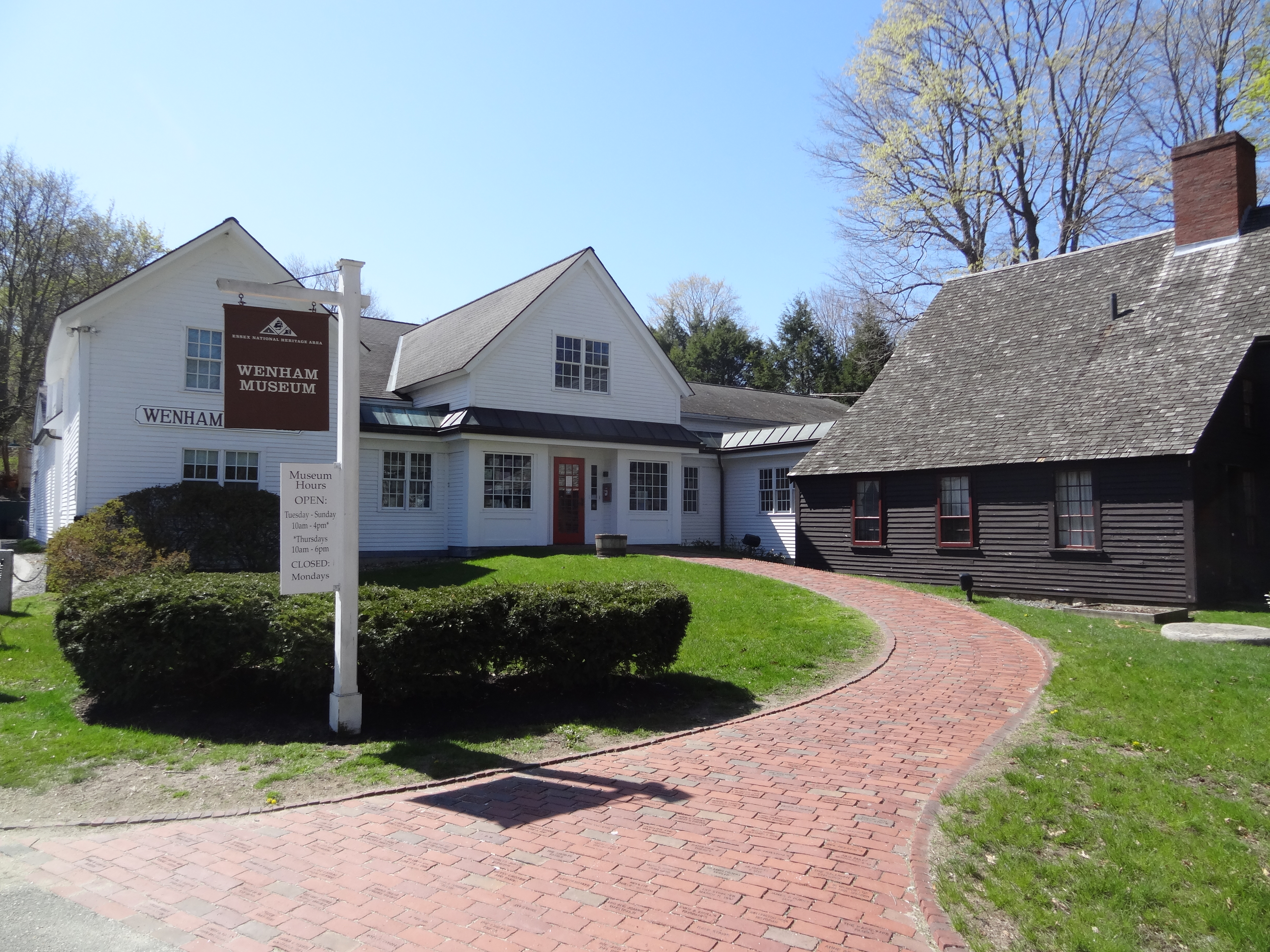
- The outside of the Wenham Museum (April 2016).

- Location within Massachusetts
- Established: 1922
- Coordinates: 42.6038367°N 70.887121°W
- Website: wenhammuseum.org

The Wenham Museum is a museum in Wenham, Massachusetts, United States.

The museum is a non-profit organization that was established in 1922 and currently has a collection estimated at 45,000 objects, which includes textiles, toys, photographs, archival documents, children's books, and objects related to domestic life dating from the 17th century to the present. The museum also owns, preserves, and interprets the Claflin-Gerrish-Richards House, a 17th-century colonial house to which the main museum building has been added. The museum is best known for its collection of over 5000 antique dolls, and eleven permanent, electric model train dioramas. Known for being a hands-on history museum, its main visitor demographic is families with children age 8 and younger. It is a participating member of the Association of Children's Museums and is accredited by the American Alliance of Museums (AAM).

Traditionally the museum runs several family-oriented community events throughout the year, including semi-annual artisan fairs, antique and collectibles sales, and community art projects. The museum also hosts public and private school students who participate in a hands-on Colonial Life Field Trip Program which focuses on typical chores and tasks that would have been required of children during the colonial era in what is now Massachusetts.
