= Wenham Historic District =

Historic district in Massachusetts, United States

- U.S. National Register of Historic Places
- U.S. Historic district
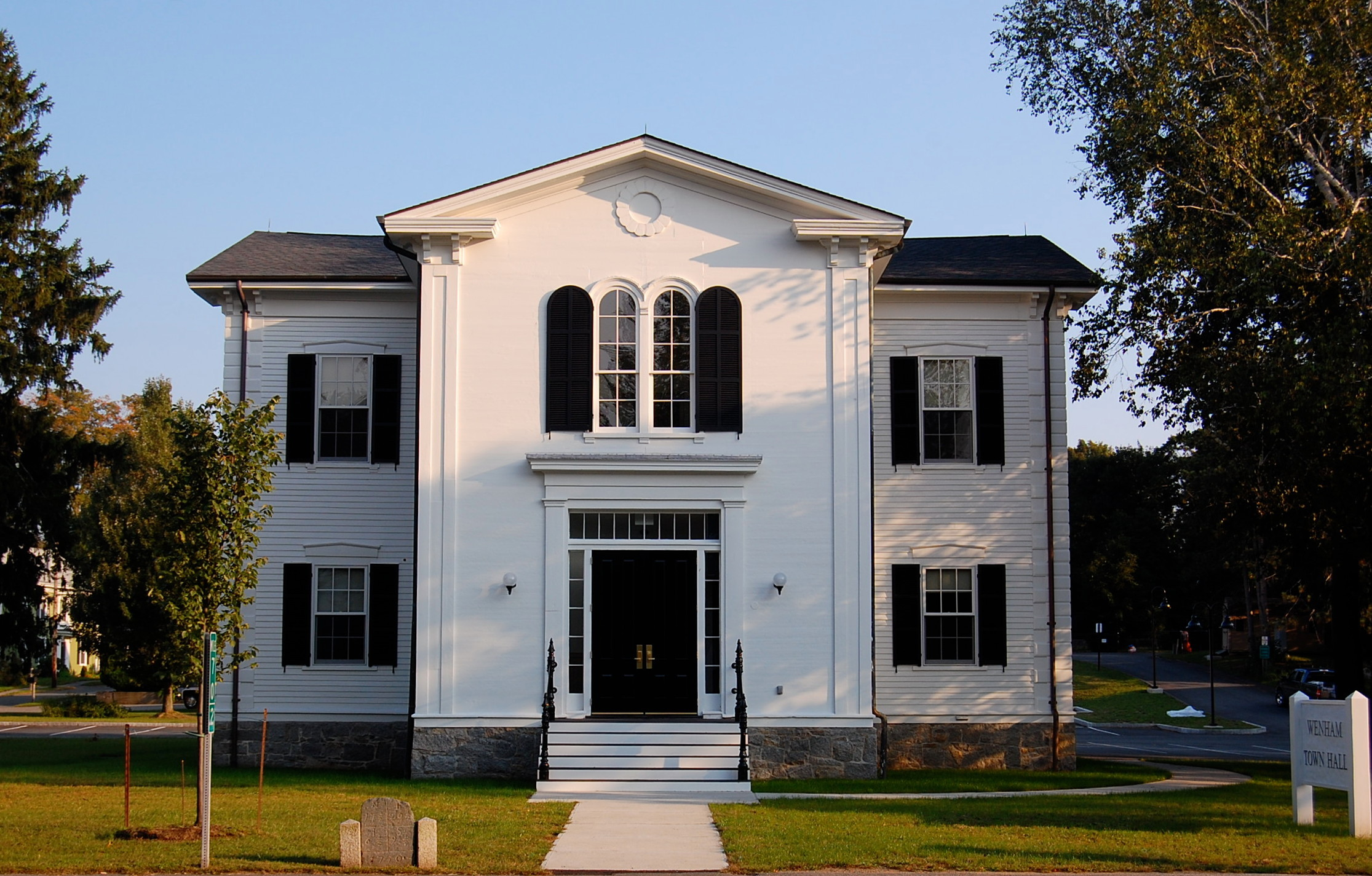
- Wenham Town Hall

- Location within Massachusetts Location within the United States
- Location: Wenham, Massachusetts
- Coordinates: 42°35′53″N 70°53′20″W
- Built: 1710
- Architectural style: Greek Revival, Colonial, Federal
- NRHP reference No.: 73000852
- Added to NRHP: April 13, 1973

The Wenham Historic District is a predominantly rural and residential historic district in Wenham, Massachusetts. It encompasses the full length of Main Street (Massachusetts Route 1A) between the Beverly and Hamilton lines, a stretch of one of the original post roads which is known to have elements of its present alignment as early as 1710. The architecture along the route is predominantly residential, principally excepting the cluster of municipal and religious buildings in the town center. Most of the buildings in the district were built in the 18th and 19th centuries.

The district was listed on the National Register of Historic Places in 1973.

== See also ==
- National Register of Historic Places listings in Essex County, Massachusetts
