= Wenham Lake Ice Company =

Ice exporter in Wenham, Massachusetts, US

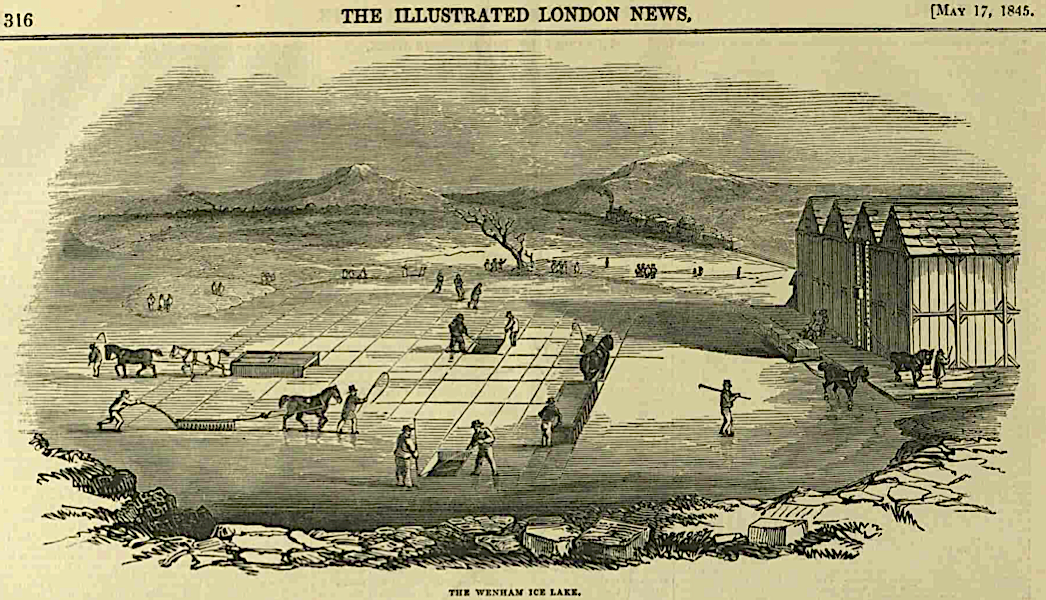
Harvesting ice on Wenham Lake

The Wenham Lake Ice Company, operating out of Wenham Lake in Wenham, Massachusetts, United States, harvested ice and exported it all around the world before the advent of factory-made ice. Wenham-lake ice was awarded a royal warrant from Queen Victoria.

== History ==
Wenham Lake Ice Company
- Founders: Charles B. Lander; Henry T. Ropes
- Headquarters: Wenham, Massachusetts, United States

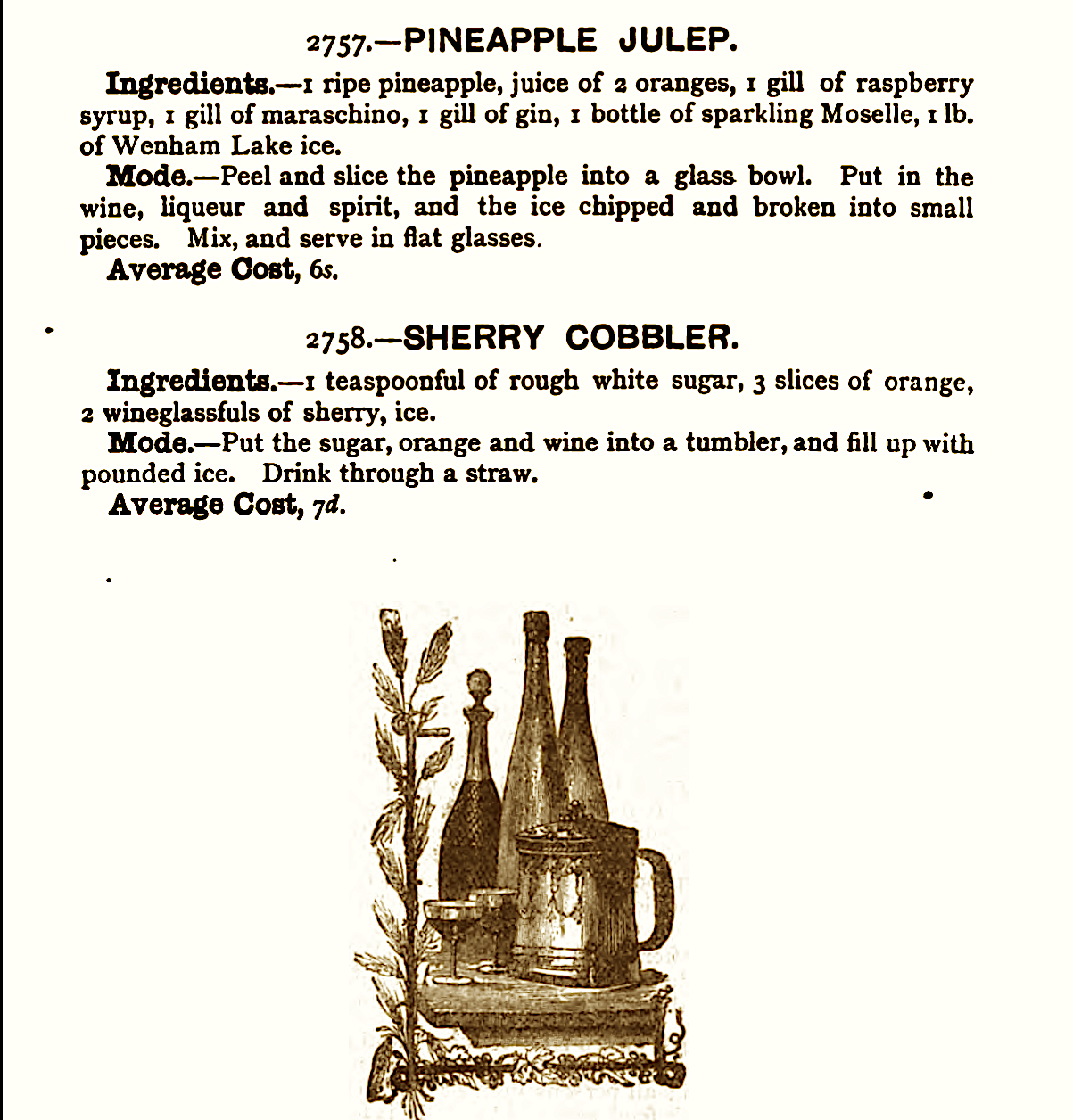
Mrs Beeton's cocktail recipes with Wenham Lake ice

The company was founded by Charles B. Lander and Henry T. Ropes.

In 1842-43, Charles Lander launched the construction of several ice houses around the Wenham Lake. According to Michael Faraday, the water of Wenham Lake was so pure from salts and air bubbles that it could withstand higher temperature than regular ice without melting. In November 1843, the town of Wenham granted Charles Lander the right to build a small network of railroads between the ice houses. In March 1844, Lander bought Peter's Hill for $75 and could plan the expansion of its ice-house operations. However, Lander was facing financial shortages and sold part of the company to George Wheatland and Judge Joshua H. Ward

At the end of the 1840s, the ice from Wenham Lake became a luxurious commodity in London. The company opened offices all over Great Britain and Ireland. In large institutions for poor sick people, wrote Florence Nightingale (1859), Wenham Lake ice stopped the milk curdling in summer. By 1888 Mrs Beeton printed a cocktail recipe that used Lake Wenham ice; some Victorian households had iceboxes cooled with it. In 1866, Massey & Son's Biscuit, Ice & Compote Book; Or, The Essence of Modern Confectionery advised wealthy entertainers to "send a block of Wenham Lake ice to the turners to be turned into the form of an elegant vase" to make an "elegant and novel stand."

== Advertising ==
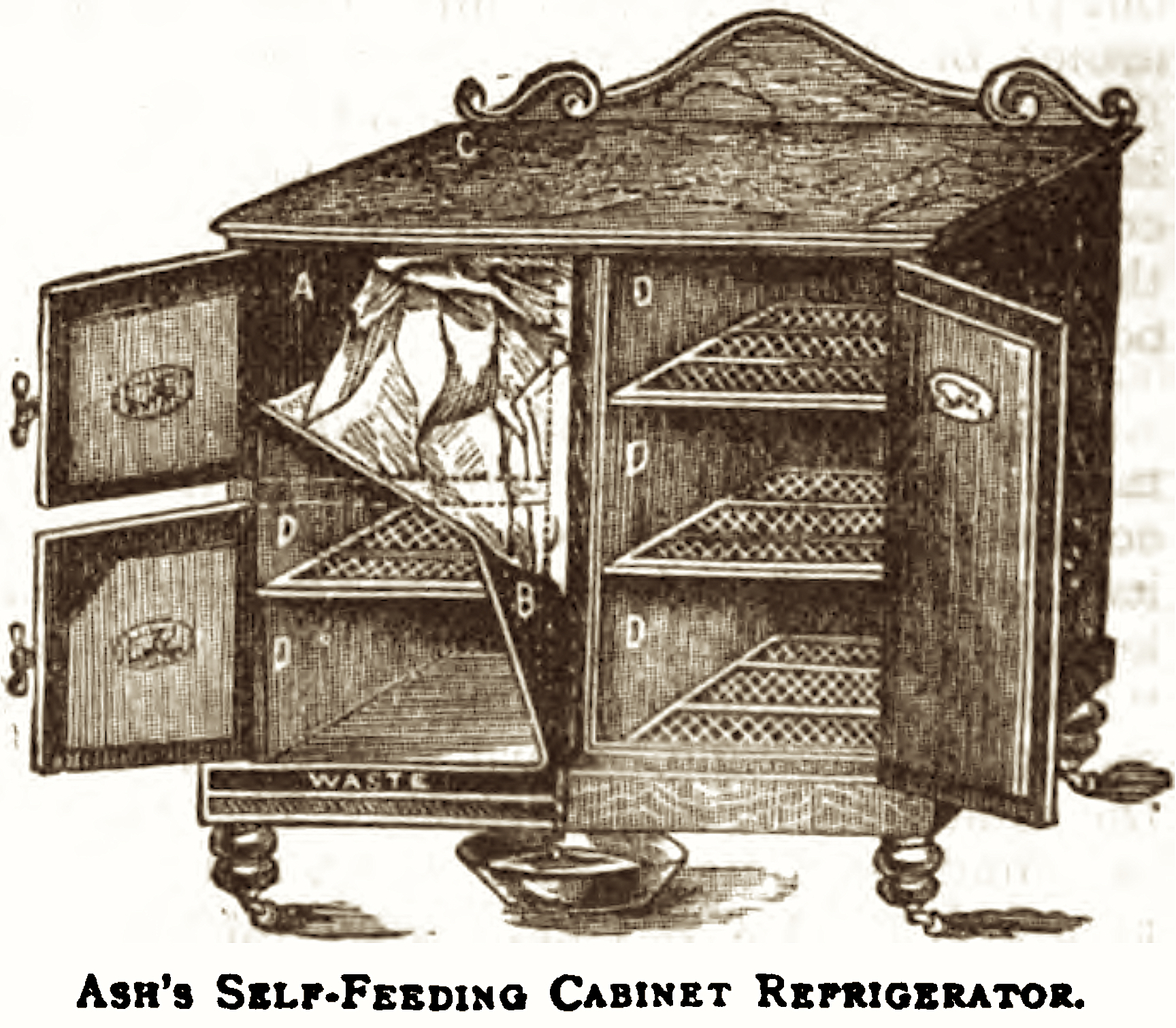
A Victorian fridge chilled by Lake Wenham ice)

The company opened a storefront at 125 in the Strand, London in the summer 1844. Every day, workers would put a large block of ice in the window, and none of the typical neighborhood residents had ever seen a block of ice anywhere before. As a gimmick, the workers would put a newspaper on the other side of the block of ice so that passers-by could read the print through the ice, from outside the store looking into the window.

The Ice Company advertised its product as "suited for table use, for mixing with liquids, or placing in direct contact with provisions, jellies, etc."

== See also ==
- List of ice companies
