= Edith Claflin =

American classical philologist (1875–1953)

Edith Frances Claflin (6 October 1875, Quincy, Massachusetts – 5 March 1953, New York City) was an American linguist, a noted scholar of Latin and Greek.

== Career ==
Claflin earned her B.A. from Radcliffe College in 1897, graduating magna cum laude and Phi Beta Kappa. She majored in Greek and Latin at Radcliffe, and continued her study of these subjects at Bryn Mawr College from 1897 to 1899. As a Garrett European Fellow from Bryn Mawr, she spent 1899–1900 at the American School of Classical Studies in Athens, Greece. She earned her PhD from Bryn Mawr in 1904, with a dissertation entitled, "The syntax of the Boetian dialect inscriptions," which was published by the Lord Baltimore Press in 1905.

Following receipt of her doctorate, Claflin taught Greek and Latin at several secondary schools. She was an Instructor of Greek and Latin at the Prospect Hill School (Greenfield, Massachusetts) from 1901 to 1907; then head of the Classics Dept. at the Monticello Seminary (Godfrey, Illinois) from 1906 to 1913; and a Greek and Latin teacher at the Laurel School (Cleveland, Ohio) from 1914 to 1916. She served as head of the Greek Department at Rosemary Hall Academy in Connecticut from 1916 to 1933. She moved to New York City in 1936, when she was appointed lecturer in Greek and Latin at Barnard College, where she stayed until her retirement in 1945. She taught a course in Medieval Latin at the Columbia University School of General Studies from 1936 until her death in 1953.

Even though the demands of secondary school teaching limited the research opportunities available to Claflin, she managed to publish regularly in scholarly journals and was an active member of several scholarly societies. She was a founding member of the Linguistic Society of America (LSA) and participated actively in the society, attending meetings regularly from 1926 until her death and serving on its executive committee from 1943 to 1945. She published well-regarded papers in the LSA's journal, Language, as well as in the American Journal of Philology (AJP) and Classical Philology (CP).

She was known as an authority on the Indo-European middle voice (Claflin 1929, 1938, 1942, 1946).

The Linguistic Circle of New York established an Edith Claflin Memorial Fund in her honor in 1952.

== Selected publications ==
- Claflin, Edith Frances. 1905. The syntax of the Boetian dialect inscriptions. [Published Baltimore, Md., The Lord Baltimore Press. Bryn Mawr College Monograph series, v. 3.]
- Claflin, Edith F. 1929. The hypothesis of the Italo-Celtic impersonal passive in -r-. Language 5, 232–50.
- Claflin, Edith F. 1938. The Indo-European middle ending -r-. Language 14, 1–9.
- Claflin, Edith F. 1942. The middle verb vidêrï. Language 18, 26–32.
- Claflin, Edith F. 1943. Videor as a Deponent in Plautus. AJP 64, 71–79.
- Claflin, Edith F. 1943–4. Teaching the Art of Reading Latin. The Classical Journal 39, 130–36.
- Claflin, Edith F. 1946. The Middle Voice in the De Senectute. AJP 67, 193–221.
