= Claflin doctrine =

American legal rule about trusts

Claflin doctrine is a U.S. law doctrine which states that a trust cannot be modified or terminated, even if all beneficiaries agree, if to do so would be contrary to a material purpose of the settlor. Material purposes include spendthrift, support, and discretionary trusts.

The rule takes its name from the 1889 Massachusetts case Claflin v. Claflin, in which a father had left a large sum of money to his son. However, the father specified that the money was to be paid in three installments: $10,000 at age 21, a further $10,000 at age 25, and the remainder of the estate at age 30, thus creating a trust. Upon turning 18, the son petitioned the court to force the early disbursement of the entire estate. The younger Claflin was relying on the doctrine that courts have the power to change trust provisions under certain circumstances. The court's decision clarified that courts lack the power to reform a trust such that it would undo a material purpose of the trust. The court then found that the delay in the distribution of the son's inheritance was a material purpose, aimed at preventing or abating financial mismanagement. Thus, the immediate distribution of the entire sum at once, even though son was eventually entitled to the entire amount, would go against the material purpose of the trust, and the court declined to change the terms of the trust.
