= Harold Parker State Forest =

Protected area in Massachusetts, United States

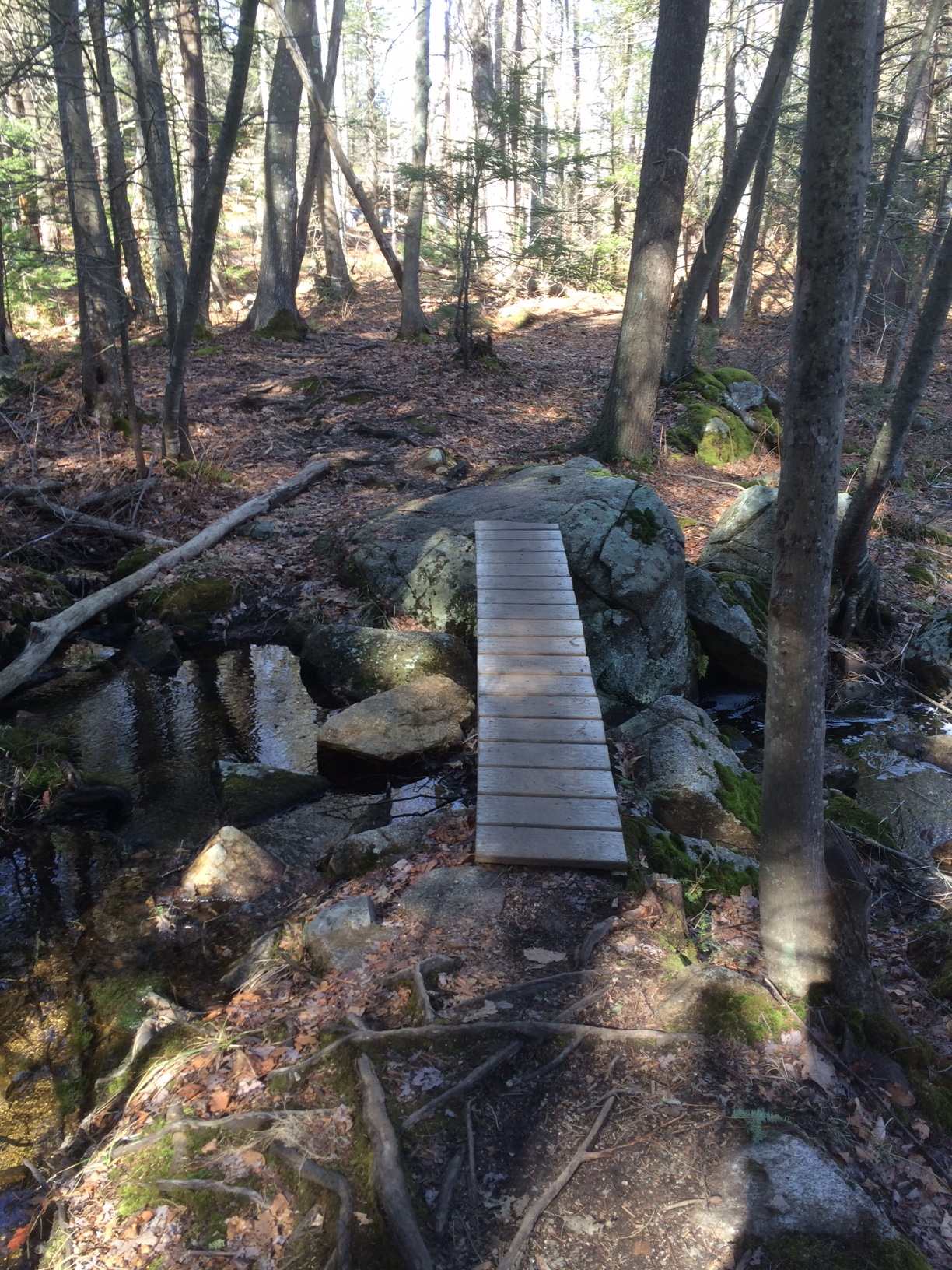
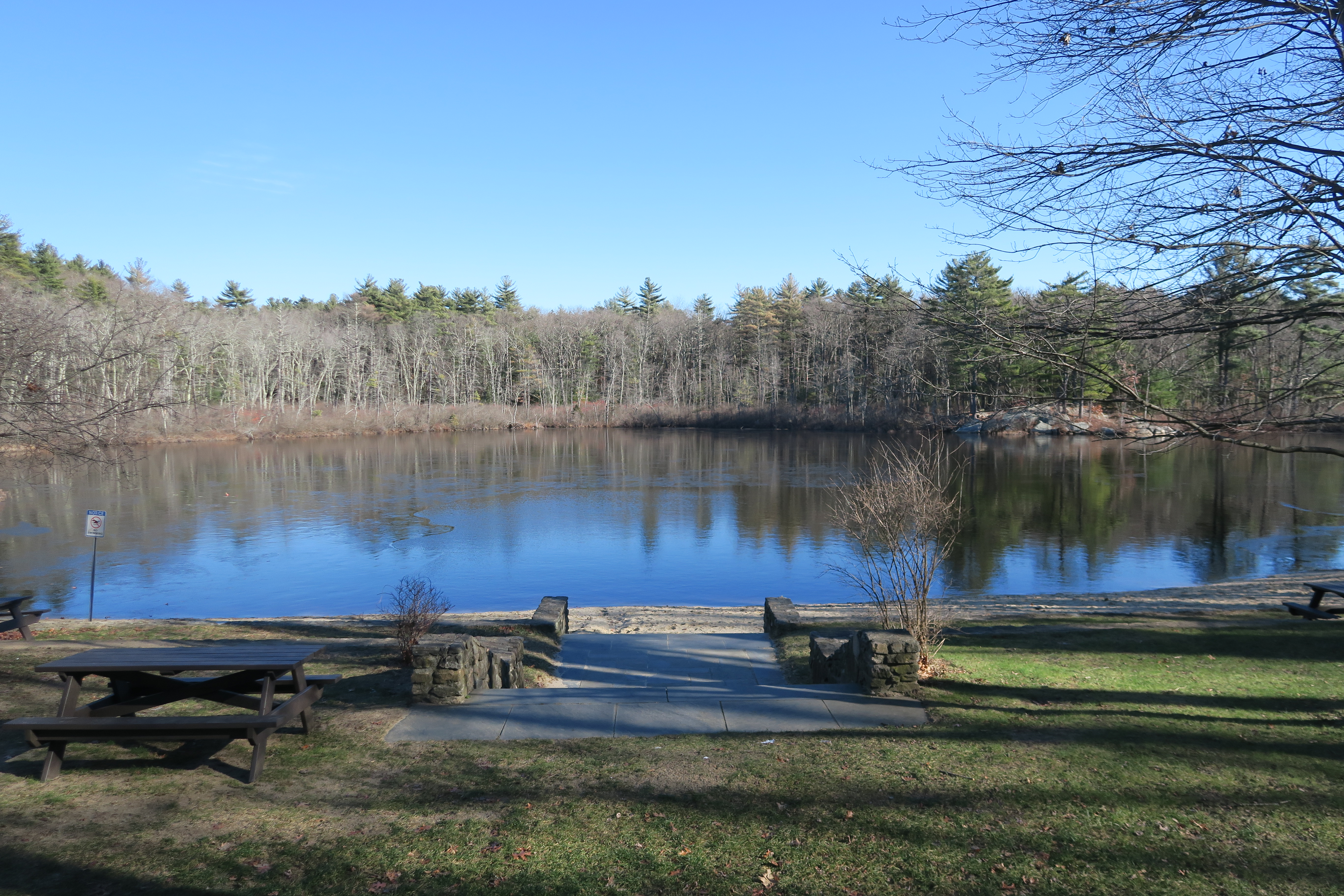
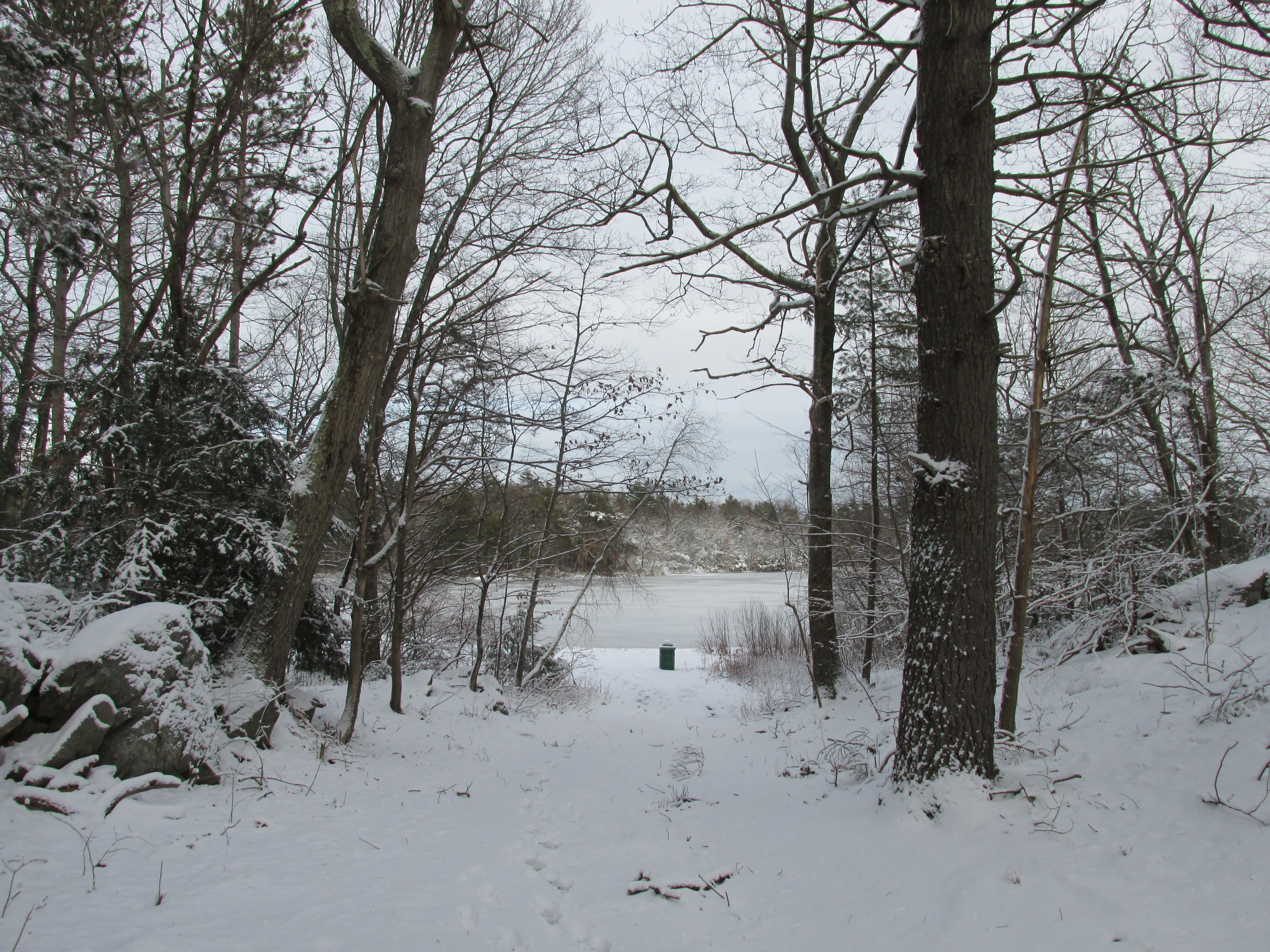
- Bridge crossing on one of the forest's many challenging single-track mountain biking trails Berry Pond Stearns Pond Seasonal views of ponds in Harold Parker State Forest

- Location within Massachusetts Location within the United States
- Location: Andover, North Andover, North Reading, and Middleton, Massachusetts, United States
- Coordinates: 42°37′03″N 71°04′08″W
- Area: 3,320 acres (1,340 ha)
- Elevation: 112 ft (34 m)
- Established: 1916
- Named for: State Forest Commissioner Harold Parker
- Administrator: Massachusetts Department of Conservation and Recreation
- Website: Official website

Harold Parker State Forest is a publicly owned forest with recreational features encompassing more than 3,300 acres (1,300 ha) in the towns of Andover, North Andover, North Reading, and Middleton, Massachusetts. Ponds, swamps, rolling hills, glacial erratics and rocky outcroppings can be found in the state forest, which features more than 35 miles (56 km) of backwoods roads and trails as well as remnants of 18th-century farming and milling operations. It is managed by the Massachusetts Department of Conservation and Recreation.

== History ==
The forest was among the state's earliest acquisitions of logged-over land for purposes of reforestation. It was established in 1916, and named for the Massachusetts State Forest Commission's first chairman, Harold Parker, who died that same year. The Civilian Conservation Corps was active at two camps in the forest from 1933 until 1941. The corps' work included the damming of small streams, creating many of the small ponds that dot the forest's landscape.

== Activities and amenities ==
Trails: The forest's logging roads and trails (which includes a section of the Bay Circuit Trail) are used for hiking, walking, mountain biking, horseback riding, and cross-country skiing.

Ponds: Fishing and non-motorized boating are available at 11 ponds including Bear, Berry, Brackett, Collins, Delano, Field, Salem, Stearns and Sudden.

Camping: The 89-site campground offers campers hot showers and access to swimming. Beaches, camping and restrooms are wheelchair-accessible.

The forest also offers picnicking and restricted hunting.

== Mountain bike trails ==
The single track trails at Harold Parker provide an opportunity to enjoy the flow of the woods. Most of the riding is geared toward the intermediate mountain bike enthusiast. According to the New England Mountain Bike Association (NEMBA), the single track riding rates as 30% easy, 30% moderate, and 40% difficult with some rocky sections. The trail encompassing Salem Pond, the Yellow Diamond Trail, is located off Middleton Rd. and is one of the best mountain bike experiences on the North Shore, and additionally there are over twenty miles of moderately hard cross country trails interweaving throughout. Hunting is allowed in the State forest during hunting season in Massachusetts, but according to the Department of Conservation and Recreation from Jenkins Road west to Rt. 125 is hunt free. Entering the State Forest can be easily done from Rt. 114 in North Andover, Massachusetts or from Rt. 125 in Andover, Massachusetts. The 3,000 acres will take a few days of riding to fully explore, and getting lost is easy to do; detailed maps of Harold Parker are available online for free at the NEMBA web site, and the trails are well-marked by DCR.
