= Wenham, Massachusetts =

- Town
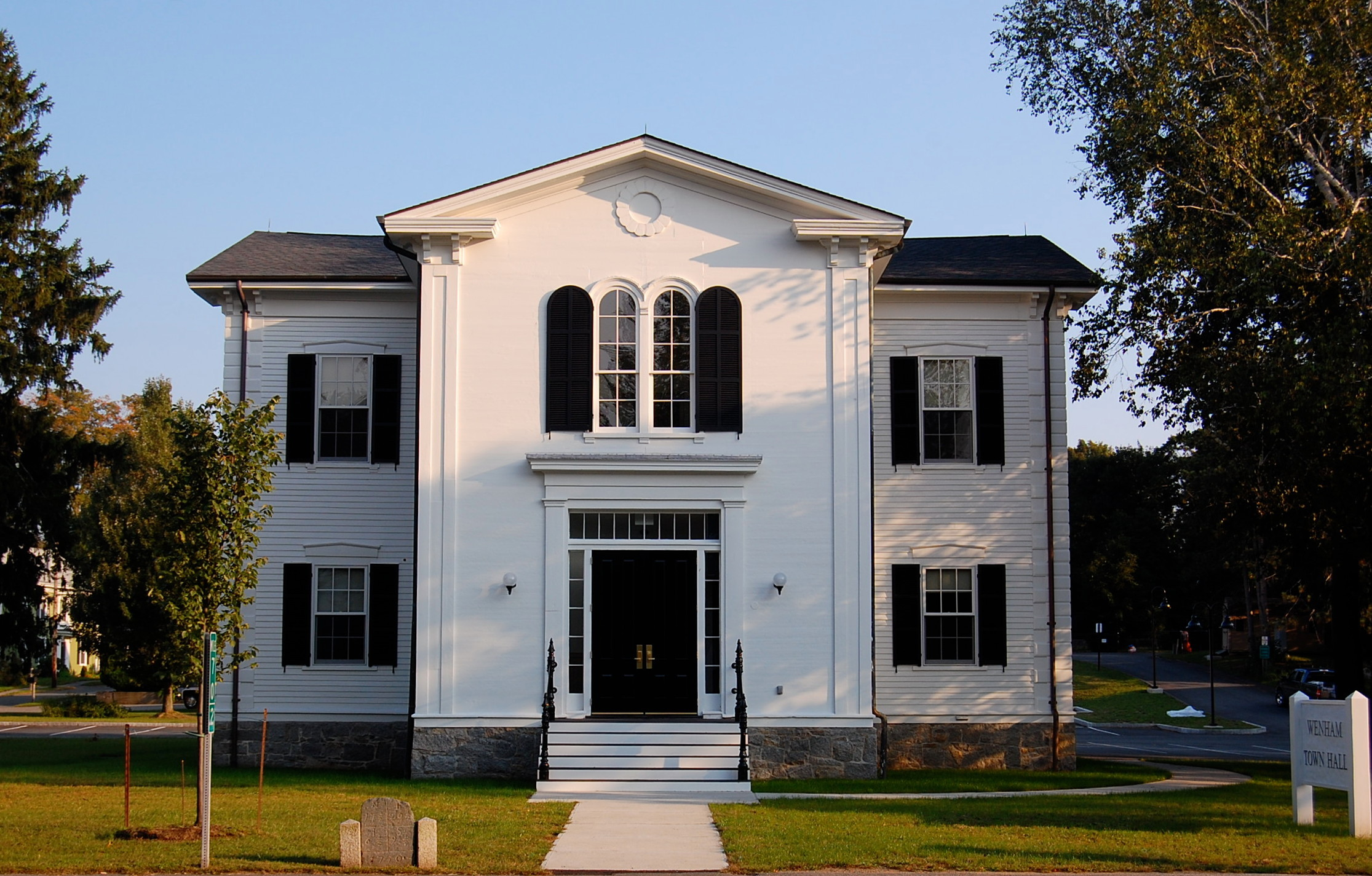
- The Wenham Town Hall on Route 1A

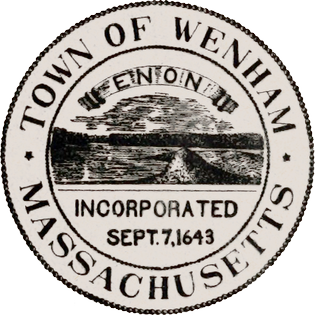
- Seal

- Location in Essex County and the state of Massachusetts.
- Coordinates: 42°36′15.15″N 70°53′12.58″W
- Country: United States
- State: Massachusetts
- County: Essex
- Settled: 1635
- Incorporated: 1643

Government
  - Type: Open Town Meeting
  - Town Administrator: Steve Poulous
  - Board of Selectmen: Chairman Jack Wilhelm; Vice Chairman John Clemenzi; Clerk Catherine Harrison
  - Police Chief: Thomas Perkins
  - Fire Chief: Stephen B. Kavanagh

Area
  - Total: 8.1 sq mi (21.1 km^{2})
  - Land: 7.6 sq mi (19.8 km^{2})
  - Water: 0.46 sq mi (1.2 km^{2})
- Elevation: 105 ft (32 m)

Population (2020)
  - Total: 4,979
  - Density: 651/sq mi (251/km^{2})
- Time zone: UTC−5 (Eastern)
  - Summer (DST): UTC−4 (Eastern)
- ZIP Code: 01984
- Area code: 351 / 978
- FIPS code: 25-74595
- GNIS feature ID: 0619455
- Website: Town of Wenham, MA, Official Web Site

Wenham (/ˈwɛnəm/) is a town in Essex County, Massachusetts. The population was 4,979 at the time of the 2020 census.

The town of Wenham was settled in 1635 and incorporated in 1643, and is closely tied to its neighboring town of Hamilton, sharing a school system, library, recreation department and commuter rail station.

Noted for its historic character and rural scenery, Wenham has farm lands, lakes, woodlands, historic homes, and old stone walls that accompany its winding tree-lined roads. It features nearly 300 acres (120 ha) of parks, playgrounds, and recreational lands.

== History ==
Wenham was settled in 1635 and officially incorporated in 1643.

English settlers came to Wenham in the 1630s, but the area had been home to the Agawam people, an Eastern Algonquian tribe whose numbers were greatly reduced by a massive epidemic around 1617, possibly smallpox.

Three grandchildren of Agawam Chief Masconomet pressed a claim to the lands of Wenham, Beverly, and Manchester in 1700, and Wenham selectmen paid them three pounds and ten shillings for the quitclaim. Indian artifacts were found frequently throughout Wenham, and a representative collection is in the possession of the Wenham Museum.

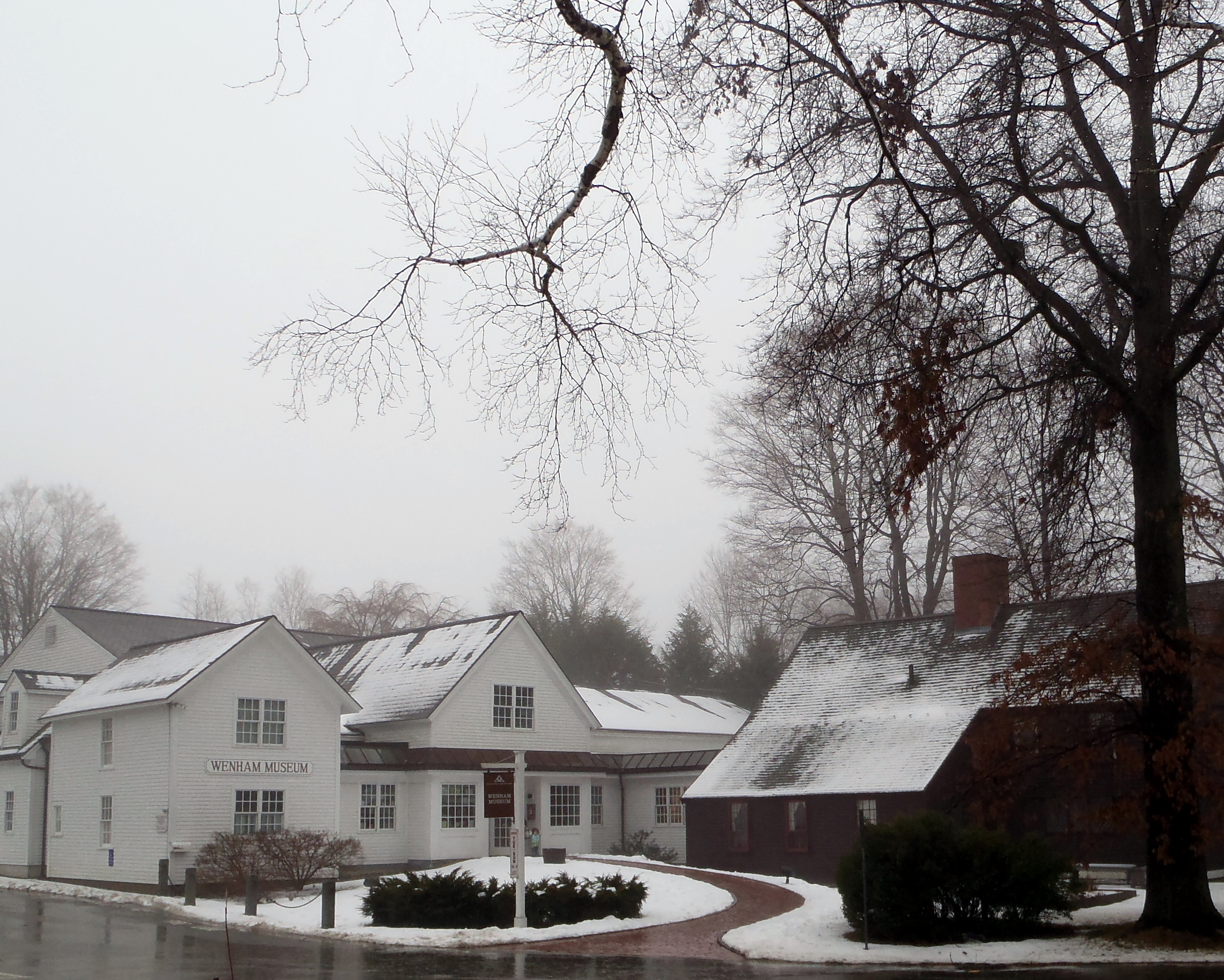
Wenham Museum and Claflin-Richards House

Wenham was originally a part of Salem. Salem's minister Hugh Peters preached to a group on a hill by the Great Pond around 1638, probably to encourage settlement. The earliest land grants in the Wenham area roughly coincide with Peters' sermon. The hill was leveled in later years to make room for the Wenham Lake Ice Company at the Great Pond.

In September 1643, the General Court of Massachusetts granted that Wenham should be a town in its own right and send a representative to the General Court. It was the first town to be set off from Salem. Wenham provided volunteers in King Philip's War in the 1670s, and the French and Indian War in the mid 1700s. In 1774, the town voted to select 15 men as minutemen, and from that time on Loyalists were not welcome in Wenham.

In 1909, steel magnate Henry Clay Frick bought the Iron Rail property so that his daughter Helen could create a vacation home for the mill girls throughout New England. Helen Frick transferred the Iron Rail Vacation Home to the Girls' Clubs of America in 1954, and the town of Wenham bought the property in the 1970s.

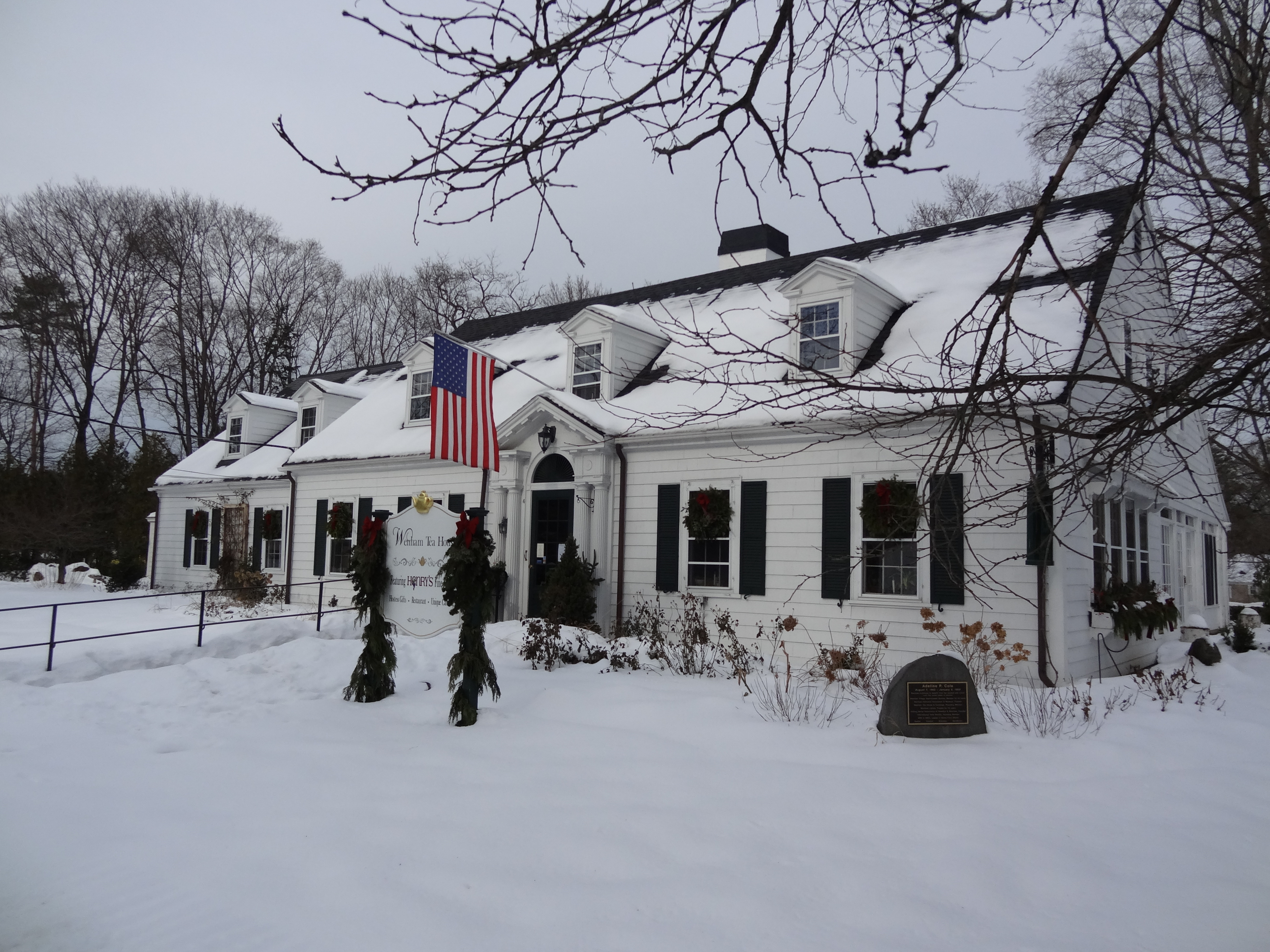
Wenham Tea House

In 1921, the Historical Committee of the Wenham Village Improvement Society bought the 17th-century Claflin-Richards house at the center of town. They eventually added the museum and "the Barn", which became Burnham Hall. The Wenham Historical Association and Museum became independent from the Village Improvement Society and underwent a major renovation and expansion in 1997.

== Geography ==
According to the United States Census Bureau, the town has a total area of 8.1 square miles (21.1 km^{2}), of which 7.6 square miles (19.8 km^{2}) is land and 0.46 square miles (1.2 km^{2}), or 5.91%, is water. It is one of the inland communities within the Metropolitan Area Planning Council's North Shore Task Force, but it is not part of the North Shore in the strictest sense, as it is not on the shore of the Atlantic Ocean (it lies 4 miles (6 km) north of Massachusetts Bay). Wenham Lake lies within the town and in neighboring Beverly, and several other smaller ponds lie within town. A stretch of the Salem Beverly Waterway Canal passes through town as well, and the southernmost portion of the Ipswich River Wildlife Sanctuary lies in the western part of town.

Wenham is bordered on the south by Beverly, on the east by Manchester-by-the-Sea, on the north by Hamilton, on the northwest by Topsfield, and on the west by Danvers. Wenham lies 6 miles (10 km) north of Salem and 21 miles (34 km) north-northeast of Boston.

== Demographics ==
Historical population
Year	Pop.	±%
1790	502	—
1850	977	+94.6%
1860	1,105	+13.1%
1870	985	−10.9%
1880	889	−9.7%
1890	886	−0.3%
1900	847	−4.4%
1910	1,010	+19.2%
1920	1,090	+7.9%
1930	1,119	+2.7%
1940	1,220	+9.0%
1950	1,644	+34.8%
1960	2,798	+70.2%
1970	3,849	+37.6%
1980	3,897	+1.2%
1990	4,212	+8.1%
2000	4,440	+5.4%
2010	4,875	+9.8%
2020	4,979	+2.1%
2023*	4,957	−0.4%
* = population estimate. Source: United States census records and Population Estimates Program data.

As of the census of 2000, there were 4,440 people, 1,285 households, and 957 families residing in the town. The population density was 575.2 inhabitants per square mile (222.1/km^{2}). There were 1,320 housing units at an average density of 171.0 per square mile (66.0/km^{2}). The racial makeup of the town was 97.84% White, 0.43% African American, 0.02% Native American, 1.35% Asian, 0.07% from other races, and 0.29% from two or more races. Hispanic or Latino of any race were 0.59% of the population.

There were 1,285 households, out of which 37.6% had children under the age of 18 living with them, 66.5% were married couples living together, 5.9% had a female householder with no husband present, and 25.5% were non-families. Of all households 22.5% were made up of individuals, and 15.6% had someone living alone who was 65 years of age or older. The average household size was 2.70 and the average family size was 3.19.

In the town, the population was spread out, with 22.0% under the age of 18, 23.6% from 18 to 24, 19.8% from 25 to 44, 20.5% from 45 to 64, and 14.1% who were 65 years of age or older. The median age was 34 years. For every 100 females, there were 82.4 males. For every 100 females age 18 and over, there were 80.3 males.

The median income for a household in the town was $90,524, and the median income for a family was $98,004. Males had a median income of $76,639 versus $43,750 for females. The per capita income for the town was $36,812. About 1.2% of families and 3.3% of the population were below the poverty line, including 1.9% of those under age 18 and 5.1% of those age 65 or over.

== Arts and culture ==
Points of interest:

- Wenham Museum (1922)
- Claflin-Richards House (1690)
- Grand Wenham Canal (1917)
- Newman-Fiske-Dodge House (1658)
- Wenham Lake
- The Academy at Penguin Hall

== Education ==
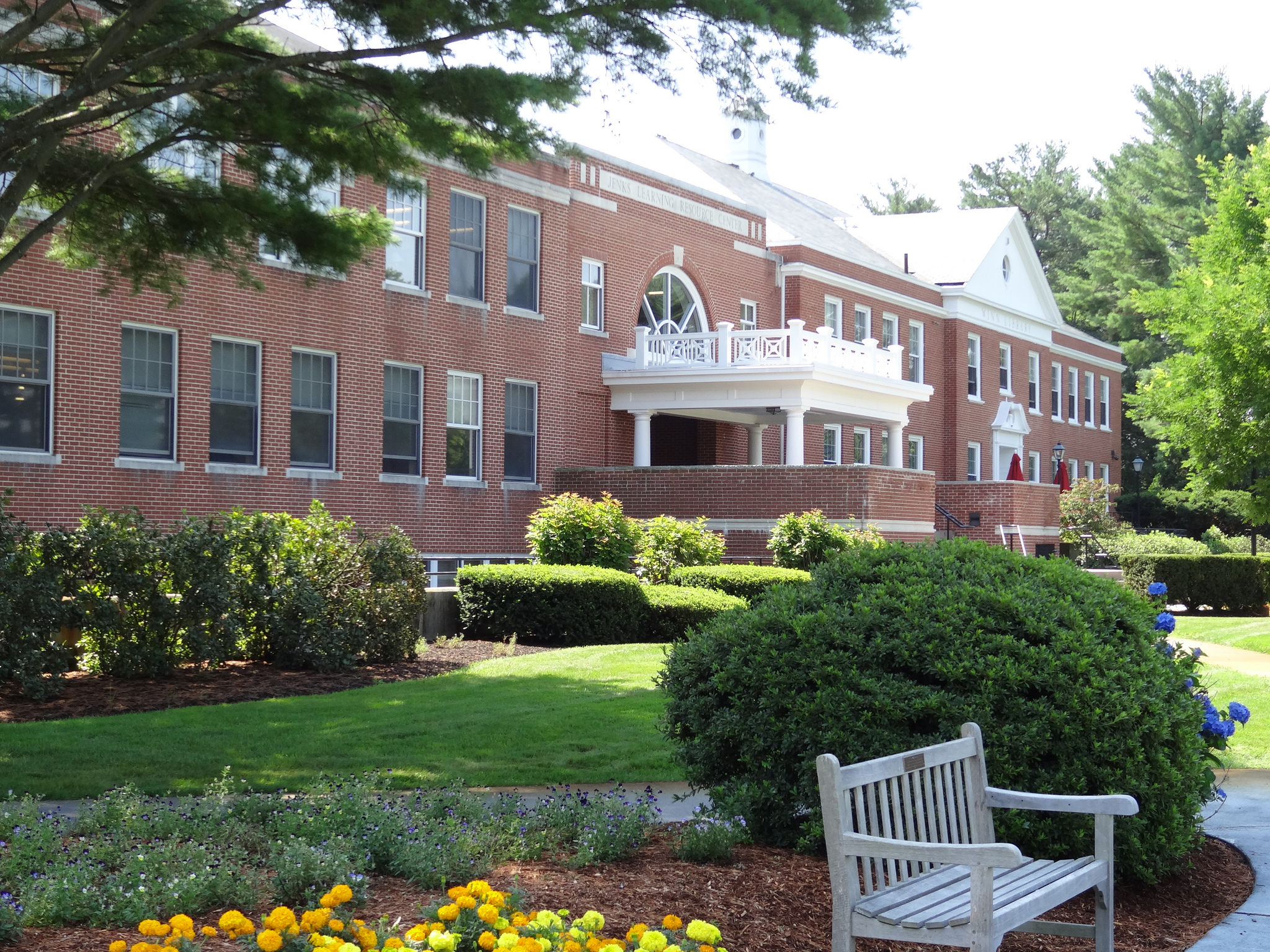
Jenks Library, Gordon College

Wenham is home to Gordon College, a private four-year Christian college.

The Academy at Penguin Hall is located in Wenham. It is an independent, all-girls college preparatory secondary school. Girls in grades 9–12 attend the school.

Wenham is part of the Hamilton-Wenham Regional School District. The town has one public elementary school, the Buker school. Middle school students attend Miles River Middle School, and high school students attend Hamilton-Wenham Regional High School.

== Infrastructure ==
The eastern end of Wenham is crossed by Massachusetts Route 128, with one exit within town. Route 1A crosses through the center of town, with Route 22 crossing through the east and Route 97 crossing the southwest corner of town. Route 35 ends at Route 97 just over the Topsfield town line.

Wenham lies along the Newburyport section of the Newburyport/Rockport Line of the MBTA Commuter Rail. The Hamilton/Wenham station straddles the town line between Hamilton and Wenham with the parking lot roughly half on one side and half on the other and the loading platform about 56 feet north east of the town line, and the North Beverly station lies south of town in Beverly. The tip of the north runway of Beverly Municipal Airport lies just within town; the nearest national and international air service is located at Boston's Logan International Airport.

== Notable people ==
- Paul Harding, Pulitzer Prize–winning author of Tinkers
- Bob Stanley, former Red Sox relief pitcher
