= Chief Masconomet =

Masconomet, (died 1658) spelled many different ways in colonial deeds, was sagamore of the Agawam tribe among the Algonquian peoples during the time of the English colonization of the Americas. He is known for his quitclaim deed ceding all the tribal land, which extended from Cape Ann to the Merrimack River, as far inland as North Andover, Massachusetts and Middleton, Massachusetts, and as far to the southwest as the Danvers River, to John Winthrop the Younger, his heirs and all the settlers of eastern Essex County for a sum of 20 pounds, about 100 dollars.

Although he could not read or write at the time of the deed, Masconomet understood that he was effecting a union of the remnant of the tribe after decimation by disease (probably smallpox) with the English colonists. He testified to that effect before the General Court of Massachusetts, which was questioning the legality of the younger Winthrop's transactions. Winthrop and his heirs were seeking public reimbursement of the 20 pounds. The tribal members did not take up residence in distinct villages of "praying Indians" as did the other tribes but remained distributed on individual farms adjoining those of the English and became integrated into the settlements. Giving up their native language and other marks and affiliations of native identity, they soon vanished into Essex County. Masconomet, henceforward "John the Sagamore", gave his children English names. Memory of their ancestry persisted throughout the 17th century, a few generations after Masconomet's death in 1658. A memorial stone on Sagamore Hill in northeastern Hamilton marks where Masconomet was buried with his gun and tomahawk. In 1667, nine years later, a man was prosecuted for digging up his bones and carrying his skull on a pole.

The Agawams avoided playing a native role in King Philip's War, the first united effort by the Indians to dislodge the English from New England, obliterating the colony. They were not identified as "praying Indians." Masconomet's deed was at first kept in the Winthrop family. At about the time of King Philip's War eastern Essex County also endured a legal attack by the heirs of Captain John Mason, who, based on the Mason Grant of 1621, were claiming all of former Agawam. Masconomet's quitclaim was then registered and was duplicated in every village of eastern Essex County as the original deed of the rightful owner ceding the land to the English in perpetuity. The Mason claim failed, but the settlements had to pay a fee to be rid of it.

Masconomet Regional High School, serving Topsfield, Boxford and Middleton, Massachusetts, honors the sagamore by taking his name.

== Biography ==
Masconomet first appears in written history in an entry in the journal of John Winthrop, the first governor of Massachusetts Bay Colony. Winthrop was exploring the region, and had not yet started his colony on American shores. On June 13, 1630, while aboard his flagship, Arbella, at anchor off what would later become Salem, Massachusetts, Winthrop wrote: "In the morning, the sagamore of Agawam and one of his men came aboard our ship and staid with us all day." Winthrop subsequently disembarked at the new settlement at Boston.

== Bibliography ==
- Perley, Sidney (1912). The Indian Land Titles of Essex County, Massachusetts. Salem: Essex Book & Print Club.
