= Woodberry =

Woodberry may refer to:

== Places ==
- Woodberry, New South Wales, a suburb in Australia
- Woodberry, Baltimore, a neighborhood in the United States
- Woodberry Down, a district of North London, England

== Other uses ==
- Woodberry (surname)
- Woodberry (Baltimore Light Rail station), in the United States
- Woodberry Glacier, in Antarctica
- Woodberry Nunataks, in Antarctica

== See also ==
- Woodberry Forest School, in Woodberry Forest, Madison County, Virginia, in the United States
- Woodberry Down School, in the Manor House area of North London, England
- Woodberry-Quarrels House, a historic house in Hamilton, Massachusetts in the United States
