= Hamilton/Wenham station =

Railway station in Hamilton and Wenham, Massachusetts

Hamilton/Wenham
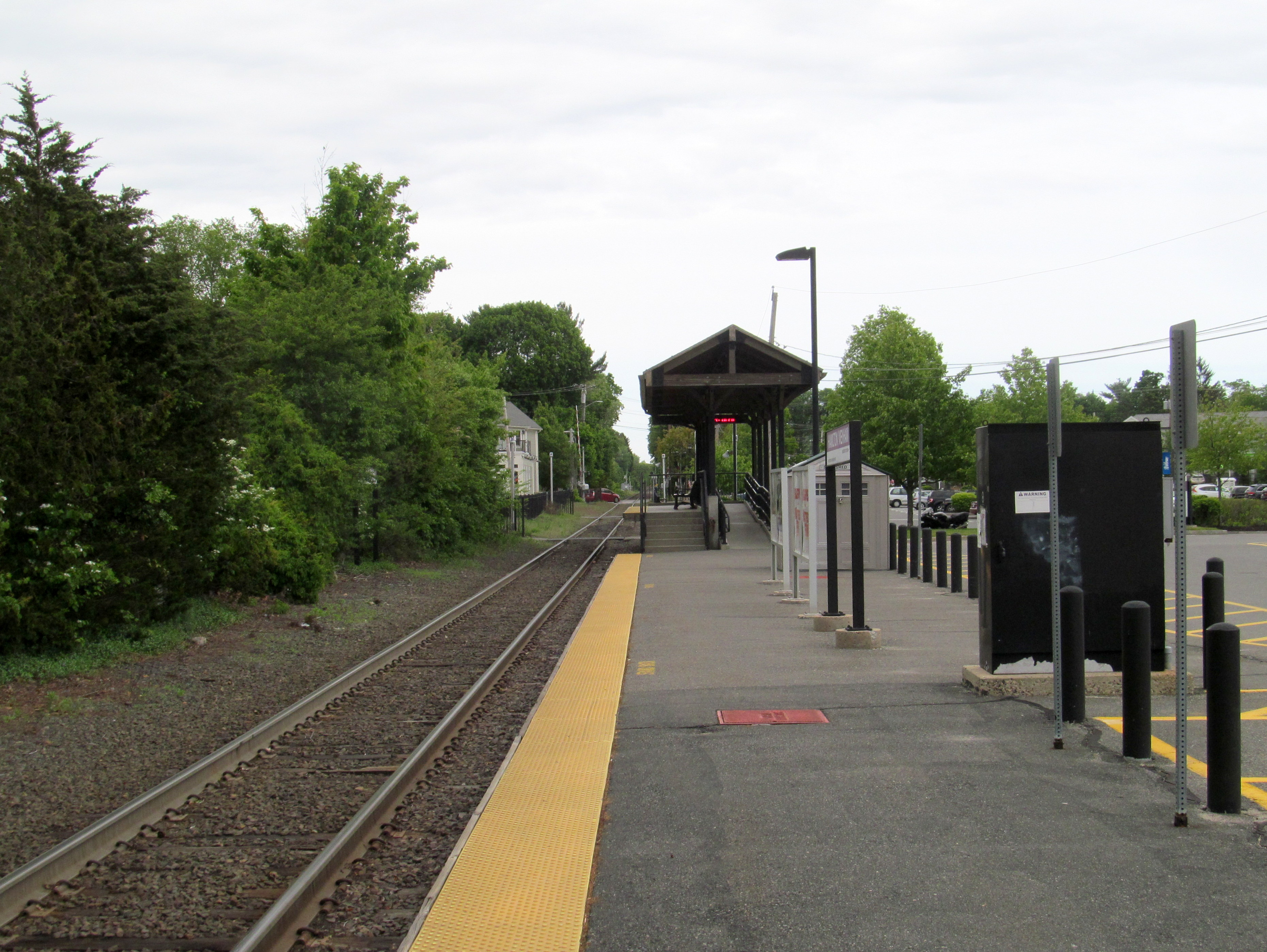
- Hamilton/Wenham station in May 2017

General information
- Location: Bay Road at Walnut Road; Hamilton, Massachusetts
- Coordinates: 42.60889°N 70.87489°W
- Line: Eastern Route
- Platforms: 1 side platform
- Tracks: 1

Construction
- Parking: 194 spaces
- Accessible: Yes

Other information
- Fare zone: 5

History
- Opened: December 18, 1839
- Rebuilt: July 10, 2002
- Former names: Hamilton & Wenham

Passengers
- 2024: 162 daily boardings

Services
Preceding station	MBTA	Following station
North Beverly toward North Station	Newburyport/Rockport Line	Ipswich toward Newburyport
Location

Hamilton/Wenham station is an MBTA Commuter Rail station in Hamilton and Wenham, Massachusetts. It serves the Newburyport Branch of the Newburyport/Rockport Line and is located just south of the intersection of Bay Road (MA Route 1A) and Walnut Road, straddling the Hamilton–Wenham town line, with the southern end of the platform geographically in Wenham.

== History ==
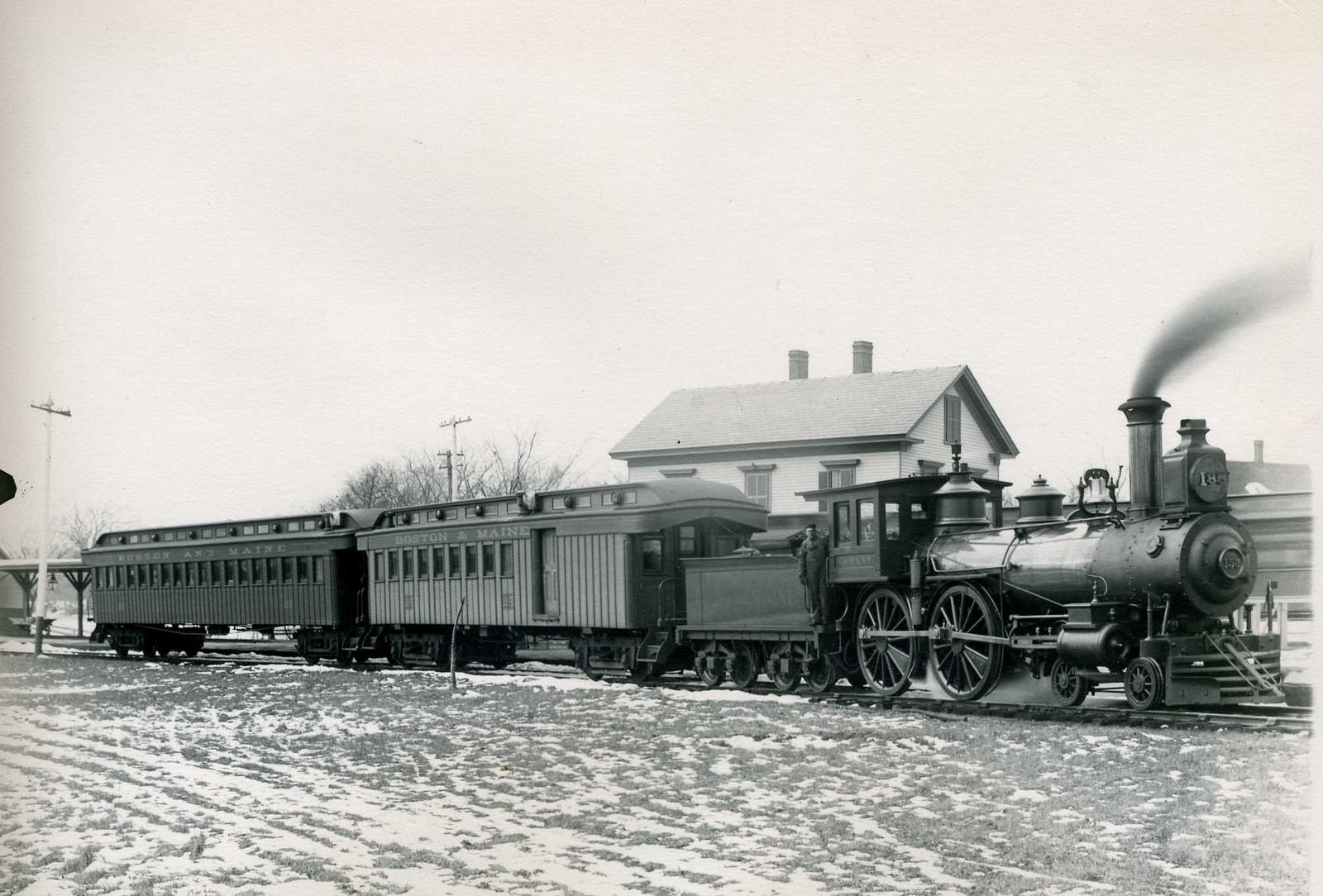
An Essex Branch train at Wenham station in January 1892

Service to the Hamilton/Wenham area began on December 18, 1839 when the Eastern Railroad was extended through the station on its way to Portsmouth, New Hampshire. The station has seen continuous service ever since. By the early 20th century, the station was used as a turnback point for some trains, and it remained so for decades. The town of Hamilton purchased the station in the early 1960s and demolished it to make room for a parking lot. The former freight house was converted to a taxi stand and waiting room.

When the newly formed MBTA began subsidizing commuter rail service in 1965, Hamilton was the outer limit of the MBTA funding district. On January 18, 1965, most Boston and Maine Railroad commuter services outside the MBTA district - except for a handful of locally subsidized trips - were discontinued. Hamilton-Wenham became the outer terminus for 21 round trips to Boston; the only service beyond was a single Newburyport round trip, subsidized by Newburyport and Rowley. After a subsidy agreement was reached - and a lawsuit from the Eastern Massachusetts Street Railway resolved - full service was extended from Hamilton-Wenham to Ipswich on June 28, 1965. Until 1971, some rush hour trips of the route 451 bus (itself transferred from the Eastern Massachusetts Street Railway to the MBTA in 1970) served Hamilton/Wenham.

The 1862-built freight house burned down in late 2000. The former depot building (which had been destroyed by vandals by 1977) and platform were located on the west side of the single track. The accessible mini-high platform was adjacent to the Route 1A crossing, causing the road to be blocked whenever a train was in the station. In 2002, a new platform was constructed on the east side of the tracks some 350 feet (110 m) to the south, allowing the road to remain open while trains are stopped. The new platform opened on July 10, 2002. The former platform was removed soon afterwards.

=== Branches ===
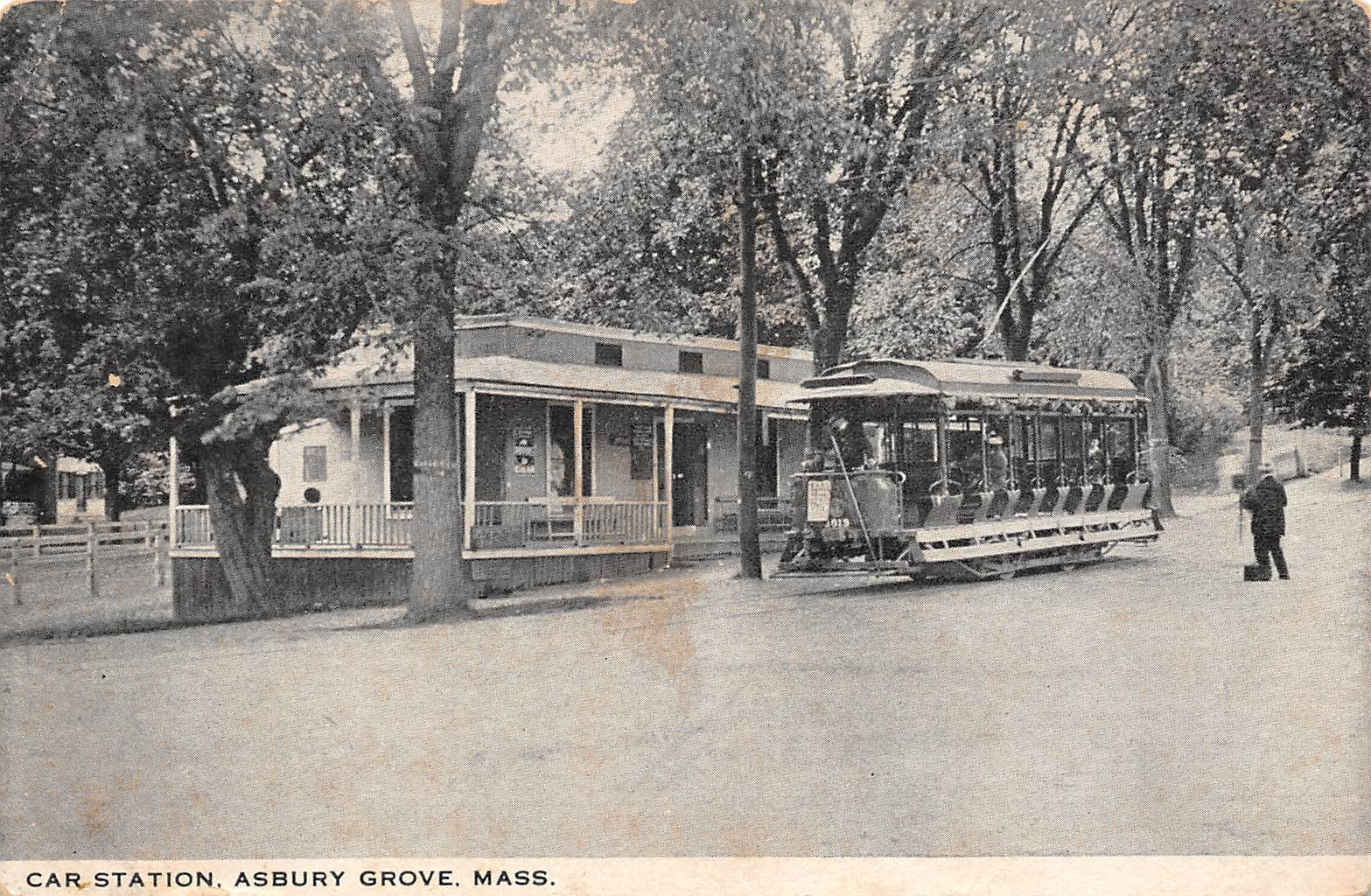
A trolley at Asbury Grove. The 1894 introduction of this trolley line caused the decline and abandonment of the B&M's parallel branch line.

Two branches were built from the station in the 1870s. The Asbury Grove Branch ran 1.1 miles (1.8 km) northwest to Asbury Grove Camp Meeting Ground, a Methodist church meeting area, starting in August 1871. It never saw regularly scheduled passenger service, but instead was used for special summer-only trains to the camp. A parallel trolley line was constructed in 1894, vastly reducing demand for the branch line. In 1896, Willow Street (which crossed the branch near the station, and was used by the trolley line) became a public street. The state legislature refused to approve a grade crossing, which were very controversial at the time. The B&M, hardly interested in the non-longer-profitable branch, abandoned it in 1901.

The Essex Branch ran 6 miles (9.7 km) northeast from Hamilton-Wenham to Essex and Conomo starting in 1872. The line originally had four stations: Miles River (at Bridge Street), Woodbury (at Essex Street), Essex Falls (at Apple Street), Essex (at Shepard Drive). In 1887, the branch was extended 0.5 miles (0.80 km) east to Conomo station at Southern Avenue. The Interstate Commerce Commission denied the B&M's 1926 request to abandon the branch, but allowed closure of the Essex - Conomo section in 1927. The remainder had limited commuter service; most traffic was wood for shipbuilding and ice from Chebacco Lake. The Great Depression destroyed the shipbuilding demand, and the advent of electric refrigerators eliminated the need for natural ice. The B&M applied for abandonment in August 1942; the request was approved that November, and the rails were removed in December 1942 as scrap steel for the war effort. Only the Conomo depot, now a private residence, remains extant.
