= Ipswich railway station (disambiguation) =

Ipswich railway station is a railway station in Ipswich, Suffolk, England.

Ipswich railway station may also refer to:

- Ipswich station (MBTA), in Ipswich, Massachusetts, United States
- Ipswich railway station, Jamaica, in Ipswich, Jamaica
- Ipswich railway station, Queensland, in Ipswich, Queensland, Australia
