= Brown House (Hamilton, Massachusetts) =

Historic house in Massachusetts, United States

- U.S. National Register of Historic Places
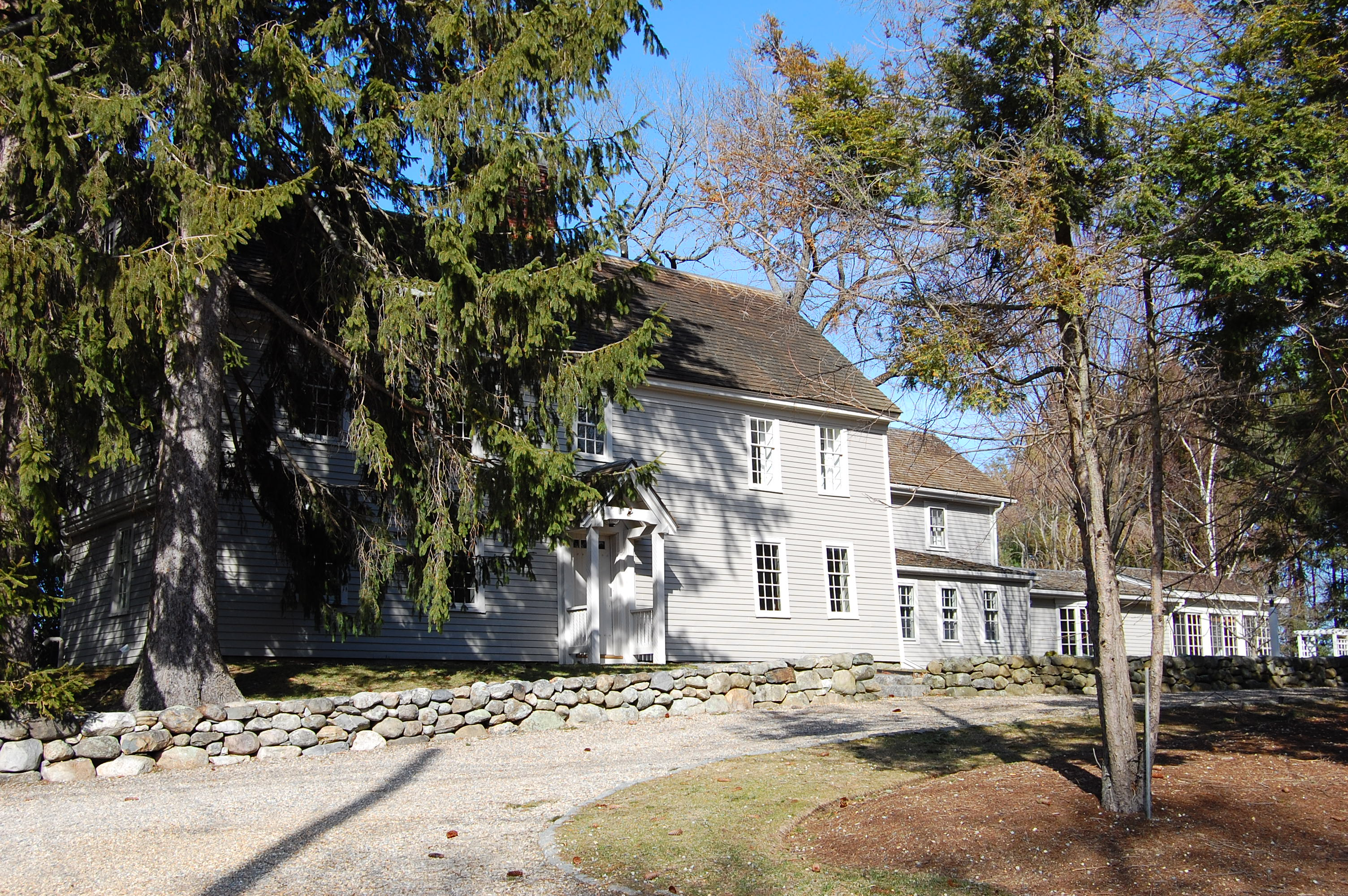

- Location within Massachusetts Location within the United States
- Location: 76 Bridge St., Hamilton, Massachusetts
- Coordinates: 42°36′59″N 70°51′04″W
- Area: 3.3 acres (1.3 ha)
- Architectural style: Colonial
- MPS: First Period Buildings of Eastern Massachusetts TR
- NRHP reference No.: 90000223
- Added to NRHP: March 9, 1990

The Brown House is a historic First Period house in Hamilton, Massachusetts. Built in the 1660s or 1670s, it is one of the oldest surviving houses in Essex County. It was listed on the National Register of Historic Places in 1990.

== Description and history ==
The Brown House is located in a rural-residential area east of Hamilton center, on the north side of Bridge Street just east of its crossing of the Miles River. It is a 2 1/2-story timber-framed structure, with a side gable roof, central chimney, and clapboarded exterior. The main block is five bays wide, with a center entrance whose features date to a 1920s restoration.

Like most early colonial houses this house was built in stages. The oldest portion, the central chimney and the rooms to its right, are estimated to have been built between 1662 and 1673, based in part on the use of roof constructions methods derived from East Anglian practices that fell out of favor after that time. The left side rooms were built later in the 17th century, using different roof construction techniques, as was a leanto section extending across the width of the house. The leanto was demolished in the early 20th century, but preservationist William Sumner Appleton was able to acquire some architectural elements for the collections of the Society for the Preservation of New England Antiquities (now Historic New England).

The house was built either by John Brown Sr., who acquired the land in 1662, or his son Nathaniel, who was the next owner. It underwent a major restoration in 1920, which included adding a staircase replicating that of the Parson Capen House.

== See also ==
- Austin Brown House, another First Period house in Hamilton
- List of the oldest buildings in Massachusetts
- National Register of Historic Places listings in Essex County, Massachusetts
