= Community House (Hamilton, Massachusetts) =

- U.S. National Register of Historic Places
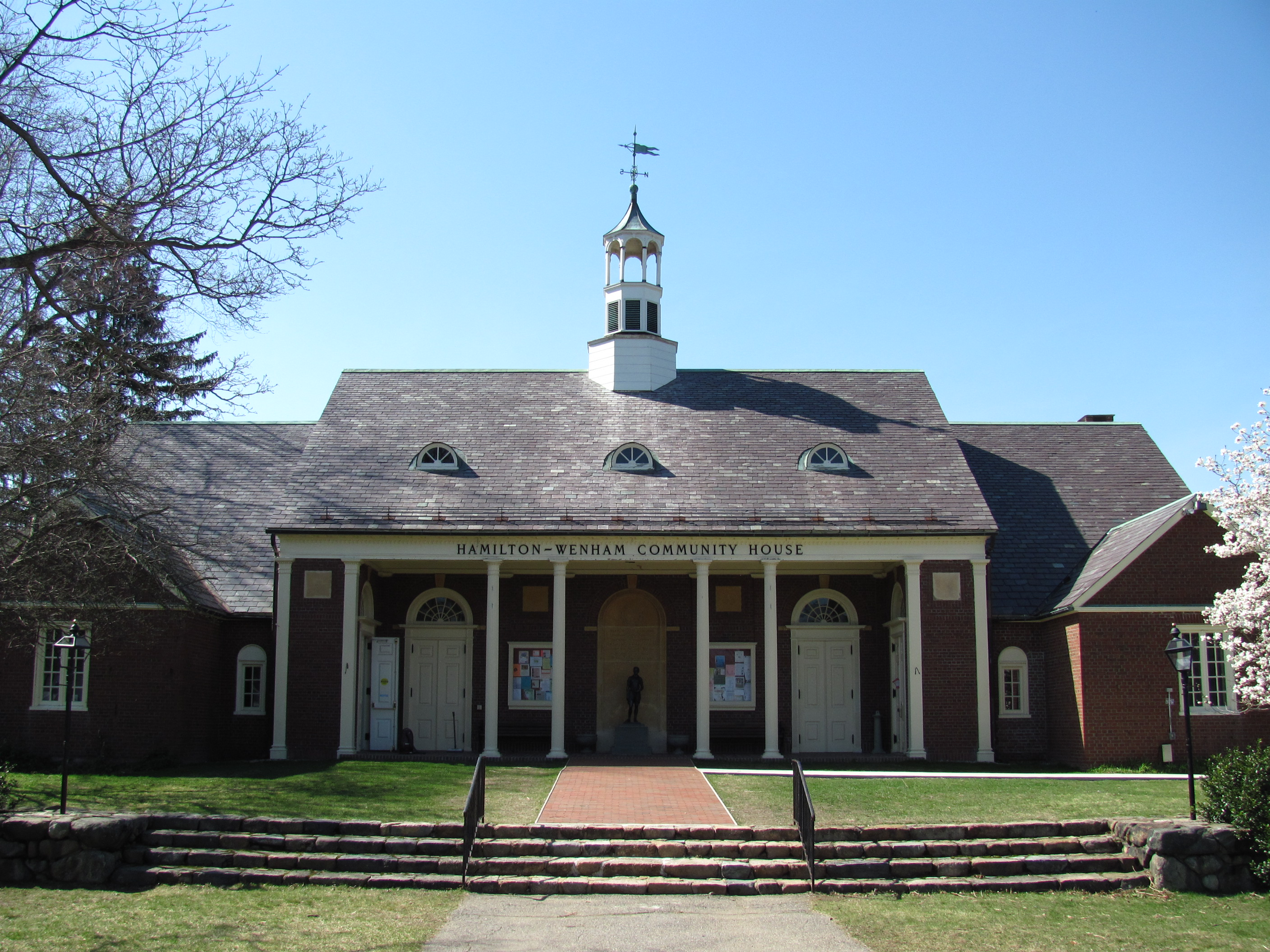

- Location within Massachusetts Location within the United States
- Location: Hamilton, Massachusetts
- Coordinates: 42°36′47″N 70°52′21″W
- Built: 1921
- Architect: Guy Lowell
- Architectural style: Colonial Revival
- NRHP reference No.: 11000265
- Added to NRHP: May 11, 2011

The Community House at 284 Bay Road in Hamilton, Massachusetts is a historic social and civic community building serving the towns of Hamilton and Wenham. The Colonial Revival brick building was built in 1921 to a design by noted Boston architect Guy Lowell, and was listed on the National Register of Historic Places in 2011.

Construction of the building was made possible through the efforts and generosity of George Snell Mandell and Emily Mandell, Hamilton residents and publishers of the Boston Transcript. The Mandells and a group of Hamilton residents worked with Community Service, Inc., a national non-profit that worked to improve recreational facilities. The Mandells purchased the land, in what was then a residential area outside the Hamilton-Wenham business district, and gave it to Hamilton House, Inc., founded to hold title to the property in perpetuity.

The two story building houses an auditorium, sitting room, library, and kitchen on its first floor, and meeting rooms on the second. The basement originally held bowling lanes, a game room, and a men's lounge. Community Service of Wenham and Hamilton, Inc., which manages the building, has over the years offered a wide variety of social, recreational, and educational programs in the facility, and made it available to other community groups as meeting and function space.

The most significant changes to the building have affected the lower level. As bowling rose in popularity, additional lanes were added in a 1934 addition, and also in an adjoining building; the original lanes were converted to a shooting range for law enforcement. With the waning of bowling's popularity, the adjoining building was leased out and eventually sold after being converted to medical offices, and the 1934 addition was converted to meeting space.

== See also ==
- National Register of Historic Places listings in Essex County, Massachusetts
