= Rowley station (MBTA) =

Railway station in Rowley, MA

Rowley
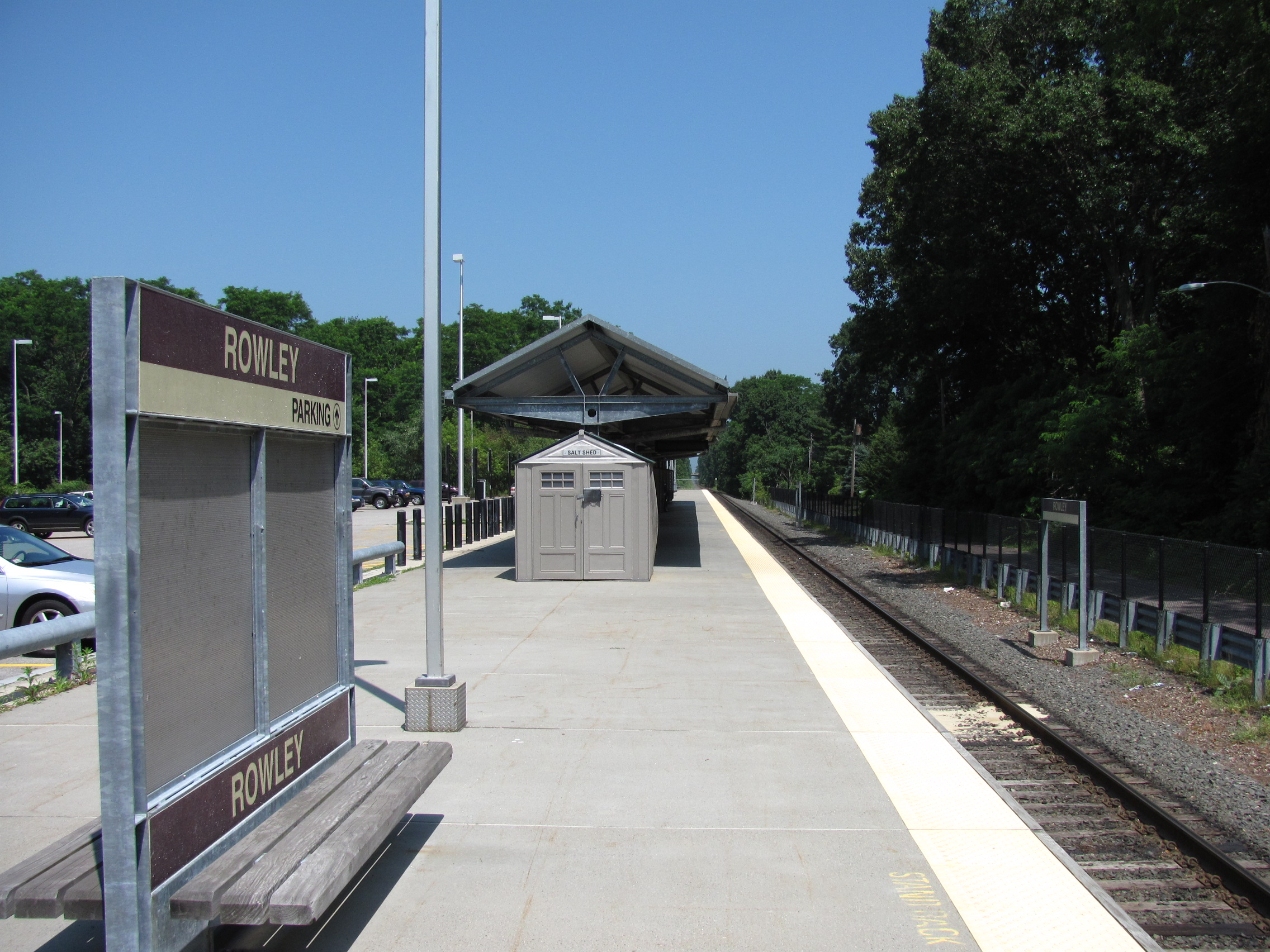
- The platform at Rowley station in 2010

General information
- Location: 70 Railroad Avenue; Rowley, Massachusetts
- Coordinates: 42.7269°N 70.8591°W
- Line: Eastern Route
- Platforms: 1 side platform
- Tracks: 1

Construction
- Parking: Yes
- Accessible: Yes

Other information
- Fare zone: 7

History
- Opened: October 26, 1998

Passengers
- 2024: 62 daily boardings

Services
Preceding station	MBTA	Following station
Ipswich toward North Station	Newburyport/Rockport Line	Newburyport Terminus
Location

Rowley station is an MBTA Commuter Rail station in Rowley, Massachusetts. It is the penultimate station on the Newburyport branch of the Newburyport/Rockport Line.

== History ==
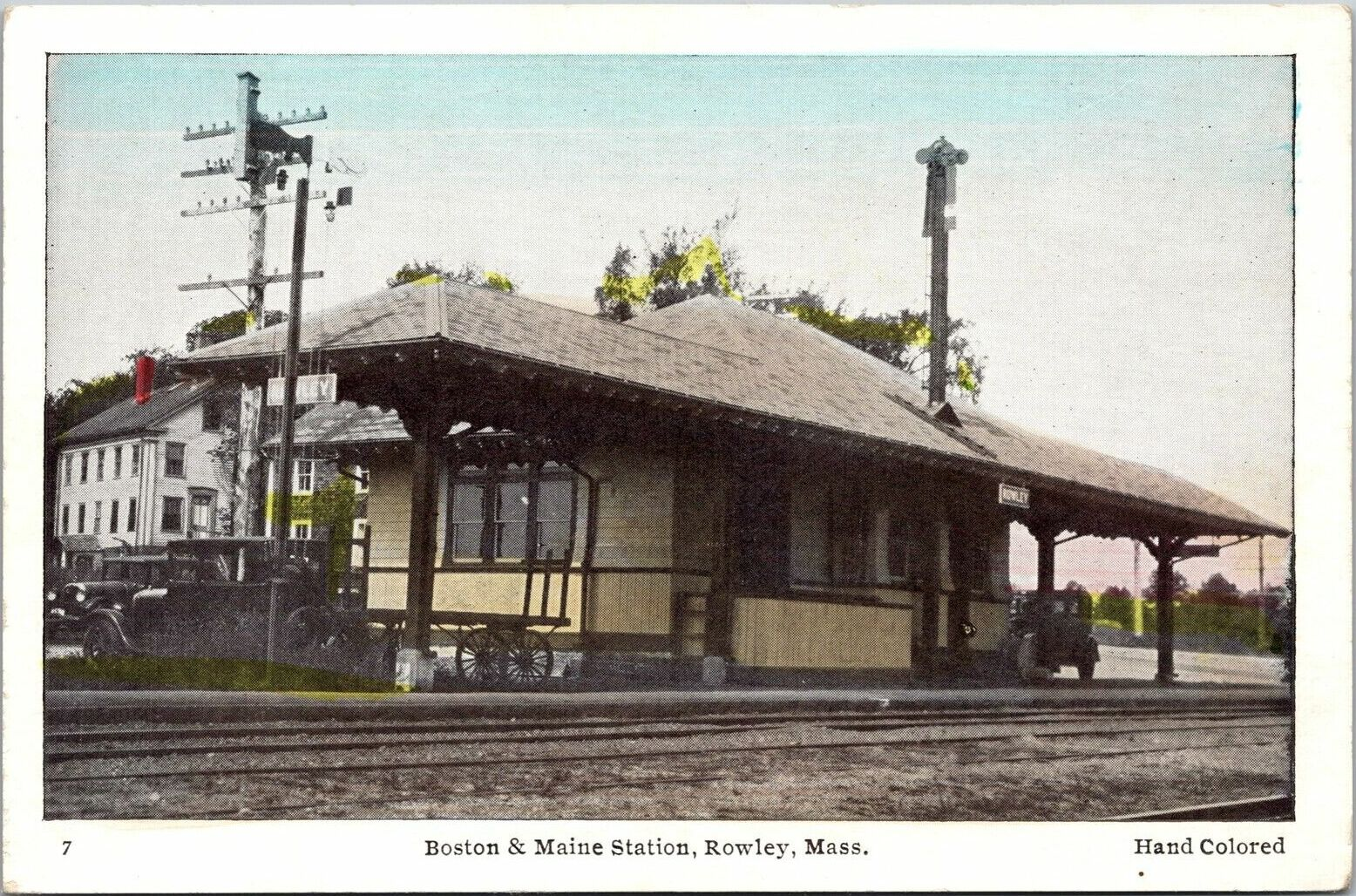
Circa-1920s postcard of Rowley station

The small Boston and Maine Railroad (B&M) station building in Rowley was in disrepair by 1961, and was later demolished. Service to the station ended on April 20, 1967, when the B&M received permission from the Interstate Commerce Commission to discontinue all service on the line (which had been cut back from Portsmouth to Newburyport in January 1965); at that point, service beyond Ipswich consisted of only one daily round trip to North Station. Both Rowley and Newburyport were, at the time, outside the MBTA's service district; the town of Newburyport signed a subsidy agreement with the MBTA, allowing it to continue to receive service, but Rowley did not, and its station closed. Newburyport service continued to run until April 2, 1976.

The current station opened on October 26, 1998, as part of the restoration of service on the Newburyport/Rockport Line between Ipswich and Newburyport. As with Newburyport, the new station was built with a full-length high-level platform, which allows level boarding for all cars of even the longest MBTA trains.
