= Austin Brown House =

Historic house in Massachusetts, United States

- U.S. National Register of Historic Places
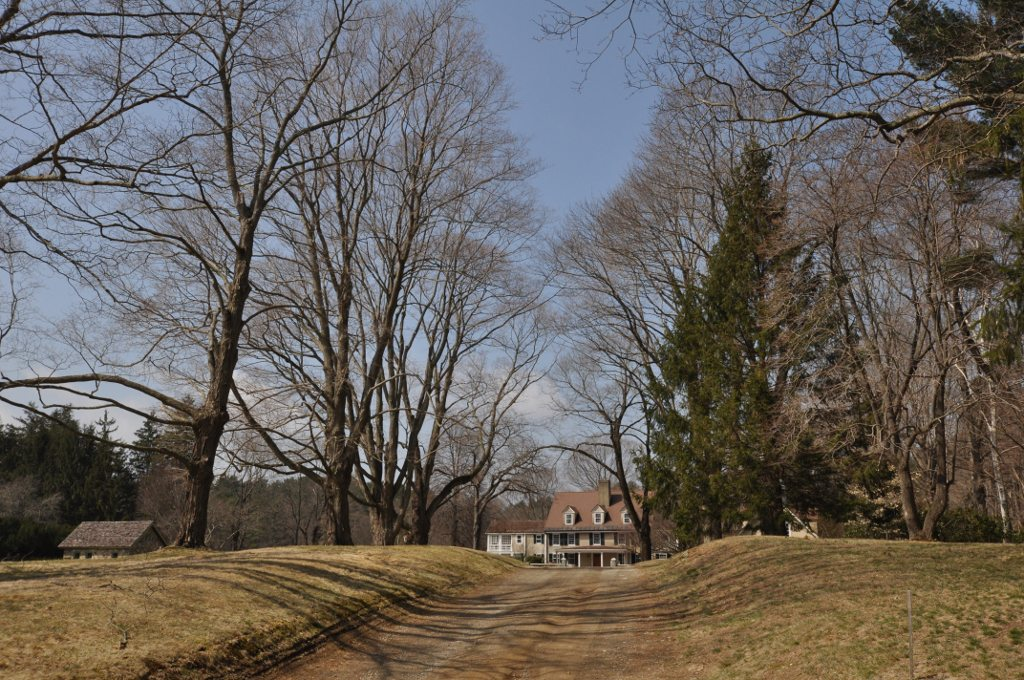

- Location within Massachusetts Location within the United States
- Location: 1028 Bay Road, Hamilton, Massachusetts
- Coordinates: 42°38′26″N 70°50′55″W
- Built: 1725
- Architectural style: Classical Revival, Colonial
- MPS: First Period Buildings of Eastern Massachusetts TR
- NRHP reference No.: 90000222
- Added to NRHP: March 9, 1990

The Austin Brown House is a historic late First Period house in Hamilton, Massachusetts. The oldest part of the house is the central core, a 2 1/2-story structure with a central chimney, was built c. 1725. A leanto section was added to the rear in the 18th century, and an ell was added to the left in the 19th century. At some point the leanto section was raised to a full two stories. In 1907, the house underwent significant restoration and enlargement, adding the right-side wing and replacing the roof with a higher pitch one with three gable dormers. The exterior was stuccoed at this time. Despite these changes, the First Period core of the house is largely preserved.

The house was listed on the National Register of Historic Places in 1990.

== See also ==
- Brown House (Hamilton, Massachusetts), an earlier First Period house
- National Register of Historic Places listings in Essex County, Massachusetts
