= Hamilton Historic District (Hamilton, Massachusetts) =

Historic district in Massachusetts, United States

- U.S. National Register of Historic Places
- U.S. Historic district
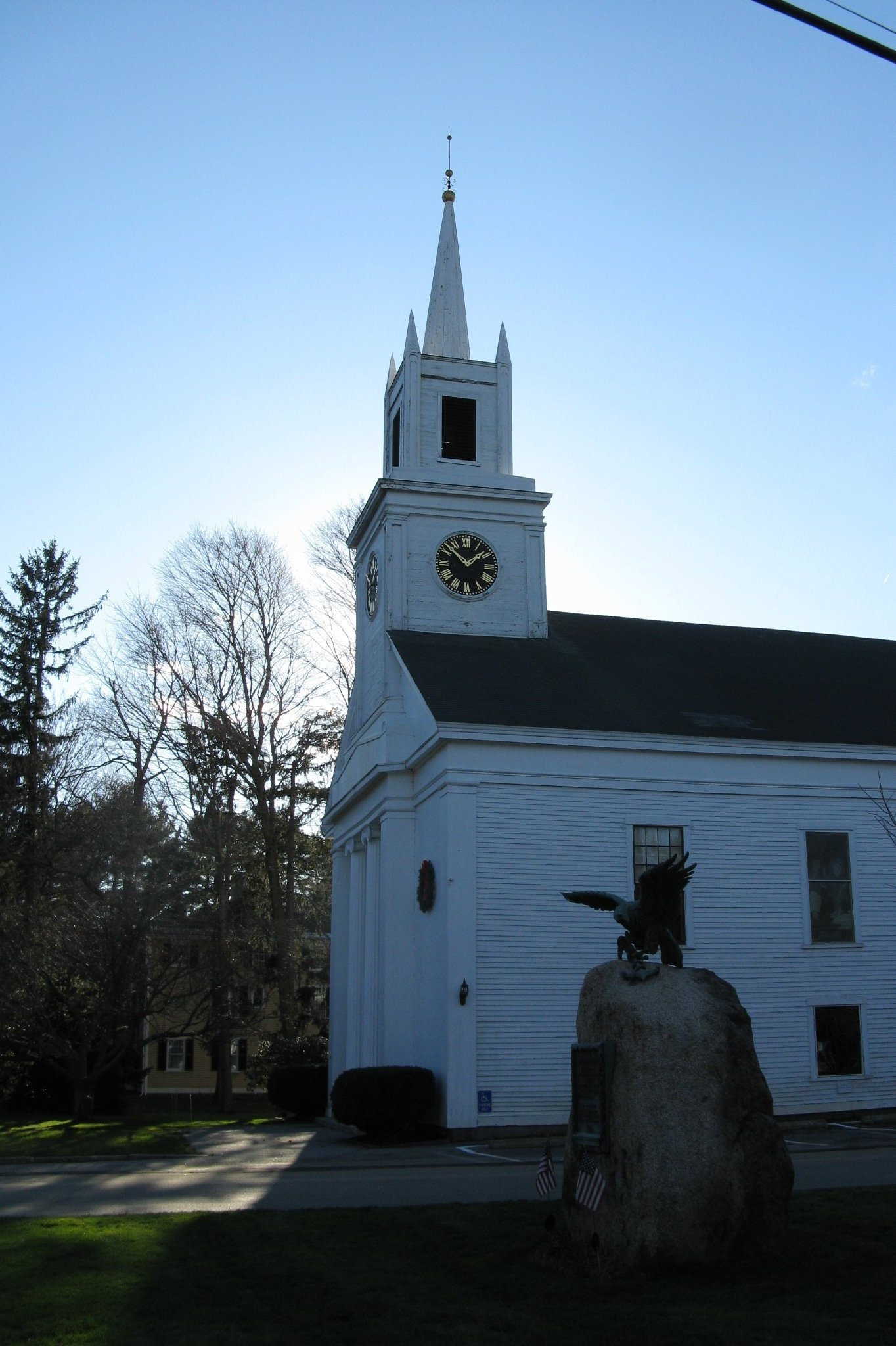
- First Congregational Church

- Location within Massachusetts Location within the United States
- Location: 540-700 and 563-641 Bay Rd., Hamilton, Massachusetts
- Coordinates: 42°37′21″N 70°51′14″W
- Area: 62.1 acres (25.1 ha)
- Built: 1633
- Architectural style: Greek Revival
- NRHP reference No.: 73000300
- Added to NRHP: April 13, 1973

The Hamilton Historic District encompasses the early historic center of Hamilton, Massachusetts. It includes properties at 540-700 and 563-641 Bay Road, extending along the road from Orchard Road in the south to Cutler Road in the north. Numerous Greek Revival buildings are located within the district including the First Congregational Church of Hamilton, built in 1843. The district was added to the National Register of Historic Places in 1973.

== Description and history ==
The town of Hamilton was originally a part of Ipswich, with the first documented settlement in the area in 1638, and Bay Road (now Massachusetts Route 1A) laid out in 1640. It was established as a separate parish in 1714 and incorporated in 1793. The parish center, at the junction of Bay and Cutler Roads, became the town center, with the meeting house, cemetery, and village green all early features. The site of the meeting house is now occupied by the Greek Revival First Congregational Church, which performs the same religious function. Hamilton's 1898 Colonial Revival Town Hall also stands in the district. The district has been relatively little altered since the mid-19th century, as evidenced by maps of that and later periods.

The historic district extends along Bay Road, from its junction with Cutler Road in the north to Orchard Road in the south. Twenty of its primary buildings are residences, with a few early 18th-century Georgian houses and a larger number of 19th-century Greek Revival houses. The oldest house, a saltbox built c. 1700, stands at 638 Bay Road. Besides the church and town hall, the other non-residential buildings include the village store (c. 1840), and a cobbler's shop that has been converted to residential use. All of the buildings are of frame construction, and almost all are finished in clapboards; one of the most recently built houses (1900) is finished in stucco.

== See also ==
- National Register of Historic Places listings in Essex County, Massachusetts
