= Emeline Patch House =

Historic house in Massachusetts, United States

- U.S. National Register of Historic Places
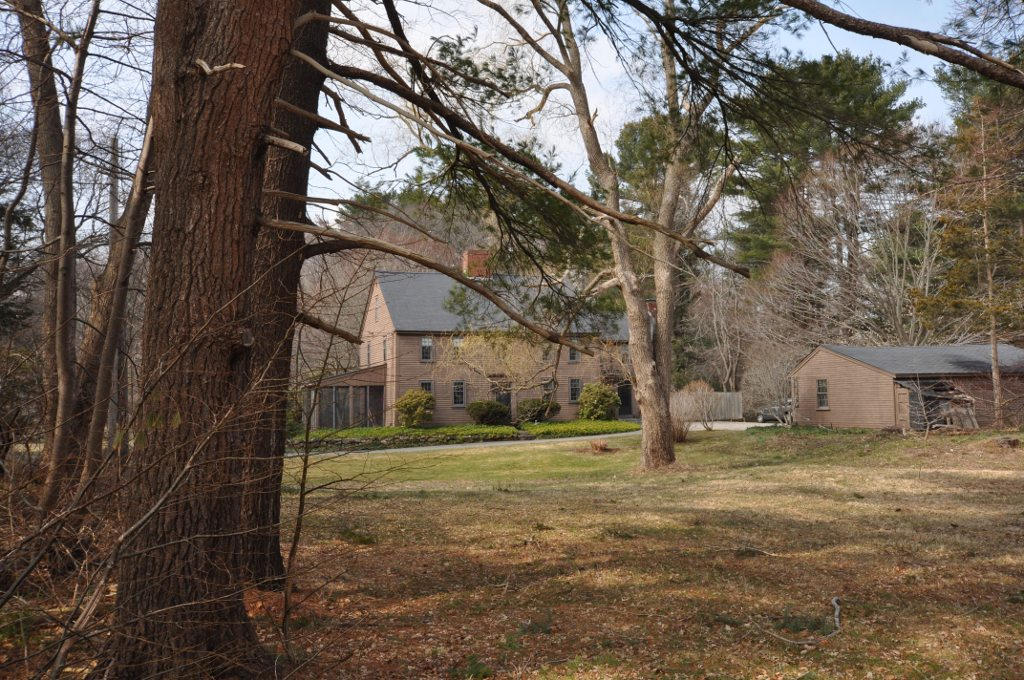

- Location within Massachusetts Location within the United States
- Location: 918 Bay Road, Hamilton, Massachusetts
- Coordinates: 42°38′42″N 70°50′42″W
- Built: 1725
- Architectural style: Colonial
- MPS: First Period Buildings of Eastern Massachusetts TR
- NRHP reference No.: 90000221
- Added to NRHP: March 9, 1990

The Emeline Patch House is a historic late First Period house in Hamilton, Massachusetts. The 2.5-story wood-frame house was built in stages, the first being the front rooms of the house along with the central chimney. Later in the 18th century, the rear rooms were added and the roof was rebuilt. In the 19th century, a small ell was added to the right side. The house was moved back from the road around 1940.

The house was listed on the National Register of Historic Places in 1990.

== See also ==
- National Register of Historic Places listings in Essex County, Massachusetts
