= Hamilton, Massachusetts =

- Town
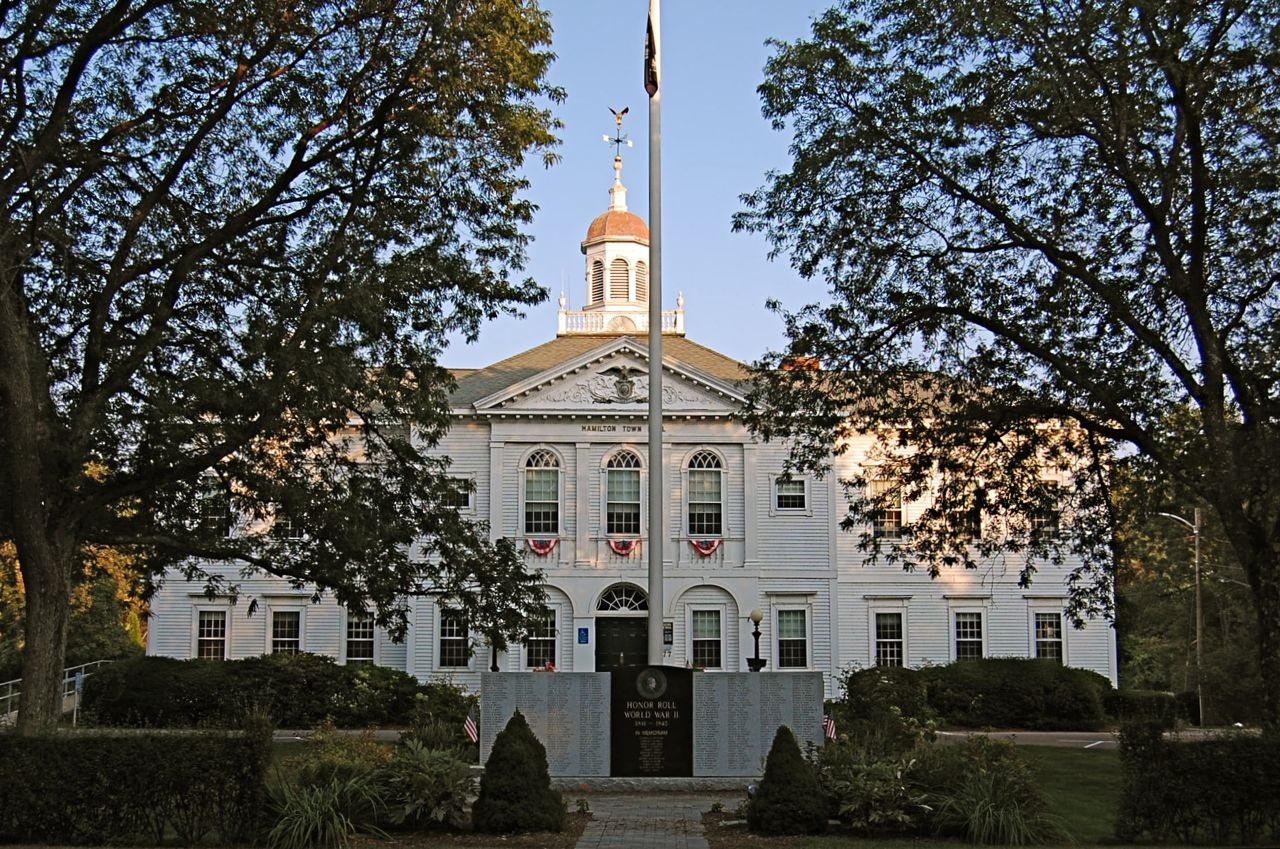
- Hamilton Town Hall

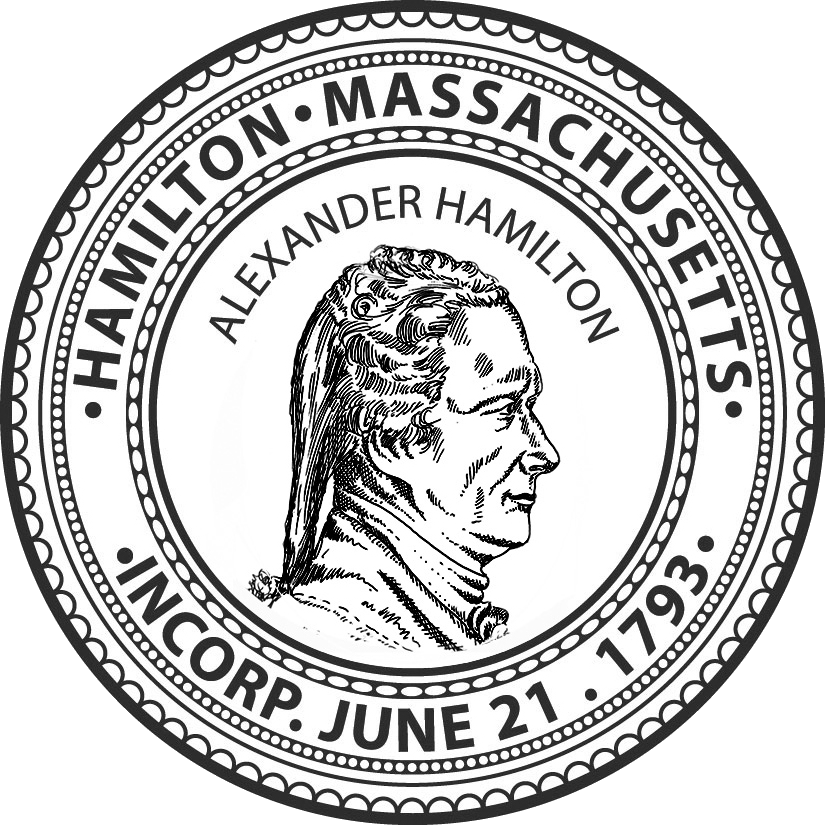
- Seal

- Location in Essex County and the state of Massachusetts.
- Coordinates: 42°37′10.95″N 70°51′17.24″W
- Country: United States
- State: Massachusetts
- County: Essex
- Settled: 1638; 388 years ago
- Incorporated: 1793; 233 years ago

Government
  - Type: Open town meeting

Area
  - Total: 14.9 sq mi (38.6 km^{2})
  - Land: 14.2 sq mi (36.7 km^{2})
  - Water: 0.73 sq mi (1.9 km^{2})
- Elevation: 49 ft (15 m)

Population (2020)
  - Total: 7,561
  - Density: 534/sq mi (206/km^{2})
- Time zone: UTC−5 (Eastern)
  - Summer (DST): UTC−4 (Eastern)
- ZIP Codes: 01936 (Hamilton); 01982 (South Hamilton)
- Area code: 351/978
- FIPS code: 25-27900
- GNIS feature ID: 0619446
- Website: www.hamiltonma.gov

Hamilton is a town in the eastern central portion of Essex County in eastern Massachusetts, United States. At the 2020 census, it had a population of 7,561. Notably, the town has no industrially-zoned land.

Although Hamilton is a landlocked town in the North Shore region of Massachusetts, its proximity to it provides easy access to the Atlantic seashore with its reservations, beaches and boating.

Hamilton is closely tied to neighboring Wenham, sharing a school system, library, recreation department, and commuter rail station.

== History ==
In June 1638, John Winthrop the Younger, son of the founder of the Massachusetts Bay Colony, bought most of present-day Essex County from Masconomet, chief of the Agawam Indians, for the sum of twenty English pounds. A memorial stone on Sagamore Hill in southeastern Hamilton marks where Masconomet was buried with his gun and tomahawk around 1658.

Hamilton was first settled in 1638 and was originally a section of Ipswich known as "The Hamlet". The first recorded land grant in the Hamlet was Matthew Whipple's farm, dated 1638. Three years later the new stagecoach road from Boston to Newburyport (Bay Road) was laid out through the Whipple land. Other early settlers of the Hamlet, including the Appletons, Winthrops, Lamsons, and Dodges, were attracted by countryside similar to the English farms and estates they had left behind.

The town was incorporated on June 21, 1793, and named for Alexander Hamilton, whose portrait became the town seal in 1903. With the arrival of the Boston and Maine Railroad in 1839, the population center moved gradually southward toward the depot.

The farm village proved to be an attractive location for Boston groups seeking land for recreation and renewal. A Methodist ministers' association first held a camp meeting at Asbury Grove in 1859. In the 1880s, the Myopia Hunt Club, which had been named in jest for its nearsighted founders, moved from Winchester, Massachusetts, to the Gibney Farm in Hamilton. Beginning as a lawn tennis and baseball club, it turned to polo, the hunt, and golf as members built large summer estates in the area. Myopia donated the site for the General George S. Patton Memorial Park to the town of Hamilton. The park continues to be a recreation center for the town.

In 1921, the Mandell family built the Community House in memory of the eight men in Hamilton and Wenham who died in military service during World War I, including their son, Sam. They commissioned Guy Lowell, a respected architect of Boston and New York, to design the building, and gave the Community House in trust for the use of the residents of both towns. Although in its early days the Community House offered activities such as bowling and a men's smoking room, it now features a wide range of classes and activities for all ages.

The town also has a rich equestrian heritage, which remains strong due to the influence of the many horse farms and the Myopia Hunt Club, which holds frequent equestrian events. Motorists in Hamilton often share secondary roads with horse and pony riders.

In 2021, Hamilton became the first town in Massachusetts to mandate composting.

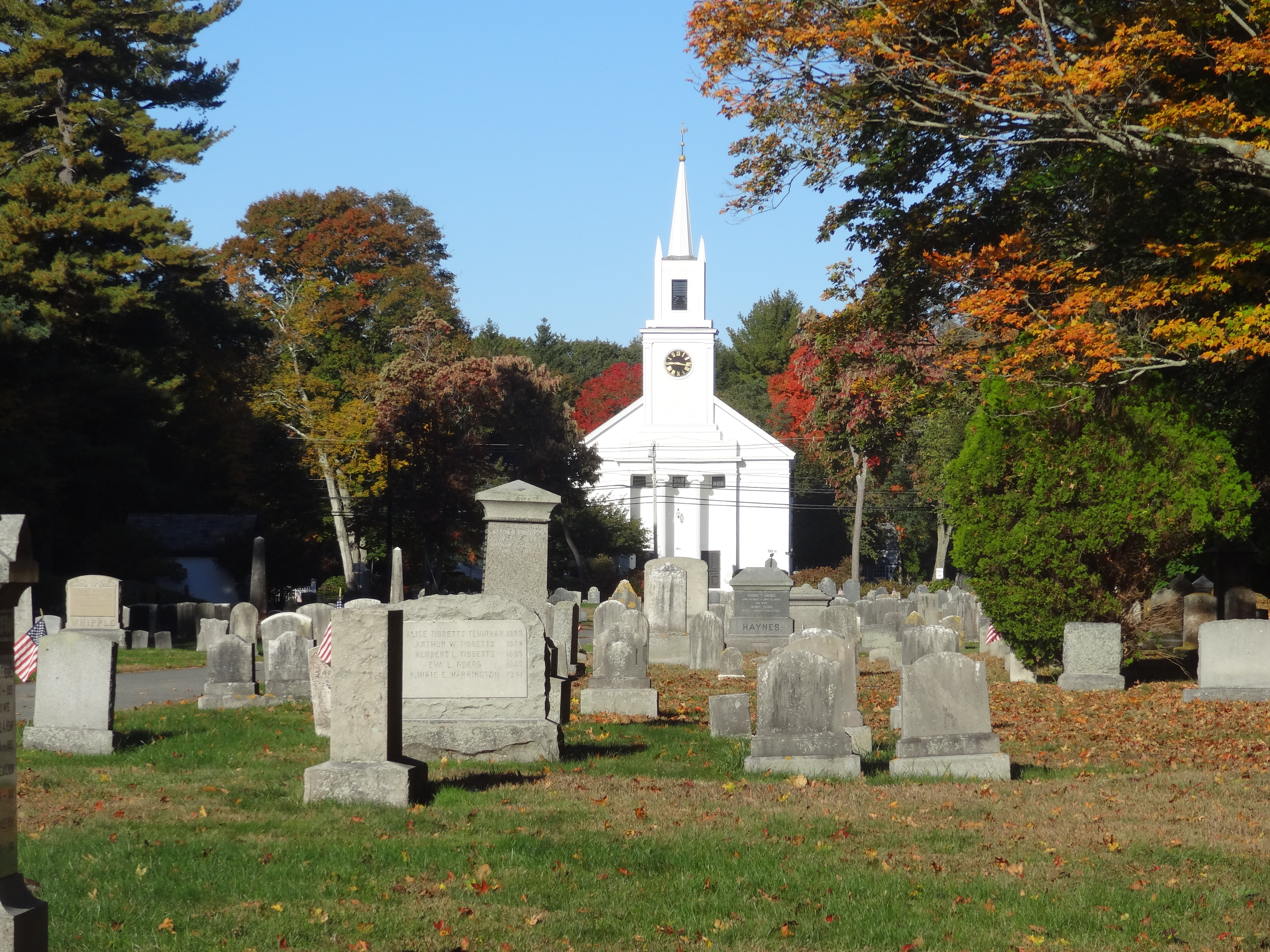
View of First Congregational Church from Hamilton Cemetery

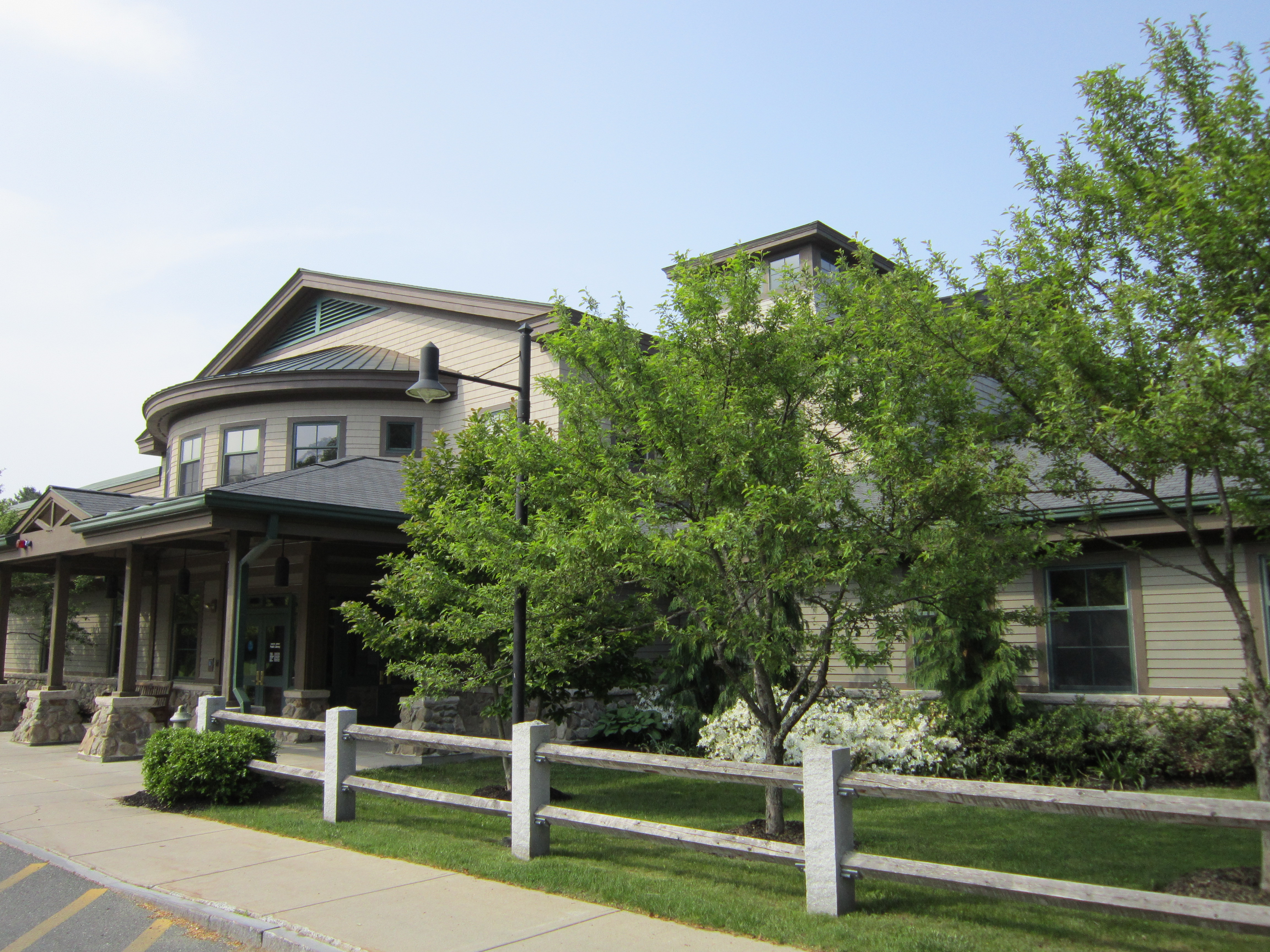
Hamilton-Wenham Public Library

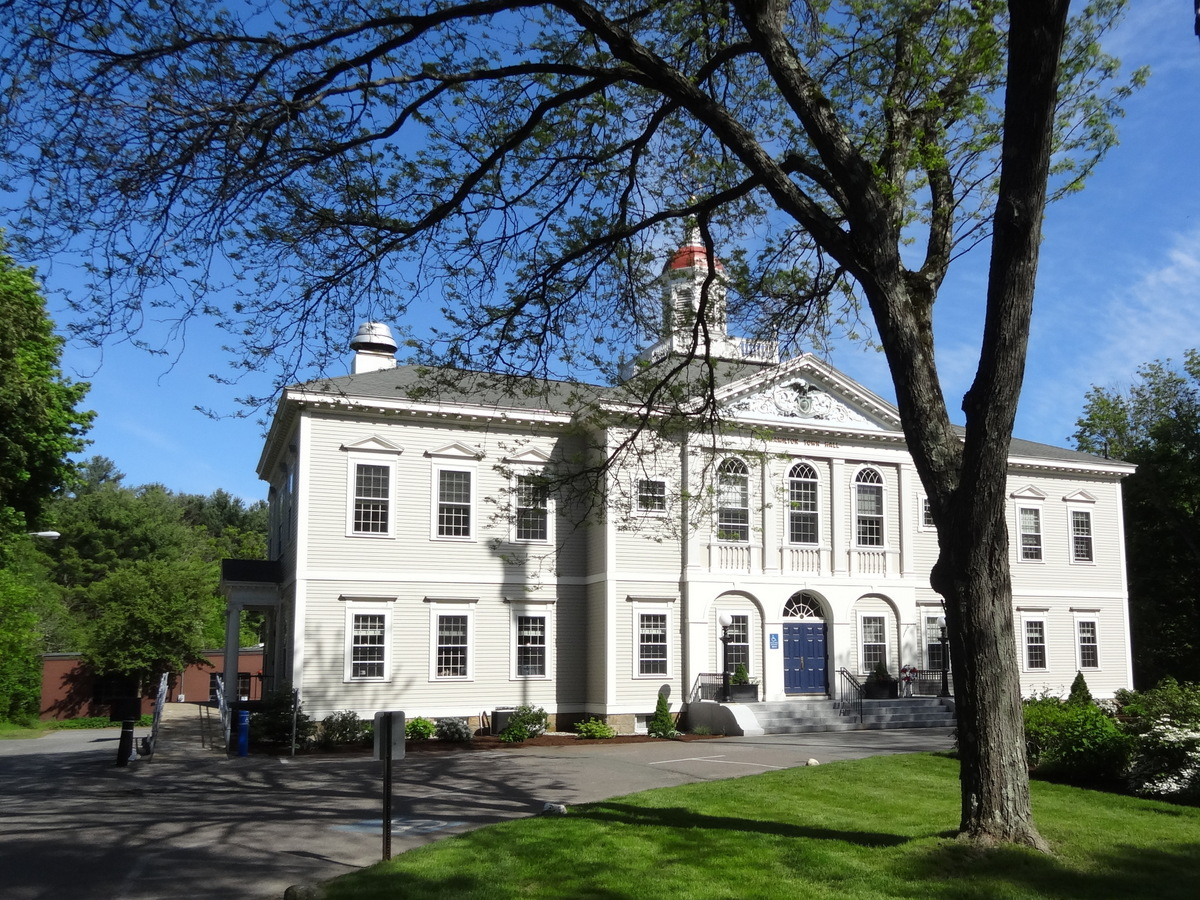
Hamilton Town Hall Hamilton, Massachusetts

== Geography ==
According to the United States Census Bureau, the town has a total area of 14.9 square miles (38.6 km^{2}), of which 14.2 square miles (36.7 km^{2}) is land and 0.73 square miles (1.9 km^{2}), or 4.89%, is water. Hamilton lies 5 miles (8 km) inland from Massachusetts Bay, and both the eastern and western portion of town are bordered by water, with the Ipswich River to the west and Chebacco Lake and several other small ponds to the east. The highest point in town is found on Blueberry Hill in Bradley Palmer State Park, with an elevation of at least 215 feet (66 m), according to the most recent (2011-2012) USGS 7.5-minute topographical map. Several areas of town are protected, including Myopia Hunt Club and parts of Bradley Palmer State Park, Appleton Farm Grass Rides, and the Ipswich River Wildlife Sanctuary.

Patton Park, a center of activity for the town in downtown Hamilton, was named after General George S. Patton.

Hamilton is bordered by Ipswich to the north, Essex to the east, Manchester-by-the-Sea to the southeast, Wenham to the south, and Topsfield to the west. It is located 12 miles (19 km) south of Newburyport, 8 miles (13 km) north of Salem and 23 miles (37 km) northeast of Boston.

== Transportation ==
- MBTA Commuter Rail provides service from Boston's North Station with the Hamilton/Wenham station on its Newburyport branch of the Newburyport/Rockport Line. The MBTA Commuter Rail is within walking distance of the town hall, homes and the many small shops in town.
- There are no freeways within town; Route 128 provides the nearest access, in Beverly. Route 1A passes through the center of town, and Route 22 passes through the eastern corner of town between Wenham and its eastern terminus in Essex.
- The nearest airport is Beverly Municipal Airport, and the nearest national and international air service can be found at Boston's Logan International Airport.

== Demographics ==
Historical population
Year	Pop.	±%
1850	889	—
1860	789	−11.2%
1870	790	+0.1%
1880	935	+18.4%
1890	961	+2.8%
1900	1,614	+68.0%
1910	1,749	+8.4%
1920	1,631	−6.7%
1930	2,044	+25.3%
1940	2,037	−0.3%
1950	2,764	+35.7%
1960	5,488	+98.6%
1970	6,373	+16.1%
1980	6,960	+9.2%
1990	7,280	+4.6%
2000	8,315	+14.2%
2010	7,764	−6.6%
2020	7,561	−2.6%
2024*	7,670	+1.4%
* = population estimate. Source: United States census records and Population Estimates Program data.

As of the census of 2000, there were 8,315 people, 2,668 households, and 2,142 families residing in the town. (Update: The population was 8251 in 2009, down less than 100 from the 8,315 of the 2000 census. Based on the total area, both land and water, the density is therefore 553.8 persons per square mile.) As of the 2000 census, there were 2,825 housing units at an average density of 193.5 per square mile (74.7/km^{2}). The racial makeup of the town was 94.19% White, 0.47% African American, 0.17% Native American, 4.26% Asian, 0.05% Pacific Islander, 0.34% from other races, and 0.53% from two or more races. Hispanic or Latino of any race were 0.99% of the population.

There were 2,668 households, out of which 66.6% had children under the age of 18 living with them, 71.1% were married couples living together, 7.3% had a female householder with no husband present, and 19.7% were non-families. Of all households, 15.7% were made up of individuals, and 7.0% had someone living alone who was 65 years of age or older. The average household size was 2.87 and the average family size was 3.22.

In the town, the population was spread out, with 27.4% under the age of 18, 5.9% from 18 to 24, 33.3% from 25 to 44, 23.0% from 45 to 64, and 10.4% who were 65 years of age or older. The median age was 36 years. For every 100 females, there were 96.8 males. For every 100 females age 18 and over, there were 95.1 males.

The median income for a household in the town was $116,900. The per capita income for the town was $50,599. About 7.4% of the population were below the poverty line.

== Education ==
Hamilton is esteemed for the regional school district it shares with neighboring Wenham, and Hamilton is where the majority of the schools in the Hamilton-Wenham Regional School District are located. The town serves two elementary schools; the Winthrop, and Cutler schools. The town only has one middle school; the Miles River Middle School. High School students attend Hamilton-Wenham Regional High School.

The Pingree School, a private secondary school, is located on the historic Pingree Family Estate in Hamilton.

Hamilton is also home to Gordon-Conwell Theological Seminary, an interdenominational evangelical theological seminary.

== Notable people ==
- Bo Burnham, comedian, musician, actor, and filmmaker
- Michael Carter-Williams, basketball player
- David M. Kelly, lawyer and politician
- Masconomet, Native American chief
- William J. McGarry, Jesuit and president of Boston College
- David Morse, actor
- Kevin O'Connor, television host
- George S. Patton, U.S. Army general (Note: Known for his exploits in World War II, Patton resided in Hamilton. This is the reason for Patton Park, a park made famous by the installation of an M4 Sherman full-sized World War II tank on which many children and young adults play. At one point, children were able to play inside the tank until the late 1960s when a fire was set inside. After this, the hatches were welded shut.)
- George S. Patton IV, U.S. Army general and son of the above (Note: In the years after his 1980 retirement from the Army with the rank of Major General, Patton turned a Hamilton estate owned by his late father into the 250 acres (1.0 km^{2}) Green Meadows Farm, where he named the fields in honor of Vietnam soldiers who died under his command.)
- Justin Rennicks, soccer player
- John Shea, archaeologist
- Marcus Zegarowski, former Creighton University basketball player and NBA player
- George von Lengerke Meyer, U.S. ambassador to Italy and Russia, Secretary of the Navy, and Postmaster General

== Historic places ==
- Asbury Grove
- Austin Brown House
- Brown House
- Emeline Patch House
- Hamilton Historic District
- Myopia Hunt Club, site of the U.S. Open in 1898, 1901, 1905, and 1908
- Woodberry-Quarrels House

== General and cited references ==
- Dodge, Barnabas (1788). "Hamilton". Essex County 1795. salemdeeds.com. Archived from the original on 24 February 2012.
- Felt, Joseph Barlow (1834). History of Ipswich, Essex, and Hamilton. Cambridge, Mass.: C. Folsom.
