= Newburyport station =

Railway station in Newburyport, MA

Newburyport
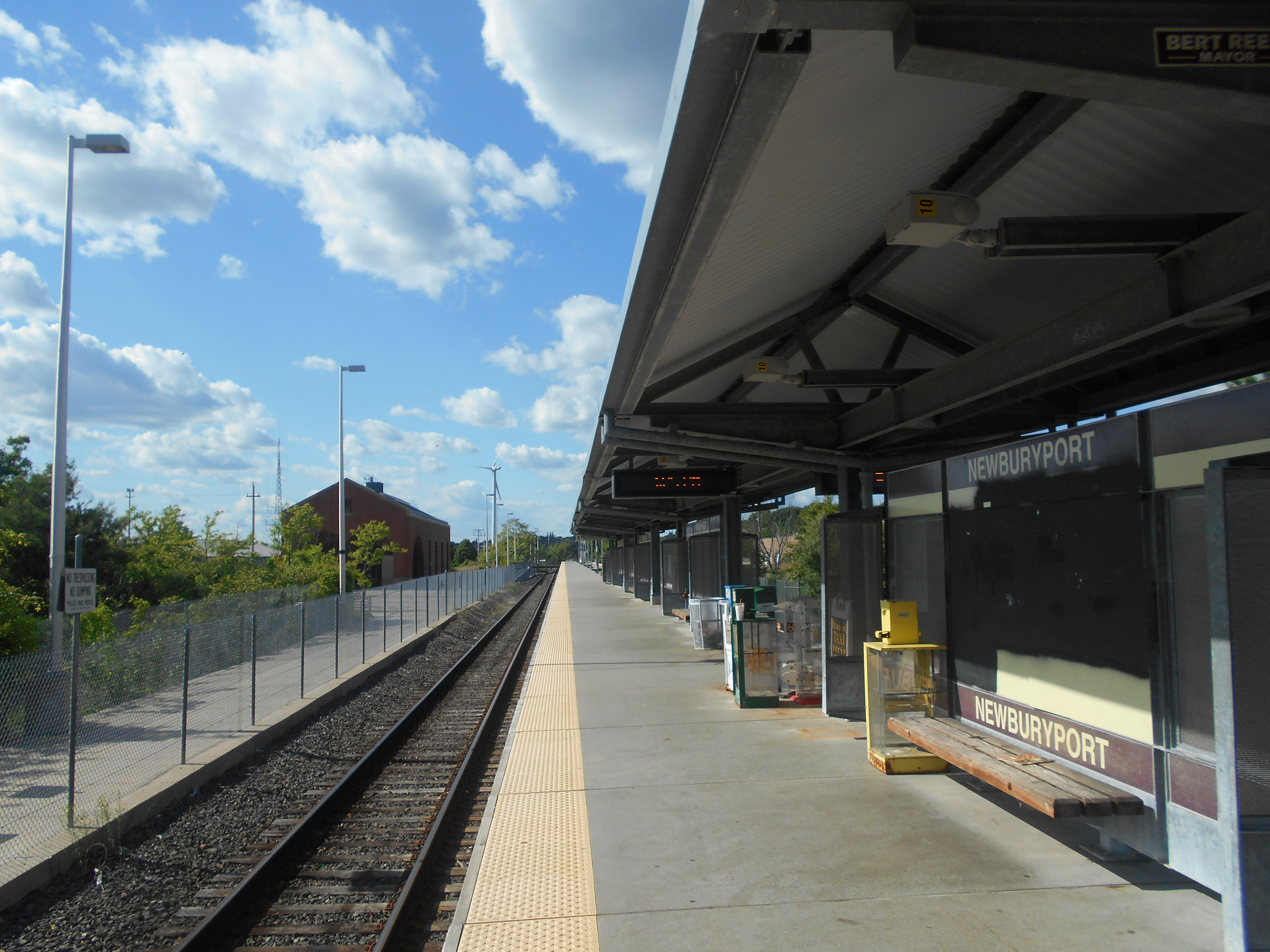
- Platform at Newburyport station, facing outbound; the 1998-built station building is at left

General information
- Location: 25 Boston Way; Newburyport, Massachusetts
- Coordinates: 42.79815°N 70.87815°W
- Line: Eastern Route
- Platforms: 1 island platform
- Tracks: 2
- Connections: MVRTA: 11, 19, 20

Construction
- Parking: 814 spaces ($4.00 fee)
- Cycle facilities: 22 spaces
- Accessible: Yes

Other information
- Fare zone: 8

History
- Opened: 1840; October 28, 1998
- Closed: April 2, 1976

Passengers
- 2024: 349 daily boardings

Services
Preceding station	MBTA	Following station
Rowley toward North Station	Newburyport/Rockport Line	Terminus
Former services
Preceding station	Boston and Maine Railroad	Following station
Rowley toward Boston	Eastern Route	Salisbury toward Portland
Location

Newburyport station is an MBTA Commuter Rail station in Newburyport, Massachusetts. It is located between Parker Street and U.S. Route 1 south of downtown Newburyport, and serves the Newburyport/Rockport Line. The station is the terminus of the Newburyport Branch of the line, with three parking lots totalling over 800 spaces. The Clipper City Rail Trail, running along the former right-of-way, connects the station to the town center. Newburyport station is fully accessible.

== History ==
=== Former station ===
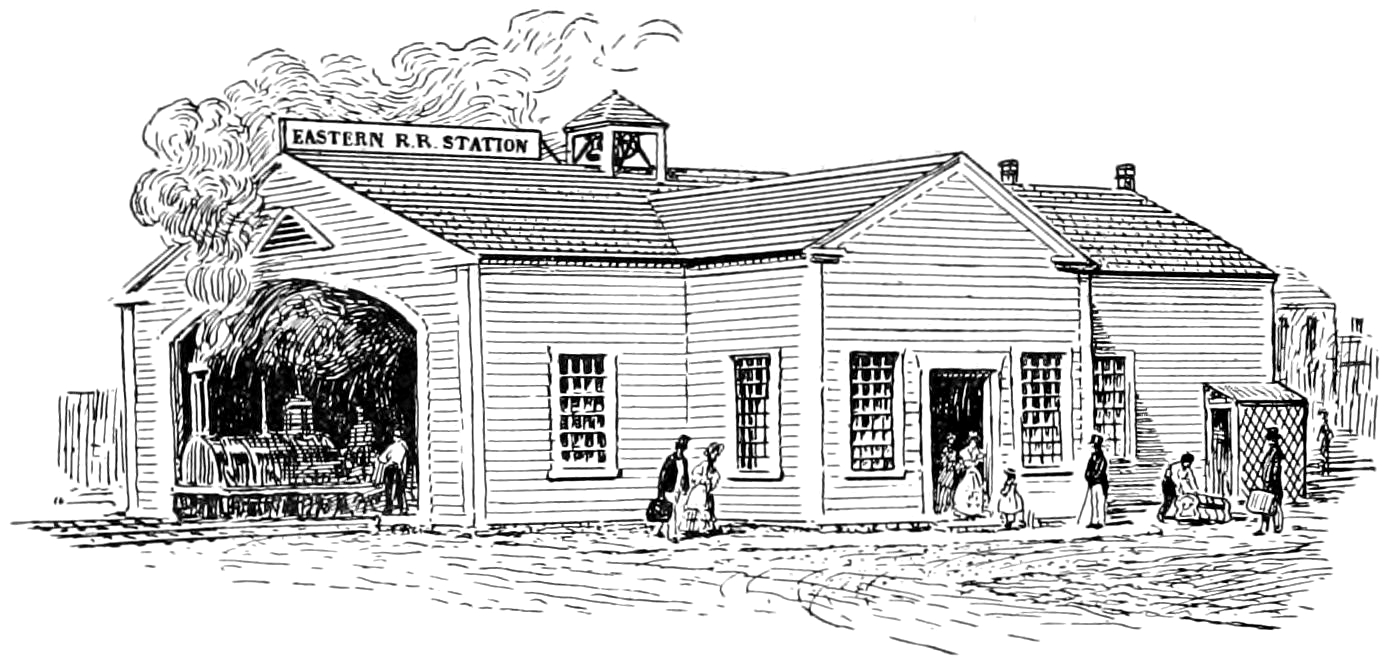
An early woodcutting of the first (1840-built) station

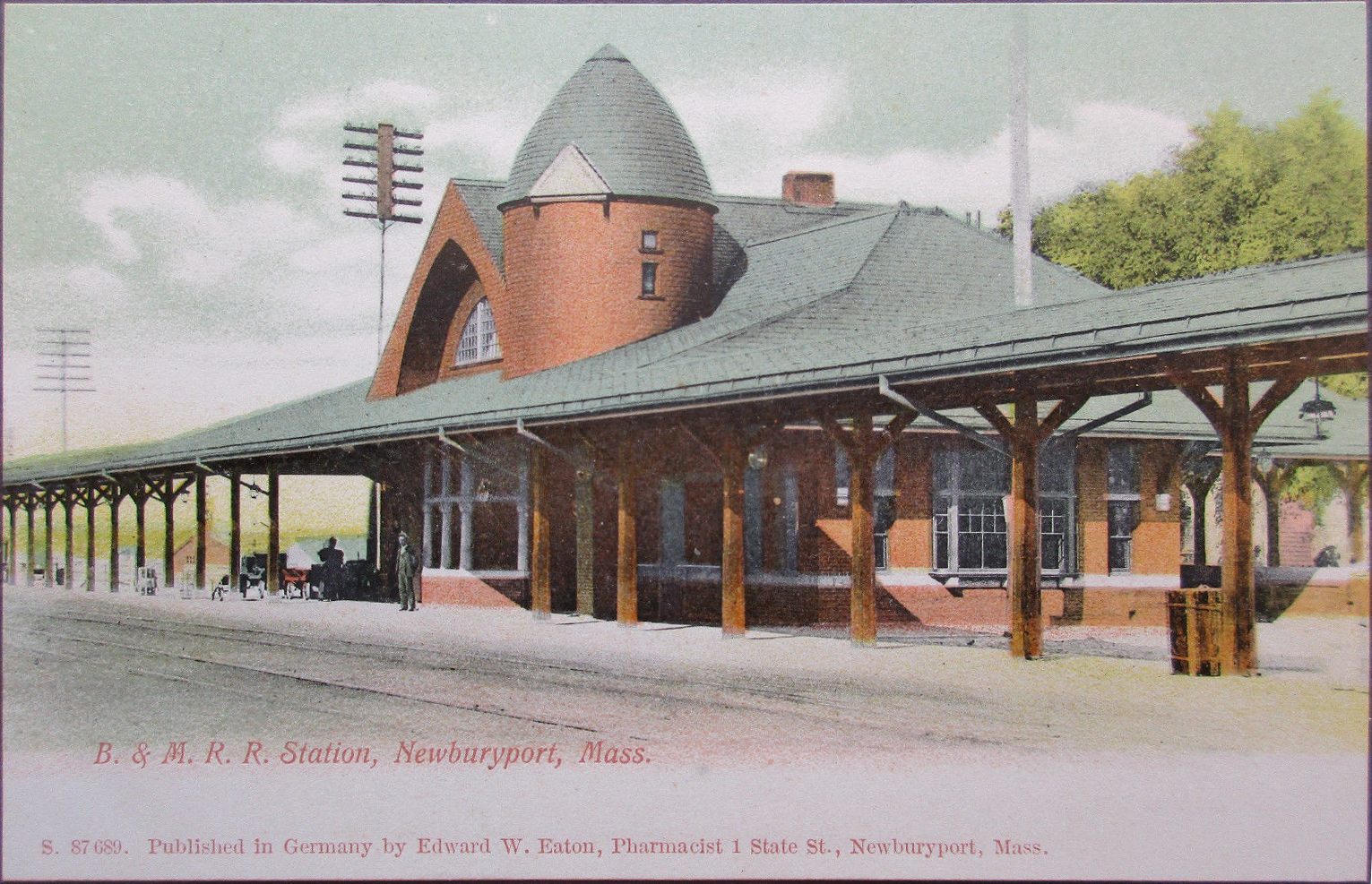
The third (1892-built) Newburyport station in the early 20th century

The Eastern Railroad's original Newburyport station was located in downtown Newburyport, near Washington Street. Opened in 1840, it was a small wooden structure with a two-track trainshed. It was replaced by a larger brick station just to the north in March 1854. The 1854 station was destroyed by fire on March 3, 1892; a large brick structure with a turret was constructed on the same spot.

By 1962 the station was privately owned and in poor condition, with deep potholes in the parking lot and a station clock running more than an hour late. Service on the Boston and Maine Railroad's Eastern Route was cut back from Portsmouth, New Hampshire on January 4, 1965, as part of a general discontinuance of the railroad's interstate service. The only service past Hamilton/Wenham (after June 28, past Ipswich) was a single round trip to Newburyport with an intermediate stop at Rowley.

On April 20, 1967, Newburyport began partially subsidizing the service; Rowley did not, and its station was abandoned. The final day of Newburyport service was April 1, 1976, as the town declined to continue the subsidy; service was cut back to Ipswich. That December, the MBTA bought the B&M's commuter rail assets, including the Eastern Route up to the New Hampshire state line. Freight service continued until 1984, though the line was not officially abandoned until 1984.

=== Modern station ===
After "one of the briefest abandonments on record", the line was rebuilt by the MBTA, and service to Newburyport and Rowley was reinstated on October 26, 1998. A full-length high-level platform - the MBTA's standard for new construction on routes not constrained by the need to accommodate freight operations along the same route - was built for accessibility. Since Newburyport is the terminus, trains may pull into either of the island platform's two tracks. A four-track layover yard was constructed south of the Newburyport Turnpike.

The MBTA originally planned to rebuild the station at the former downtown site. However, at the city's insistence, the new station was located 1.0 mile (1.6 km) to the south, where parking and the layover yard could be easily built. The station is "surrounded by nothing but swamps and warehouses" and isolated from downtown; a shuttle bus service was discontinued in 2004.

As part of the $2.1 million restoration project, a brick waiting room was built west of the tracks, incorporating two arches from the Newburyport YMCA building, which had burned in 1987. The building was complete by 1998, but it and the small coffee shop inside did not open until February 11, 2002. The coffee shop later closed; a Mexican restaurant opened in the space in August 2016.
