= Woodberry (surname) =

Woodberry is a surname. Notable people with the surname include:

- Billy Woodberry, American film director
- Dennis Woodberry (born 1961), American football player
- George Edward Woodberry (1855–1930), American literary critic and poet
- J. Dudley Woodberry (born 1934), American scholar and Protestant missionary
- Joan Woodberry (1921–2010), Australian writer
- London Woodberry (born 1991), American soccer player
- Rosa Louise Woodberry (1869–1932), American journalist, educator
- Steve Woodberry (born 1971), American basketball player
- Terry Woodberry (born 1963), American soccer player
