= Woodberry-Quarrels House =

Historic house in Massachusetts, United States

- U.S. National Register of Historic Places
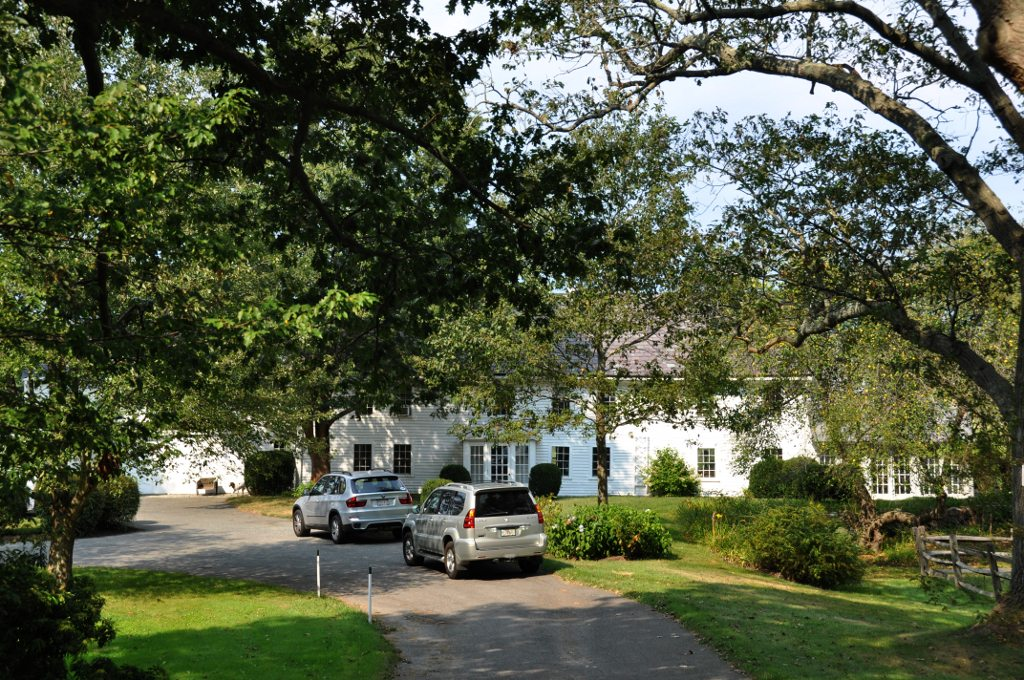

- Location within Massachusetts Location within the United States
- Location: 180 Bridge Street, Hamilton, Massachusetts
- Coordinates: 42°36′55″N 70°50′42″W
- Built: 1690
- Architectural style: Colonial
- MPS: First Period Buildings of Eastern Massachusetts TR
- NRHP reference No.: 90000224
- Added to NRHP: March 9, 1990

The Woodberry-Quarrels House is a historic First Period house in Hamilton, Massachusetts. The oldest part of this 2.5-story, seven-bay wood-frame house is the central doorway and the rooms to its right, which were built c. 1690 along with a central chimney that was probably removed during Federal-period alterations. Later in the First Period rooms to the left of the entry were added, and there have been a series of alterations and additions since then. The First Period core of the house survived the major Federal-era changes, and the house retains much decorative work from that period.

The house was listed on the National Register of Historic Places in 1990.

== See also ==
- List of the oldest buildings in the United States
- National Register of Historic Places listings in Essex County, Massachusetts
