= Asbury Grove =

Human settlement in Massachusetts, US

Coordinates: 42°37′29.0″N 70°53′14.7″W

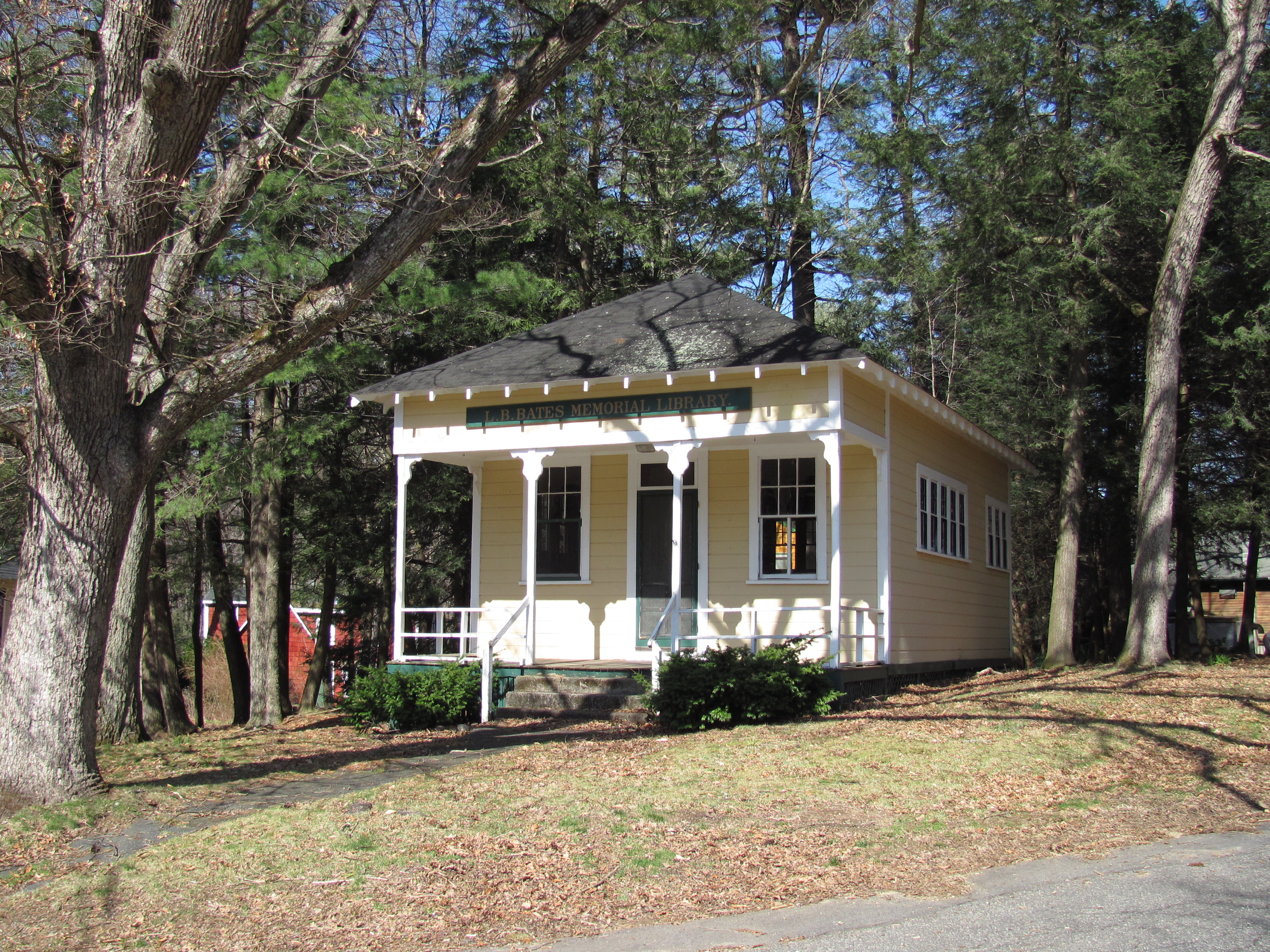
L. B. Bates Memorial Library

Asbury Grove, located in Hamilton, Massachusetts, was formed during the camp meeting religious movement popular in the mid-19th century. Originally set on seventy-five acres of land, the camp was founded by the Methodist church in 1857. Ten of the original seventy-five acres were purchased from Joseph Dodge, a local farmer. This land included a farmhouse, which later became the Superintendent's Cottage.

The camp grounds were used in the summer months by Methodist congregations from towns along the North Shore of Massachusetts (such as Lynn, Groveland, and Reading). The camp was named after Bishop Francis Asbury, a prominent member of the Methodist camp meeting circuit in the early 19th century.

The camp was listed on the National Register of Historic Places as the Asbury Grove Historic District in 2009.

== Historical context ==
Camp meetings can be traced the back to Kentucky's "Great Revival" in 1800. The movement spread to the southern United States and other parts of the country thereafter. Meetings typically lasted several days and included intensive services, prayer, and bible study. Although Asbury Grove is a Methodist community, other religious groups such as the Presbyterians and Baptists also joined this movement.

Although Asbury Grove was not the first camp in Massachusetts (it was preceded by camps on Cape Cod and Wesleyan Grove on Martha's Vineyard) it was created specifically so that two dozen Methodist churches of the Lynn and Boston districts could have easier access to revival meetings.

== Early years ==
The first meeting at Asbury Grove was held in the third week of August, 1859, and attracted 2,000 people at its inception. Some reports state that by the end of that first week, the attendance had grown to nearly 12,000. As with other camp meetings in other towns, these were major events, often doubling or tripling (or, multiplying even further) a town's population during the gathering.

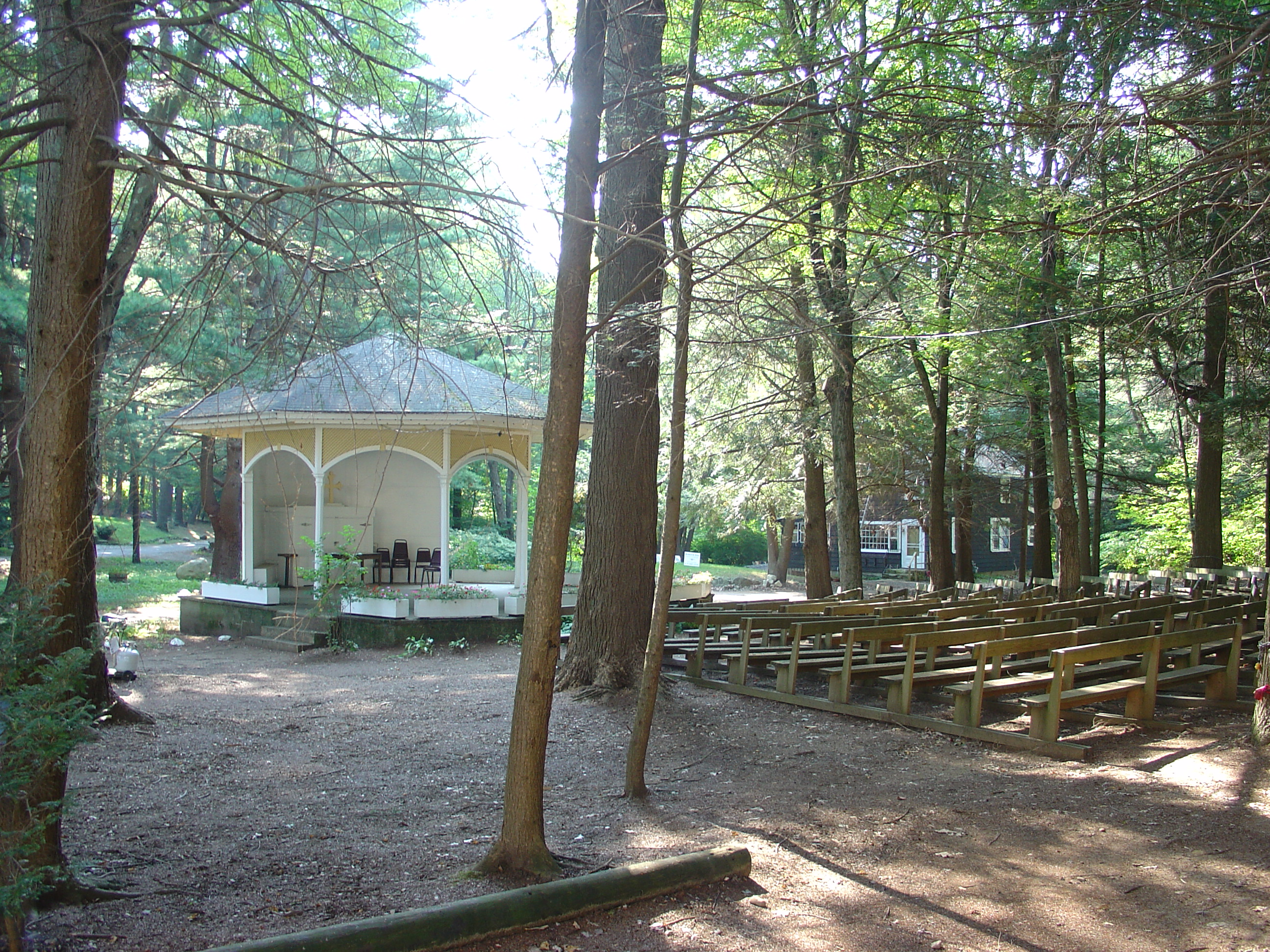
The Circle at Asbury Grove

Reverend Gorham proposed that camp life should be modest, and most early camp meetings reflected this ideology by constructing only cloth tents (participants paid a small fee to rent a tent site) and wooden preaching stands. Gorham also encouraged the use of “society tents” where smaller groups could meet to hold bible study and prayer meetings.

Asbury Grove's main preaching venue became The Circle, which was surrounded by 36 large tents (one for each of the member churches). These large tents had wood walls measuring six feet high, a canvas roof, and the ground inside was often covered in straw.

== Peak years ==
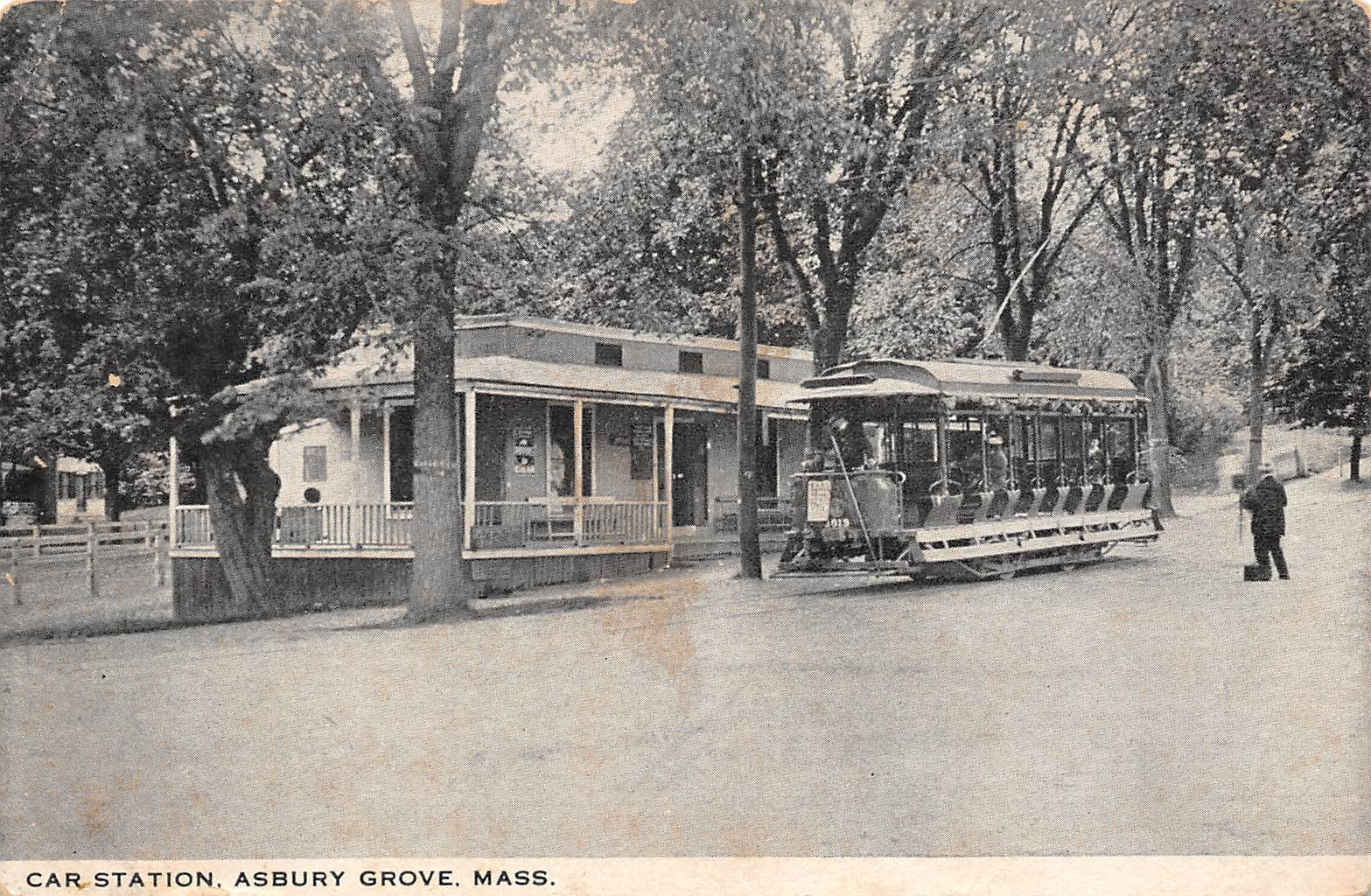
A trolley at the Asbury Grove stop in the early 1900s

The latter part of the 19th century saw the camp meeting movement gain momentum and vitality. The years from 1870 to 1879 marked the largest period of growth for the Asbury Grove camp. During this time, over 200 cottages were built. This was a marked change from the site's early years where the primary accommodations consisted of rough tents or open air campsites. The oldest surviving cottages were built closest to the prayer circle, with newer structures radiating outward from that point. Like other camps of the era, Asbury Grove slowly evolved to include permanent structures such as a dining hall, bakery, post office, and railroad ticket office. By 1875, the society tents were replaced by two story wood structures, five of which remain today.

Camp participants came from a variety of socio-economic backgrounds. A resident directory from the late 19th and early 20th century includes entries for a shoe manufacturer, teamster, oil dealer, carpenter, and a tin ware dealer. This kind of diversity was part of the philosophy that camp meetings were to be retreats from everyday life where participants focused on religious devotion and not worldly goods.

A typical day at Asbury Grove began at 5:30 a.m. followed by breakfast served promptly at 6:30 a.m. Preaching services were scheduled for 10:00 a.m., 3:00 p.m. and 7:00 p.m., interrupted by lunch at noon, and the evening meal at 5:00 p.m. Each society also held a prayer meeting one half-hour after each meal. Curfew was at 10:00 p.m. each night, enforced by a policeman (and later, in the 1940s, by an Asbury Camp Meeting Association member) on patrol to look for people walking about or lights on inside cottages.

Aside from a rigid structure to the day, personal activity was also regulated. No vehicles (wagons, automobiles, etc.) were permitted to enter during preaching services. Smoking was prohibited in the prayer circle at all times, and alcohol was strongly discouraged, even in private cottages and tents.

== Decline ==
By the late 19th century, camp meetings were declining in popularity across the United States. This change had as much to do with society's movement away from the religious fervency of the 18th and 19th centuries as with the ease of travel caused by extensive railroad construction and the introduction of the automobile. A fire in 1927 caused extensive damage to the camp and many of the cottages were marred or destroyed entirely.

A series of other fires and severe weather in the first half of the 20th century also damaged many of the cottages and the camp's property. Thereafter, a portion of the damaged structures were rebuilt, but some were left as empty lots or allowed to fall into disrepair.

The Asbury Camp Meeting Association introduced more social activities in the late 19th and early 20th century. Though Methodist preaching was still a strong influence, programs for children and youths, bible conferences, patriotic rallies, and recreational activities such as baseball and tennis began to be offered.

== Present day ==
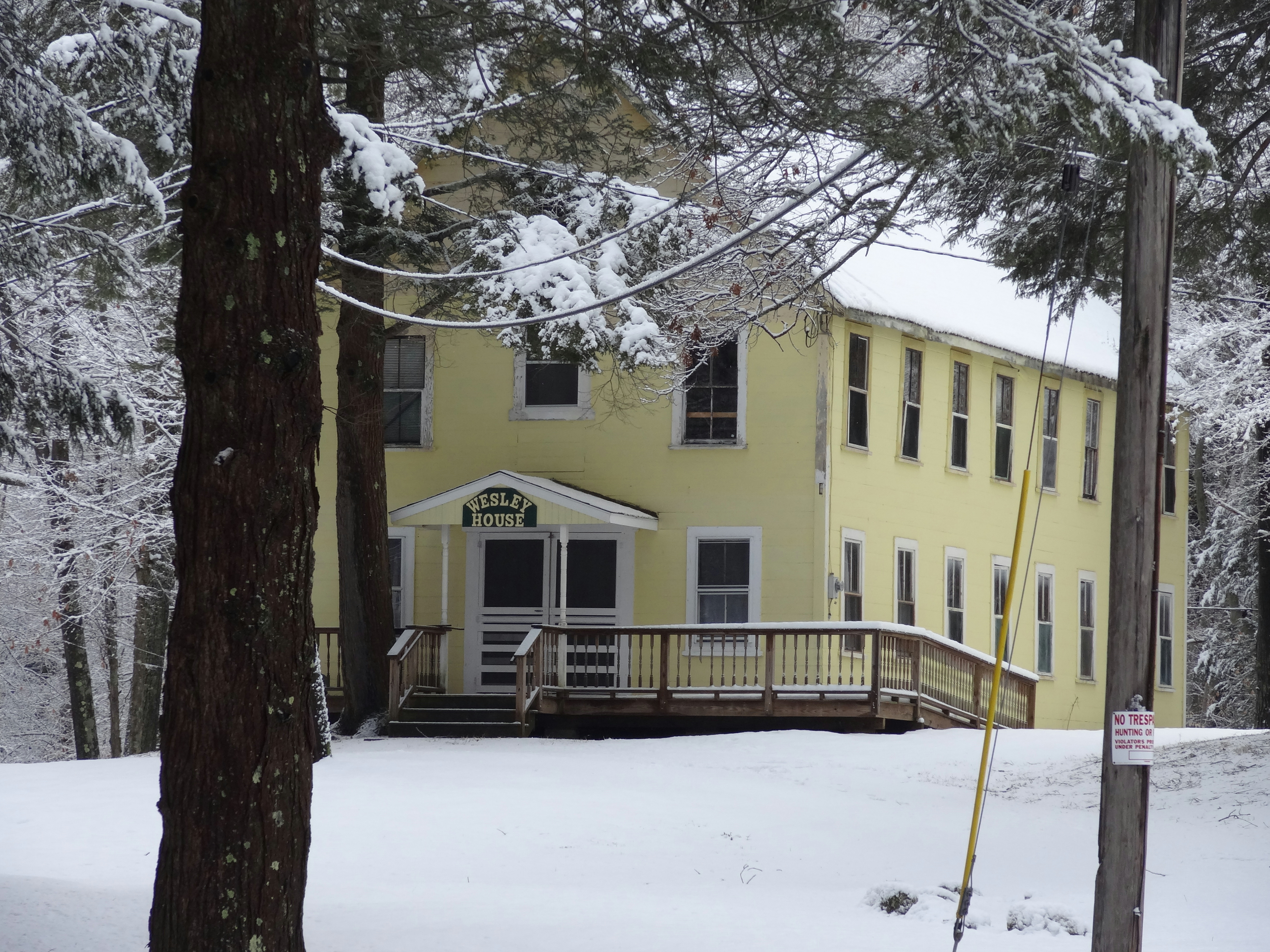
Wesley House, one of the original Asbury Grove dormitories

Still active today, Asbury Grove now covers 83 forested acres, set out in much the same pattern as the initial design. Historians believe this layout was heavily influenced by the Camp Meeting Manual as it adheres to a circular plan which was popular for camp meetings at the time. Although the land is owned by the Methodist church, many of the cottages are held as private residences and 100 of the remaining 153 adhere to their original design. About 30 of the structures are small modern homes or cottages that have been altered enough that they no longer retain their historical characteristics. Overall, the cottages are still used as summer residences, but 60 have been winterized for year-round use.

2009 marked the 150th anniversary of continuous annual camp meetings at Asbury Grove. In preparation, the Asbury Camp Meeting Association renovated many of the common buildings, including the tabernacle, kitchen, and dining hall. The camp has also hosted a number of worship services, social gatherings, cottage tours, theater productions, and sporting events in observance of this occasion.

== See also ==
- National Register of Historic Places listings in Essex County, Massachusetts
