= Ipswich station (MBTA) =

Railway station in Ipswich, Massachusetts

Ipswich
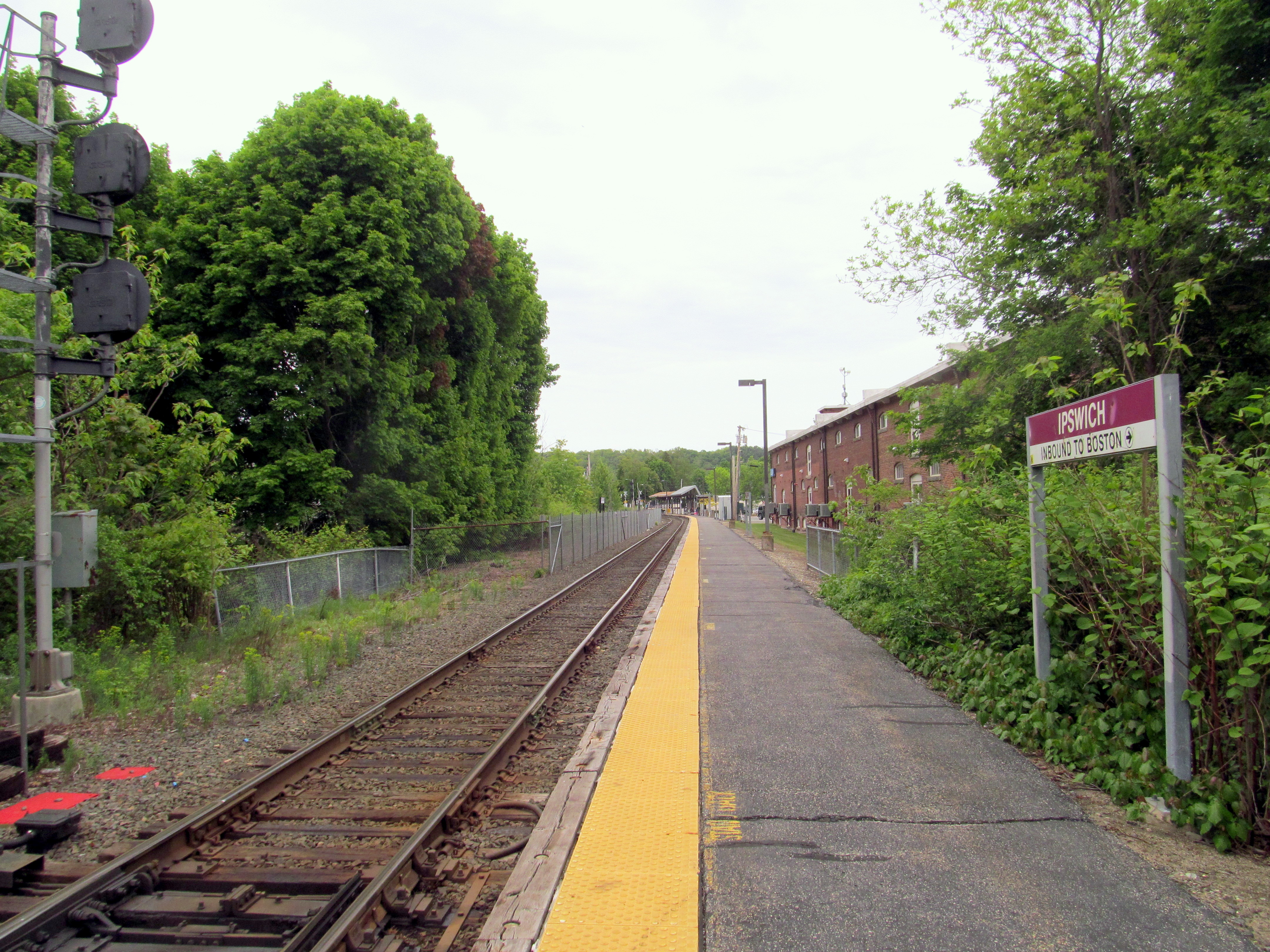
- Ipswich station in 2017

General information
- Location: 4 Topsfield Road; Ipswich, Massachusetts
- Coordinates: 42.67670°N 70.84058°W
- Line: Eastern Route
- Platforms: 1 side platform
- Tracks: 1
- Connections: CATA: 12 (seasonal)

Construction
- Parking: Yes
- Accessible: Yes

Other information
- Fare zone: 6

Passengers
- 2024: 205 daily boardings

Services
Preceding station	MBTA	Following station
Hamilton/Wenham toward North Station	Newburyport/Rockport Line	Rowley toward Newburyport
Location

Ipswich station is an MBTA Commuter Rail station in Ipswich, Massachusetts. Located in downtown Ipswich, it serves the Newburyport/Rockport Line. The station is accessible, with a mini-high platform on the northern end of the platform.

The former Boston and Maine Railroad station building was demolished by 1962. Ipswich was the terminus of the line from April 1976, when the lone remaining round trip to Newburyport station was cut, until full service was restored on October 26, 1998. Just south of the end of the platform are two auxiliary tracks that were used to store trains during that time.
